= Timeline of terrorist attacks in the United States =

Notable terrorist attacks in the U.S.

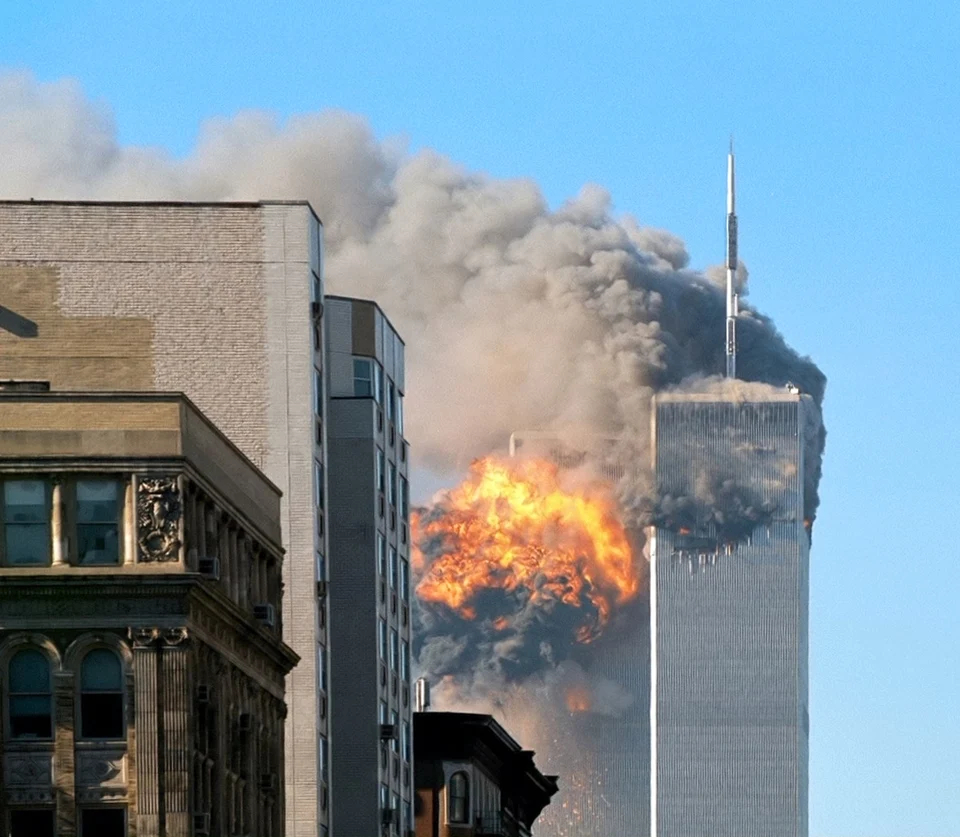
United Airlines Flight 175 crashes into the south tower of the World Trade Center in New York City during the September 11 attacks

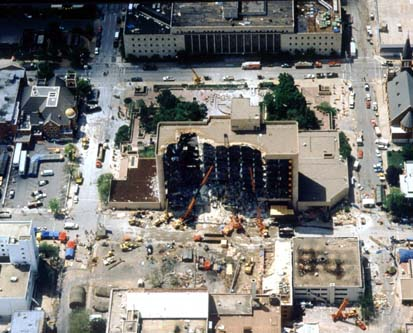
An aerial view, looking from the north, of the destruction of the Alfred P. Murrah Federal Building after the Oklahoma City Bombing

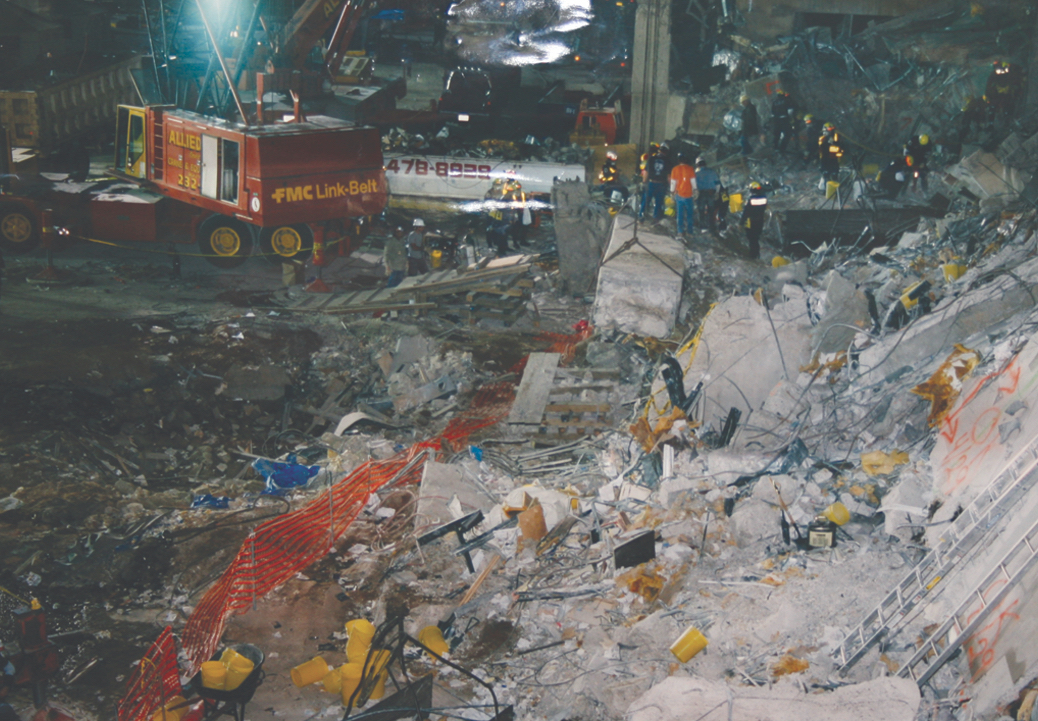
A team of men and a lone figure in an orange vest are assembled near to a cordoned-off area of rubble produced by the 1993 World Trade Center bombing

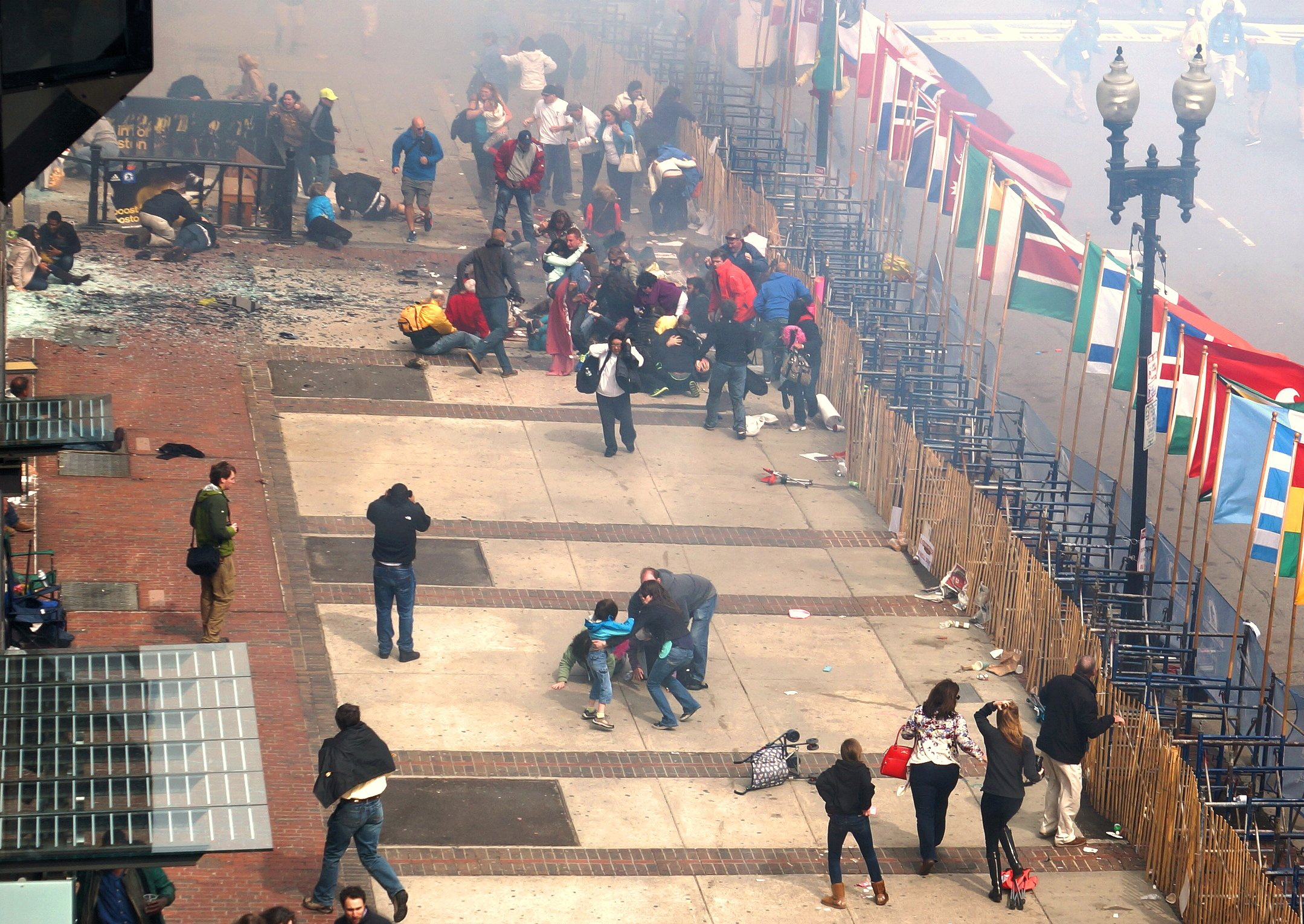
Spectators provide aid to victims following the initial pressure-cooker bomb detonation during the 2013 Boston Marathon bombing, an attack that killed three people and injured over 260 others

The Timeline of terrorism in the United States is a chronological list of terrorist attacks and plots that have occurred in the United States. Terrorism is defined by the Federal Bureau of Investigation as the unlawful use of force or violence against persons or property to intimidate or coerce a government, civilian population, or any segment thereof in furtherance of political or social objectives. This timeline includes incidents committed by both domestic and international actors, covering a wide range of ideologies and motivations.

The deadliest terrorist attack in United States history was the September 11 attacks, in which 2,977 victims were killed when al-Qaeda operatives hijacked four commercial airliners in 2001. Other large-scale attacks include the 1995 Oklahoma City bombing, which killed 168 people; the 1857 Mountain Meadows Massacre, in which 120 - 140 people were killed; and the 2016 Pulse nightclub shooting, which resulted in 49 deaths. These remain the 4 most severe acts of terrorism in the country.

Patterns of terrorism in the United States have shifted significantly over time. Early incidents included anarchist bombings and politically motivated assassinations in the late 19th and early 20th centuries, as well as violence linked to racial conflict, civil rights struggles, Puerto Rican nationalist movements, and opposition to the Vietnam War. Since the late 20th century, major themes include anti-government extremism, jihadist-inspired attacks, and white nationalism.

Between 2010 and 2021, at least 231 terrorist incidents or plots were documented in the United States, resulting in approximately 145 deaths and more than 370 injuries. In 2021 alone, there were 73 recorded plots or attacks, compared with 29 in 2015.

== Attacks by date ==
=== 1750–99 ===
Date	Type	Dead	Injured	Location	Details	Perpetrator
March 8, 1782	Massacre	96	2	Gnadenhutten, Ohio (then part of the Indian reserve / Ohio Country)	Gnadenhutten massacre – Pennsylvania militia round up and execute 96 unarmed pacifist Christian Delaware (Lenape) Indians, including 69 women and children, as revenge for raids against settlers (carried out by other Indians) as well as in expression of general animosity towards all Native Americans. They then plundered and burned their village.	Pennsylvania militia

=== 1800–99 ===
Date	Type	Dead	Injured	Location	Details	Perpetrator
September 3, 1812	Scalping	24	unknown	Pigeon Roost Village, Northwest Territory	Pigeon Roost massacre – Near the onset of the war of 1812, a war party of Shawnee Indians made a surprise attack on Pigeon Roost village, killing 24 settlers.	Shawnee Indians
November 18, 1813	Massacre	64	29	Hillabee, Alabama	Hillabee massacre – A day after the Hillabee Creeks had sued for peace, which was then granted by General Andrew Jackson, General William Cocke attacked and destroyed the Creek villages of Little Oakfusky and Genalga and then the main town of Hillabee. Thinking they were at peace, the Indians were unprepared and gave little resistance.	U.S. troops
April 21, 1818	Pillaging of village	5–10	unknown	(Georgia (U.S. state)) Chehaw Village, Georgia	Chehaw Affair – During the First Seminole War, Captain Obed Wright and a band of volunteer Georgia militiamen, angered by recent attacks from the Phelemmes and the Hoppones, took out their anger on the friendly village of Chehaw, despite the insistence of the local fort commander that the people were peaceful. Wright and his militia burned the village to the ground and claimed to have killed 40–50 warriors without suffering any casualties, though other accounts placed number of Chehaw residents killed at 5–10.	Volunteer militia
February 1823	Massacre and razing of village	19	unknown	Galveston Bay, Mexican Texas	Skull Creek massacre – After Coco Indians killed two colonists under unclear circumstances, the colonists got together twenty-five men and found a Karankawa village on Skull Creek. They killed at least nineteen inhabitants of the village before the rest could flee, then stole their possessions and burned their homes to the ground.	White Colonists
1826	Massacre by rifle	40–50	unknown	Galveston Bay, Mexican Texas	Dressing Point massacre – After a reported attack on two settler families, a band of White settlers went out looking for Indians and found a group of Coco Indians pinned against a river mouth. When the Indians attempted to escape by swimming across the river, the settlers shot them as they swam, killing men, women, and children.	White colonists
November 7, 1837	Lynching, shootout	1 (+1)	Several	Alton, Illinois	Elijah Parish Lovejoy was killed by a pro-slavery mob while defending the site of his anti-slavery newspaper, The Saint Louis Observer.	Pro-slavery mob
May 12, 1846	Massacre by gun	14+	unknown	Klamath County, Oregon	Klamath Lake massacre – Frémont expeditioners led by Kit Carson destroyed a village of Klamath peoples on the shores of Klamath Lake, killing at least 14 Klamath Indians.	White expeditioners and Delaware Indians
June 1846	Massacre by gun	several	unknown	Sutter County, California	Sutter Buttes massacre – American expeditioners attacked a rancheria of Patwin Indians, killing several while the rest fled.	White expeditioners and Delaware Indians
February 28, 1847	Massacre by gun	20	unknown	Sutter County, California	Kern and Sutter massacres – American settlers and U.S. Army personnel make a series of three attacks on local California Indians in an attempt to dissuade them from future raids.	U.S. Army and White settlers
March 1847	Massacre	5 (possibly 1)	"many more"	Sutter County, California	Rancheria Tulea massacre – American slavers attack Rancheria Tulea in retaliation for the escape of Indian slaves.	White slavers
June 1847–July 1847	Slave raid	12–20	unknown	Sutter County, California	Konkow Maidu slaver massacre – Konkow Maidu massacred so that ~30 of their women and children could be carried off into slavery.	White slavers
May 15, 1854	Massacre by gun from horses	40	unknown	Mendocino County, California	Asbill massacre – Six Missouri explorers led by Pierce Asbill, upon learning that the newly discovered Round Valley which they coveted was populated by Indians, proceeded to kill approximately 40 of the Yuki with guns from horseback.	White settlers
May 21, 1856	Sacking	0 (+1)	1	Lawrence, Kansas Territory	Sacking of Lawrence – Pro-Slavery forces enter Lawrence, Kansas to disarm residents and destroy the town's presses and the Free State Hotel.	Pro-slavery militants
May 22, 1856	Assault	0	1	(Washington, D.C.) District of Columbia	Congressman Preston Brooks of South Carolina famously assaulted Charles Sumner for an anti slavery speech and personal insults.	Pro-slavery militants
September 11, 1857	Massacre	~120	~17	Mountain Meadows, Utah Territory	Mountain Meadows massacre – During the Utah War, Mormon militiamen fueled by paranoia attacked the Baker–Fancher party wagon train, killing everyone older than 7. The party's 17 surviving children were kidnapped into Mormon families and the victims' property was auctioned off to the local community. Historical records vary widely regarding the involvement of the local Paiutes.	Utah Territorial Militia and local Paiutes
October 16, 1859	Mass shooting, stabbing	5		Franklin County, Kansas Territory	Pottawatomie massacre – In response to the sacking of Lawrence, John Brown led a group of abolitionists to murder five Kansas settlers from Tennessee, whom he presumed to be pro-slavery.	Pottawatomie Rifles
July 1859–January 1860	Organized genocide	283+ (+5)	unknown	Mendocino County, California	Mendocino War – Anti-Indian band of mercenaries known as the "Eel River Rangers" kill 283 Indians, as well as capturing 292, in 23 separate engagements meant to drive Indians out of Round Valley. Overall casualties may have been in excess of 600.	Eel River Rangers, anti-Indian mercenaries
February 26, 1860–February 28, 1860	Mass shooting, stabbing, hatchets, clubs	80+	unknown	Indian Island (Humboldt Bay), California	1860 Wiyot massacre – Motivated by anger at cattle-stealing and the aim of terrorizing and eliminating all Indians in the region, around 50–100 white settlers coordinated 12 attacks on women, children, and elder men in Wiyot villages in the Humboldt Bay area from February 26–28. The reported number of Indians killed in some of the attacks are 80-150+ (Indian Island), 40 (Eel River), 58 (South Beach), 35 (Eagle Prairie), while the death tolls from several attacks are unknown.	White settlers
August 21, 1863	Massacre/Plunder	164 (+40)	1	Lawrence, Kansas Territory	Lawrence massacre – Pro-Confederate guerrillas destroy Lawrence, Kansas due to its support of abolition and reputation as a holdout for pro-union militias.	Pro-Confederate guerrillas
December 7, 1863	Murder/Piracy	1	3	Off the coast of Cape Cod, Massachusetts	Chesapeake Affair – Pro-Confederate British subjects from the Maritime Provinces hijacked the American steamer Chesapeake off the coast of Cape Cod, Massachusetts, killing a crew member and wounding three others in the ensuing gunfight. The intent of this hijacking was to use the ship as a blockade runner for the Confederacy under belief that they had an official Confederate letter of marque. The perpetrators had planned to re-coal at Saint John, New Brunswick, and head south to Wilmington, North Carolina. Instead, the captors had difficulties at Saint John; so they sailed further east and re-coaled in Halifax, Nova Scotia. U.S. forces responded to the attack by trying to arrest the captors in Nova Scotian waters. All of the Chesapeake hijackers were able to escape extradition through the assistance of William Johnston Almon, a prominent Nova Scotian and Confederate sympathizer.	Pro-Confederate British subjects
October 19, 1864	Robbery/Murder/Hostage-taking/Attempted arson	1	2	St. Albans, Vermont	On October 19, 1864, non-properly uniformed Confederate soldiers led by Bennett H. Young raided the border town of St. Albans, Vermont from Canada, robbing $208,000 from three banks, holding hostages, killing a civilian, attempting to burn the entire town with Greek fire, then escaping back to Canada; the raiders were then arrested by British authorities under an extradition request from the U.S. government, but were later freed by a Canadian court on the grounds that they were considered combatants rather than criminals.	Bennett H. Young and his co-conspirators
April 14, 1865	Assassination, shooting, stabbing	1	4	District of Columbia	Abraham Lincoln assassination – Part of a conspiracy by Confederate supporters John Wilkes Booth, Lewis Powell and George Atzerodt to assassinate President Abraham Lincoln, Vice President Andrew Johnson and Secretary of State William Seward in Washington, D.C. to create chaos for the purpose of overthrowing the Federal Government. Booth succeeded in assassinating Lincoln at Ford's Theatre, Seward suffered numerous stab wounds by Powell who stabbed others as he was chased out of Seward's home, and Atzerodt failed to carry out the planned murder of Johnson. Booth was killed by soldiers when he failed to surrender. Eight conspirators were tried and convicted for their role in the conspiracy by a military tribunal, including Powell and Atzerodt. Four defendants were executed for their roles including Powell, Azterodt and Mary Surratt, whom many historians conclude was probably innocent. Surratt was the first woman ever to be executed by the U.S. government.	John Wilkes Booth, Lewis Powell, George Atzerodt and co-conspirators
March 1871	Mob violence	~30	unknown	Meridian, Mississippi	Meridian Race Riot of 1871 – A highly contentious trial regarding the persecution of Black freedmen by the Ku Klux Klan and subsequent retaliation by the freedmen led to a gunfight in the courtroom and the death of the presiding judge. The local Klansmen looked for the Black suspects they thought responsible, and when unable to find them began killing all freedmen of note in the town, some on the streets and others while in custody. At least one home and a church that was being used as a school were also burned down. Approximately thirty Black men were killed over three days before federal troops arrived to stop the killings.	Ku Klux Klan and White locals
April 13, 1873	Mass shooting, prisoner massacre	105+ (+3)	unknown	Colfax, Louisiana	Colfax massacre – Black freedmen defending a courthouse were massacred by 300 armed White Southern Democrats and Ku Klux Klan members who wanted to take political control of the town in what they referred to as a "struggle for White supremacy". Casualty reports varied from 62 to 153, with a military report at the time stating 81 Black men by name who had been killed with several dozen more secretly buried or disposed of in the river, along with three White men, for a total of "at least" 105 casualties.	Southern Democrats, Ku Klux Klan and White locals
July 2, 1881	Assassination, shooting	1	0	District of Columbia	Assassination of James A. Garfield – United States President James A. Garfield was shot by a disgruntled office seeker named Charles J. Guiteau. He was turned down by Garfield for the French Ambassadorship. Angry at this rejection, he shot Garfield. Garfield died on September 19, 1881, of blood poisoning caused by unclean medical treatment. Guiteau was tried, convicted and hanged.	Charles J. Guiteau
May 4, 1886	Bombing, shooting, riot	11+	130+	Chicago, Illinois	Haymarket affair – An unknown person or persons at Haymarket Square in Chicago detonated a bomb during a labor rally, killing a police officer and prompting the police to open fire. In the mayhem, an undetermined number of civilians and seven more police officers were killed, mostly by the police shooting in response. Eight anarchists were convicted of conspiracy, and four of them hanged the next year. One killed himself, and the remaining three were later pardoned.	Federation of Organized Trades and Labor Unions; Chicago Police Department
October 28, 1893	Assassination	1	0	Chicago, Illinois	Assassination of Carter Harrison III– Patrick Eugene Joseph Prendergast was upset that the Mayor of Chicago, Carter Harrison, Sr., advocated for the repeal of the Sherman Silver Purchase Act of 1890, seeing it as an action against the citizenry and acting under the influence of England, the Rothschild bankers of Europe, and Wall St. Prendergast imagined this as part of a larger conspiracy that betrayed the will of Jesus Christ. As a delusional newspaper man, he found himself unable to influence policy in Washington or Chicago and ultimately took it upon himself to change the course of history by assassinating the powerful mayor. He felt that his inevitable acquittal would establish a precedent wherein Christian law would be established throughout the city. Prendergast was convicted, held to be sane by a jury (allowing for him to be executed), and ultimately hanged on July 14, 1894.	Patrick Eugene Prendergast

=== 1900–59 ===
Date	Type	Dead	Injured	Location(s)	Details	Perpetrator
September 6, 1901	Assassination, shooting	1	0	(New York (state)) Buffalo, New York	Assassination of William McKinley – President William McKinley is assassinated by Michigan-born anarchist Leon Czolgosz, in Buffalo, New York.	Leon Czolgosz
December 30, 1905	Assassination, bombing	1	0	Caldwell, Idaho	Former Idaho governor Frank Steunenberg is killed by a bomb in front of his Caldwell, Idaho home. The assassin, Harry Orchard, turned state's evidence and accused the Western Federation of Miners of having hired him to assassinate Steunenberg in retaliation for breaking up miners' strikes. However, the labor leaders put on trial due to his accusations were acquitted as defense attorneys Clarence Darrow and Edmund F. Richardson successfully discredited Orchard's testimony.	Harry Orchard
October 1, 1910	Bombing	21	100+	Los Angeles, California	Los Angeles Times bombing – The Los Angeles Times building in Los Angeles was destroyed by dynamite, killing 21 workers. The bomb was apparently placed due to the paper's opposition to unionization in the city; two labor organizers, the McNamara brothers, then pled guilty to escape a death sentence, receiving fifteen years and life in prison respectively.	James and John McNamara
May 30, 1915	Bombing	0	0	(Washington (state)) Harbor Island, Seattle, Washington	German agents blew up a barge carrying 15 tons of refined gunpowder just off of Harbor Island, Seattle, Washington.	Imperial German agents
July 2, 1915–July 3, 1915	Bombing, shooting	0	1	District of Columbia/ (New York (state)) Glen Cove, New York	Frank Holt (also known as Eric Muenter), a German professor who wanted to stop American support of the Allies in World War I, exploded a bomb in the reception room of the U.S. Senate. The next morning he tried to assassinate J. P. Morgan, Jr., the son of the financier whose company served as Britain's principal purchasing agent for munitions and other war supplies in the United States. Muenter was overpowered by Morgan in Morgan's Long Island home before killing himself in prison on July 7.	Eric Muenter
July 22, 1916	Bombing	10	40	San Francisco, California	Preparedness Day Bombing – Ten people killed and 40 injured by an explosion during a Preparedness Day parade in San Francisco. Two radical labor leaders, Warren K. Billings and Thomas Mooney, were convicted of the crime and sentenced to hang, but with little evidence of their guilt both sentences were commuted to life imprisonment. They were both eventually pardoned, and the actual bombers' identities remain unknown.	Galleanist anarchists (suspected)
July 30, 1916	Bombing, sabotage	7	Hundreds	Jersey City, New Jersey	Black Tom explosion – in Jersey City, New Jersey was an act of sabotage on American ammunition supplies by German agents to prevent the materiel from being used by the Allies in World War I.	Imperial German agents
October 21, 1916	Lynching	1	1	Abbeville County, South Carolina	Anthony Crawford, a prominent black landowner and businessman, was attacked, arrested for his own protection, abducted from jail, hung and shot. He managed to hit one of his attackers (McKinny Cann) in the head with a hammer.	White mob
November 24, 1917	Bombing	10	2	Milwaukee, Wisconsin	A bomb exploded in a Milwaukee police station, killing nine officers and a civilian. Anarchists were suspected.	Galleanist anarchists (suspected)
1919	Bombings	1	Several	(United States) Across the country	1919 United States anarchist bombings: A series of package bombs were mailed to prominent business and government leaders around the country. Most were intercepted and did not go off, with only one person killed (a bomber whose bomb went off accidentally). Italian Galleanist anarchists were suspected, but not convicted.	Galleanist anarchists (suspected)
1919	Race riots	Hundreds	Hundreds	(United States) Across the country	Red Summer: period from late winter through early autumn of 1919 during which white supremacist terrorism and racial riots took place across the United States. In most instances, attacks consisted of white-on-black violence. However, numerous African Americans also fought back, notably in the Chicago and Washington, D.C. race riots Still, the highest number of fatalities occurred in the rural area around Elaine, Arkansas, where an estimated 100–240 black people and five white people were killed—an event now known as the Elaine massacre.	White mobs
September 16, 1920	Bombing	38	143	(New York (state)) New York City, New York	Wall Street bombing: A horse-drawn wagon filled with explosives was detonated in front of the J. P. Morgan bank on Wall Street, killing 38 and wounding 143. Galleanist anarchists were again suspected, but the perpetrators were never caught.	Galleanist anarchists (suspected)
June 1, 1921	Mob violence	75–300	800+	Tulsa, Oklahoma	Tulsa race massacre: White mobs of approximately 500–1000 people, instigated by the rumor of an assault of a white woman and subsequent minor riot, armed themselves and attacked a black neighborhood in Tulsa known as the Black Wall Street. The riot killed 75–300 people and destroyed more than 1,100 homes and hundreds of businesses, leaving over 9,000 people homeless. Airplanes were reported to have dropped incendiary devices on the city, contributing to a firestorm.	White mobs
May 18, 1927	Bombing	44 (+1)	58	Bath Township, Michigan	Bath School disaster: 55-year-old school board treasurer Andrew Kehoe, angered by his property taxes being raised and having been defeated in a campaign for township clerk, detonated a cache of dynamite he placed in the Bath Consolidated School as revenge, destroying the north wing. In the explosion 36 school children and two teachers were killed. As rescuers arrived to help, Kehoe drove up in his truck and detonated another cache of dynamite stored there, which killed himself, the school superintendent, and several others, while injuring bystanders as well. Afterward, 500 more pounds of dynamite with a timing device were found in the south wing which Kehoe apparently set to go off at the same time but failed, and would have succeeded in destroying the entire school. Prior to the bombings, Kehoe murdered his wife and also destroyed his farm buildings with dynamite. The worst mass murder at a school in US history, it may also be the first suicide truck bombing. A sign Kehoe placed on his property was found afterward reading "Criminals are made, not born".	Andrew Kehoe
July 4, 1940	Bombing	2	2	(New York (state)) New York City, New York	Two New York City policemen were killed and two critically wounded while examining a bomb they had found at the British Pavilion at the World's Fair.	Unknown
1940–1956	Bombing	0	10	(New York (state)) New York City, New York	George Metesky, the "Mad Bomber", placed over 30 bombs in New York City in public places such as Grand Central Station and the Paramount Theatre, injuring 10, in protest of the high rates of a local electric utility. He also sent many threatening letters to various high-profile individuals.	George Metesky
February 12, 1941	Lynching	1	0	Fort Benning Military Base, Georgia	Private Felix Hall was strangled to death on base after an argument with his white boss and walking through a white neighborhood. His murder by a number of assailants was poorly investigated by the army, which kept insisting that he strangled himself despite the evidence.	White supremacists
1951	Bombings, shootings, melee attacks	Several	Several	Florida	A wave of hate-related terrorist attacks occurred in Florida. African-Americans were dragged and beaten to death, with 11 race-related bombings, the dynamiting of synagogues, and a Jewish School in Miami and explosives found outside of Catholic Churches in Miami.	
March 1, 1954	Shooting	0	5	Washington, D.C.	Capitol Hill shooting incident – An attack carried out by Puerto Rican nationalists, they shot 30 rounds from semi-automatic pistols from the Ladies' Gallery (a balcony for visitors) of the House of Representatives chamber in the United States Capitol.	Lolita Lebrón, Rafael Cancel Miranda, Andrés Figueroa Cordero, Irvin Flores Rodríguez
1957	Bombing	0	0	Nashville, Tennessee	Before school day started on September 10, the day after the first African American student started attending Hattie Cotton Elementary School a bomb exploded, destroying part of the building and causing $71,000 damage.	White supremacists
October 12, 1958	Bombings	0	0	(Georgia (U.S. state)) Atlanta, Georgia	Bombing of the Hebrew Benevolent Congregation Temple of Atlanta, Georgia. The acts were carried out by white supremacists.	National States' Rights Party (suspected)

=== 1960s ===
Date	Type	Dead	Injured	Location	Details	Perpetrator
March 25, 1960	Attempted arson, Shooting	0	2	Gadsden, Alabama	A 16-year old Nazi threw a firebomb at a synagogue but when it failed to penetrate the window he dropped his second one and started to flee towards his car. Then he started shooting at congregants who came out of the building injuring two, including one critically. He later died in a car accident on 31 August the same year while out on bond.	Hubert Jackson, Jr., alias Jerry Hunt
September 15, 1963	Bombings	4	22	Birmingham, Alabama	16th Street Baptist Church bombing: Members of the Ku Klux Klan and segregationists plant bombs inside the African-American 16th Street Baptist Church in Birmingham, killing four young African American girls and injuring 22 more.	Ku Klux Klan and segregationists
November 22, 1963	Assassination, shooting	2	2	Dallas, Texas	Assassination of John F. Kennedy: U.S. president John Fitzgerald Kennedy is killed by communist Lee Harvey Oswald in Dealey Plaza in Dallas. Oswald kills Dallas police officer J.D. Tippit while fleeing.	Lee Harvey Oswald
June 16, 1964	Burning	0	0	Neshoba County, Mississippi	Mt. Zion Baptist Church is burned as part of a campaign to stop integration and the Civil Rights Movement.	Ku Klux Klan
June 21, 1964	Murder	3	0	Philadelphia, Mississippi	Michael (Mickey) Schwerner, James Chaney, and Andrew Goodman were detained by Mississippi police then abducted and murdered for their work with Congress of Racial Equality (CORE).	Ku Klux Klan
April 1968	Hostage-taking	0	0	Hartford, Connecticut	Students at Trinity College held the board of trustees captive until their demands were met.	Trinity College students
April 4, 1968	Assassination, shooting	1	0	Memphis, Tennessee	Martin Luther King Jr. is assassinated.	James Earl Ray
April 23, 1968–April 30, 1968	Hostage-taking	0	0	(New York (state)) New York City, New York	During a student rebellion at New York's Columbia University, members of the New Left organization Students for a Democratic Society and the Student Afro-American Society held a dean hostage, demanding an end to both military research on campus and an end to construction of a gymnasium in nearby Harlem.	Students for a Democratic Society; Student Afro-American Society
June 5, 1968	Assassination, shooting	1	5	Los Angeles, California	Assassination of Robert F. Kennedy: Senator Robert F. Kennedy, while campaigning for U.S. presidency during the 1968 United States Presidential election, is shot to death by Palestinian-Jordanian Sirhan Sirhan in the kitchen of the Ambassador Hotel in Los Angeles, California. Sirhan was angered over Kennedy's support for Israel.	Sirhan Sirhan
November 1968	Hostage taking	0	0	Los Angeles, California	Officials of San Fernando State College are held at knifepoint by students.	San Fernando State College students
January 1, 1969–April 15, 1970	Widespread violence	Unknown	Unknown	United States	8,200 Bombings, attempted bombings and bomb threats attributed to "campus disturbances and student unrest"	University students across America, many members of Students for a Democratic Society
February 1969	Bombing	0	1	Claremont, California	A secretary at Pomona College was severely injured by bomb.	Left-wing student radicals
March 1969	Bombing	0	0 (+1)	San Francisco, California	A student was critically injured while attempting to bomb a San Francisco State College classroom.	Left-wing student radical
August 20, 1969	Bombing	0	20	(New York (state)) New York City, New York	Twenty were injured by radical leftist Sam Melville in a bombing of the Marine Midland Building in New York City.	Sam Melville
September 18, 1969	Bombing	0	0	(New York (state)) New York City, New York	The Federal Building in New York City is bombed by radical leftist Jane Alpert.	Jane Alpert
October 7, 1969	Bombing	0	0	(New York (state)) New York City, New York	Fifth floor of the Armed Forces Induction Center in New York City was devastated by explosion attributed to radical leftist Jane Alpert.	Jane Alpert
November 12, 1969	Bombing	0	0	(New York (state)) New York City, New York	A bomb is detonated in the Manhattan Criminal Court building in New York City. Jane Alpert, Sam Melville, and 3 other militant radical leftists are arrested hours later.	Jane Alpert, Sam Melville and others

=== 1970s ===
Date	Type	Dead	Injured	Location(s)	Details	Perpetrator
1970s	Bombing	5	69+	(New York (state)) New York City/ Chicago, Illinois	The most active perpetrators of terrorism in New York City were Fuerzas Armadas de Liberación Nacional (FALN), a Puerto Rican separatist group, responsible for 40 NYC attacks in this decade. The Jewish Defense League (JDL), which engaged in attacks against targets it perceived to be anti-Semitic, launched 27 attacks during this period, none deadly. Both the Independent Armed Revolutionary Commandos (CRIA), another Puerto Rican separatist group, and Omega 7, an anti-Castro Cuban organization, were also each responsible for 16 attacks during this period.	Fuerzas Armadas de Liberación Nacional
April 1970	Riot	0	Unknown	Stanford, California	At Stanford University, over a period of several nights, bands of student radicals systematically set fires, broke windows and threw rocks.	Left-wing student radicals
May 1970	Firebombing	0	0	Fresno, California	In reaction to the U.S. invasion of Cambodia, Kent State shootings, and Jackson State killings, a Fresno State College computer center is destroyed by a firebomb. While reaction to these three events was massive, most were peaceful.	Left-wing student radicals
August 24, 1970	Bombing	1	3	Madison, Wisconsin	Sterling Hall bombing: Sterling Hall at the University of Wisconsin–Madison is bombed in protest of the Army Mathematics Research Center and the Vietnam War, killing one. Bombers Karleton Armstrong, Dwight Armstrong, David Fine, and Leo Burt claimed the death of physicist Robert Fassnacht was unintentional but acknowledged that they knew the building was occupied when they planted the bomb.	Karleton Armstrong, Dwight Armstrong, David Fine, and Leo Burt
November 21, 1970	Bombing	0	1	Portland, Oregon	Bombing of the City Hall of Portland, Oregon in an attempt to destroy the state's bronze Liberty Bell replica. The late night explosion destroyed the display foyer, blew out the building doors, damaged the council hall, and blew out windows more than a block away. The night janitor was injured in the blast. The crime remains unsolved, though a number of local anti-war and radical leftist groups of the era remain the primary suspects.	Left-wing extremists (suspected)
November 25, 1970	Bombing	0	0	(New York (state)) New York City, New York	The Jewish Defense League was linked to a bomb explosion outside of Aeroflot's New York City office in protest of the treatment of Soviet Jews.	Jewish Defense League
1971	Bombing	0	0	(New York (state)) New York City, New York	The Jewish Defense League was linked to a detonation outside of Soviet cultural offices in Washington, D.C. and rifle fire into the Soviet mission to the United Nations.	Jewish Defense League
March 1, 1971	Bombing	0	0	Washington, D.C.	The radical leftist group Weatherman exploded a bomb in the United States Capitol to protest the U.S. invasion of Laos.	Weatherman
January 27, 1972	Firebombing	1	13	(New York (state)) New York City, New York	The offices of Sol Hurok and Columbia Artists Management, who brought numerous Soviet performers to the United States, were firebombed, killing a secretary and injuring 13 others through smoke inhalation, including Hurok himself. Two members of the Jewish Defense League were charged but the charges were later dismissed.	Jewish Defense League (suspected)
June 1, 1973	Shooting	1	0	Chevy Chase, Maryland	Yosef Alon, the Israeli Air Force attaché in Washington, D.C., was shot and killed outside his home in Chevy Chase, Maryland. The Palestinian militant group Black September was suspected, though the case remains unsolved.	Black September (suspected)
June 24, 1973	Arson	32	15	New Orleans, Louisiana	The UpStairs Lounge arson attack occurred on June 24, 1973, at a gay bar called the UpStairs (or Up Stairs) Lounge located on the second floor of the three-story building at 141 Chartres Street in the French Quarter of New Orleans, Louisiana, in the United States. Thirty-two people died as a result of fire or smoke inhalation. The official cause is still listed as "undetermined origin". The most likely suspect, a man named Roger Nunez who had been ejected from the bar earlier in the day, was never charged and took his own life in November 1974. No evidence has ever been found that the arson was motivated by hatred or overt homophobia.	Roger Dale Nunez (suspected; never charged)
June 13, 1974	Bombing	0	0	Pittsburgh, Pennsylvania	The 29th floor of the Gulf Tower in Pittsburgh, Pennsylvania, was bombed with dynamite at 9:41 pm resulting in no injuries. The radical leftist group Weatherman took credit, but no suspects have ever been identified.	Weatherman
August 6, 1974	Bombings	3	36	Los Angeles, California	"Alphabet Bomber" Muharem Kurbegovic bombed the Pan Am Terminal at Los Angeles International Airport, killing three and injuring 36. He also firebombed the houses of a judge and two police commissioners as well as one of the commissioner's cars. He burned down two Marina Del Rey apartment buildings and threatened Los Angeles with a gas attack. His bomb defused at the Greyhound Bus station was the most powerful the LAPD bomb squad had handled up until that time. His personal vendetta against a judge and the commissioners grew into demands for an end to immigration and naturalization laws, as well as any laws about sex.	Muharem Kurbegovic
January 24, 1975	Bombing	4	50+	(New York (state)) New York City, New York	A bomb exploded in the Fraunces Tavern of New York City, killing four people and injuring more than 50 others. The Puerto Rico nationalist group FALN, the Armed Forces of Puerto Rican National Liberation, which had other bomb incidents in New York in the 1970s, claimed responsibility. No one was ever prosecuted for the bombing.	FALN
December 29, 1975	Bombing	11	76	(New York (state)) New York City, New York	LaGuardia Airport Bombing: killed 11 and injured 75. The bombing remains unsolved.	Unknown
September 11, 1976	Aircraft hijacking, bombing	1	3	(United States) Airspace	Croatian terrorists hijacked a TWA airliner and diverted it to Gander, Newfoundland and Labrador, and then Paris, demanding a manifesto be printed. One police officer was killed and three injured during an attempt to defuse a bomb that contained their communiques in a New York City train station locker. Zvonko Bušić who served 32 years in prison for the attack, was released and returned to Croatia in July 2008. In September 2013 Bušić shot himself and was given a hero's funeral by the Croatian government.	Zvonko Bušić and co-conspirators
September 21, 1976	Assassination, bombing	2	1	Washington, D.C.	Orlando Letelier, a former member of the Chilean government, is killed by a car bomb in Washington, D.C. along with his assistant Ronni Moffitt. The killing was carried out by members of the Chilean Intelligence Agency, DINA.	DINA
March 9, 1977–March 11, 1977	Hijacking	2	3	Washington, D.C.	1977 Washington, D.C. attack and hostage taking: Hanafi Muslim gunmen seize three buildings in Washington, DC and hold hostages for three days, in revenge for the 1973 Hanafi Muslim massacre carried out by a Nation of Islam faction.	Hamaas Abdul Khaalis and allies

=== 1980s ===
Date	Type	Dead	Injured	Location	Details	Perpetrator
June 3, 1980	Bombing	0	0	(New York (state)) New York City, New York	Bombing of the Statue of Liberty: At 7:30 pm, a time delayed explosive device detonates in the Statue of Liberty's Story Room. Detonated after business hours, the bomb did not injure anyone, but caused $18,000 in damage, destroying many of the exhibits. The room was sealed off and left unrepaired until the Statue of Liberty restoration project that began years later. FBI investigators believed the perpetrators were Croatians seeking media coverage of the living conditions of Croats in Yugoslavia, though no arrests were made.	Croatian nationalists (suspected)
July 22, 1980	Shooting	1	0	Bethesda, Maryland	Ali Akbar Tabatabai, an Iranian exile and critic of Ayatollah Khomeni, is shot in his Bethesda, Maryland home. Dawud Salahuddin, an American Muslim convert, was apparently paid by Iranians to kill Tabatabai.	Dawud Salahuddin; Iran
March 21, 1981	Lynching, Cross burning	1	0	Mobile, Alabama	In response to a black man not being found guilty of murdering a white man, three members of the KKK burned a cross on the courthouse lawn. They then picked a black person at random, Michael Donald, who they abducted, beat, strangled and killed; they left his body hanging from a tree. It is one of the few times white perpetrators have been tried and found guilty of a lynching. It is sometimes called the "Last Lynching in America", although it was not the last random racial murder by a white supremacist in the United States, and despite the fact that Michael Donald was not abducted from a jail or courthouse, as was the case with historical lynchings.	Ku Klux Klan
December 7, 1981	Kidnapping attempt	0	0	Washington, D.C.	James W. von Brunn, who would go on to commit the United States Holocaust Memorial Museum shooting in Washington, D.C. in 2009, served 6 years in prison for attempting to kidnap members of the Federal Reserve at their headquarters in 1981. He testified his motive was to raise awareness of alleged "treacherous and unconstitutional" acts by the Federal Reserve.	James W. von Brunn
January 28, 1982	Assassination, shooting	1	0	Los Angeles, California	Kemal Arıkan, the Turkish Consul-General in Los Angeles, was killed by members of the Justice Commandos Against Armenian Genocide.	Justice Commandos Against Armenian Genocide
May 4, 1982	Assassination, shooting	1	0	Somerville, Massachusetts	Assassination of Orhan Gündüz: Turkish Honorary Consul Orhan Gündüz is assassinated in his car in Somerville, Massachusetts by the Justice Commandos Against Armenian Genocide.	Justice Commandos Against Armenian Genocide
November 7, 1983	Bombing	0	0	Washington, D.C.	U.S. Senate bombing: The Armed Resistance Unit, a militant leftist group, bombed the United States Capitol in response to the U.S. invasion of Grenada.	May 19th Communist Organization
June 18, 1984	Assassination, shooting	1	0	Denver, Colorado	Alan Berg, Jewish-American lawyer and talk show host, is shot and killed in the driveway of his home on Capitol Hill, Denver, Colorado, by members of a neo-Nazi and white separatist group called The Order led by terrorist David Lane (the creator of the slogan "Fourteen Words"). Berg had stridently argued with a member of the group on the show earlier who was convicted in his murder.	The Order
August 1984–October 1984	Food poisoning	0	751	The Dalles, Oregon	1984 Rajneeshee bioterror attack: In what is believed to be the first incident of bioterrorism in the United States, the Rajneesh movement spreads salmonella in salad bars at 10 restaurants in The Dalles, Oregon, to influence a local election. The plan backfired, as suspicious residents came out in droves to prevent the election of Rajneeshee candidates. Health officials say that 751 people were sickened and more than 40 hospitalized. All but one of the establishments attacked went out of business. Investigators believed that similar attacks had previously been carried out in Salem, Portland and other cities in Oregon.	Rajneesh movement
October 11, 1985	Assassination, bombing	1	0	Santa Ana, California	Alex Odeh, a prominent Arab-American, was killed by a bomb in his office in Santa Ana, California. The case is unsolved, but it is thought the Jewish Defense League was responsible.	Jewish Defense League (suspected)
December 11, 1985	Bombing	1	0	Sacramento, California	Computer rental store owner, Hugh Scrutton, was the first fatality of the Unabomber's neo-luddite campaign.	Ted Kaczynski (Unabomber)
March 1, 1989	Firebombing	0	0	(New York (state)) New York City, New York	1989 firebombing of the Riverdale Press: The Riverdale Press, a weekly newspaper in the Bronx, New York, was firebombed one week after publishing an editorial defending author Salman Rushdie's right to publish The Satanic Verses, which questioned the founding story of Islam.	Unknown

=== 1990s ===
Date	Type	Dead	Injured	Location	Details	Perpetrator
November 5, 1990	Assassination, shooting	1	0	(New York (state)) New York City, New York	Assassination of Meir Kahane: El Sayyid Nosair, a member of an Islamist terror cell led by Sheik Omar Abdul-Rahman, disguises himself as an Orthodox Jew in order to assassinate politician and Rabbi Meir Kahane leader of the anti-Arab and anti-Islamic Kahanism movement and its political party in Israel Kach and Kahane Chai by shooting Kahane at point-blank range. Nosair is acquitted of Kahane's murder, but convicted of other crimes. In prison, Nosair admits to Kahane's murder.	El Sayyid Nosair
May 6, 1991	Firebombing	0	0	Mobile, Alabama	On May 6, 1991, the Bay City Women’s Medical Center in Mobile, Alabama, was targeted in an attack by anti-abortion extremists. The attack caused minor property damage, estimated to be less than $1 million,	Anti-abortion extremists
June 10, 1991	Firebombing	0	0	Corvallis, Oregon	Rod Coronado, and the Animal Liberation Front, raid Oregon State University and set timed incendiary devices in building, with $62,000 in damage done to an experimental mink farm.	Animal Liberation Front
December 15, 1991	Firebombing	0	0	Yamhill, Oregon	A mink pelt drying company, Hynek Malecky facility, is set fire by the Animal Liberation Front, with costs estimated at $96,000.	Animal Liberation Front
November 8, 1992	Firebombing	0	0	Minneapolis, Minnesota	Animal Rights extremists firebombed five trucks belonging to Swanson Meats Inc., causing significant damage. Each truck sustained direct damages estimated at over $100,000. The FBI classified this incident as an act of domestic terrorism under the Animal Enterprise Protection Act.	Animal Rights extremists
January 25, 1993	Shooting	2	3	Langley, Virginia	CIA Shooting: Pakistani Mir Qazi (a/k/a Mir Aimal Kansi), outraged by U.S. policy toward Palestinians, opens fire on cars stopped at a traffic signal outside CIA Headquarters in Langley, Virginia. He kills 2 and injures 3, then escapes to Pakistan. He is subsequently apprehended, confesses, is tried and executed.	Mir Qazi
February 26, 1993	Truck bombing	6	1042	(New York (state)) New York City, New York	World Trade Center bombing: Ramzi Yousef, a member of Al Qaeda, masterminds the truck-bombing of the World Trade Center. The bomb was meant to destabilize the foundation of the building, causing it to collapse and destroy surrounding buildings, leading to mass casualties. It failed to do so, but the detonation killed six people and injured more than 1,000.	Al Qaeda
March 10, 1993	Shooting	1	0	Pensacola, Florida	Murder of David Gunn: Army of God member Michael F. Griffin ambushes and shoots gynecologist David Gunn three times in the back outside the Pensacola Women's Medical Services clinic. Before murdering Gunn, Griffin shouts, "Don't kill any more babies!"	Michael F. Griffin
August 6, 1993	Mass shooting	4	7 (+1)	Fayetteville, North Carolina	Luigi's Restaurant shooting: A 22-year old Fort Bragg soldier mad about President Bill Clinton's removal of the law forbidding homosexuals in the army along with the approval of women and Blacks to serve, opened fire in a restaurant killing four and injuring 7 before being shot and wounded by police. During the shooting he was yelling about homosexuals in the military and Clinton.	Kenneth Junior French
March 1, 1994	Shooting	1	3	(New York (state)) New York City, New York	Brooklyn Bridge Shooting: Lebanese-born Rashid Baz ambushes and shoots up a van full of Jewish students returning from a visit with Rabbi Menachem M. Schneerson. One student dies, 3 are injured.	Rashid Baz
July 29, 1994	Shooting	2	1	Pensacola, Florida	Army of God member Rev. Paul Jennings Hill murders gynecologist John Britton and Britton's bodyguard James Barrett with a shotgun at close range, outside the Ladies Center clinic in Pensacola, Florida. Hill admits to the murder, is tried, convicted, and executed by lethal injection.	Paul Jennings Hill
December 10, 1994	Bombing	1	0	North Caldwell, New Jersey	Advertising executive Thomas J. Mosser is killed by a mail bomb sent by the Unabomber (Ted Kaczynski). Mosser is the second person murdered by Kaczynski.	Ted Kaczynski (Unabomber)
December 30, 1994–December 31, 1994	Shooting	2	5	Brookline, Massachusetts, and Norfolk, Virginia	Anti-abortion activist John C. Salvi III shoots and kills 2 employees and injures 5 others in a rampage attack at a Planned Parenthood clinic in Brookline, Massachusetts. Salvi escapes and drives to Norfolk, Virginia, where Army of God (United States) spokesman Rev. Donald Spitz resides. He attacks the Planned Parenthood clinic in Norfolk, but a security guard returns fire and Salvi flees. Salvi is apprehended shortly after, and has in his possession Army of God (United States) spokesman Spitz's name and unlisted telephone number.	John C. Salvi III
April 19, 1995	Truck bombing	168	680+	Oklahoma City, Oklahoma	Oklahoma City bombing: Perpetrated by anti-government extremists Timothy McVeigh of Lockport, New York and Terry Nichols of Lapeer, Michigan parked a truck bomb in front of the Alfred P. Murrah Federal Building in downtown Oklahoma City, Oklahoma, which explodes at 9:02 a.m. killing 168 people, including 19 children, and injuring 684. The bombing destroyed more than a third of the building, which had to be demolished. The blast destroyed or damaged 324 other buildings and caused an estimated $652 million worth of damage. The Federal Emergency Management Agency (FEMA) activated 11 of its Urban Search and Rescue Task Forces, consisting of 665 rescue workers. A rescue worker was later killed after being struck on the head by falling debris after the bombing. McVeigh and Terry Nichols are convicted in the bombing, motivated by their outrage over the FBI's handling of the Waco Siege. The bombing remains the deadliest act of domestic terrorism in U.S. history.	Timothy McVeigh and Terry Nichols
April 24, 1995	Bombing	1	0	Sacramento, California	Timber industry lobbyist Gilbert P. Murray, is killed in the third and final mailbomb attack by the Unabomber.	Ted Kaczynski (Unabomber)
October 9, 1995	Rail sabotage	1	78	Palo Verde, Arizona	1995 Palo Verde, Arizona, derailment: A train was intentionally derailed, killing a sleeping car attendant and injuring 78 people. No suspects were ever arrested, but a note was left at the scene attacking the ATF and FBI for the Waco siege and Ruby Ridge standoff.	Unknown
April 12, 1996	Bombing	0	2	Vacaville, California	A bombing targeted the pickup truck of federal mine inspector Gene Ainslie, injuring him and his wife, Rita. The attack was motivated by anti-government sentiment and occurred shortly after a threatening phone call referencing Timothy McVeigh. Property damage was minor, estimated under $1 million.	
April 12, 1996	Mass shooting, Arson	1 (+1)	10	Jackson, Mississippi	A neo-Nazi opened fire at a shopping center, killing a man and injuring 10 others, all Black. The gunman set one of the stores on fire, killing himself. He also left neo-Nazi notes at the scene.	Larry Shoemake
July 27, 1996	Bombing	1	111	(Georgia (U.S. state)) Atlanta, Georgia	Centennial Olympic Park bombing: Army of God member and adherent of the anti-Semitic and racist Christian Identity movement Eric Robert Rudolph places three pipe bombs in a backpack, which he leaves in busy Centennial Olympic Park. The bomb is discovered by security guard Richard Jewell who raises an alert. One person is killed and 111 others are wounded in the explosion. Rudolph escapes and becomes a fugitive for 10 years. Rudolph's bomb is intended to force the cancellation of the 1996 Summer Olympics in Atlanta, Georgia due to his outrage over legal abortion.	Eric Robert Rudolph
November 11, 1996	Firebombing	0	0	Bloomington, Minnesota	A firebomb was thrown through a window at the Alaskan Fur Company, causing over $2 million in damage. The Animal Liberation Front claimed responsibility for the attack, which was part of a broader campaign targeting the fur industry.	Animal Liberation Front
January 16, 1997	Bombing	0	6	(Georgia (U.S. state)) Sandy Springs, Georgia	Army of God member Eric Robert Rudolph bombs a women's health clinic in Sandy Springs, Georgia. There are two bombs; the first meant to kill people inside the clinic, the second bomb placed in the parking lot and time-delayed to kill first-responders. No one was harmed by the first bomb, but six people were injured by the second.	Eric Robert Rudolph
March 18, 1997	Firebombing	0	0	Davis, California	The Animal Liberation Front caused minor property damage (under $1 million) at the Center for Comparative Medicine, then under construction at the University of California, Davis.	Animal Liberation Front
February 21, 1997	Bombing	0	5	(Georgia (U.S. state)) Atlanta, Georgia	Otherside Lounge bombing: Army of God member Eric Robert Rudolph bombs the Otherside Lounge, a lesbian bar in Atlanta, Georgia. There are two bombs; the first left on the outdoor patio, the second bomb left in the parking lot, time-delayed to kill first-responders. The initial explosion injures five, the second bomb is discovered and disposed of by the police bomb squad. Rudolph's motive for this bombing was his outrage over the existence of homosexuality.	Eric Robert Rudolph
February 23, 1997	Shooting	1 (+1)	6	(New York (state)) New York City, New York	1997 Empire State Building shooting: Palestinian Ali Hassan Abu Kamal, opens fire on tourists from an observation deck atop the Empire State Building. He shoots 7 people, killing 1. He then kills himself.	Ali Hassan Abu Kamal
April 27, 1997–May 4, 1997	Hostage-taking, Shooting, Shootout	0 (+1)	1	Jeff Davis County, Texas	Davis Mountain Resort hostage crisis: Members of the Republic of Texas (McLaren-faction), who wants the secession of Texas from the US, kidnapped Joe and Margaret Ann Rowe and held them hostage at Davis Mountain Resort while demanding one of its member released from prison. The crisis ended when the hostage-takers agreed to surrender. One Republic of Texas member was killed in a shootout with authorities on May 3, while Joe Rowe was shot in his shoulder during the kidnapping.	Members of the Republic of Texas (McLaren-faction)
July 31, 1997	Police raid, planned suicide bombings	0	3	(New York (state)) New York City, New York	1997 Brooklyn bombing plot: Two Palestinian illegal immigrants are shot and arrested in a police raid that found two pipe bombs in a Brooklyn apartment. The bombs had been planned for suicide attacks in the New York City Subway the same day, and Gazi Ibrahim Abu Mezer was sentenced to life for the plot.	Gazi Ibrahim Abu Mezer
January 29, 1998	Bombing	1	1	Birmingham, Alabama	Army of God (United States) member Eric Robert Rudolph bombs a women's clinic in Birmingham, Alabama, killing 1 and critically injuring another.	Eric Robert Rudolph
June 7, 1998	Murder	1	0	Jasper, Texas	Three white men drag James Byrd Jr. to his death behind their truck and leave his body in front of an African-American church.	Shawn Berry, Lawrence Russell Brewer, John King
June 18, 1999	Arson	0	0	Sacramento, California	Brothers Matthew and Tyler Williams, inspired by the Christian Identity movement and anti-Semitic literature, set fires to Congregation B'nai Israel, Congregation Beth Shalom, and Knesset Israel Torah Center in Sacramento, California. The fires cause more than $1 million in damage.	Matthew and Tyler Williams
July 1, 1999	Shooting	2	0	Happy Valley, California	Murders of Gary Matson and Winfield Mowder: The Williams brothers murder gay couple Gary Matson and Winfield Mowder in Happy Valley, California.	Matthew and Tyler Williams
July 2, 1999	Arson	0	0	Sacramento, California	The Williams brothers set fire to the Country Club Medical Building in Sacramento County, California, which houses an abortion clinic.	Matthew and Tyler Williams
July 2, 1999–July 4, 1999:	Shootings	2 (+1)	9	/ Illinois and Indiana	1999 Independence Day weekend shootings: Neo-Nazi World Church of the Creator/Creativity member Benjamin Nathaniel Smith goes on a two-state shooting spree in Indiana and Illinois. Starting on July 2, Smith wounds nine Orthodox Jews in drive-by shootings in Chicago. Smith then shoots and kills former college basketball coach Ricky Byrdsong, an African-American man, in Skokie, Illinois. On July 3, Smith travels to Decatur, where he wounds an African-American minister. On July 4, he kills Won-Joon Yoon, a 26-year-old Korean graduate student, in Bloomington, Indiana. Along his route, he shoots at and misses another nine people. He kills himself in a chase with police on July 4.	Benjamin Nathaniel Smith
August 10, 1999	Shootings	1	5	Los Angeles, California	Los Angeles Jewish Community Center shooting: Neo-Nazi Aryan Nations member Buford O. Furrow Jr., armed with an Uzi-type sub-machine gun, walks into the lobby of the North Valley Jewish Community Center in Granada Hills, California and begins spraying bullets, wounding five. Furrow then flees, later killing Filipino-American postal worker Joseph Ileto for being a minority and a federal employee. Furrow surrendered himself to the FBI, and pleaded guilty to avoid the death penalty.	Buford O. Furrow Jr (Aryan Nations)
December 31, 1999	Arson	0	0	East Lansing, Michigan	Four members of the Earth Liberation Front start a fire in Michigan State University's Agriculture Hall causing $1 million in damage.	Earth Liberation Front

=== 2000s ===
Date	Type	Dead	Injured	Location(s)	Details	Perpetrator
March 1, 2000	Shootings	3	2	Wilkinsburg, Pennsylvania	2000 Wilkinsburg shooting: A man shot and killed a white maintenance worker at his apartment, then proceeded to a Burger King and McDonald's restaurant, where he killed two white men and injured two. Writings at the shooter's home indicated he was targeting white men, and witnesses testified the shooter said "Not you, sister" and spared a Black woman during the shootings.	Ronald Taylor
April 28, 2000	Shootings	5	1	Greater Pittsburgh, Pennsylvania	A white supremacist killed five people and injured one in a series of shootings in the Greater Pittsburgh area. He killed his Jewish neighbor and set her apartment on fire. He vandalized a synagogue in Scott Township, then shot two employees of an Indian grocery store nearby. After shooting out the windows of a synagogue in Carnegie, he proceeded to the Robinson Town Centre, where he shot two employees of a Chinese restaurant. In Center Township, he killed a Black man outside of a karate school. He was arrested in Ambridge and was sentenced to death.	Richard Baumhammers
September 22, 2000	Mass shooting	1	6	Roanoke, Virginia	2000 Roanoke shooting: A man intending to kill LGBTQ individuals and motivated by homophobia open fire in a majority gay and lesbian bar, killing one and injuring six.	Ronald Edward Gay
October 10, 2000	Firebombing	0	0	(New York (state)) New York City, New York	2000 New York terror attack: Three young men of Arab descent hurled crude Molotov cocktails at a synagogue in The Bronx, New York to "strike a blow in the Middle East conflict between Israel and Palestine".	Mazin Assi and co-conspirators
October 13, 2000	Firebombing	0	0	(New York (state)) Syracuse, New York	Firebombing of Temple Beth El (Syracuse)	Ramsi Uthman
May 21, 2001	Firebombing	0	0	(Washington (state)) Seattle, Washington	University of Washington firebombing incident: The Center for Urban Horticulture at the University of Washington is burned by the Earth Liberation Front. The replacement building costs $7 million ($12,728,000 today). Earth Liberation Front members pled guilty.	Earth Liberation Front
September 11, 2001	Aircraft hijackings, suicide attacks	2,977 (+19)	6,000+	(New York (state)) New York City, New York; Arlington County, Virginia; Shanksville, Pennsylvania	September 11 attacks: Aircraft hijackings and suicide attacks carried out against the United States by the al-Qaeda Network, killing 2,507 civilians, 343 firefighters, 72 law enforcement officers, 55 military personnel, and 19 perpetrators. Four domestic commercial airliners were hijacked simultaneously while flying within the Northeastern United States; two flew directly into the Twin Towers of the World Trade Center in New York City, the third into the Pentagon in Arlington County, Virginia, and the fourth (thanks to the revolt by the passengers and crew members) into a field near Shanksville, Pennsylvania, during a failed attempt to destroy its intended target in Washington, D.C., either the White House or the United States Capitol. The Twin Towers collapsed, and the Pentagon received extensive damage in the western side of the building. Building 7 of the World Trade Center was also destroyed in the attack, though there were no casualties.	al-Qaeda
September 15, 2001–October 4, 2001	Shootings	2	1	Dallas and Mesquite, Texas	A white supremacist shot three men over the course of several weeks, killing two and injuring Rais Bhuiyan. He said he was targeting Arabs and Muslims as revenge for 9/11, though the victims were all of South Asian descent and one was Hindu. He was arrested on October 5 and was executed in 2011.	Mark Anthony Stroman
December 12, 2001	Attempted Bombing	0	0	Culver City, California	2001 JDL plot in California: Jewish Defense League leader Irv Rubin and member Earl Krugel were charged with planning a series of bomb attacks against the Muslim Public Affairs Council in Los Angeles, the King Fahd Mosque in Culver City, and the San Clemente office of Arab-American Congressman Darrell Issa, in the wake of the September 11 attacks.	Jewish Defense League
September 18, 2001–November 2001	Bioterrorism	5	17	United States	2001 anthrax attacks: Letters tainted with anthrax killed five across the U.S., with politicians and media officials as the apparent targets. On July 31, 2008, Bruce E. Ivins, a top biodefense researcher, committed suicide. On August 6, 2008, the FBI concluded that Ivins was solely responsible for the attacks, and suggested that Ivins wanted to bolster support for a vaccine he helped create and that he targeted two lawmakers because they were Catholics who held pro-choice views. However, subsequent evaluations have found that the FBI's investigation failed to provide any direct evidence linking Ivins to the mailings.	Unknown, Bruce Edward Ivins named as perpetrator by FBI
December 22, 2001	Bombing	0	1	Miami, Florida	2001 failed shoe bomb attempt: An al-Qaeda operative attempted to detonate a bomb concealed in his shoes while on board a plane from Paris to Miami. He failed to detonate it and was apprehended by passengers and crew.	Richard Reid
January 5, 2002	Aircraft hijackings, suicide attacks	0 (+1)	0	Tampa, Florida	2002 Tampa Cessna 172 crash: A 15-year-old high school student stole a plane from his flight school in Tarpon Springs and flew north to Tampa, where he crashed into an office building in downtown Tampa, killing himself. He was motivated by Osama bin Laden and left a note saying he was acting on behalf of al-Qaeda.	Charles J. Bishop
May 8, 2002	Dirty Bomb	0	0	Chicago, Illinois	Abdullah al-Muhajir was arrested for planning to use a radiological bomb.	Abdullah al-Muhajir
July 4, 2002	Shooting	2 (+1)	4	Los Angeles, California	2002 Los Angeles International Airport shooting: Hesham Mohamed Hadayet, a 41-year-old Egyptian national, killed two Israelis and wounds four others at the El Al ticket counter at Los Angeles International Airport. The FBI concluded this was terrorism, though they did not find evidence linking Hadayet to a terrorist group.	Hesham Mohamed Hadayet
February 16, 2002–October 24, 2002	Shootings	17	10	Montgomery County, Maryland; Beltway, Virginia (Washington, D.C.) Washington, D.C.	Beltway sniper attacks: During three weeks in October 2002, John Allen Muhammad and Lee Boyd Malvo shot and killed 10 people and critically injured three others in the cities of Washington D.C., Baltimore, Maryland and the state of Virginia. The pair were also suspected of earlier shootings in Maryland, Alabama, Arizona, Georgia, Louisiana, and Washington. At the 2006 trial of Muhammad, Malvo testified that the aim of the killing spree was to kidnap children for the purpose of extorting money from the government, even though no one was kidnapped.	John Allen Muhammad and Lee Boyd Malvo
February 8, 2003–March 20, 2003	Shootings	4	1	(New York (state)) New York City, New York	A man shot and killed four immigrants over the course of the month. The four victims were an Indo-Guyanese grocer, an Indian convenience store worker, a Ukrainian laundromat manager, and a Yemeni market employee. The man told police he was motivated by voices telling him to avenge the 9/11 attacks.	Larme Price
March 19, 2003	Sabotage	0	0	(New York (state)) New York City, New York	Iyman Faris was arrested for plotting to destroy the Brooklyn Bridge.	Iyman Faris
December 8, 2003	Shootout	2	0 (+1)	Abbeville, South Carolina	2003 Abbeville right-of-way standoff: Two police officers were killed in a shootout with three "sovereign citizens".	Arthur, Rita and Steven Bixby
March 3, 2006	Vehicle assault	0	9	Chapel Hill, North Carolina	UNC SUV attack: Mohammed Reza Taheri-azar injured 9 when he drove an SUV into a group of pedestrians at UNC-Chapel Hill to "avenge the deaths or murders of Muslims around the world".	Mohammed Reza Taheri-azar
July 28, 2006	Shooting, hostage taking	1	5	(Washington (state)) Seattle, Washington	Seattle Jewish Federation shooting: Naveed Afzal Haq, an American citizen of Pakistani descent, killed one woman and shoots five others at the Jewish Federation building in Seattle. During the shooting, Haq told a 911 dispatcher that he was angry with American foreign policy in the Middle East.	Naveed Afzal Haq
October 26, 2007	Bombing	0	0	(New York (state)) New York City, New York	A pair of improvised explosive devices were thrown at the Mexican Consulate in New York City. The fake grenades were filled with black powder, and detonated by fuses, causing very minor damage. Police were investigating the connection between this and a similar attack against the British Consulate in New York in 2005.	Unknown
March 3, 2008	Arson	0	0	(Washington (state)) Woodinville, Washington	Street of Dreams arson fires: Four luxury woodland houses near Woodinville, Washington were torched, leaving behind a message crediting the Earth Liberation Front.	Earth Liberation Front
March 6, 2008	Bombing	0	0	(New York (state)) New York City, New York	Times Square bombing: A homemade bomb damaged an Armed Forces Recruiting Office in Times Square. In June 2013, The FBI and New York City police offered a $65,000 reward for information in the case and revealed that ammunition used for the bomb is the same as is used in the Iraq and Afghanistan war zones. On April 15, 2015, the F.B.I increased the award to $115,000 and said they have persons of interest	Unknown
May 4, 2008	Bombing	0	0	San Diego, California	Multiple pipe bombs exploded at 1:40 am at the Edward J. Schwartz United States Courthouse in San Diego causing "considerable damage" to the entrance and lobby and sending shrapnel two blocks away, but causing no injuries. The FBI is investigating links between this attack and an April 25 explosion at the FedEx building also in San Diego.	Rachel Lynn Carlock and Danny Love Sr.
July 27, 2008	Shooting	2	6	Knoxville, Tennessee	Knoxville Unitarian Universalist church shooting: 58-year-old Jim David Adkisson opened fire on a Universalist church because he wanted to kill Democrats and Liberals.	Jim Adkisson
August 24, 2008	Assassination	0	0	Denver, Colorado	Barack Obama assassination plot in Denver: Three men (Cousins Tharin Gartrell, Shawn Adolf and Nathan Johnson) attempted to assassinate then Democratic 2008 presidential candidate Barack Obama at the Democratic National Convention in Denver, Colorado but were later arrested with narcotics and weapons.	Cousins Tharin Gartrell, Shawn Adolf and Nathan Johnson
October 22, 2008	Assassination	0	0	Brownsville, Tennessee	Barack Obama assassination plot in Tennessee: Two neo-Nazi white power skinheads and members of the Supreme White Alliance (SWA) Paul Schlesselman and Daniel Cowart attempted to assassinate Barack Obama followed by a killing spree of 88 (a reference to the Nazi slogan Heil Hitler) African-Americans of which 14 (a reference to The Fourteen Words) were to be beheaded many of whom were young students at an unidentified school and rob a gun store for additional weapons and commit home robberies. The two would be arrested later with several weapons in possession.	Paul Schlesselman and Daniel Cowart
April 4, 2009	Ambush, Mass shooting, Shootout	3	2 (+1)	Pittsburgh, Pennsylvania	2009 shooting of Pittsburgh police officers: 22-year old Richard Poplawski, bearing a bullet proof west and "lying in wait, ambushed police offers unaware he was armed after they responded to an emergency call by his mother. After hours of standoff he was hit by gunfire in his leg and surrendered with the whole ordeal leaving three officers dead and one injured by gunfire with another suffering a broken leg after a fence he was scaling collapsed. Poplawski had frequently ranted about Jews and "ZOG" as well as being a concurrent visitor and poster to white supremacist and conspiracy websites.	Richard Poplawski
April 8, 2009	Cyberattack, sabotage	0	0	United States	According to a report in the Wall Street Journal, intruders left malware in power grids, water, and sewage systems that could be activated at a later date. While the attacks which have occurred over a period of time seem to have originated in China and Russia, it is unknown if they are state-sponsored or errors in the computer code.	Unknown
May 25, 2009	Bombing	0	0	(New York (state)) New York City, New York	17-year-old Kyle Shaw set off a crude explosive device at a Starbucks at East 92nd Street on the Upper East Side of Manhattan, shattering windows and destroying a bench at the coffee shop. There were no injuries. The attack was a "bizarre tribute" of the movie Fight Club, in an attempt to emulate "Project Mayhem", a series of assaults on corporate America portrayed in the film. Shaw took a plea agreement and was sentenced to 3.5 years in prison in November 2010.	Kyle Shaw
May 30, 2009	Home invasion, burglary	2	1 (+1)	Arivaca, Arizona	Murders of Raul and Brisenia Flores: A trio of nativist members of a vigilante group broke into the Flores family home and fatally shot Raul Flores and his daughter Brisenia. The victims' wife and mother was injured exchanging gunfire with the assailants, hitting one of them. Two of the assailants were sentenced to death.	Shawna Forde, Jason Eugene Bush, and Albert Gaxiola
May 31, 2009	Assassination, shooting	1	0	Wichita, Kansas	Assassination of George Tiller: Scott Roeder shoots and kills Dr. George Tiller in a Wichita, Kansas church. Roeder, an anti-abortion extremist who believes in justifiable homicide of abortion providers, was arrested soon afterward. Roeder was convicted of the crime and sentenced to 50 years in prison in 2010. Tiller, who performed late-term abortions, had long been a target of anti-abortion extremists; his clinic was firebombed in 1986 and Tiller was shot and wounded five times in 1993 in a shooting attack by Shelley Shannon.	Scott Roeder
June 1, 2009	Shooting	1	1	Little Rock, Arkansas	Arkansas recruiting office shooting: Abdulhakim Mujahid Muhammad shot and killed one military recruiter and seriously wounded another at a Little Rock, Arkansas Army/Navy Career Center in an act of Islamic extremism. Muhammad, a convert to Islam, had visited Yemen for sixteen months where he spent time in prison and became radicalized. Muhammad, said he was part of Al-Qaeda in the Arabian Peninsula and was upset over the U.S. Army's murder of Muslims in Iraq and Afghanistan, like the Kandahar massacre and the Abu Ghraib prison scandal.	Abdulhakim Mujahid Muhammad
June 1, 2009	Shooting	1	1 (+1)	Washington, D.C.	United States Holocaust Memorial Museum shooting: Elderly neo-Nazi, white supremacist and Holocaust denier James von Brunn, who had previously attempted to kidnap Federal Reserve employees in 1981, shot and killed a black police officer at the United States Holocaust Museum before being wounded by other officers.	James Wenneker von Brunn
November 5, 2009	Shooting	13	32 (+1)	Killeen, Texas	2009 Fort Hood shooting: Nidal Malik Hasan, a US Army Major serving as a Psychiatrist, opens fire at Fort Hood, Texas, killing 13 and wounding 29. On August 23, 2013, Hasan was convicted by a Military tribunal. Hasan acted as his own attorney and took responsibility for the attack saying his motive was jihad to fight "illegal and immoral aggression against Muslims". On August 28, Hasan was sentenced to death.	Nidal Malik Hasan
December 25, 2009	Bombing	0	2 (+1)	Detroit, Michigan	Northwest Airlines Flight 253: Umar Farouk Abdulmutallab attempted to blow up Northwest Airlines flight 253 using plastic explosives sewn into his underwear while en route from Amsterdam to Detroit.	Umar Farouk Abdulmutallab

=== 2010s ===
Date	Type	Dead	Injured	Location(s)	Details	Perpetrator
February 18, 2010	Suicide attack	1 (+1)	13	Austin, Texas	Austin suicide attack: Andrew Joseph Stack III, flying his single-engine plane, flew into the Austin, Texas IRS building; killing himself and one IRS employee and injuring 13 others. Stack left a suicide note online, comparing the IRS to Big Brother from the novel 1984.	Joe Stack
March 4, 2010	Shooting	0 (+1)	2	Arlington County, Virginia	2010 Pentagon shooting: John Patrick Bedell shot and wounded two Pentagon police officers at a security checkpoint in the Pentagon station of the Washington Metro rapid transit system in Arlington County, Virginia.	John Patrick Bedell
April 20, 2010	Mass shooting	1 (+1)	4	Wichita Falls, Texas	A 22-year old man entered a book café and walked up to a table with four Black and Hispanic women saying a racial slur and proclaiming it was Hitler's birthday before shooting and wounding them. During the shooting he was yelling "White power". He then left the café and went to a bar where he killed a White bouncer who tried to take the gun away from him. Shortly thereafter he shot and mortally wounded himself.	Ross William Muehlberger
May 1, 2010	Bombing	0	0	(New York (state)) New York City	2010 Times Square car bombing attempt: Faisal Shahzad ignited an explosive in Times Square. The bomb failed to go off, and he was later arrested on a flight leaving for Dubai. Sentenced to life in prison on October 5, 2010, after pleading guilty to a 10-count indictment in June, including attempting to use a weapon of mass destruction.	Faisal Shahzad
May 20, 2010	Shooting	2 (+2)	2	West Memphis, Arkansas	2010 West Memphis police shootings: Two West Memphis police officers were killed by a father and son who supported the sovereign citizen movement during a traffic stop. The suspects were later killed by other officers.	Jerry and Joseph Kane
July 18, 2010	Shooting, Shootout	0	2 (+1)	Oakland, California	Oakland freeway shootout: A heavily armed man got into a shootout with police officer after being stopped on the freeway. He was on the way to attack the San Francisco offices of the Tides Foundation and the American Civil Liberties Union in order to murder prominent people of the organizations and start a "revolution". Two officers got lightly injured by broken glass and the perpetrator was struck many times, surviving thanks to the body armor he was wearing.	Byron Williams
September 1, 2010	Hostage taking	0 (+1)	0	Silver Spring, Maryland	Discovery Communications headquarters hostage crisis: James J. Lee, armed with two starter pistols and an explosive device, takes three people hostage in the lobby of the Discovery Communications headquarters in Silver Spring, Maryland before being killed by police. After nearly four hours, Lee was shot dead by police and all the hostages were freed without injury. Lee had earlier posted a manifesto railing against population growth and immigration.	James J. Lee
October 2010	Bombing	0	0	Virginia	Farooque Ahmed conspired with law enforcement officials posing as al-Qaeda to bomb Arlington National Cemetery, the Pentagon City subway station, Crystal City subway station, and Court House subway station.	Farooque Ahmed
October 29, 2010	Bombing	0	0	Chicago, Illinois	Cargo planes bomb plot: Two plastic explosive bombs were discovered on two cargo planes destined for two synagogues in Chicago. They were discovered at East Midlands Airport and Dubai International Airport while en route.	al-Qaeda in the Arabian Peninsula
October 17, 2010–November 2, 2010	Bombing and Shooting	0	0	Virginia	Northern Virginia military shootings: A series of shootings took place at the five military buildings including the National Museum of the Marine Corps and the Pentagon. The perpetrator also attempted to bomb and damage Arlington National Cemetery.	Yonathan Melaku
November 25, 2010	Bombing	0	0	Portland, Oregon	2010 Portland car bomb plot: Mohamed Osman Mohamud attempted to detonate what he thought was a car bomb at a Christmas tree lighting ceremony.	Mohamed Osman Mohamud
January 17, 2011	Attempted Bombing	0	0	(Washington (state)) Spokane, Washington	Spokane bombing attempt: A radio-controlled-shaped pipe bomb was found and defused in Spokane, Washington along the route of that year's Martin Luther King Jr. memorial march. On March 9, 2011, the Federal Bureau of Investigation (FBI) arrested Kevin William Harpham, 36, of Addy, Washington. On December 20, 2011, he was sentenced to 32 years in prison for the attempted bombing.	Kevin William Harpham
May 25, 2011	Bombing	0	0	Bowling Green, Kentucky	Two Iraqi immigrants were arrested for sending money and weapons to Iraq while residing in Bowling Green, Kentucky, as well as participating in attacks while in Iraq and plotting to kill American soldiers on their return.	Mohanad Shareef Hammadi and Waad Ramadan Alwan
November 11, 2011	Shooting	0	0	(Washington, D.C.) Washington, D.C.	2011 White House shooting : Oscar Ramiro Ortega-Hernandez drove from Idaho and fired multiple shots at the White House from his car after becoming convinced Obama was the "anti-Christ" and saying he was "on a mission from God" to kill the president. He was also mad at perceived US bullying of foreign nations like the wars Afghanistan and Iraq as well as thinking the government was attempting to control the US population by GPS, fluoride and aspartame. He later pleaded guilty to terrorism charges.	Oscar Ramiro Ortega-Hernandez
December 6, 2011	Shooting	2	0	(Georgia (U.S. state)) Fort Stewart, Georgia	Killing of Michael Roark and Tiffany York: 19-year-old Michael Roark and his girlfriend, 17-year-old Tiffany York, members of the right-wing terrorist organization FEAR were killed by fellow group members, which was planning the assassination of president Barack Obama.	FEAR
June 18, 2012	Bombing	0	0 (+1)	Plano, Texas	Anson Chi, a Sovereign citizen and anti-government extremist, attempted to destroy an above-ground natural gas pipeline in a residential area. The bomb however exploded prematurely, badly injuring himself as well as causing a hole and leakage of the pipeline.	Anson Chi
August 5, 2012	Shooting	7 (+1)	3	Oak Creek, Wisconsin	Wisconsin Sikh temple shooting: Six people were killed and four others were injured, including a man who died of his wounds in 2020 and a police officer who was tending to victims at a Sikh temple in Oak Creek, Wisconsin. The gunman, 40-year-old Wade Michael Page a neo-Nazi white power skinhead and member of the Hammerskin Nation/Hammerskins, killed himself after being shot by police. The shooting is being treated by authorities as an act of domestic terrorism. While a motive has not been clearly defined, Page had been active in white supremacist groups.	Wade Michael Page
August 15, 2012	Shooting	0	1	(Washington, D.C.) Washington, D.C.	On August 15, 2012, Floyd Lee Corkins II, wielding a 9mm pistol along with two magazines and 50 rounds of ammunition, entered the lobby of Family Research Council's Washington, D.C. headquarters. Corkins shot an employee, 46-year-old Leonardo Johnson, in the left arm. While injured, Johnson assisted others who wrestled the gunman to the ground until police arrived and placed the gunman under arrest. Johnson was taken to a hospital to treat his wound. Corkins committed the shooting because of the Family Research Council's opposition to same-sex marriage.	Floyd Lee Corkins II
November 27, 2012	Bombing	0	0	Casa Grande, Arizona	Casa Grande bombing: An Iraqi national set off a bomb outside a Social Security Administration building. He was arrested and charged with the bombing, as well as an earlier, unrelated murder.	Abdullatif Ali Aldosary
February 3, 2013–February 12, 2013	Shootings	4 (+1)	6	California	Christopher Dorner shootings and manhunt: Former LAPD officer Chris Dorner goes on a killing spree targeting police officers and their families throughout Southern California. Dorner was eventually killed in a shootout and fire in Big Bear Lake, California. Dorner stated he committed the shootings in response to police brutality.	Chris Dorner
March 19, 2013	Assassination	2 (+1)	0	Monument, Colorado	A white supremacist killed a pizza delivery driver on March 17 and stole his uniform. Two days later, he arrived at the home of Colorado Department of Corrections Director Tom Clements and shot him. After a multi-day search, police found the assassin in Texas and killed him in a shoot-out. The assassin had forced the pizza delivery drive to record a video blaming prison officials for putting the assassin and other prisoners in solitary confinement.	Evan Spencer Ebel
April 15, 2013	Bombings, shootout	4 (+1)	280 (+1)	Boston, Massachusetts	Boston Marathon bombing: Two bombs detonated within seconds of each other near the finish line of the Boston Marathon, killing 3 and injuring more than 180 people. On the evening of April 18 in Cambridge, Massachusetts, an MIT campus police officer was shot and killed while sitting in his squad car. Two suspects then carjacked an SUV and fled to nearby Watertown, Massachusetts, a suburb of Boston. A massive police chase ensued, resulting in a shootout during which several IED's were thrown by the suspects. A Boston transit police officer was critically wounded and suspect Tamerlan Tsarnaev, a Russian immigrant of Chechen ethnicity, was killed. The second suspect, Tsarnaev's younger brother Dzhokhar Tsarnaev, escaped. A "Shelter in place" order was given for Boston, Watertown, and surrounding areas while house-to-house searches were conducted, but the suspect remained at large. Shortly after the search was called off Tsarnaev was discovered hiding inside a boat parked near the scene of the shootout. He was taken into custody after another exchange of gunfire, treated for injuries received during his pursuit and capture, and arraigned on federal terrorism charges. Preliminary questioning indicated the Tsarnaev brothers had no ties to terrorist organizations. A note written by Dzhokhar Tsarnaev on the boat where he was captured said the bombings were retaliation for US actions in Iraq and Afghanistan against Muslims. On April 8, 2015, Dzhokhar Tsarnaev was found guilty on all 30 counts related to the bombing and shootout with police. On May 15, 2015, Tsarnaev was sentenced to death.	Dzhokhar and Tamerlan Tsarnaev
April 16, 2013	Bioterrorism	0	0	Washington, D.C.	April 2013 ricin letters: Two letters, sent to Mississippi Republican Senator Roger Wicker and president Barack Obama, were tested positive for ricin. Each letter contained the message "I am KC and I approve this message". On April 27, 2013, a man named Everett Dutschke was arrested.	James Everett Dutschke
April 16, 2013	Shooting	0	0	California	Metcalf sniper attack: Multiple gunmen damage electrical transformers at Pacific Gas and Electric Company's Metcalf Transmission Substation in Coyote, California. The attack caused $15 million in damage but no perpetrators were ever identified.	Unknown
November 1, 2013	Shooting	1	6 (+1)	Los Angeles, California	2013 Los Angeles International Airport shooting: Paul Anthony Ciancia entered the checkpoint at the Los Angeles International Airport and fired his rifle, killing one Transportation Security Administration officer and injuring six others. The motivation behind the attack was Paul's inspiration of the anti-government agenda, such as believing in the New World Order conspiracy theory, and stating that he "wanted to kill TSA" and described them as "pigs".	Paul Anthony Ciancia
December 13, 2013	Bombing attempt	0	0	Wichita, Kansas	2013 Wichita bombing attempt: 58-year-old avionics technician, identified as Terry Lee Loewen, was arrested on December 13, 2013, for attempting a suicide bombing at Wichita Mid-Continent Airport, where he was employed. Loewen became radicalized after reading extremist Islamic material on the Internet. He was arrested while driving a vehicle into the airport with what he believed to be an active explosive device. Later sentenced to 20 years in Federal prison.	Terry Lee Loewen
April 13, 2014	Shootings	3	0	Overland Park, Kansas	Overland Park Jewish Community Center shooting: A pair of shootings committed by a lone gunman occurred at the Jewish Community Center of Greater Kansas City and Village Shalom, a Jewish retirement community, in Overland Park, Kansas. A total of three people died in the shootings. One suspect, identified as Frazier Glenn Miller, Jr., a former member of the Carolina Knights of the Ku Klux Klan and its offshoot the White Patriot Party and a neo-Nazi Odinist pagan, was arrested and charged with capital murder, first-degree murder, attempted first-degree murder, and aggravated assault.	Frazier Glenn Miller, Jr.
April 27, 2014	Shootings	1	0	(Washington (state)) Seattle, Washington	Ali Muhammad Brown shot and killed a man who was walking home from a store. This killing was part of a series of terrorism related killings in the states of Washington and New Jersey.	Ali Muhammad Brown
June 1, 2014	Shootings	2	0	(Washington (state)) Seattle, Washington	Ali Muhammad Brown shot and killed two men outside a Seattle gay nightclub. These killings were part of a series of terrorism related killings in the states of Washington and New Jersey.	Ali Muhammad Brown
June 8, 2014	Shooting	3 (+2)	0	Las Vegas, Nevada	2014 Las Vegas shootings: Two police officers and one civilian died in a shooting spree in the Las Vegas Valley committed by a couple, identified as Jerad and Amanda Miller, who espoused anti-government views and were reportedly inspired by the outcome of the Bundy standoff. The Millers both died during a gunfight with responding police; Jerad Miller was fatally shot by officers, while Amanda Miller committed suicide after being wounded.	Jerad and Amanda Miller
June 25, 2014	Shootings	1	0	West Orange, New Jersey	Ali Muhammad Brown shot and killed a man who was driving home from college while stopped at a traffic light. This killing was part of a series of terrorism related killings in the states of Washington and New Jersey.	Ali Muhammad Brown
September 12, 2014	Shooting	1	1	Blooming Grove, Pennsylvania	2014 Pennsylvania State Police barracks attack: Two Pennsylvania State Policeman are shot in a sniper attack nearby a police barracks, one dies. Eric Frein is arrested for the shooting after a 48-day manhunt.	Eric Frein
September 24, 2014	Stabbing	1	1 (+1)	Moore, Oklahoma	Vaughan Foods beheading incident: Alton Alexander Nolen aka "Jah'Keem Yisrael" attacked two employees at Vaughan Foods, beheading one and stabbing the other before being shot and injured by Vaughan Foods' Chief Operating Officer.	Alton Alexander Nolen
October 23, 2014	Melee attack	0 (+1)	3	(New York (state)) New York City, New York	2014 New York City hatchet attack: Zale Thompson injured two New York City Police Department (NYPD) officers, once critically at a Queens, New York City shopping district by striking them with a hatchet. Four officers were posing for a photograph when Thompson charged them. The police opened fire killing Thompson and injuring a civilian. Thompson, who converted to Islam 2 years before the attack, posted "anti-government, anti-Western, anti-white" messages online.	Zale Thompson
November 28, 2014	Spree shooting, Arson, Shootout	0 (+1)	0	Austin, Texas	A 49-year old man wearing a tactical vest went on a spree shooting and fired over 100 rounds at the Mexican consulate which he also tried to burn down, a federal courthouse, a bank and the Austin Police Department headquarters. The gunman was killed after shooting at approaching police officers and had in his car weapons and ammunition, a gasmask, homemade explosives, a list of 34 targets, including churches, as well as a copy of a book associated with a White supremacist and Christian extremist group. In the book he had written a note calling himself a "priest in the fight against anti-God people".	Larry McQuilliams
December 2014	Cyberattack	0	0	United States	"The Guardians of Peace" linked by the United States to North Korea launched a cyber attack against SONY pictures. Embarrassing private emails were published and the organization threatened attacks against theaters that showed The Interview, a satire which depicted the assassination of North Korean leader Kim Jong Un. Following the refusal of theater chains to show the movie, Sony Pictures withdrew release of the movie, a decision that was criticized by President Obama and others. Obama said the USA will respond. North Korea denied responsibility for the attack and proposed a joint investigation with the U.S.	"The Guardians of Peace"; North Korea (suspected)
December 20, 2014	Shooting	2 (+1)	1	(New York (state)) New York City, New York	Murder of Rafael Ramos and Wenjian Liu: A man shot and killed two NYPD officers as they sat in their vehicle on a lunch break in Bedford–Stuyvesant, Brooklyn. Earlier in the day, the gunman shot and injured his ex-girlfriend in Maryland. The gunman killed himself in a subway station as police pursued him. The gunman had posted on his girlfriend's Instagram account saying he was planning on killing two police officers in retaliations for the police killings of Michael Brown and Eric Garner, the latter of which occurred in New York.	Ismaaiyl Brinsley
May 3, 2015	Shooting	0 (+2)	1	Garland, Texas	Curtis Culwell Center attack: Two gunmen opened fire outside the Curtis Culwell Center during an art exhibit hosted by an anti-Muslim group called the American Freedom Defense Initiative in Garland, Texas. The center was hosting a contest for cartoons depicting the Muslim prophet Muhammad. Both gunmen were killed by police. A Garland Independent School District (ISD) police officer was injured by a shot to the ankle but survived. The attackers, Elton Simpson and Nadir Soofi, were motivated by the Charlie Hebdo shooting in France and the 2015 Copenhagen shooting in Denmark earlier in the year. The Islamic State of Iraq and the Levant claimed responsibility for the attack through a Twitter post.	Elton Simpson, Nadir Hamid Soofi, and Abdul Malik Abdul Kareem
June 2, 2015	Stabbing	0 (+1)	0	Boston, Massachusetts	Police investigating a planned Islamic terrorist attack on police confronted Usaama Rahim to question him. He pulled out a military knife, and was eventually shot and killed by police as he approached them with the knife. David Wright was later arrested and charged with planning a terrorist attack with Usaama Rahim.	Usaama Rahim and David Wright
June 17, 2015	Mass shooting	9	1	Charleston, South Carolina	Charleston church shooting: Dylann Roof, a white supremacist from Columbia, South Carolina, opened fire on Emanuel African Methodist Episcopal Church in Charleston, South Carolina killing 9 African-Americans including South Carolina state senator Clementa Pinckney.	Dylann Roof
July 16, 2015	Shootings	5 (+1)	2	Chattanooga, Tennessee	2015 Chattanooga shootings: Muhammad Youssef Abdulazeez opened fire on two military installations in Chattanooga, Tennessee. He first committed a drive-by shooting at a recruiting center, then traveled to a naval reserve center and continued firing. He was killed by police in a gunfight. Four Marines were killed immediately, and another Marine, a Navy sailor, and a police officer were wounded; the sailor died from his injuries two days later. The motive was Islamist terrorism, inspired by foreign terrorist organizations	Muhammad Youssef Abdulazeez
November 4, 2015	Mass stabbing	0 (+1)	4	Merced, California	University of California, Merced stabbing attack: Faisal Mohammad, armed with a hunting knife, stabbed four people at the University of California before being shot and killed by police.	Faisal Mohammad
November 22, 2015	Mass shooting	0	5	Minneapolis, Minnesota	Five Black Lives Matter protesters were shot near the Minneapolis Police Department's 4th Precinct during a demonstration. The assailants, including self-identified white supremacist Allen Lawrence Scarsella, were convicted on felony assault and riot charges.	Allen Lawrence Scarsella, Joseph Martin Backman, Nathan Wayne Gustavsson, Daniel Thomas Macey
November 27, 2015	Mass shooting	3	9	Colorado Springs, Colorado	Colorado Springs Planned Parenthood shooting: Robert L. Dear, armed with a semi-automatic rifle, opened fire at a Colorado Springs Planned Parenthood clinic. Two civilians and one police officer were killed, while four civilians and five police officers were wounded before the suspect surrendered. Dear told police "No more baby parts" after being taken into custody.	Robert Dear
December 2, 2015	Mass shooting	14 (+2)	24	San Bernardino, California	2015 San Bernardino attack: A mass shooting occurred at the Inland Regional Center in San Bernardino, California, with 14 dead and 22 injured. Two suspects, Rizwan Farook and Tashfeen Malik, fled in an SUV, but were later killed.	Rizwan Farook and Tashfeen Malik
December 8, 2015	Firebombing	0	0	Grand Forks, North Dakota	Matthew William Gust, a 25-year-old man, firebombed the Juba Coffee House and Restaurant, a Somali-owned business, using a Molotov cocktail. The attack, which caused more than $250,000 in damage, followed vandalism of the building with Nazi symbols and racist graffiti. Gust pleaded guilty to arson and committing a hate crime and was sentenced to 15 years in federal prison.	Matthew William Gust
January 7, 2016	Shooting	0	1 (+1)	Philadelphia, Pennsylvania	Shooting of Jesse Hartnett: A man shot at a police officer in his cruiser multiple times, injuring him in the process. The officer returned fire injuring the assailant. The assailant later pledged allegiance to ISIL, citing it as his reason for the attack.	Edward Archer
February 11, 2016	Melee attack	0 (+1)	4	Columbus, Ohio	Ohio restaurant machete attack: Four people were injured in a restaurant when a man with a machete attacked them at random. After a car chase, the assailant, who was from the West African nation of Guinea, was killed by police.	Mohamed Barry
June 12, 2016	Mass shooting, hostage taking	49 (+1)	53	Orlando, Florida	Orlando nightclub shooting: 49 people were killed and 53 were injured in a terrorist attack at a gay nightclub in Orlando, Florida by Omar Mateen, an American-born citizen with Afghan immigrant parents who was later killed. In a 9-1-1 call during the attack, Mateen pledged allegiance to ISIL and its leader Abu Bakr al-Baghdadi, called himself an "Islamic soldier" and referenced the Boston Marathon bombers. He posted similar messages on Facebook the day of the attack. Although inspired by ISIL, Mateen had no apparent actual link to any organized terrorist group, and was apparently self-radicalized via the Internet. A characteristic of ISIL terrorism "is to permit anyone who so chooses to use its name to advance mutual goals, regardless of any actual ties to the group." There was no evidence that Mateen targeted Pulse because it was a gay club or that he was specifically motivated by anti-LGBT hate.	Omar Mateen
July 7, 2016	Mass shooting	5 (+1)	11	Dallas, Texas	2016 shooting of Dallas police officers: During a protest against the police killings of Alton Sterling and Philando Castile, a man fired at police officers, killing five. After an hours-long barricade in an El Centro College building, police killed the gunman using a bomb disposal vehicle to deliver and detonate an explosive. The gunman told a negotiator that he wanted to kill white people, especially white police officers.	Micah Xavier Johnson
July 17, 2016	Mass shooting	4 (+1)	2	Baton Rouge, Louisiana	2016 shooting of Baton Rouge police officers: Police were called on a man wielding a rifle in a parking lot. When officers arrived, the man fired at them, killing four officers (including one who died in 2022) and injuring two before being killed by a police sniper. The man was affiliated with sovereign citizen and Black nationalist groups.	Gavin Eugene Long
August 20, 2016	Stabbings	0	2	Roanoke, Virginia	On August 20, 2016, Wasil Farooqui stabbed a man and a woman in a random attack at an apartment complex.	Wasil Farooqui
September 17, 2016	Mass stabbing	0 (+1)	10	St. Cloud, Minnesota	St. Cloud mall stabbing: On September 17, 2016, a mass stabbing occurred at the Crossroads Center shopping mall in St. Cloud, Minnesota. Ten people were injured, and the attacker was shot dead inside the mall by an off-duty law enforcement officer. ISIL claimed responsibility for the attack through its Amaq media agency, claiming Adan "was a soldier of the Islamic State".	Dahir A. Adan
September 17, 2016–September 19, 2016	Bombings	0	34 (+1)	(New York (state)) New Jersey and New York City	2016 New York and New Jersey bombings: Four bombings or bombing attempts occurred in the New York metropolitan area, specifically in Seaside Park, New Jersey; Manhattan, New York; and Elizabeth, New Jersey. Thirty-one civilians were injured in one of the bombings. Ahmad Khan Rahimi was identified as a suspect in all of the incidents and apprehended on September 19 in Linden, New Jersey, after a shootout that injured three police officers. According to authorities, Rahimi was not part of a terrorist cell, but was motivated and inspired by the extremist Islamic ideology espoused by al-Qaeda founder Osama bin Laden and al-Qaeda chief propagandist Anwar al-Awlaki.	Ahmad Khan Rahimi
October 16, 2016	Firebombing	0	0	Hillsborough, North Carolina	The Orange County Republican Party office was firebombed in the early morning, and the words "Nazi Republicans leave town or else" and a swastika were spray-painted on a nearby building. No arrests were made. On the same day, the Democratic Party offices in nearby Carrboro were vandalized with the words "Death to capitalism", though officials did not believe the two incidents were related.	Unknown
November 28, 2016	Vehicle-ramming attack, stabbing	0 (+1)	13	Columbus, Ohio	Ohio State University attack: A car ramming attack and mass stabbing occurred at 9:52 a.m. EST at Ohio State University (OSU)'s Watts Hall in Columbus, Ohio. The attacker, Somali refugee Abdul Razak Ali Artan, was shot and killed by the first responding OSU police officer, and 11 people were hospitalized for injuries. According to authorities, Artan was inspired by terrorist propaganda from the Islamic State of Iraq and the Levant and radical Muslim cleric Anwar al-Awlaki.	Abdul Razak Ali Artan
March 20, 2017	Stabbing by sword	1	0	(New York (state)) New York City, New York	Murder of Timothy Caughman: James Harris Jackson, 28, traveled from his home state of Maryland to New York City with the "sole purpose of stalking and killing black men for a statement-making media spectacle" according to police. On March 20 he allegedly attacked Timothy Caughman, 66, in Midtown Manhattan with a sword, killing him. Jackson was allegedly a reader of the infamous neo-Nazi, alt-right website The Daily Stormer.	James Harris Jackson
May 16, 2017	Mass shooting	1 (+1)	5	Three Forks, Montana	On May 16, 2017, near Three Forks, Montana, Broadwater County Sheriff's Deputy Mason Moore was fatally shot during a traffic stop on Highway 287. One of the gunmen was 61-year-old Lloyd Barrus, an antigovernment extremist with a history of violent encounters with law enforcement. In 2000, Barrus had been involved in a high-speed chase and gunfight with officers in California, which included downing a police helicopter. Barrus's son Marshall was also involved; he was killed in a shootout in which Lloyd was arrested.	Lloyd and Marshall Barrus
May 26, 2017	Stabbing	2	1	Portland, Oregon	2017 Portland train attack: Jeremy Joseph Christian fatally stabbed two people and injured a third on a MAX Light Rail train, after he was confronted for directing what the Portland Police Bureau's report later said "would best be characterized as hate speech toward a variety of ethnicities and religions" at two women on a Metropolitan Area Express (MAX) light-rail train. A witness reported that Christian used anti-Muslim slurs and "was screaming that he was a taxpayer, that colored people were ruining the city, and he had First Amendment rights".	Jeremy Joseph Christian
June 14, 2017	Mass shooting	0 (+1)	6	Alexandria, Virginia	Congressional baseball shooting: During a practice session for a charity baseball game involving 24 Republican members of Congress, James Hodgkinson, a Bernie Sanders supporter, and a registered Democrat opened fire, shooting and injuring six people. The Virginia Attorney General concluded it was "an act of terrorism...fueled by rage against Republican legislators".	James Hodgkinson
June 21, 2017	Stabbing	0	2	Flint, Michigan	Bishop International Airport attack: A Canadian citizen originally from Tunisia stabbed a police officer two times in the neck and an airport maintenance worker in the hand while yelling "Allahu Akbar" at the Bishop International Airport. He planned to kill the victim in order to steal his weapon and be able to shoot other officers with it. He was motivated by Islamism and opposition to US foreign policies in Middle Eastern conflicts.	Amor Ftuohi
August 5, 2017	Bombing	0	0	Bloomington, Minnesota	On August 5, 2017, an explosive device shattered windows and damaged an office at the mosque, which primarily serves people from the area's large Somali community.	Michael McWhorter and Joe Morris
August 12, 2017	Vehicle-ramming attack	1	35	Charlottesville, Virginia	Charlottesville car attack: On August 12, 2017, James Alex Fields Jr. a member of the neo-Nazi group Vanguard America intentionally drove his car into a group of counter-demonstrators at the Unite the Right rally in Charlottesville, Virginia killing a woman named Heather Heyer in the process. The Charlottesville mayor called it "an act of domestic terrorism".	James Alex Fields Jr.
September 6, 2017	Attempted vehicle-ramming attack	0	0	Mandan, North Dakota	Gregory Lee Leingang, attempted to attack President Donald Trump during a visit to Mandan, North Dakota. Leingang stole a forklift from an oil refinery and tried to drive it toward the presidential motorcade, but the forklift became jammed. Leingang fled on foot and was arrested by police. No injuries occurred, and property damage was minor. He later admitted intent to harm the president and pleaded guilty to federal charges, including attempting to enter a restricted building while using a dangerous weapon. Leingang was sentenced to 20 years in prison.	Gregory Lee Leingang
September 24, 2017	Mass shooting	1	7 (+1)	Antioch, Tennessee	The Burnette Chapel shooting occurred On September 24, 2017, a gunman opened fire at the Burnette Chapel Church of Christ in Antioch, Tennessee, part of the Greater Nashville Area, killing one person and injuring seven others. The perpetrator was targeting White American churchgoers and was prompted by the Charleston church shooting two years ago in 2015.	Emanuel Kidega Samson
October 31, 2017	Vehicle-ramming attack	8	11 (+1)	(New York (state)) New York City, New York	2017 New York City truck attack: On October 31, 2017, an ISIS-inspired man drove a rented Home Depot flatbed pickup truck in a vehicle-ramming attack on cyclists and runners along 1 mile (1.6 km) of a bike path alongside West Street in Lower Manhattan, killing eight people and injuring at least 11 others. The attack took place several blocks north of the National September 11 Memorial & Museum. Authorities found a note near the truck used in the incident which claimed that the attack by the 29-year-old was made in the name of ISIS.	Sayfullo Saipov
November 7, 2017	Bombing	0	0	Champaign, Illinois	On November 7, 2017, Members of the White Rabbit Three Percent Illinois Patriot Freedom Fighters Militia attempted to bomb a women's health clinic. The device failed to detonate, and no injuries were reported. The group, motivated by anti-government and anti-Muslim ideologies, had also carried out a bombing at the Dar al-Farooq Islamic Center in Bloomington, Minnesota.	Michael McWhorter and Joe Morris
December 11, 2017	Attempted suicide bombing	0	6 (+1)	(New York (state)) New York City, New York	Akayed Ullah set off a bomb on his body in a tunnel that links two subway lines under the Port Authority Bus Terminal, which is a significant transportation hub in Manhattan. The explosion injured six bystanders in addition to Ullah himself. Not long prior to the attack he published a post on Facebook saying "Trump you flailed to protect your nation". He also published an ISIS slogan to let the group know he did the act on their behalf.	Akayed Ullah
January 10, 2018	Assassination	1	0	Lake Forest, California	Murder of Blaze Bernstein: A 19 year old gay Jewish University of Pennsylvania student named Blaze Bernstein was murdered by Samuel Woodward a former classmate and member of the neo-Nazi terrorist organization Atomwaffen Division.	Samuel Woodward
March 2, 2018–March 21, 2018	Package bombings	2 (+1)	6	Austin, Texas	Austin serial bombings: A series of mail bombings across different neighborhoods of Austin killed two people and injured five, including a FedEx employee at a ground facility in Schertz. After identifying the suspect, police pulled him over in Round Rock, where he set off a bomb, killing himself and injuring a police officer.	Mark Anthony Conditt
October 22, 2018–November 1, 2018	Attempted mail bombing	0	0	(United States) Several states	October 2018 United States mail bombing attempts: In late October 2018, at least 12 packages containing pipe bombs were mailed within the U.S. Postal Service system to several prominent critics of U.S. President Donald Trump, including various Democratic Party politicians (Hillary Clinton, Barack Obama, Joe Biden, Eric Holder, Debbie Wasserman Schultz, Maxine Waters, Cory Booker), actor Robert De Niro, billionaire investor George Soros, former CIA Director John O. Brennan, and former Director of National Intelligence James Clapper.	Cesar Sayoc Jr.
October 24, 2018	Attempted mass shooting	2	0	Jeffersontown, Kentucky	2018 Jeffersontown shooting: Gregory A. Bush Killed two African-Americans outside a Kroger grocery store. He also got into a shootout with armed civilian bystanders.	Gregory A. Bush
October 27, 2018	Mass shooting	11	6 (+1)	Pittsburgh, Pennsylvania	Pittsburgh synagogue shooting: Robert Bowers of Baldwin, Pennsylvania, committed a mass shooting at the Tree of Life – Or L'Simcha Congregation in the Squirrel Hill neighborhood of Pittsburgh, Pennsylvania on October 27, 2018, while Shabbat morning services were being held. Eleven people were killed and seven were injured. It was the deadliest attack on the Jewish community in the United States.	Robert Bowers
November 2, 2018	Mass shooting	2 (+1)	5	Tallahassee, Florida	2018 Tallahassee shooting: A gunman opened fire at Tallahassee Hot Yoga, a yoga studio located in Tallahassee, Florida, United States. Scott Paul Beierle shot six women, two fatally, and pistol-whipped a man before killing himself.	Scott Paul Beierle
March 24, 2019	Arson	0	0	Escondido, California	California mosque fire: The Dar-ul-Arqam mosque's parking lot was broken into at around 3:15 AM, with the arsonist using a flammable liquid to catch the mosque on fire. Seven people inside the mosque woke up and put out the fire with a fire extinguisher, with no injuries and no major damage. The arsonist left behind graffiti referencing the Christchurch mosque shootings in New Zealand. The gunman who committed the Poway synagogue shooting claimed responsibility for the arson attack in a manifesto.	John T. Earnest
March 29, 2019	Arson	0	0	New Market, Tennessee	A white supremacist set the historic Highlander Research and Education Center on fire using a sparkler bomb and Napalm. He spray-painted a white supremacist symbol on the pavement near the facility, which is known for training civil rights activists like Rosa Parks and John Lewis. The man was also charged with attempting to provide material support to Hezbollah.	Regan Prater
April 27, 2019	mass shooting	1	3	Poway, California	Poway synagogue shooting: John T. Earnest, an armed gunman motivated by antisemitism, his belief in the white genocide conspiracy theory, and inspiration by the mosque shootings in Christchurch, New Zealand, and the synagogue shooting in Pittsburgh, Pennsylvania, entered the Chabad of Poway synagogue during Sabbath services and opened fire, killing one and injuring three before fleeing. He was quickly apprehended.	John T. Earnest
June 17, 2019	Shooting	0 (+1)	1	Dallas, Texas	2019 Dallas courthouse shooting: A man fired several shots at the Earle Cabell Federal Building and Courthouse, failing to hit anyone. One person suffered an injury while hiding. Federal agents shot and killed the gunman.	Brian Isaack Clyde
July 13, 2019	Shooting and bombing	0 (+1)	0	(Washington (state)) Tacoma, Washington	2019 Tacoma attack: Willem van Spronsen of Vashon attacked an ICE facility with guns and fire bombs, he burned a car and was killed when he attempted to light a propane tank on fire. His friends described him as an anarchist and anti-fascist.	Willem van Spronsen
August 3, 2019	Mass shooting	23	23	El Paso, Texas	2019 El Paso shooting: Patrick Crusius of Allen, Texas, an armed gunman inspired by the Christchurch mosque shootings and beliefs in the Great Replacement conspiracy theory and a supposed "Hispanic invasion of Texas", attacked a Walmart store, killing 23 people and injuring 23 others.	Patrick Crusius
December 6, 2019	Mass shooting	3	8 (+1)	Pensacola, Florida	Naval Air Station Pensacola shooting: A Saudi aviation student killed three U.S. Navy sailors and wounded eight others after opening fire at the Naval Air Station Pensacola. The attack, motivated by a jihadist ideology, was directed by al-Qaeda in the Arabian Peninsula leaders.	al-Qaeda in the Arabian Peninsula
December 10, 2019	Mass shooting	4 (+2)	0	Jersey City, New Jersey	2019 Jersey City shooting: Two people, David Anderson and Francine Graham, members of the Black Hebrew Israelites, killed a police officer in a cemetery. They then attacked a kosher grocery store, killing three. The attack was ended with a prolonged gun battle with police, ending in the death of the two suspects.	David Anderson and Francine Graham
December 28, 2019	Mass stabbing	1	4	(New York (state)) Monsey, New York	2019 Monsey Hanukkah stabbing: A man carrying a machete or a large knife attacked a Hanukkah party injuring 5 before being chased away by the attendees. A 72- year old rabbi would die of his injuries 3 months later. The suspect had written journals espousing antisemitism, referensens to the Nazis and Black Hebrew Israelites. His internet history also included searches about police protection in Jewish neighborhoods in New York City, where "Zionist Temples" and "German Jewish Temples are located and why Hitler hated Jews. He is also under investigation for a stabbing of an Orthodox Jew the month before which caused critical injuries.	Suspect in custody

=== 2020s ===
Date	Type	Dead	Injured	Location(s)	Details	Perpetrator
April 20, 2020	Shooting	0	0	Washington, D.C.	A naturalized American citizen from Cuba fired several shots at the Cuban embassy in the Adams Morgan neighborhood. He also attempted to set a Cuban flag on fire, but failed because it was raining. When police arrested him, he was draped in an American flag. He was also filmed yelling "Shoot me if you want to shoot me. I’m here. I’m American. I’m Yankee." The gunman was found not guilty by insanity and released in 2024.	Alexander Alazo
May 20, 2020	Livestreamed shooting, electrical sabotage, incel terrorism	0	3	Glendale, Arizona	2020 Westgate Entertainment District shooting: An incel-motivated terrorist attack took place in the Westgate Entertainment District, a mixed-use development in Glendale, Arizona. The perpetrator, 20-year-old Armando Hernandez Jr., shot a power transformer causing a local power outage, before opening fire on bystanders, injuring three people. During the attack, Hernandez recorded himself with a cellphone.	Armando Hernandez Jr.
May 21, 2020	Shooting, vehicle ramming	0 (+1)	1	Corpus Christi, Texas	A man drove to an entrance at Naval Air Station Corpus Christi and shot a security guard in the chest, hitting her bulletproof vest. He rammed his vehicle into an entrance gate, then exited and shot at security, who shot and killed him. Investigators said the man had expressed support for ISIS and al-Qaeda online.	Adam Alsahli
May 29, 2020–June 6, 2020	Shooting and bombing	2	3 (+1)	Oakland and Ben Lomond, California	2020 boogaloo killings: Two men, Steven Carrillo and Robert Justus were accused of two "ambush-style" attacks on police. The assailants in the first attack used pipe bombs and homemade guns, killing two. In the second attack assailants were involved in a shootout with police.	Steven Carrillo and Robert Justus
November 28, 2020	Rail sabotage	0	0	(Washington (state)) Bellingham, Washington	Two women, Samantha Brooks and Ellen Reiche carried out several attacks seeking to derail trains in the coastal city of Bellingham. The women were convicted in a federal court of a "shunt" (a device that interferes with train signals) attack, following an FBI Joint Terrorism Task Force investigation into dozens of attempts to derail trains in the area. Since January 19, 2020, there have been at least 41 similar attacks along BNSF tracks in Whatcom and Skagit counties in which shunts have been placed, according to the U.S. Department of Justice.	Samantha Frances Brooks and Ellen Brennan Reiche
January 5, 2021	Attempted bombing	0	0	Washington, D.C.	On the eve of the January 6 attack, a man planted two pipe bombs outside the Democratic National Committee and Republican National Committee offices, respectively. The bombs failed to detonate. A suspect was arrested in December 2025.	Suspect in custody
January 6, 2021	Self-coup, Insurrection	9	174	Washington, D.C.	January 6 United States Capitol attack: On January 6, 2021, the United States Capitol in Washington, D.C., was attacked by a mob of supporters of President Donald Trump in an attempted self-coup, two months after his defeat in the 2020 presidential election. They sought to keep him in power by preventing a joint session of Congress from counting the Electoral College votes to formalize the victory of the president-elect Joe Biden. The attack was unsuccessful in preventing the certification of the election results. According to the bipartisan House select committee that investigated the incident, the attack was the culmination of a plan by Trump to overturn the election. Within 36 hours, five people died: one was shot by the Capitol Police, another died of a drug overdose, and three died of natural causes, including a police officer who died of a stroke a day after being assaulted by rioters and collapsing at the Capitol. (Note: The coroner listed the manner of Sicknick's death as "natural", defined as a term "used when a disease alone causes death. If death is hastened by an injury, the manner of death is not considered natural." The coroner also stated that "All that transpired played a role in his condition". The coroner said there was no "evidence of internal or external injuries".) Many people were injured, including 174 police officers. Four officers who responded to the attack died by suicide within seven months. Damage caused by attackers exceeded $2.7 million.	Supporters of president Donald Trump
April 2, 2021	Vehicle- ramming attack	1 (+1)	1	Washington, D.C.	2021 United States Capitol car attack On April 2, 2021, Noah Green, a 25-year-old black nationalist, killed Capitol Police officer William Evans and wounded a second officer after he deliberately rammed his car into a barricade outside the United States Capitol in Washington, D.C. As a result of the attack, the Capitol complex was locked down. Green was shot and later died at a hospital from the gunshot wounds.	Noah Green
June 6, 2021	Shooting	2 (+1)	0	Winthrop, Massachusetts	A man crashed a stolen vehicle into a building, then shot two Black bystanders from the crowd that gathered nearby. Investigators found white supremacist writings targeting Black people and Jews, and noted that the gunman had passed by several white bystanders without shooting them.	Nathan Allen
August 29, 2021	Shooting	1 (+1)	0	Garland and Plano, Texas	A man called a Lyft rideshare, fatally shot the driver, and stole her car. He drove to the Plano Police Department, where he shot at a police employee and civilian in the lobby. A nearby police officer shot the gunman three times. Investigators said the gunman was inspired by an unspecified foreign terrorist organization.	Imran Ali Rasheed
November 30, 2021	School shooting	4	7	Oxford Township, Michigan	2021 Oxford High School shooting: 15-year-old sophomore Ethan Crumbley was charged with terrorism, 4 counts of murder, and 7 counts of assault with intent to murder after allegedly carrying out a school shooting at Oxford High School. Four days prior to the shooting, Ethan's parents are alleged to have purchased the murder weapon as a gift for him. The day before the shooting, school officials left a voicemail with Ethan's mother notifying her that he had been caught searching for ammunition on his phone, to which she allegedly texted him "LOL I'm not mad at you. You have to learn not to get caught." Earlier on the day of the shooting, Ethan's parents were called to the school after Ethan had drawn a depiction of a shooting. They "resisted the idea" of Ethan leaving the school at the time and did not inform school officials that they had recently purchased a gun for him. He was returned to class because he had no prior disciplinary issues. After he was arrested, investigators found a journal in his home in which Ethan allegedly wrote "Hopefully my shooting will cause Biden to get impeached". Ethan's parents were both charged with 4 counts of involuntary manslaughter. They failed to appear for their arraignment, but were arrested the following day after an extensive manhunt.	Ethan Crumbley
January 15, 2022	Hostage-taking	0 (+1)	0	Colleyville, Texas	Colleyville synagogue hostage crisis: 44-year-old gunman Malik Faisal Akram, a British citizen from suburban Manchester, breached the Congregation Beth Israel synagogue and then took four people hostage in Colleyville, Texas, United States. The incident took place during Sabbath services. After a ten-hour standoff and hostage negotiations, an FBI Hostage Rescue Team entered the synagogue; Akram died after from a gunshot wound during rescue operations. The remaining hostages were recovered unharmed.	Malik Faisal Akram
April 12, 2022	Mass shooting, Smoke grenade attack	0	29	(New York (state)) New York City, New York	2022 New York Subway attack: 62-year old Frank Robert James threw smoke grenades and started firing his handguns during a train ride in the New York Subway injuring 10 people by gunfire while another 19 were injured by smoke inhalation or other causes.He had made numerous videos expressing Black supremacy and other extremist views. James later blamed the attack on his mental health and perceived racism he's a victim of saying in court "I am Black and African American and that's the reason i'm sitting in front of you today".	Frank Robert James
May 14, 2022	Mass shooting	10	3	(New York (state)) Buffalo, New York	2022 Buffalo shooting: 18-year-old gunman Payton S. Gendron, a self-described white supremacist and neo-Nazi, reportedly drove hours from his home in Conklin to a Tops Supermarket in Buffalo. Wearing body armor (including a helmet with a camera livestreaming the incident on Twitch), he then left his vehicle and shot four people in the parking lot before entering the store to shoot nine more victims, including a security guard. He was holding a gun to his neck when police arrived, but was arrested after being talked into dropping the gun and surrendering. The perpetrator released a manifesto online that cited Christchurch mosque shootings perpetrator Brenton Tarrant as an influence.	Payton S. Gendron
May 15, 2022	Mass shooting	1	5	Laguna Woods, California	2022 Laguna Woods shooting: On May 15, 2022, David Wenwei Chou, a 68-year-old man, entered a Taiwanese church congregation in Laguna Woods, California. He opened fire, killing one person, Dr. John Cheng, and injuring five others during a luncheon. Attendees managed to restrain him, and local police subsequently arrested him. The shooting was believed to be politically motivated due to tensions between China and Taiwan.	David Chou
May 25, 2022	Arson	0	0	Casper, Wyoming	A woman set the Wellspring Health Access clinic on fire. The clinic was being renovated to accommodate an abortion clinic, the only one in Wyoming. The woman told investigators that she was opposed to abortion; she was sentenced to five years in prison.	Lorna Green
August 11, 2022	Attempted break-in	0 (+1)	0	Cincinnati, Ohio	A man attempted to enter the FBI field office in Cincinnati armed with a handgun, nail gun, and wearing body armor. Police pursued the man to nearby Wilmington, where he was shot and killed by a state trooper. The Department of Homeland Security said that prior to the incident the man had called for others to arm themselves and kill federal officers.	Ricky Shiffer
August 12, 2022	Attempted assassination, stabbing	0	2	(New York (state)) Chautauqua, New York	Stabbing of Salman Rushdie: A man attempted to stab author Salman Rushdie as he was about to give a public lecture at the Chautauqua Institute, resulting in him losing the use of an eye and one hand. His interviewer was also injured. The attacker was charged with the attempted murder of Rushdie and supporting terrorism. Rushdie wrote the memoir Knife: Meditations After an Attempted Murder after the attack.	Hadi Matar
October 28, 2022	Physical assault	0	1	San Francisco, California	Attack on Paul Pelosi: On October 28, 2022, 42-year-old David DePape attacked Paul Pelosi, the husband of Nancy Pelosi, the 52nd Speaker of the United States House of Representatives. DePape beat Paul with a hammer during a home invasion of the couple's Pacific Heights, San Francisco residence, leaving him with a fractured skull that required surgery.	David DePape
November 7, 2022	Bombing	0	0	San Antonio, Texas	An attorney from Panama City, Florida drove to San Antonio and detonated two canisters of explosive materials at the base of a sculpture titled "Miss Mao Trying to Poise Herself at the Top of Lenin's Head", damaging it. Though the sculpture was satirical and made fun of Mao Zedong, the attorney was motivated by opposition to the Chinese government, blaming them for the COVID-19 pandemic.	Christopher Rodriguez
November 19, 2022–November 20, 2022	Mass shooting	5	26	Colorado Springs, Colorado	2022 Colorado Springs nightclub shooting: A 22-year-old man opened fire at Club Q, a gay bar, killing five people and wounding 26, 19 by gunfire. After being subdued by bystanders, the man was arrested by police. He was convicted of murder and sentenced to life in prison.	Anderson Lee Aldrich
December 4, 2022–January 3, 2023	Shootings	0	0	Albuquerque, New Mexico	After losing his election bid, Solomon Peña hired men to shoot at the homes of four Democratic politicians in Albuquerque. In one instance, a shooter fired three bullets through the bedroom of State Senator Linda M. Lopez's daughter as she slept. One of the shooters told police that Peña instructed the shooters to aim lower when they intended to fire above windows.	Solomon Peña
December 31, 2022	Machete attack	0	3 (+1)	(New York (state)) New York City, New York	A 19-year-old Maine man attacked three NYPD officers with a machete in Times Square during New Year's festivities, leaving one with a fractured skull. One of the officers shot the man in the shoulder. The man yelled "allahu akbar" during the attack and said he attacked the officers to wage jihad. He was sentenced to 27 years in prison.	Trevor Bickford
January 15, 2023	Arson	0	0	Peoria, Illinois	A man used a homemade explosive to set a fire at a Planned Parenthood clinic days after Governor JB Pritzker signed a bill extending abortion protections in the state. The man told investigators he set the fire in response to his girlfriend getting an abortion years prior, though the woman told the FBI that this was incorrect and she had not had an abortion.	Tyler Massengill
February 15, 2023–February 16, 2023	Hate crime, shootings	0	2	Los Angeles, California	Over the course of two days, a man shot two Jewish men in the Pico-Robertson neighborhood, both of whom were leaving synagogue services and wearing yarmulkes. The man was arrested on February 17 after a witness reported seeing him firing a gun behind a motel. According to authorities, the man had a documented history of antisemitic views, including social media accounts with the handle "k1llalljews". He was sentenced to 35 years in prison.	Jaime Tran
May 6, 2023	Mass shooting	8 (+1)	7	Allen, Texas	2023 Allen, Texas mall shooting: A white supremacist and neo-Nazi opened fire at an outdoor mall, killing eight people, before being killed by a police officer. The shooter had expressed white supremacist and other extremist ideologies and had made posts with anti-Arab and anti-Asian remarks; four of the victims were of Asian descent.	Mauricio Garcia
May 20, 2023	Arson, vehicle-ramming attack	0	0	Danville, Illinois	A man drove a car into a building that was planned to be used as an abortion clinic. The man had brought bottles of gasoline to set the building on fire, but he became trapped in his vehicle after the initial crash. He was sentenced to ten years in prison.	Philip Buyno
May 22, 2023	Vehicle-ramming attack	0	0	Washington, D.C.	2023 Lafayette Square U-Haul crash: A 19-year-old Indian national rented a U-Haul truck and drove it into the barriers around the north side of Lafayette Square. After crashing, he exited the truck and unfurled a Nazi flag. Prosecutors said the man wished to replace the American government with a Nazi-style dictatorship.	Sai Varshith Kandula
August 26, 2023	Mass shooting	3 (+1)	0	Jacksonville, Florida	2023 Jacksonville shooting: 21-year gunman Ryan Christopher Palmeter, an anti-black shooter, drove from Edward Waters University to a Dollar General store in Jacksonville. Wearing body armor, he left his vehicle and shot three people before committing suicide and leaving behind three manifestos.	Ryan Christopher Palmeter
September 24, 2023	Attempted firebombing	0	0	Washington, D.C.	Two Molotov cocktails were thrown at the Cuban embassy. There was no significant damage. No suspects were arrested.	Unknown
September 25, 2023	Attempted bombing	0	0	Washington, D.C.	An attorney from Panama City, Florida drove to Washington, D.C. and attempted to detonate a bag of explosive materials outside of the Chinese embassy sometime from 12–3 in the morning. He tried to shoot the canisters with a rifle, but missed. The attorney was reportedly motivated by distrust of the Chinese government; he blamed China for the COVID-19 pandemic and the COVID-19 vaccine for his father's death.	Christopher Rodriguez
October 9, 2023	Vehicle-ramming	0 (+1)	0	San Francisco, California	A Chinese citizen drove through the front entrance of the Chinese consulate in San Francisco. A security guard told police the man yelled "I’m against the CCP!" and "I’m looking for the big guy in the consulate!" He was shot and killed by police who arrived at the scene. Police found a crossbow and knife in his car.	Zhanyuan Yang
November 20, 2023	Mass shooting	0 (+1)	4	Beavercreek, Ohio	A man with a rifle opened fire inside a Walmart, injuring four people, before killing himself. The FBI said the gunman was partially motivated by "racially or ethnically motivated violent" ideologies; two of the injured were Black, and the other two were white.	Benjamin Charles Jones
January 30, 2024	Murder, decapitation, Break in	1	0	Levittown, Pennsylvania	A man shot and killed his father before beheading his corpse and showing of the head in a video he uploaded to YouTube in order to intimidate federal employees and get them to follow his demands. In it he called his father a federal employee and a traitor as well as making political rants about numerous topics. He was arrested after climbing over the fence to the states National Guard headquarters and trying to call on others to try overthrow the government of the US with him.	Justin Mohn
February 24, 2024	Bombing	0	0	Montgomery, Alabama	A man set off a bomb outside the office of Alabama Attorney General Steve Marshall. Prior to the bombing, the man posted several stickers on nearby buildings, including ones showing support for antifa. He was sentenced to nine years in prison.	Kyle Calvert
April 8, 2024	Bombing	0	0	Salem, Massachusetts	An Oklahoma man left a pipe bomb at the main entrance of The Satanic Temple. The explosive failed to detonate and caused minor exterior damage to the building. The man left a note directed at Satanists nearby; he was sentenced to five years in prison.	Sean Patrick Palmer
May 1, 2024	Arson	0	0	Portland, Oregon	15 police cars were set on fire at a Portland Police Bureau training facility. An anarchist group called "Rachel Corrie's Ghost Brigade" claimed responsibility, saying they burned the cars to prevent them from being used to sweep protesters occupying the library at Portland State University.	Rachel Corrie's Ghost Brigade
June 1, 2024–June 16, 2024	Arson, firebombings	0	0	Berkeley and Oakland, California	A man set several fires at several locations on the University of California, Berkeley campus and a federal building in Oakland. On June 1, the man put several Molotov cocktails under a campus police vehicle at UC Berkeley and lit them, setting the car on fire. On June 11, he attempted to break a window at the Ronald V. Dellums Federal Building in Oakland and throw Molotovs inside, but he fled after Federal Protective Service officers confronted him, instead putting the Molotovs in a planter on the side of the building. He also set fires at UC Berkeley on June 13 and 16. The man told authorities that he was inspired by the October 7 attacks by Hamas and that he hoped to inspire others to attack property at other Bay Area colleges.	Casey Robert Goonan
July 3, 2024-July 4, 2024	Hostage-taking, Attempted mass shooting, Shootout	0 (+1)	1	Yellowstone National Park, Wyoming	A man took a women hostage during the night and allegedly threatened to carry out a mass shooting, made racist remarks as well saying he wanted to make a something big and a statement regarding politics in America. He had many times before espoused antisemitism and White supremacy. He had also said that he would "go postal" if he stayed at the park longer and complained that the park was becoming non-white, calling it a "hellscape". Early next morning, he got into a shootout with Park rangers, who were there because of the woman's warning, while he began to shoot at a crowded dinner facility and killed by return fire after having wounded one in the foot. Federal officials said he planned an act of pro White nationalist violence and terrorism against the US as well as having prepared a getaway car with weapons and ammunition inside.	Samson Lucas Bariah Fussner
July 13, 2024	Assassination, mass shooting	2 (+1)	6	Butler, Pennsylvania	Attempted assassination of Donald Trump in Pennsylvania: while speaking at an open-air campaign rally near Butler, Pennsylvania. Trump was shot and wounded in his upper right ear by 20-year-old Thomas Matthew Crooks, who fired eight rounds from an AR-15–style rifle from the roof of a nearby building. Crooks also killed one audience member, firefighter Corey Comperatore, and critically injured two others with one of them dying from complications from his injuries in 2026. Four seconds after Crooks began firing, Aaron Zaliponi, a member of the Butler County Emergency Service Unit, shot at him and hit his rifle, preventing him from firing more shots. Twelve seconds later, Crooks was shot and killed by the Counter Sniper Team of the United States Secret Service.	Thomas Crooks
September 15, 2024	Assassination	0	1	West Palm Beach, Florida	Attempted assassination of Donald Trump in Florida: Donald Trump, then a former president of the United States and nominee of the Republican Party in the 2024 presidential election, survived an alleged assassination attempt while golfing at Trump International Golf Club in West Palm Beach, Florida. A suspect, later identified as 58-year-old Ryan Wesley Routh, was spotted hiding in nearby shrubbery while aiming a rifle at a member of Trump's security detail. A Secret Service agent fired upon Routh, who fled the scene and was later captured in Martin County.	Ryan Routh
September 25, 2024	Bombing	0	5	Santa Maria, California	A bag with a bomb inside it was thrown into a Santa Barbara County courthouse, injuring five people in the explosion. A 20-year-old man was arrested. According to a federal complaint, the suspect told witnesses that the government had taken his guns and that they needed to rebel against the government.	Suspect in custody
October 26, 2024	Shooting, Shootout	0	1 (+1)	Chicago, Illinois	An immigrant from Mauritania was accused of shooting and injuring a Jewish man heading to a synagogue before shooting from differing locations at police officers and paramedics responding to the attack. It ended when he was hit by return fire and wounded. Evidentiary material from his phone implied that he was deliberately targeting people of Jewish faith. The suspect faced hate crime and terrorism charges but died in an apparent suicide in detention on December 1 before his trial.	Suspect deceased (apparent suicide in detention before trail)
December 4, 2024	School shooting	0 (+1)	2	Oroville, California	2024 Feather River School shooting: 56-year old Glenn Litton shot and critically injured two kindergartners at a school of the Christian denomination Seventh-Day Adventist Church before killing himself after bluffing to the school about enrolling a grandson that didn't exits as to be able to get access to school grounds. He had also arranged an appointment at another one of the churches schools two days later. He described in writing the shooting as "child executions" being "imposed" against the school as a reaction to" America's involvement in genocide and oppression of Palestinians" as well as attacks in Yemen.	Glenn Litton
December 16, 2024	School shooting, mass shooting	2 (+1)	6	Madison, Wisconsin	2024 Abundant Life Christian School shooting: A 15-year-old high school student opened fire during a study hall, killing two people and injuring six before killing herself. The shooter had frequently posted neo-Nazi imagery, and the Institute for Strategic Dialogue described the shooting as an example of nihilistic violent extremism.	Natalie "Samantha" Rupnow
January 1, 2025	Vehicle-ramming attack, shootout	14 (+1)	36	New Orleans, Louisiana	2025 New Orleans truck attack: Shamsud-Din Jabbar drove a truck into a crowd of people on Bourbon Street and Canal Street. He then got out of the truck and shot at the police. The Police further found more guns, a bomb, and an ISIS flag in the truck.	Shamsud-Din Jabbar
January 1, 2025	Truck bomb	0 (+1)	7	Paradise, Nevada	2025 Las Vegas Cybertruck explosion: A 37-year-old man parked a rented Tesla Cybertruck loaded with fireworks outside the main entrance of the Trump International Hotel Las Vegas before shooting himself in the head and detonating them, killing himself and injuring seven others.	Matthew Livelsberger
January 2025–April 2025	Arson, vandalism	0	0	United States	2025 Tesla vandalism: Across the United States, a number of Tesla vehicles were vandalized. Vehicles were set on fire in Las Vegas, Kansas City, Missouri, Bernalillo, New Mexico, and Seattle.	Various
January 22, 2025	School shooting	1 (+1)	2	Nashville, Tennessee	2025 Antioch High School shooting: A student at Antioch High School opened fire in the school cafeteria, killing a classmate, before killing himself. The shooter was affiliated with various extremist groups, two of which he mentioned in a recording.	Solomon Henderson
January 15, 2025	Shooting	0	2	Miami Beach, Florida	A man was arrested for shooting two Israeli tourists in a car. After being arrested, the suspect told police he shot the men because he believed they were Palestinian.	Suspect in custody
March 30, 2025	Arson	0	0	Albuquerque, New Mexico	The front entrance of the New Mexico Republican Party headquarters were set on fire. A suspect was arrested, who was also charged with setting a fire at a Tesla dealership.	Suspect in custody
April 13, 2025	Arson	0	0	Harrisburg, Pennsylvania	2025 Pennsylvania Governor's Residence arson: A 38-year-old set governor Josh Shapiro's residence on fire with Molotov cocktails while he and his family slept inside. The perpetrator was charged with terrorism, attempted murder, aggravated arson, and aggravated assault after he turned himself into the police.	Cody Balmer
May 17, 2025	Car bomb	0 (+1)	4	Palm Springs, California	2025 Palm Springs fertility clinic bombing: A car bomb detonated at the entrance of a fertility clinic in Palm Springs, California, killing one person and injuring four others. One suspect was killed in the blast, while the other was arrested but later committed suicide while in custody.	Guy Edward Barktus
May 21, 2025	Shooting	2	0	(Washington, D.C.) Washington D.C.	2025 Capital Jewish Museum shooting: Two Israeli Embassy staff members were shot and killed as they left an event at the Capital Jewish Museum. A 31-year-old man was arrested at the scene; witnesses said he shouted "Free Palestine" and "I did this for Gaza".	Suspect in custody
June 1, 2025	Firebombing	1	14 (+1)	Boulder, Colorado	2025 Boulder fire attack: On June 1, 2025, Mohamed Sabry Soliman, a male Egyptian living in Colorado, allegedly used a makeshift flamethrower and Molotov cocktails to attack a group participating in a solidarity walk for hostages taken from Israel during the October 7 attacks, leaving fifteen people injured, including the suspect. One other person was reported to be injured, but ended up dying from their injuries weeks later.	Mohamed Sabry Soliman
June 14, 2025	Assassination, Shooting, Shootout	2	2	Brooklyn Park and Champlin, Minnesota	Shootings of Minnesota legislators: Vance Boelter, targeting state legislators belonging to the Democratic Party, shoots and injures Sen.John Hoffman and his wife and kills House speaker Melissa Hortman and her husband in separate targeted attacks, as well as becoming engaged in a shootout with police at Hortman's house. He also stopped at the houses of two other legislators. Boetler was captured the day later after a manhunt.	Vance Boelter
July 4, 2025	Shooting	0	1	Alvarado, Texas	2025 Prairieland ICE detention center incident: A group of protesters set off fireworks and vandalized vehicles outside Prairieland Detention Center. When a police officer arrived, one of the 11 protesters, Benjamin Song, fired three shots at him. In total, 22 people were arrested, including some who had left prior to the shooting and some who were not present at the protest. Several of those convicted received maximum sentences of decades in prison.	Benjamin Song (shooting)
July 7, 2025	Shooting	0 (+1)	3	McAllen, Texas	A man carrying tactical gear and a mask while holding an AR-15 style rifle got into a shootout in the parking lot of a Border Patrol facility before he tried to enter it, shooting several dozens of shots in to the building and at agents and officers within and outside it before being killed by return fire. Two officers and one border patrol employee were injured in the shooting with one of them shot in the knee while no federal officers were hurt. The perpetrator, who his brother said had started encountering mental health issues the year before as he became "obsessed with the news", was reported missing from his home hours before after an argument with his father. Inside his car he had more arms and ammunition and had also written with spray paint "Cordis Die", which is the name of a revolutionary group in the video game Call of Duty: Black Ops II intending to incapacitate capitalist governments. US Border tsar, Tom Homan, blamed the attack on hateful rhetoric against ICE and border patrol.	Ryan Lewis Mosqueda
July 27, 2025	Mass stabbing	0	11	Traverse City, Michigan	2025 Traverse City stabbing attack: On July 26, 2025, a mass stabbing was committed inside a Walmart store in Garfield Township, near Traverse City, Michigan, United States. Eleven people were injured, some with life-threatening injuries. Several bystanders helped in stopping the suspect, including Marine veteran Derrick Perry, who held the attacker at gunpoint with a handgun before another Marine veteran, Matthew Kolakowski, tackled him to the ground.	Suspect in custody
August 8, 2025	Shooting	1 (+1)	0	(Georgia (U.S. state)) Atlanta, Georgia	A man attempted to enter the Center for Disease Control offices in Atlanta. After being denied entry, the man barricaded himself on the second floor of a CVS Pharmacy across the street and shot at the building with a rifle, damaging 150 windows. He also shot and killed a responding police officer before killing himself. The gunman was motivated by a distrust of COVID-19 vaccines.	Patrick Joseph White
August 27, 2025	School shooting	2 (+1)	17	Minneapolis, Minnesota	Annunciation Catholic Church shooting: On August 27, 2025, a school shooting was committed in a Catholic Church where 2 children were killed and 17 other people were injured before the perpetrator committed suicide. The perpetrator was a 23-year-old trans woman who used antisemitic, anti-Catholic, and racist phrases in YouTube videos plus wrote "kill Donald Trump" and "6 million wasn't enough" on her weapons.	Robin Westman
September 10, 2025	School shooting	0 (+1)	2	Evergreen, Colorado	2025 Evergreen High School shooting: A high school student shot two classmates at his high school before killing himself. The shooter had expressed neo-Nazi views and interest in previous mass shootings in the months leading up to the attack.	Desmond Holly
September 24, 2025	Shooting	2 (+1)	1	Dallas, Texas	2025 Dallas ICE facility shooting: A man fired at an ICE facility from a nearby rooftop, hitting three detainees in an ICE vehicle, before killing himself. Writings by the shooter indicated he was targeting ICE employees.	Joshua Jahn
September 28, 2025	Mass shooting, arson, vehicle-ramming	4 (+1)	8	Grand Blanc Township, Michigan	2025 Grand Blanc Township church attack: A man drove a pickup truck into a Latter-day Saint meetinghouse and opened fire before setting the building on fire. Two people were killed and five injured by gunfire, and two were killed and three injured by the arson. The shooter was killed by police. The shooter had expressed hatred towards the LDS Church.	Thomas Jacob Sanford
November 26, 2025	Shooting	1	1 (+1)	(Washington, D.C.) Washington D.C.	2025 Washington, D.C., National Guard shooting: Two members of the West Virginia National Guard were shot near the Farragut West station. An Afghan national was arrested.	Suspect in custody
December 1, 2025	Attempted firebombing	0	0	Los Angeles, California	A man threw two Molotov cocktails at an employee entrance of a federal building in Downtown Los Angeles. Prior to this, he also set his Koreatown apartment on fire. The building houses the Los Angeles offices of the Department of Homeland Security, and the man yelled "this is a terrorist attack anyways, you're separating families" during the attack.	Jose Francisco Jovel
January 10, 2026	Arson	0	0 (+1)	Jackson, Mississippi	The Beth Israel Congregation synagogue was set on fire in the early morning. A suspect was arrested; he was found with burn marks on his hands. The suspect allegedly called Beth Israel a "synagogue of Satan" and said he set it on fire because of its "Jewish ties".	Suspect in custody
February 19, 2026	Vehicle-ramming	0 (+1)	0	Boulder City, Nevada	A 23-year old man drove from Albany, New York and rammed his rented car into a Nevada power substation before shooting himself. Investigators found that he owned books relating to various different extremist ideologies across the spectrum in addition to explosive making material and components. He messaged his family members saying he was feeling obliged to do the attack which he said would land him "on the news" and called himself a "dead terrorist son". Multiple weapons in addition to other items and materials that could be cause and be used for damage were found in his vehicle.	Dawson Maloney
March 1, 2026	Mass shooting	3 (+1)	15	Austin, Texas	2026 Austin bar shooting: A 53-year-old man fired at people outside the Buford's Backyard Beer Garden in downtown Austin, killing three people, before being killed by police. The FBI investigated the shooting as a terrorist act motivated by the 2026 Iran war.	Ndiaga Diagne
March 7, 2026	Attempted bombing	0	0	(New York (state)) New York City, New York	2026 New York City protest bombing attempt: During a protest held by far-right activist Jake Lang, two men threw improvised devices at the crowd, which failed to detonate. The two men, both from Pennsylvania, were arrested at the scene. Authorities said the attack was inspired by ISIS.	Suspects in custody
March 12, 2026	Shooting, vehicle-ramming attack	0 (+1)	64	West Bloomfield Township, Michigan	2026 Temple Israel attack: A man drove a truck through the front of Temple Israel, hitting a security officer. The truck caught fire, resulting in damage to the building and 63 first responders being treated for smoke inhalation. After exchanging gunfire with security, the man killed himself in his truck. The attack was in retaliation an Israeli airstrike that killed several of his family members in Lebanon. The FBI said the attacker was inspired by Hezbollah.	Ayman Mohamed Ghazali
March 13, 2026	School shooting	1 (+1)	2	Norfolk, Virginia	2026 Old Dominion University shooting: A man entered an ROTC class at Old Dominion University and opened fire, killing the instructor and injuring two cadets. A cadet armed with a pocket-knife fatally stabbed the gunman. The shooter had previously been convicted of supporting ISIS and was not allowed to own firearms.	Mohamed Bailor Jalloh
April 25, 2026	Attempted assassination, shooting	0	1 (+1)	(Washington, D.C.) Washington D.C.	2026 White House Correspondents' Dinner shooting: A man was accused of shooting a Secret Service agent in his bulletproof vest before being subdued and injured during the yearly White House Correspondents' Dinner. The suspect had allegedly written a manifesto saying he intend to target the president and his cabinet.	Suspect in custody
May 18, 2026	Shooting	3 (+2)	1	San Diego, California	2026 Islamic Center of San Diego shooting: Two teenagers shot at people outside the Islamic Center of San Diego, killing a security guard and two others, before committing suicide in their vehicle nearby. The shooters had a manifesto in which they expressed hatred towards Muslims, Jews, women, gay people, transgender people, and Hispanic people. The FBI said the shootings were motivated by "nihilistic violent extremism". A teenager from North Carolina was also charged with assisting the shooters by publishing their manifesto.	Cain Lee Clark and Caleb Liam Vasquez
June 25, 2026–July 8, 2026	Firebombings	0	0	(New York (state)) New York City, New York	A man was charged with several firebombings across several days. According to authorities, the man first firebombed a smoke shop in Brooklyn on June 25. On July 8, the same suspect is accused of bombing a church in Ozone Park, a Jehovah's Witness Hall in Woodhaven, and an ambulette company in Cypress Hills. Investigators said the suspect he told them he committed the bombings because "They're Muslims, scum and terrorists". Prosecutors also said that, prior to the church bombing, he asked a witness "Do you want this institution to be turned into a mosque?"	Suspect in custody
July 13, 2026	Stabbing	0	1	West Valley City, Utah	A man entered the Valley Fair Mall and asked a kiosk employee if he was Muslim. When the employee affirmed this, the other man stabbed him. After being arrested, the attacker told police he wanted to decapitate the victim, eat his heart, and kill other Muslims in the mall.	Suspect in custody
July 23, 2026	Stabbing	0	2	(New York (state)) New York City, New York	A man stabbed two people in the Upper West Side in separate attacks. The first victim was Asian and the second was Jewish, and witnesses said the attacker yelled "Allahu akbar" during both stabbings. The suspect was charged with hate crimes.	Suspect in custody
August 31, 2026	Shooting	2 (+1)	0	Tucson, Arizona	A man shot and killed two men outside of a gay bar before killing himself. The gunman had a list of other LGBTQ businesses on his person, and another note in his apartment said that he was targeting gay people.	Ousman Ceesay
September 8, 2026	Chemical terrorism	0	7+ (+1)	Portland, Oregon	A 15-year-old student at Benson Polytechnic High School was arrested for mixing hazardous chemicals in the cafeteria. He passed out from chemical exposure and was hospitalized. Seven staff members were also treated for exposure, and several students reported headaches and difficulty breathing. The student was charged with attempted murder and domestic terrorism, with the district attorney saying he had "homicidal and harmful tendencies" and had nihilist ideas.	Suspect in custody
October 11, 2026	Attempted shooting	0	0	Aurora, Illinois	A 19-year-old man allegedly attempted to commit a mass shooting at the Sri Venkateswara Swami (Balaji) Temple in Aurora. According to authorities, the suspect, a white supremacist, attempted to shoot people of Indian descent at the temple but failed when his rifle jammed. He was arrested after returning home and calling a co-worker to tell him about the plot; the co-worker called police. Representative Raja Krishnamoorthi and his family were at the temple at the time of the attempted shooting.	Suspect in custody
October 18, 2026	Firebombing	0	0	(Georgia (U.S. state)) Atlanta, Georgia	A man was charged with throwing a Molotov cocktail at an Immigration and Customs Enforcement building in downtown Atlanta.	Suspect in custody

== See also ==
- Attacks on the United States
