= Shumpert =

Shumpert is a surname. Notable people with the surname include:

- Don Shumpert (born 1992), American football coach
- Iman Shumpert (born 1990), American basketball player
- Mert Shumpert (born 1979), American-Turkish basketball player
- Ruben Shumpert, accomplice of Ali Muhammad Brown in a bank fraud crime, later enrolled by the jihadist group Al-Shabaab in Somalia
- Terry Shumpert (born 1966), American baseball player

== In fiction ==
- Holly Shumpert, a fictional character of the American sitcom The King of Queens, ran on CBS from 1998 to 2007
- Shumpert, a Woodbury survivor and The Governor's crossbow-bearing henchman in the fictional TV series, The Walking Dead
