= 1997 Brooklyn bombing plot =

Police raid in New York City

- Location: 40°40′36.1″N 73°59′1.8″W; Park Slope, Brooklyn, New York City, United States
- Date: July 31, 1997; 4:40 am
- Attack type: Police raid due to planned suicide pipe bombings
- Deaths: 0
- Injuries: 3 (the police officer and both suspects)
- Perpetrator: Gazi Ibrahim Abu Mezer

On July 31, 1997, officers from the NYPD Emergency Service Unit raided an apartment in Brooklyn, New York City, after being warned of a planned bombing. Gazi Ibrahim Abu Mezer and Lafi Khalil, both were shot and apprehended during the raid, which located two pipe bombs in the apartment.

Mezer, who confessed to having planned to bomb a train on the New York City Subway, received a life sentence for the plot which included charges of conspiring to use a weapon of mass destruction, while Khalil was acquitted for charges related to the bombing plot and sentenced to three years in prison for immigration fraud.

== Raid and prosecution ==
Two days before the police raid, on July 29, the United States Department of State received a letter that threatened a series of bombings throughout New York City unless Islamic militants including Omar Abdel-Rahman, Ahmed Yassin and Ramzi Yousef were released from prison. On July 30, Abdelrahman Mosabbah approached the NYPD and the FBI, warning of bombings being planned in his apartment by two roommates. According to Mosabbah, his roommates wanted "to follow up on Jerusalem," a reference to the double-suicide bombing of the Mahane Yehuda Market the same day. At 4:40 a.m., July 31, NYPD officers raided the apartment; one officer was assaulted by Mezer attempting to detonate a bomb, following which both Mezer and Khalil were shot and rushed to hospital.

In the raid, police found two pipe bombs, made with black powder and filled with nails for shrapnel, as well as a draft of the letter sent to the State Department and detailed plans indicating a plot to bomb a commuter bus and the Atlantic Avenue subway station. The bombs having toggle switches and lacking any timers or remote detonating devices suggested that suicide bombings had been planned. Anti-Semitic material was also found in the apartment, and Mezer later claimed that he wanted to "martyr" himself and kill "as many Jews as I could take." According to a local Nigerian shop owner, the men were Muslims who "drove cars with bumper stickers saying 'I love the Koran'," and who "talked about Islam a lot." Their apartment block was described by The New York Times as a "dilapidated two-story house on the semi-industrial fringes of Park Slope," wherein the suspects went "unnoticed in a shabby neighborhood where recent immigrants from the third world crowd many to a room." About 100 residents of the local apartment blocks were evacuated following the discovery of the bombs, and the subway system was temporarily interrupted forcing thousands of people to take buses.

On August 20, Mezer and Khalil were indicted for four criminal counts, namely "conspiring to use a weapon of mass destruction, intentional use and carry of a firearm, knowingly and intentionally conspiring to use and carry a firearm, and intentionally possessing/obtaining a counterfeit alien registration receipt card." Mezer confessed to the plot, claiming the bombing had been planned for 8:00 a.m., being thwarted by the police raid just hours away. On July 23, 1998 Mezer was sentenced to life, while Khalil was acquitted for the plot, receiving a 120-month maximum prison term for forged immigration documents. When the verdict was announced, Mezer jumped to his feet while waving a Quran in his hand and shouting "Allahu akbar".

== Aftermath ==
The incident received particular attention due to the fact that Mezer had entered the United States illegally through the northern border from Canada, even after having been caught by border patrol agents several times. A special investigation was released by the Office of Inspector General in March 1998 entitled "Bombs in Brooklyn, How the Two Illegal Aliens Arrested for Plotting to Bomb the New York Subway Entered and Remained in the United States." The case was later also mentioned in the 9/11 Commission Report released in July 2004.

After Canada refused to take back Abu Mezer he was paroled into the United States in June 1996 because of a lack of detention space along the northern border. One expert noted that by releasing him into the country, "the INS effectively made the northern border meaningless. That is, being captured on the border produced exactly the same result as if he had successfully slipped across the border undetected."
