= Ali Muhammad Brown =

American mass murderer

- Born: 1985 (age 40–41)
- Allegiance: al-Shabaab (suspected)
- Motive: Retaliation for US foreign policy towards Muslim nations
- Criminal charges: 2005: Bank fraud; 2012: Communication with a minor for immoral purposes; 2014: First-degree murder, terrorism

Details
- Date: April 27 - June 25, 2014
- Locations: Seattle, Washington and West Orange, New Jersey
- Target: American civilians
- Killed: 4
- Weapon: 9mm pistol
- Date apprehended: July 18, 2014
- Imprisoned at: New Jersey State Prison

Ali Muhammad Brown (born 1985) is a convicted murderer in a 2014 murder spree. Brown has confessed and pleaded guilty to killing Ahmed Said, Dwone Anderson-Young, and Leroy Henderson in Seattle and 19-year-old college student Brendan Tevlin in West Orange, New Jersey, between April and June 2014. Brown was previously convicted of bank fraud and "communication with a minor for immoral purposes".

After his arrest, Brown told investigators that he is guided strictly by his faith, and that the killings were "just" because they were in retaliation for actions by the U.S. government in Iraq, Syria and Afghanistan.

== Timeline ==
Brown was born in the United States, and he has family in New Jersey.

From January 2002 to November 2004, Brown with three accomplices defrauded the Bank of America, Washington Mutual, Wells Fargo, and other banks out of large sums of money. The group was led by barber shop owner Ruben Shumpert, who later fled to Somalia, where he died fighting for Al-Shabaab. The check kiting scam involved depositing bad checks, and then withdrawing cash before the checks were returned. Authorities believed that the effort was to fund militant Islamist terrorist groups in Somalia, but were unable to prove the link. In 2005, Brown pleaded guilty to using stolen information to forge checks as part of a fraud ring and was sentenced to probation.

In March 2012, Brown pleaded guilty to "communication with a minor for immoral purposes" and served a year in prison.

On April 27, 2014, Leroy Henderson was walking home from a store in the Seattle suburb of Skyway when he was shot 10 times and killed by a man later identified as Brown in a drive-by shooting in his girlfriend's Dodge Durango.

On June 1, Ahmed Said, 27, and Dwone Anderson-Young, 23, were murdered execution-style shortly after midnight in the Leschi neighborhood of Seattle shortly after they left a gay nightclub. Both victims were gay, Ahmed Said was apparently lured by being contacted on Grindr, a hookup app for gay and bisexual men. The case was soon investigated as a possible hate crime. They were shot multiple times in Said's car and the suspect left a bloody palm print behind, along with distinctive 9mm casings.

On June 25, 2014, 19-year-old college student Brendan Tevlin was returning from a friend's house in a Jeep Liberty to his home when he was approached by three men at an intersection in West Orange, New Jersey. While Eric Williams, 18, stayed in his car, Brown and Jeremy Villagran, 19, surrounded Tevlin's car as Brown opened fire into the closed passenger window 10 times and striking Tevlin eight times. Brown pushed the body onto the passenger seat floor and drove to an apartment complex about a mile away, and stole some personal items.

Four days later, Brown is believed to have tried to steal a car from a man at gunpoint, but did not know how to drive a stick shift, so he fled. At a nearby convenience store, he changed clothes, and is seen with his head and face on a security video covered by a checkered keffiyeh head scarf. On July 18, the fugitive was arrested in New Jersey, found camping in the woods in a lean-to shelter. With him was a notebook on how to carry on warfare and evade authorities. Brown and 3 others pleaded not guilty to the murders of Tevlin and recent high school graduate and cheerleader Cheyanne Bond in Newark on August 6. Brown was later cleared of the murder of Bond, who was murdered in an unrelated armed robbery.

By August 20, 2014, Brown had been charged with three counts of aggravated murder in the 1st degree, each of which occurred in the Seattle metropolitan area, including a slaying in Skyway. Brown also committed a fourth murder in West Orange (Essex County), New Jersey, on June 14, 2014. A murder indictment on the New Jersey count was expected sometime in April or May, 2015. As of July 2015, Brown was charged with terrorism.

In November 2016, he was convicted of armed robbery and weapons charges and was sentenced to 36 1/2 years in prison.

On March 6, 2018, Brown was convicted in Essex County Court on many charges. He was sentenced to life without parole for his crimes.

In 2022, Brown was extradited to Washington state and for his crimes there. On September 9, 2023, he was sentenced to 93 years in prison.

== Motive ==
Brown is a convert to Islam and a jihadi who defended his actions as being "just kills", or justified shootings, of adult men in retaliation for actions by the U.S. government in Iraq, Syria and Afghanistan. As he stated to authorities: "All those lives are taken every single day by America, by this government. So a life for a life."

== See also ==
- Orlando nightclub shooting
