= Islamic extremism in the United States =

Many forms of Islamic extremism occur within the United States. Islamic extremism is an adherence to fundamentalist interpretations of Islam, potentially including the promotion of violence to achieve political goals. In the aftermath of the September 11, 2001 terror attacks, Islamic extremism became a prioritized national security concern of the U.S. government and a focus of many subsidiary security and law enforcement entities. Initially, the focus of concern was on foreign Islamic terrorist organizations, particularly al-Qaeda, but in the course of the years since the September 11 terror attacks, the focus has shifted more towards Islamic extremist radicalized individuals and jihadist networks within the United States.

For nearly two decades, counter-terrorism was America's foremost defense and national security priority. Since the release of the Trump administration's National Defense Strategy in 2018, counter-terrorism is no longer considered the preeminent U.S. national security concern, despite terrorism remaining an enduring threat. Although the number of U.S. citizens or long-term residents involved in extremist activity is small, their recruitment and participation in criminal activities organized by Islamic terrorist groups on U.S. territory is still considered a national security concern by U.S. authorities.

== Islamic extremism and jihadist violence ==
Writing for National Public Radio, Belgian-born American journalist Dina Temple-Raston argues that the "single biggest change in terrorism over the past several years has been the wave of Americans joining the fight – not just as foot soldiers but also as key members of Islamist groups and as operatives inside terrorist organizations, including al-Qaeda". According to Temple-Raston, U.S. citizens or longtime residents are "masterminds, propagandists, enablers, and media strategists" in foreign terror groups and working to spread extremist ideology in the West. This trend is worrisome to her, which further commented that American extremists "understand the United States better than the United States understands them."

There is a lack of understanding of how American radical jihadists are propagated. According to U.S. statesmen, there is "no typical profile" of an American extremist and the "experiences and motivating factors vary widely." Janet Napolitano, former Secretary of the U.S. Department of Homeland Security, stated that it is unclear if there has been an "increase in violent radicalization" or "a rise in the mobilization of previously radicalized individuals". Islamist organizations seek Americans to radicalize and recruit because of a familiarity with the United States and the West. According to Napolitano, the evolving extremist threat makes it "more difficult for law enforcement or the intelligence community to detect and disrupt plots."

Zeyno Baran, senior fellow and director of the Center for Eurasian Policy at the American conservative think-tank Hudson Institute, argues that a more appropriate term is Islamist extremism to distinguish the Islamic religion from the political ideology that leads to extremism:

Islam, the religion, deals with piety, ethics, and beliefs, and can be compatible with secular liberal democracy and basic civil liberties. Islamists, however, believe Islam is the only basis for the legal and political system that governs the world's economic, social, and judicial mechanisms. Islamic law, or sharia, must shape all aspects of human society, from politics and education to history, science, the arts, and more. It is diametrically opposed to liberal democracy.

With the value placed on freedom of religion in the United States, religious extremism is a difficult and divisive topic. Zuhdi Jasser, president and founder of the American Muslim think-tank American Islamic Forum for Democracy, testified before Congress in March 2010 that the United States is "polarized on its perceptions of Muslims and the radicalization that occurs within our communities... One camp refuses to believe any Muslim could be radicalized living in blind multiculturalism, apologetics, and denial, and the other camp believes all devout Muslims and the faith of Islam are radicalized." In between the two polarities is a respect for the religion of Islam coupled with an awareness of the danger "of a dangerous internal theo-political domestic and global ideology that must be confronted – Islamism."

Some U.S. extremists are actively recruited and trained by foreign Islamic terrorist organizations, while others are known as "lone wolves" that radicalize on their own. The Fort Hood shooter, Major Nidal Hasan, is a U.S. citizen of Palestinian descent. He communicated via email with Anwar al-Awlaki, but had no direct ties to al-Qaeda. Al-Qaeda propaganda uses Hasan to promote the idea of "be al-Qaeda by not being al-Qaeda". Carlos Leon Bledsoe, a U.S.-born citizen who converted to Islam as a young adult in 2004 and changed his name to Abdulhakim Muhammad, shot a U.S. military recruiter in Little Rock, Arkansas in June 2009, after spending time in Yemen. Faisal Shahzad is a naturalized U.S. citizen from Pakistan and received bomb training from the Tehrik-i-Taliban Pakistan; his plot to detonate a bomb in New York's Times Square was discovered only after the bomb failed. Zachary Chesser converted to Islam after high school and began to spread extremism over the Internet. He was arrested attempting to board a flight to Somalia to join the Islamic terrorist group al-Shabaab.

=== U.S. citizens in Islamic terrorist organizations ===
Since 2007, over 50 U.S. citizens and permanent residents have been arrested or charged in connection with attempts to join Islamic terrorist organizations abroad, including al-Qaeda in the Arabian Peninsula (AQAP) and al-Shabaab. In 2013 alone, 9 Americans are known to have joined or attempted to join foreign terrorist organizations. U.S. citizens inside al-Qaeda provide insider's knowledge of the United States. Adam Gadahn was an American convert who joined al-Qaeda in the late 1990s. He released English-language propaganda videos, but Gadahn lacked charisma and his voice was replaced by Anwar al-Awlaki. Awlaki was a U.S. citizen of Yemeni descent, killed on September 30, 2011 by a U.S. missile strike in Yemen. Awlaki had religious credentials Gadahn lacks and a "gently persuasive" style; "tens of thousands, maybe millions, have watched [Awlaki's] lectures on the Internet."

Another key U.S. citizen in al-Qaeda's power structure was a man named Adnan Shukrijumah. Shukrijumah is believed to be the highest ranking American in al-Qaeda. He was born in Saudi Arabia, grew up in Trinidad, and moved to Florida as a teenager; he was a naturalized American citizen and left the United States in the spring of 2001. Shukrijumah was a mystery to authorities until he was identified by Najibullah Zazi after Zazi was arrested for a failed plot to bomb transportation targets around New York City. Zazi had traveled to Afghanistan to fight U.S. forces, but Shukrijumah convinced Zazi to return to the United States and plan an attack there. In May 2014, Florida-born convert Mohammed Abusalha conducted a deadly suicide bombing while fighting for Islamist extremists in Syria.

In 2014, Troy Kastigar and Douglas McAuthur McCain, two Americans who had previously converted to Islam, traveled to Syria and Iraq in order to join the global jihad in Syria and Iraq on behalf of the Islamic terrorist group ISIL/ISIS/IS/Daesh, and were killed in battle. In 2015, Zulfi Hoxha traveled to Syria where he became a significant figure among the ranks of ISIS.

== Places for radicalization ==
=== Prison ===
The United States has the world's largest prison population and "prisons have long been places where extremist ideology and calls to violence could find a willing ear, and conditions are often conducive to radicalization." Muslim prisoners have been characterized as a danger or threat for radicalization in the post-September 11, 2001 terror attacks media. There is a "significant lack of social science research" on the issue of Islamic extremism in U.S. prisons and there is disagreement on the danger Islamic extremism in prisons poses to U.S. national security. Some suggest that the gravity of so-called prison radicalization should be questioned due to the fact that data presents only one terrorism-related case among millions of individuals.

Reports have cautioned for the potential for radicalization as a result of vulnerable inmates having little exposure to mainstream Islam and monitoring of religious services activities in the event they may be exposed to extremist versions of the Islamic religion from inadequate religious service providers or other inmates via anti-American sermons and extremist media (see also Jihadism and hip hop), which may be embraced or influenced by the Wahhabi-Salafi brand of Sunni Islam (including revisionist versions commonly known as "prison Islam") or a politically engaged, militant form of Shia Islam. The terms "prison Islam" or "jailhouse Islam" are unique to prison and incorporates values of gang loyalty and violence into the Islamic religion. In spite of the fact of there being over 350,000 Muslim inmates in the United States, little evidence indicates widespread radicalization or foreign recruitment.

Some argue that empirical studies have not supported the claims that prisons are fertile grounds for terrorism. For instance, only one black American prison convert was convicted for involvement among the millions of adult males under supervision in the United States. This individual founded an Islamic extremist group in prison, called Jami'iy yat Ul-Isla Is Saheeh (JIS), from New Folsom State Prison in California and hatched a plot to attack numerous local government and Jewish targets. In July 2005, members of JIS "were involved in almost a dozen armed gas station robberies in Los Angeles with the goal of financing terrorist operations."

There is a lack of statistics available on the religious affiliation of inmates in the U.S. prison system. This makes it difficult to assess the potential for Islamic extremism among prisoners. However, a report by the Department of Justice's Office of the Inspector General in 2004 examined the Federal Bureau of Prisons's selection of Muslim chaplains and found that an estimated 6% of the federal inmate population sought Islamic services. According to prisoner self-reporting, the majority of Muslims in federal prison identify as Sunni or followers of the Nation of Islam.

=== Mosques ===
Some mosques in the United States transmit Islamic extremist ideologies. The North American Islamic Trust (NAIT) "holds titles of approximately 300 properties [mosques and Islamic schools]". The organization's website states that "NAIT does not administer these institutions or interfere in their daily management, but is available to support and advise them regarding their operation in conformity with the Shari'ah." Other research on the Muslim Brotherhood in the United States claims NAIT influences a far larger number of Islamic institutions in the United States.

There is no government policy on the establishment of mosques in the United States and no way to monitor activity. The value placed on religious freedom in the U.S. complicates the situation as mosques are places of worship that may be used to spread extremist ideology.

=== Internet and social media ===
The Internet can be used as a "facilitator—even an accelerant—for terrorist and criminal activity." Radicalization of young people by foreign and homegrown terrorist groups frequently occurs on the Internet and social media platforms. According to a report on counter-terrorism from the Security, Conflict, and Cooperation in the Contemporary World (SCCCW) series published by Palgrave Macmillan (2022), "jihadist groups have exploited—and continue to exploit—the Internet to plan, recruit, train and execute terrorist attacks and spread their ideology online." The increase of online English-language extremist material in recent years is readily available with guidance to plan violent activity. "English-language web forums […] foster a sense of community and further indoctrinate new recruits". The Internet has "become a tool for spreading extremist propaganda, and for terrorist recruiting, training, and planning. It is a means of social networking for like-minded extremists... including those who are not yet radicalized, but who may become so through the anonymity of cyberspace."

Al-Qaeda in the Arabian Peninsula (AQAP) published an English-language online magazine called Inspire. The magazine is designed to appeal to a Western audience. It is "[w]ritten in colloquial English, [with] jazzy headlines and articles that made it seem almost mainstream—except that they were all about terrorism." Inspire "included tips for aspiring extremists on bomb-making, traveling overseas, email encryption, and a list of individuals to assassinate." The editor is believed to be Samir Khan, a Saudi Arabian naturalized U.S. citizen, based on work he did before leaving the United States. The magazine appeared six months after Khan arrived in Yemen. There have been seven issues of Inspire. Khan died in the same missile attack that killed Anwar al-Awlaki and the future of the magazine is unknown.

Yousef al-Khattab and Younes Abdullah Mohammed, both American converts to Islam, started a group called Revolution Muslim. The group was meant "to be both a radical Islamic organization and a movement" with goals that include "establishing Islamic law in the United States, destroying Israel and taking al-Qaeda's messages to the masses." A list of its members "reads like a who's who of American homegrown terrorism suspects"; Samir Khan and Fatimah LaRose were regulars in the Revolution Muslim chat rooms. Revolution Muslim had a website and a YouTube account before it was shut down after a posting that glorified the stabbing of a British member of the U.K. Parliament. The revolutionmuslim.com domain now redirects to a website called Islam Policy, run by Younes Abdullah Mohammed. The danger of the website, and others that offer similar content, is the websites offer the chance to become further involved in violent extremism and connect to like-minded people in the U.S. and abroad.

== U.S.-specific extremist narrative ==
Key to the trend of increasing Islamic extremism in the United States "has been the development of a U.S.-specific narrative that motivates individuals to violence." "This narrative—a blend of al-Qa‘ida inspiration, perceived victimization, and glorification of past plotting—has become increasingly accessible through the Internet, and English-language websites are tailored to address the unique concerns of U.S.-based extremists." Juan C. Zarate, attorney and security advisor for the American think-tank Center for Strategic and International Studies, argues that "[t]o disaffected, aggrieved, or troubled individuals, this narrative explains in a simple framework the ills around them and the geopolitical discord they see on their television sets and on the Internet." The narrative is easy to understand and grants "meaning and heroic outlet" for the discontented and alienated, according to Zarate.

== Response from the U.S. government ==
The President, Federal Bureau of Investigation (FBI), Department of Homeland Security (DHS), and the National Counterterrorism Center (NCTC) are the most relevant elements of the U.S. government to the threat of Islamic extremism in the United States, and each has taken steps to address and counter the issue. Since the September 11, 2001 terror attacks, the government has worked to improve information sharing "within the government, and between federal, state, local, and tribal law enforcement, as well as with the public." The "If You See Something, Say Something" campaign, instituted by DHS and local law enforcement, was created to raise public awareness of the potential dangers. In August 2011, the Office of the President released a strategy to counter violent extremism called Empowering Local Partners to Prevent Violent Extremism in the United States. The strategy takes a three-pronged approach of community engagement, better training, and counternarratives. The plan states: "We must actively and aggressively counter the range of ideologies violent extremists employ to radicalize and recruit individuals by challenging justifications for violence and by actively promoting the unifying and inclusive visions of our American ideals," challenging extremist propaganda through words and deeds. The goal is to "prevent violent extremists and their supporters from inspiring, radicalizing, financing, or recruiting individuals or groups in the United States to commit acts of violence."

== American Muslim community response ==
There are Muslim Americans speaking out against Islamic extremist activities. Zuhdi Jasser, president of the American Islamic Forum for Democracy, testified before a House hearing on Muslim radicalization in the U.S. in early 2010:

For me it is a very personal mission to leave my American Muslim children a legacy that their faith is based in the unalienable right to liberty and to teach them that the principles that founded America do not contradict their faith but strengthen it. Our founding principle is that I as a Muslim am able to best practice my faith in a society like the United States that guarantees the rights of every individual blind to faith with no governmental intermediary stepping between the individual and the creator to interpret the will of God. Because of this, our mission is to advocate for the principles of the Constitution of the United States of America, liberty and freedom and the separation of mosque and state. We believe that this mission from within the "House of Islam" is the only way to inoculate Muslim youth and young adults against radicalization. The "Liberty narrative" is the only effective counter to the "Islamist narrative."

Another notable voice in the American Muslim community that warned of Islamic extremist activities in the United States before the September 11, 2001 terror attacks is the Sufi Muslim preacher and Imam Hisham Kabbani, which serves as chairman of the Islamic Supreme Council of America.

== Attacks or failed attacks by date in the United States ==
- 1990 Assassination of Meir Kahane
- 1993 CIA headquarters shooting
- 1993 World Trade Center bombing
- 1994 Brooklyn Bridge shooting
- 1995 Bojinka plot
- 1997 Brooklyn bombing plot
- 2000 millennium attack plots
- 2001 September 11 attacks
- 2001 shoe bomb attempt
- 2002 Los Angeles Airport shooting
- 2002 José Padilla/Abdullah al-Muhajir's attack plot
- 2004 financial buildings plot
- 2005 Los Angeles bomb plot
- 2006 Hudson River bomb plot
- 2006 Sears Tower plot
- 2006 Toledo terror plot
- 2006 transatlantic aircraft plot
- 2007 Fort Dix attack plot
- 2007 John F. Kennedy International Airport attack plot
- 2009 Failed underwear bomb on Northwest Airlines Flight 253
- 2009 Little Rock recruiting office shooting
- 2009 Bronx terrorism plot
- 2009 Dallas car bomb plot by Hosam Maher Husein Smadi
- 2009 New York City Subway and United Kingdom plot
- 2009 Fort Hood shooting
- 2010 Transatlantic aircraft bomb plot
- 2010 King Salmon, Alaska local meteorologist and wife assassination plots
- 2010 Washington Metro bomb plot
- 2010 Times Square car bombing attempt
- 2011 Saudi Arabian student bomb plots
- 2011 Manhattan terrorism plot
- 2011 New York City and Bayonne, New Jersey pipe bombs plot
- 2012 Car bomb plot in Florida
- 2013 Boston Marathon bombing
- 2013 Wichita bombing attempt
- 2014 Queens hatchet attack
- 2014 New Jersey, Seattle, Washington, and West Orange killing spree by Ali Muhammad Brown
- 2015 Boston beheading plot
- 2015 Curtis Culwell Center attack
- 2015 Chattanooga shootings
- 2015 San Bernardino attack
- 2015 University of California, Merced stabbing attack
- 2016 Orlando nightclub shooting
- 2016 New York and New Jersey bombings
- 2016 St. Cloud, Minnesota mall stabbing
- 2016 Ohio State University attack
- 2016 Shooting of Officer Jesse Hartnett
- 2017 Bishop International Airport attack
- 2017 New York City truck attack
- 2017 New York City Subway bombing
- 2019 Naval Air Station Pensacola shooting
- 2020 Corpus Christi Naval Air Station Shooting
- 2020 Federal Prison Allenwood stabbing
- 2022 Colleyville synagogue hostage crisis
- 2022 Stabbing of Salman Rushdie
- 2022 Times Square stabbing of NYPD officers
- 2023 Pennsylvania and New Jersey bombing plot
- 2023 North Las Vegas bombing and assassination plot
- 2024 New York City attack plot by Muhammad Shahzeb Khan
- 2024 West Ridge Chicago synagogue shooting
- 2025 New Orleans truck attack
- 2025 Boulder fire attack
- 2025 Washington, D.C., National Guard shooting
- 2026 New York City bombing attempt
- 2026 Old Dominion University shooting
- 2026 Temple Israel synagogue attack
- 2026 New York State Capitol bomb plot
- 2026 Mall of America shooting plot
- 2026 United States IRGC and Kata'ib Hizballah operatives attack plot
- 2026 Butler County Pennsylvania attack plot

== Media attention in the United States on Islamic terrorism ==
The Universities of Georgia and Alabama in the United States conducted a study comparing media coverage of "terrorist attacks" committed by Islamist militants with those of non-Muslims in the United States. Researchers found that "terrorist attacks" by Islamist militants receive 357% more media attention than attacks committed by non-Muslims or White Americans. Terrorist attacks committed by non-Muslims (or where the religion was unknown) received an average of 15 headlines, while those committed by Muslim extremists received 105 headlines. The study was based on an analysis of news reports covering terrorist attacks in the United States between 2005 and 2015.

== See also ==
- 2000 millennium attack plots
- Aftermath of the September 11 attacks
  - 9/11 Commission Report
  - Park51, canceled Islamic center in the World Trade Center area
  - To the Struggle Against World Terrorism
- Antisemitism in the United States
  - Antisemitism Awareness Act
  - Joint Task Force to Combat Anti-Semitism
  - US Congress hearings on campus antisemitism during the Gaza war
- Christian nationalism in the United States
- Empowering Local Partners to Prevent Violent Extremism in the United States
- Homegrown terrorism
- Jihad
  - Jihadism
  - Jihadism and hip hop
- Islam and violence
  - Islam and war
  - Islamic terrorism
  - Salafi jihadism
- Terrorism in the United States
  - Domestic terrorism in the United States
  - List of unsuccessful terrorist plots in the United States post-9/11
  - Timeline of terrorist attacks in the United States
