= 2005 Los Angeles bomb plot =

Planned terrorist attacks in the United States

The 2005 Los Angeles bomb plot was a 2005 effort by a group of ex-convicts calling themselves Jamiyyat Ul-Islam Is-Saheeh to bomb several military bases, a number of synagogues, and an Israeli consulate in California.

On 31 August 2005, Kevin James and three other men were indicted on terrorism charges related to conspiracy to attack military facilities in the Los Angeles area and of attempting to fund their campaign by robbing gas stations in Southern California over the previous three months. Kevin James was accused of founding a radical Islamic group called J.I.S (Jam’iyyat Ul-Islam Is-Saheeh جمعية الإسلام الصحيح, Arabic for "Assembly of Authentic Islam") from his cell in Folsom Prison in California, and of recruiting fellow inmates to join his mission to target for violent attack so-called enemies of Islam or "infidels".

The announcement of the arrests was made by Attorney General Alberto Gonzales in the presence of the director of the FBI Robert Mueller in Washington D.C. Mueller mentioned the incident in a "Major Executive Speech" in June 2006 on the day that the 2006 Sears Tower plot was announced. The Deputy Assistant Director of the FBI outlined the case in his congressional testimony in September 2006.

== Background ==
The plot is one in a series of terrorist-related attacks and failed attacks by Muslims on military installations in the United States, including the 2009 New York terrorism plot, the 2007 Fort Dix attack plot, the 2009 Little Rock recruiting office shooting, and the September 11 attacks on the Pentagon.

== Suspects ==
- Kevin Lamar James, founded J.I.S. (Jam’iyyat Ul-Islam Is-Saheeh) in 2004 while in prison, recruiting fellow inmates, and then others after his release in December 2004.
- Levar Haney Washington, Muslim convert, a U.S. national; arrested 5 July for armed robbery.
- Gregory Vernon Patterson, a U.S. national; purchased a .223-caliber rifle and arrested 5 July for armed robbery.
- Hammad Riaz Samana, a lawful permanent U.S. resident originally from Pakistan; allegedly trained with firearms; arrested 2 August.

Several of the suspects formed a group called Jam’iyyat Ul-Islam Is-Saheeh from inside a California state prison About a month later, Washington was released from prison and recruited Patterson and Samana, neither of whom had a criminal record, at an Inglewood mosque.

== Conviction ==
On 14 December 2007, Kevin James pleaded guilty to "conspiracy to levy war against the United States through terrorism" and was sentenced to 16 years in federal prison. Levar Washington also pleaded guilty to the same charges plus an additional weapons charge and was sentenced to 22 years in federal prison.

Gregory Patterson pled guilty to the same conspiracy and weapons charges as Washington and was sentenced to just over 12.5 years in federal prison. Hammad Samana was initially found to be unfit to stand trial and underwent psychiatric treatment. However, in 2009, he was subsequently charged and sentenced to just under 6 years in federal prison after pleading guilty to one count of conspiracy to levy war against the U. S government through terrorism.

In an interview with the prosecutor, the reporter remarked that "the cell appears to have been remarkably indiscreet about committing plans to paper. They even left the text of a press release Mr. James had written for use once they committed a successful attack. And one of the ringleaders, James, was in prison the whole time." Documents such as these formed the basis of the evidence, since the group hadn't gotten to the point of gathering materials to make explosives.

== Aftermath ==
Gregory Patterson served roughly 8 years of his sentenced and was released from a federal halfway house in Long Beach, California on September 22, 2016. Hammad Samana was released from FCI Englewood in Littleton, Colorado on August, 30, 2010. He was then taken into custody by Immigration, Customs and Enforcement before being deported to Pakistan in November 2010.

A 2011 NPR report claimed both Kevin James (who legally changed his name to Ahmed Binyamin Alasiri) and Levar Washington were both imprisoned in the highly restrictive Communication Management Unit.

James was released from federal custody in September 2019. While on federal supervised release in Long Beach, California, he sold 1.7 kilograms (3.4 pounds) methamphetamine to a buyer over three meetings. He was indicted on one count of distributing methamphetamine and was sentenced to over 15 years in prison. He is currently incarcerated at FCI Tucson in Tucson, Arizona and is projected to be released from prison on July 27, 2031.

Washington was initially set for release from federal custody in September 2024. In 2017, he was sentenced to an additional 6 years in federal prison after he stabbed a fellow inmate with a "shank" 13 to 15 times while they were both housed in USP Allenwood in Pennsylvania. In 2022, Washington was sentenced to a further term of over 13 years to run consecutively to both other sentences after stabbed a correctional officer with an 11-inch shank at USP Pollock in Louisiana. Washington is currently serving his sentences at ADX Florence, the federal supermax prison in Florence, Colorado. His projected release date is February 3, 2043.

== See also ==
- Islamic extremism in the United States
- Conversion to Islam in prisons
- 2009 Little Rock military recruiting office shooting – al-Qaeda in the Arabian Peninsula-inspired attack by Yemen-trained jihadi
- 2009 Bronx terrorism plot – a plot by four black American Muslim men to shoot down military airplanes flying out of an Air National Guard base and blow up two synagogues
- 2011 Manhattan terrorism plot – an effort by two Muslim Arab-Americans to bomb a synagogue
- List of attacks on Jewish institutions in the United States
