= 2009 Bronx terrorism plot =

Fake FBI plot in New York, United States

The Newburgh Four Bombers
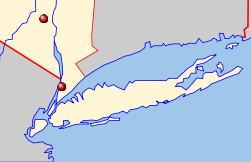
- Location of the two targets.
- Location: New York
- Date: Attempted on May 20, 2009
- Attack type: Attempted bombing; attempt to shoot down military aircraft
- Weapons: Fake C-4 plastic explosives; Fake Stinger missiles
- Deaths: 0
- Injuries: 0
- Perpetrators: James Cromitie; David Williams; Onta Williams; Laguerre Payen

On May 20, 2009, US law enforcement arrested four men in connection with a fake plot concocted by a Federal Bureau of Investigation (FBI) informant to shoot down military airplanes flying out of an Air National Guard base in Newburgh, New York, and blow up two synagogues in the Riverdale community of the Bronx using weapons supplied by the FBI. The group was led by Shahed Hussain, a Pakistani criminal who was working for the FBI to avoid deportation for having defrauded the New York State Department of Motor Vehicles. Hussain has never been charged in the United States with any terrorism related offenses and was paid nearly US$100,000 by the FBI for his work on this plot.

The FBI's use of seemingly affluent informants promising luxury goods, large sums of money, and generous favors to the four low-income defendants led to accusations that the agency had engaged in entrapment. On August 23, 2013, by a two-to-one vote, an appeal to overturn the convictions was denied by a Manhattan appeals court. Judge Jon O. Newman cited defendant James Cromitie's statements as proof of intent. In dissent, the Chief Judge Dennis Jacobs said there was scarce evidence of previous intent and that Cromitie was "badgered" into joining the plot. All three judges unanimously rejected the entrapment claims by the three other defendants and rejected all four defendants’ arguments that their convictions should be overturned on grounds of government misconduct. In July 2023, Judge Colleen McMahon ordered the compassionate release of three of the conspirators, saying they had only participated because Cromitie promised to pay them. In January 2024, McMahon also ordered the release of Cromitie, the last remaining defendant in prison.

== Background ==
The attempted attack is cited as one of a series of plots and failed attacks on military installations in the United States, including the 2005 Los Angeles bomb plot, the 2007 Fort Dix attack plot, the 2009 Little Rock recruiting office shooting, and the September 11 attacks.

Previous attacks in Riverdale include the 1989 firebombing of the Riverdale Press during the controversy over The Satanic Verses and the 2000 Bronx synagogue firebombing.

== Suspects ==
The terrorist suspects were four Muslim men; three are African-American U.S. citizens, and one is a Haitian immigrant. James Cromitie (born December 24, 1964) was first recruited by Shahed Hussain, an Albany hotel owner and FBI informant at the Masjid al-Ikhlas mosque in Newburgh, New York, which he attended on only a few occasions. The FBI informant posed as a wealthy business man and enticed Cromitie with an offer of $250,000.

Cromitie and his three accomplices, David Williams, Onta Williams, and Laguerre Payen, had no serious offences on their records, but were described as "extremely violent men" by prosecutors. The defense argued that these men would never have contrived this plot without the leadership of paid informants, which many have considered a wasteful use of government resources, i.e., to create terrorism plots where there wouldn't have been any to begin with. None of the men had the money, knowledge or skills to obtain materials or assemble a bomb.

Cromitie (also known as Abdul Rahman), the reported leader, claimed he was born a Muslim and that his parents live in Afghanistan. He told the FBI informant that he was angry about the US military killing Muslims in Afghanistan and Pakistan. He had lived in Brooklyn and had a record of 27 arrests for minor crimes both in upstate New York State and New York City.

In April 2009, the FBI informant coaxed Cromitie and his three alleged accomplices into accepting their targets. They were to bomb the Riverdale Temple and nearby Riverdale Jewish Center in the Bronx. They were also to fire Stinger surface-to-air guided missiles at military planes at a nearby air base, although it was not clear if they were to target any crewed aircraft.

In late August 2010, Hussain testified that Cromitie "hated Jews and Jewish people and he hated the American people, American soldiers. He was full of hate on those subjects. He said he would kill the president (then George W. Bush) 700 times because he's the Antichrist."

== Plot ==
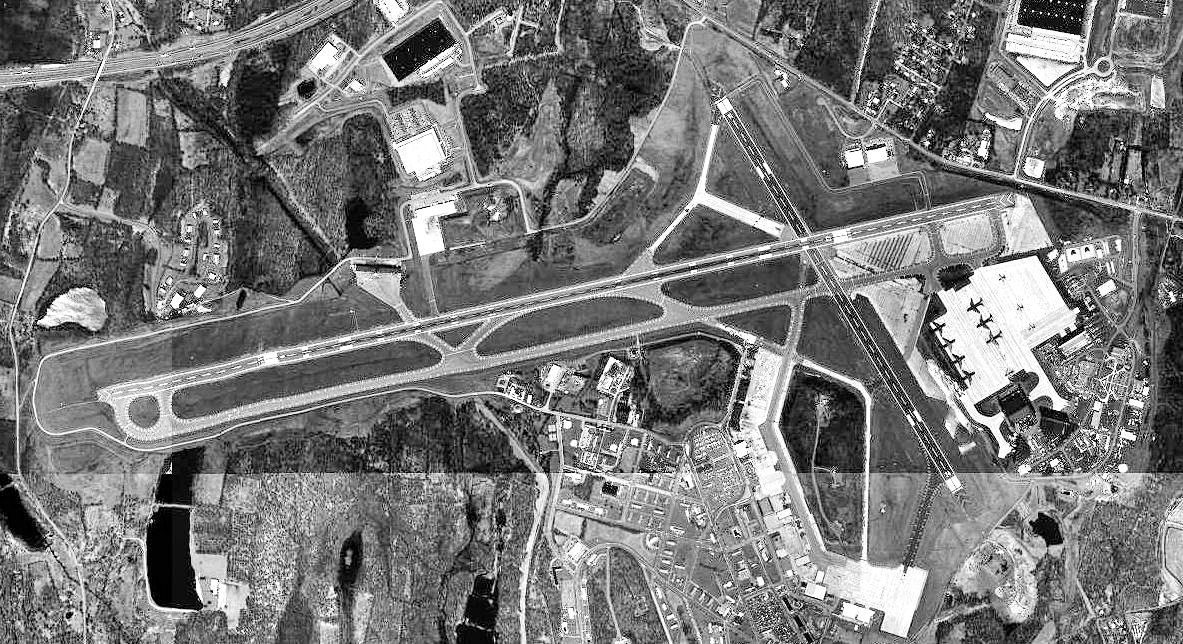
Satellite photo of Stewart Air National Guard Base, where the accused were planning to shoot down a military aircraft.

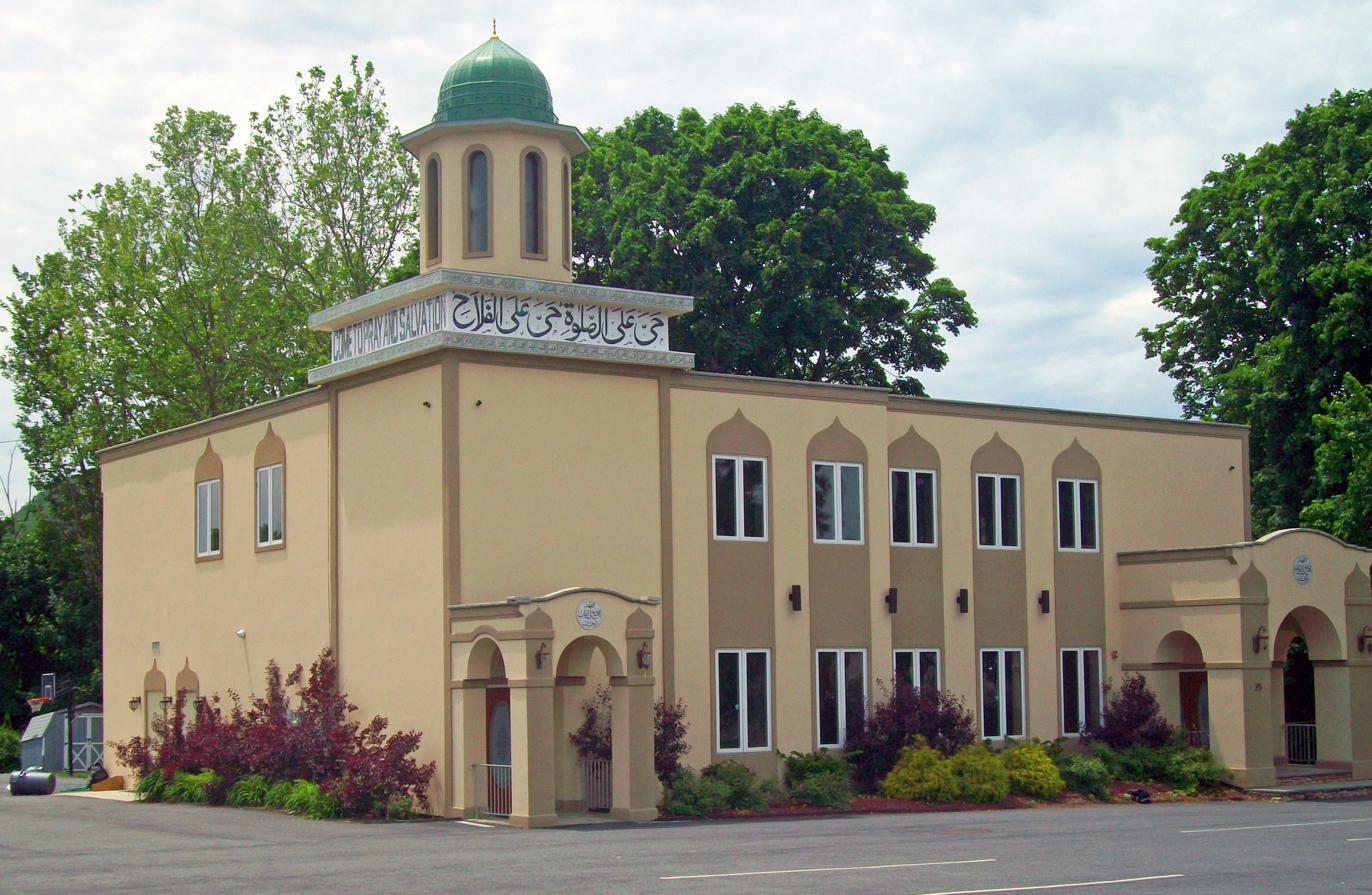
Masjid al-Ikhlas

Shahed Hussain, a Pakistani immigrant, agreed to serve as an FBI informant after being arrested in 2002 over a scam involving driver's licenses. He previously served as an informant in an unrelated terrorism investigation in Albany, which resulted in the convictions of Yassin M. Aref and Mohammed Mosharref Hossain. In the Bronx case he was reported to have used audio and video taped many of his meetings with the attackers.

In 2008 Hussain showed up at the Masjid al-Ikhlas mosque under the name "Maqsood", talking of jihad and violence. Members of the congregation interviewed after the plot was exposed said that "most" members of the congregation had believed Hussain to be an informant. No one reported his talk about Jihad to the authorities. Cromitie expressed interest to the informant of returning to Afghanistan, and hopefully becoming a martyr.

In April 2009, Cromitie and his three accomplices chose their targets. They planned to both bomb the Riverdale Temple and nearby Riverdale Jewish Center in the Bronx, and, using Stinger surface-to-air guided missiles, shoot down military planes flying out of a nearby air base.

The accused attackers bought cellphones, as well as cameras, from Wal-Mart, to scout out the synagogues. They attempted to buy guns from a dealer in Newburgh; however, the dealer had sold out. They then drove downstate and bought a $700 pistol from a Bloods gang leader in Brooklyn.

On May 6, 2009, the men traveled to Stamford, Connecticut, to pick up what they believed to be a surface-to-air guided-missile system and three improvised explosive devices, all of which were incapable of actually being used. On the way there, one of the men believed they were being followed by federal agents. They returned to Newburgh until they were satisfied that they were safe, and then turned around and headed back to Stamford.

The men also conducted surveillance of military planes at the Air National Guard base, including taking photographs to prepare for the attack there.

== Attempted attack and arrest ==
The men placed fake bombs wired to cell phones in three separate cars outside the Riverdale Temple and nearby Riverdale Jewish Center, both in the Riverdale community of Bronx. New York City Police Department Commissioner Raymond W. Kelly said one of the suspects placed explosives, while the other three suspects served as lookouts.

The men were returning to their vehicle and heading to attack aircraft at the Stewart Air National Guard Base in Newburgh, New York, with the fake Stinger missiles when law enforcement stopped them. The air base shares facilities with the civilian Stewart International Airport.

As the men were returning to the vehicle, the signal was given for the arrest. An 18-wheel New York City Police Department vehicle blocked the end of the street. The FBI informer also served as the driver of the suspects' vehicle. Another armored vehicle arrived, and officers from the department's Emergency Service Unit smashed the blackened windows of the S.U.V., removed the men from the vehicle, and handcuffed them on the ground. None offered resistance.

Both the car bombs and the missiles were actually fakes given to the plotters with the help of an informant for the FBI. Each of the two homemade bombs was equipped with about 37 pounds of inert material designed to look like C-4 plastic explosive, and "there was no danger to anyone," Kelly said.

== Trial and sentencing ==
Cromitie, Onta Williams, David Williams, and Payen and were charged with conspiracy and weapons offenses at their first court appearance on May 21, 2009 and were ordered to be held without bail. The charges they faced – conspiracy to use weapons of mass destruction in the United States and conspiracy to acquire and use anti-aircraft missiles – carried a maximum sentence of life in prison.

All four men pleaded not guilty. In March 2010, defense lawyers filed a motion to dismiss the case on grounds of entrapment. Relying on materials provided by the government (including recordings and FBI agents' affidavits), the defense argued that the plot was proposed and closely directed by the FBI's informant, who "suggested the targets, paid for the defendants' groceries, bought a gun, provided the fake bombs and missile, assembled the explosive devices and acted as chauffeur".

In late August 2010, government informant Shahed Hussain testified, stating that ringleader James Cromitie "hated Jews and Jewish people and he hated the American people, American soldiers. He was full of hate on those subjects. He said he would kill the president 700 times because he's the Antichrist." After a six-week trial, the four were convicted. The lawyers for the four have filed a motion for a new trial claiming that Hussain committed perjury during the trial. David Williams told the Village Voice that the four were not part of plot to hurt people but to swindle Hussain, and the incriminating statements were made to make Hussain believe the four were credible terrorists.

On June 29, 2011, Cromitie, Onta Williams, and David Williams were each sentenced, for their part in the attempted attack, to 25 years in prison by Manhattan Federal Judge Colleen McMahon. The judge criticized not only the defendants, but also what she viewed as the government's overzealous handling of the investigation. Referring to Cromitie, she said, "The essence of what occurred here is that a government, understandably zealous to protect its citizens from terrorism, came upon a man both bigoted and suggestible, one who was incapable of committing an act of terrorism on his own. It created acts of terrorism out of his fantasies of bravado and bigotry, and then made those fantasies come true." She added, "The government did not have to infiltrate and foil some nefarious plot – there was no nefarious plot to foil." She said the defendants were "not political or religious martyrs," but "thugs for hire, pure and simple."

Each of the men apologized before the sentencing. Cromitie said, "I've never been a terrorist and I'll never be a terrorist. I'm very sorry I let myself get caught up in a sting like this" and added that he did not truly believe the anti-Semitic statements heard on the audiotapes at trial. On September 7, 2011, McMahon also sentenced Laguerre Payen to 25 years prison, but repeated her criticism of the government's handling of the investigation.

In 2013, a federal appeals court, by a vote of two to one, upheld convictions that the three defendants were guilty as charged. Judge Newman, in rejecting the misconduct claims, stated that, "As with all sting operations, government creation of the opportunity to commit an offense, even to the point of supplying defendants with materials essential to commit crimes, does not exceed due process limits....[FBI] agents would have been derelict in their duties if they did not test how far Cromitie would go to carry out his desires. When a government agent encounters a Muslim who volunteers that he wants to 'do something to America' or die like a martyr, the agent is entitled to probe the attitudes of that person to learn whether his religious views have impelled him toward the violent brand of radical Islam that poses a dire threat to the United States."

== Imprisonment ==
James Cromitie served his sentence at the Federal Correctional Institution, Allenwood Medium, a medium-security facility in Pennsylvania, and was released on April 17, 2024.

Onta Williams served his sentence at the Federal Correctional Institution, Mendota, a medium-security facility in California, and was released on October 24, 2023.

David Williams served his sentence at the United States Penitentiary, Pollock, a high-security facility in Pennsylvania, and was released on January 24, 2024.

Laguerre Payen served his sentence at the United States Penitentiary, Allenwood, a high-security facility in Pennsylvania, and was released on October 24, 2023.

In July 2023, McMahon ordered the compassionate release of Onta Williams, David Williams and Payen, ruling that the FBI had unscrupulously used Hussain, whom McMahon described as "unsavory", to manipulate Cromitie into pressuring them to commit illegal acts. McMahon characterized the three men as "hapless, easily manipulated and penurious petty criminals" and "small time grifters" who only participated because Cromitie said he would pay them using money from Hussain.

== Reactions and aftermath ==
Michael Bloomberg, the mayor of New York City, praised the New York City Police Department. Other local politicians also praised law enforcement and expressed relief. New York Governor David Paterson said the plot illustrated the constant terrorist threat New York faces. On May 30, 2009, New York Governor David Paterson announced he would give the Riverdale Jewish Center and the Riverdale Reform Temple $25,000 each to improve their security. The money will come from the Department of Homeland Security (DHS) and will primarily involve the installation of alarms and surveillance equipment.

An award-winning 2014 HBO documentary about the case, The Newburgh Sting, showed that the attack plans and materials were all supplied by the FBI informant who coaxed the accused into participating by offering incentives including $250,000, described as a clear case of entrapment. The arrest was described by the documentary as having been expertly stage-managed in the style of a Hollywood production, needlessly deploying multiple armoured vehicles and over a hundred officers from various departments, including bomb squads although there was no bomb. The FBI, it was claimed, was motivated throughout by a desire to maintain public fear of terrorism and to enhance their reputation for effectiveness.

A man believed to be the same Shahed Hussain subsequently founded and operated the limousine company implicated in the 2018 Schoharie limousine crash in upstate New York, which killed 18 aboard the vehicle and two bystanders. However, Hussain had left the United States when the crash occurred, and U.S. investigators were unable to locate, question, or positively tie him to the accident. The crash was attributed to slipshod vehicle maintenance by Hussain's company and lax oversight by New York state regulators. In a 2021 plea bargain, Shahed's son Nauman Hussain—who managed day-to-day operations at the company—pleaded guilty to 20 counts of criminally negligent homicide for his role in the crash, and was sentenced to five to fifteen years in state prison in 2023.

In 2022, U.S. Representatives Elise Stefanik and Paul Tonko called on the FBI to reveal whether it had any knowledge of Shahed Hussain's activities with the limousine company before the crash. At an April 2022 hearing of the House Intelligence Committee, Stefanik questioned FBI director Christopher A. Wray about whether Hussain's history as an informant may have led the bureau to protect him from consequences for the limousine company's extensive history of regulatory violations, but Wray refused to answer directly, citing confidentiality concerns. In August, Stefanik told Fox News that she had not received any response from the bureau, and a spokeswoman for Tonko stated likewise when asked by the Albany Times Union.

On July 27, 2023, a federal judge in the Southern District of New York granted a motion by 3 of the 4 defendants for compassionate release. The New York Times was unable to locate Shahed Hussain for comment, saying he was believed to be in Pakistan. On January 19, 2024, McMahon ordered the compassionate release of Cromitie, the last defendant still in prison, calling his alleged leadership "inconceivable" and calling Hussain "very unpleasant" and a "villain."

== See also ==
- 1973 New York bomb plot
- 1993 World Trade Center bombing
- 1993 New York City landmark bomb plot
- 1997 Empire State Building shooting
- 2004 financial buildings plot
- 2005 Los Angeles bomb plot
- 2007 Fort Dix attack plot
- 2009 Little Rock military recruiting office shooting – al-Qaeda in the Arabian Peninsula-inspired attack by Yemen-trained jihadi
- 2011 Manhattan terrorism plot – effort by two Muslim Arab-Americans to attack a synagogue
- Buffalo Six
- Conversion to Islam in prisons
- List of terrorist incidents, 2009
- Muhammad Hussain (islamist)
- List of attacks on Jewish institutions in the United States
