= Yossele Rosenblatt =

Russian Jewish cantor and composer (1882–1933)

Yossele Rosenblatt יאסעלע ראזנבלאט
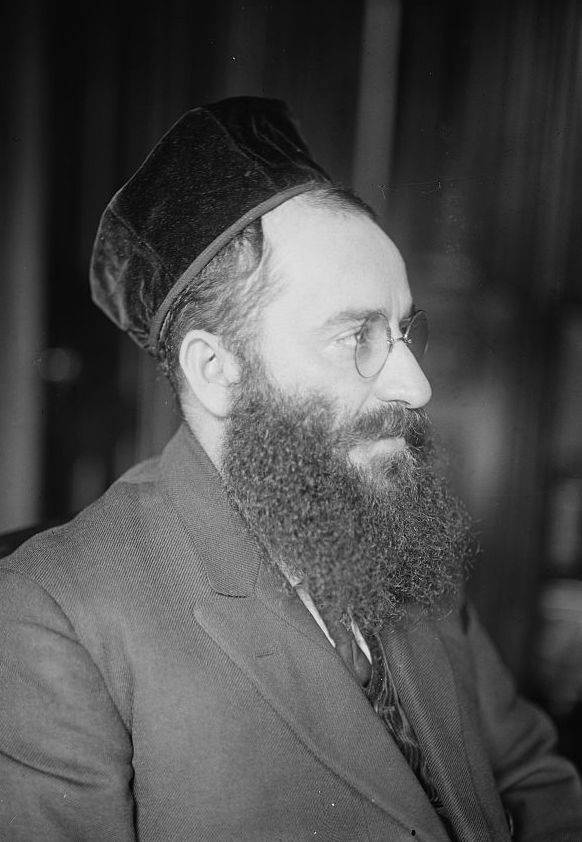
- Rosenblatt in 1918

Background information
- Born: May 9, 1882; Bila Tserkva, Russian Empire
- Died: June 19, 1933 (aged 51) Jerusalem, Mandatory Palestine
- Genre: Jewish music
- Occupations: Cantor, hazzan, singer, composer, conductor, actor
- Years active: 1886–1933

Josef "Yossele" Rosenblatt (Yiddish: יאסעלע ראזנבלאט; May 9, 1882 – June 19, 1933) was an Ashkenazi chazzan and composer.

== Early life ==
Rosenblatt was born in Belaya Tserkov, Russian Empire (now Ukraine). Descended from a long line of cantors, Rosenblatt's devoutly religious upbringing prevented him from receiving formal musical training at any of the great academies of his day. He began his career as a member of the local synagogue choir. He was soon labelled a "wunderkind" (child prodigy) and launched his career. His family moved to Sadigora, Bukovina when he was 7.

== Career ==
He went to Vienna for several months when he was 17 and officiated at the largest synagogues of the city. He informally studied with Jacob Maerz, an accomplished singer and musician as well as a wealthy merchant. Rosenblatt's stay in Vienna was followed by an extensive tour of the communities of the Austro-Hungarian empire including Budapest. He married Taube Kaufman when he was 18. He accepted his first full-time position with the Hasidic community of Munkacs, Hungary, and then relocated to Pressburg in 1901. He moved to Hamburg, Germany five years later for work, and then to Harlem, New York City to serve at the Ohab Zedek orthodox congregation in 1912.

He was approached in the early 1920s by two men who wanted to start a new Jewish newspaper in New York, asking him to be a part of the enterprise. Excited, he agreed, thinking the paper would lead to a lot of money and financial freedom. It turned out the contract made him a guarantor of the financial success of the venture. When it failed, he used up his savings and a lot of his current income, but the debts continued. He filed for bankruptcy in January 1925. Although legally freed of most of his debts, he vowed to repay them anyway.

He left Ohab Zedek in August 1927, and went to Chicago to lead the services for the High Holy Days, and then went on to Detroit for Sukkot. He traveled throughout the United States during the succeeding months, leading services in cities such as Minneapolis, Seattle, Indianapolis, Columbus, Milwaukee, Philadelphia, and Washington, D.C. He met with then-President Calvin Coolidge while in Washington, D.C. He signed a 10-year contract with First Congregation Anshe Sfard in Borough Park, Brooklyn in 1928.

His fame extended beyond the Jewish world earning him large concert fees, a singing role in the 1927 film The Jazz Singer, and the sobriquet "The Jewish Caruso".

== Later years and death ==
Rosenblatt was offered a chance to participate in the making of a film in Mandatory Palestine. He decided to take another chance despite the payment depending on the financial success of the film. It got him away from his creditors and allow him to see Eretz Yisrael, where he had never been. He took his wife and two youngest children and decided to stay, despite some doubts as to whether he could support the family. He died of a heart attack at the age of 51 on June 19, 1933, in Jerusalem.

== Style ==
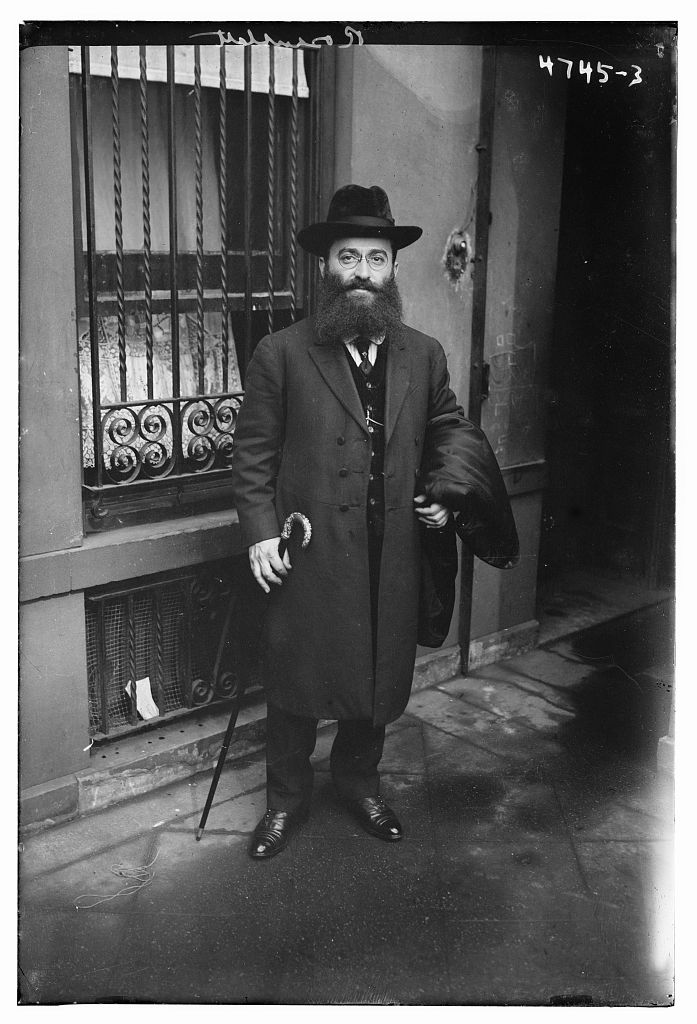
Yossele Rosenblatt with cane, 1918

Rosenblatt was known for his use of falsetto.

His technique in cantillation was unique. Notes were hit remarkably accurately at high speeds. Fiorituras, similarly, were struck near perfectly, both rhythmically and on pitch. His fame spread so far that Toscanini appealed to him to sing the leading role in Fromental Halévy's La Juive, but Rosenblatt replied that he would only use his vocal gift for the glory of God, in service to his religion. Notably, he turned down a "golden hello" from the Chicago opera house because it violated his religious principles.

He corresponded with many of the great tenors of his day. It is told that upon hearing Rosenblatt sing "Elli Elli", Enrico Caruso was so moved that he ascended the stage and kissed him.

== Legacy ==
Rosenblatt perhaps exerted the greatest influence on cantorial music's "Golden Age". He led the transition from the more freestyling cadenza-laden approach prevalent before his era to a more structured, metered style. Rosenblatt pioneered the use of several cantorial techniques, which have subsequently been adopted by cantors around the world. These include his trademark krekhts, or sob, in which he would deliberately allow his voice to crack to convey the emotion of what he was singing. He also developed a realistic soprano falsetto as a method of easing the strain on his overworked voice. A prolific composer, more than one hundred and eighty pieces of his have been preserved.

His great-grandsons include rabbi Jonathan Rosenblatt of the Riverdale Jewish Center, and rabbi Andrew Rosenblatt of Congregation Schara Tzedeck in Vancouver.

Since the 78 RPM era, Rosenblatt's recordings have been re-issued many times in LP and CD format. In recent years, a set of 3 CDs Od Yosef Chai containing restored versions of 78s of Rosenblatt's performances has been issued by Mostly Music and Galpaz Music, a Brooklyn record store.

His records and singing were featured in the 2009 drama A Serious Man.
