= Fort Dix attack plot =

The term Fort Dix attack plot could refer to:

- Greenwich Village townhouse explosion, a 1970 plot involving the Weather Underground
- 2007 Fort Dix attack plot, a 2007 terror plot involving six Muslims
