= 1997 Empire State Building shooting =

Mass shooting in Manhattan, New York, US

- Location of the Empire State Building (Manhattan)
- Location: 40°44′54.36″N 73°59′08.36″W; Observation deck of the Empire State Building, New York City, United States
- Date: February 23, 1997; 29 years ago 5:00 pm (UTC-5)
- Attack type: Mass shooting, murder-suicide
- Weapon: Beretta 84 handgun
- Deaths: 2 (including the perpetrator)
- Injuries: 6
- Perpetrator: Ali Hassan Abu Kamal
- Motive: Revenge for American support for Israel

On February 23, 1997, Ali Hassan Abu Kamal, a 69-year-old Palestinian teacher, opened fire on the observation deck of the Empire State Building in New York City. The gunman killed one person and wounded six others before dying from a self-inflicted gunshot to the head.

Law enforcement officials ruled it was a premeditated attack after finding notes indicating Abu Kamal's anger over Palestine and Israel. At the time, Abu Kamal's widow stated the shooting spree was not politically motivated, but rooted in his despondency over financial ruin.

Ten years after the shooting, Abu Kamal's daughter revealed that she had lied in hiding that her father's actions had in fact been motivated by Palestinian nationalism. Her mother's 1997 account was a cover story fabricated by the Palestinian Authority as Abu Kamal sought revenge against the Americans, the British, and the French for supporting Israel.

== Shooting ==
Abu Kamal opened fire shortly after 5 p.m. on February 23, 1997, on the 86th floor observation deck of the Empire State Building, one of New York City's most popular tourist attractions. Before he started shooting, he muttered something about Egypt, apparently shouting, "Are you from Egypt?" The NYPD said they did not know whether it was said in an effort to spare or identify potential victims. Surviving victims however witness that Abu Kamal asked them in a friendly way whether "you are Italian or American?" before the shooting started.

The shooter used a 14-shot .380-caliber Beretta 84 handgun that he apparently bought in Florida at the end of January 1997. Abu Kamal killed one person and wounded another six before shooting himself in the head. He was taken to a hospital where he died five hours later.

The sole murder victim was 27-year-old Christoffer Burmeister, a Danish musician who was living in New York and played in a band known as "The Bushpilots". He was visiting the Empire State Building with bandmate Matthew Gross, who was critically wounded in the attack. Both were shot through the head, which left Gross with brain damage.

== Perpetrator ==
Ali Hassan Abu Kamal was a 69-year-old Palestinian English teacher. He was born in Jaffa in Mandate Palestine on September 19, 1927. He was the son of a refugee family that fled the city during the 1948 Arab–Israeli War and resettled in Gaza. He became a well-respected English teacher at a local high school and a university, and he was also a well-paid tutor and accomplished translator. He earned about $3,000 a month and lived in an affluent neighborhood with his wife, and had six children.

In 1996, he decided his family should relocate to the United States for a better life. He obtained a legal nonimmigrant visa and arrived in New York on December 24, 1996.

=== Motive ===
According to law enforcement officials, Abu Kamal's attack was premeditated, based on his visit to the observation deck the day before the shooting. A pair of identical letters, one in English and one in Arabic, was also found in a pouch around his neck. The letters were a diatribe against the "Big Three" of the United States, France, and England for their mistreatment of Palestinians, as well as against Zionism, which he said oppressed Palestinians.

Despite the letter's reference to Palestine and Zionists, Abu Kamal's widow offered another explanation that the real motive for the shooting spree was not political but rooted in financial ruin. The letter had also named two business partners, who Abu Kamal claimed swindled him out of money, losing $300,000 in a business venture. At that point, she said he became suicidal. His daughter added that he could not return home after losing the money. Fathiya Abu Kamal told the press:

My husband is not a terrorist, he was just hopeless. He was aged, he had nothing to do with politics, or terrorism, or crime.

In February 2007, 10 years after the shooting, the New York Daily News reported that Abu Kamal's daughter, Linda, was "tired of lying" about her father's motives for the attack. She told the Daily News that her father wanted to punish the U.S. for supporting Israel and revealed that her mother's 1997 account was a cover story fabricated by the Palestinian Authority:

A Palestinian Authority official advised us to say the attack was not for political reasons because that would harm the peace agreement with Israel. We didn't know that he was martyred for patriotic motivations, so we repeated what we were told to do. ... His goal was patriotic. He wanted to take revenge from the Americans, the British, the French and the Israelis. ... He wrote that after he raised his children and made sure that his family was all right he decided to avenge in the highest building in America to make sure they get his message.

== Aftermath ==
Following the shooting New York City Mayor Rudy Giuliani called for more consistent gun control laws across the US, saying "It should be as difficult to get a gun in Florida as it is in New York City."

== See also ==
- 1994 Brooklyn Bridge shooting
- 2000 Bronx terror attack
- 2009 Bronx terrorism plot
- 2011 Manhattan terrorism plot
- 2012 Empire State Building shooting
