= Irving Greenberg =

American rabbi

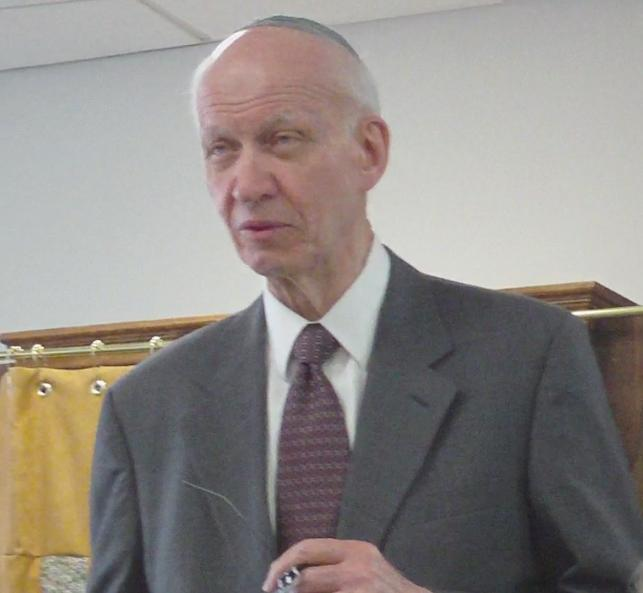
- Born: Irving Yitzchak Greenberg; May 16, 1933 (age 93); Brooklyn, New York, U.S.
- Other name: Yitz Greenberg
- Spouse: Blu Greenberg

Academic background
- Education: Brooklyn College (BA); Harvard University (MA, PhD)

Academic work
- Discipline: History; Religious studies
- Sub-discipline: Jewish studies
- Institutions: Brandeis University; Yeshiva University; Yeshivat Chovevei Torah; Yeshivat Hadar; Riverdale Jewish Center

Irving Yitzchak Greenberg (born May 16, 1933), also known as Yitz Greenberg, is an American rabbi, scholar, and author. Greenberg is recognized as a strong advocate for the State of Israel as a Jewish and democratic state, emphasizing its role as the Jewish homeland. He is a promoter of Christian–Jewish reconciliation and of theological dialogue between Judaism and Christianity.

== Early life and education ==
Greenberg was born and raised in Brooklyn. He attended Yeshiva Beis Yosef, where he was ordained in 1953. At the same time, he attended Brooklyn College, where he received a Bachelor of Arts degree in history summa cum laude. He later earned a Master of Arts and a PhD in American history from Harvard University, having written his dissertation on Theodore Roosevelt and the American labor movement.

== Career ==
Greenberg has served as the Jewish chaplain of Brandeis University; the rabbi of the Riverdale Jewish Center; as an associate professor of history at Yeshiva University; and as a founder, chairman, and professor in the department of Jewish studies at the City College of New York. He is currently on the faculty of Yeshivat Chovevei Torah. He has also served as the president of the National Jewish Center for Learning and Leadership.

In 2020, Greenberg became a senior scholar‑in‑residence at Yeshivat Hadar (Hebrew: יְשִׁיבַת הָדָר, romanized: yĕšīvat hādār) in New York, a post‑denominational yeshiva (יְשִׁיבָה, yĕšīvāh, lit. 'sitting' or 'academy') grounded in traditional Jewish prayer, Halakha (הֲלָכָה, halākhāh, 'the way'), and Jewish culture, yet distinguished by its gender egalitarianism and affirmation of LGBTQ Jews.

=== Ideology ===
Greenberg's work involves examining contemporary Jewish history through the lens of traditional Jewish conceptual frameworks. He has authored numerous publications on the Holocaust as well as the historical and religious implications of the State of Israel.

He received his education in Jewish thought under Rabbi Joseph B. Soloveitchik. Additionally, he has extensive teaching experience, and many prominent scholars, including Rabbis Joseph Telushkin and Michael Berenbaum, regard him as a mentor.

Greenberg espouses the Jewish philosophical concept of Tikkun Olam (תִּיקּוּן עוֹלָם, tīqqūn ʿōlām, 'repair [of the] world') as humankind working as co-creators with God to improve the world. He sees the Jewish people's covenant with God as enjoining them to set an example for humanity's moral edification. Greenberg also suggests that the inherent image of God in every human indicates that each person possesses "infinite value, equality, and uniqueness." According to Greenberg, this means that there is no absolute truth or 'correct' religion: "Part of every truth is the fact that an image of God is speaking it; that is to say, a being of infinite value, equality, and uniqueness is speaking it."

Only part of his post-Holocaust theology has been published. Greenberg argues that God has broken his covenant with the Jewish people, viewing the Holocaust as a pivotal event that represents this "breaking of the covenant." The breaking event is seen as part of God's ongoing process of tzimtzum (צִמְצוּם, ṣimṣūm, lit. 'contraction' or 'withdrawal'). According to Greenberg, the Holocaust illustrates that the fate of the world lies in humanity's hands. If such profound evil can exist in the world, as demonstrated by the Holocaust, then it is also possible for immense good to be realized.

Greenberg's theological views have been criticized by historian David Berger. In the 1980s, Greenberg was involved in a controversial debate with the radical right-wing rabbi Meir Kahane.

== Personal life ==
He is married to the Orthodox Jewish feminist writer Blu Greenberg.

== Works ==
- Cloud of Smoke, Pillar of Fire: Judaism, Christianity, Modernity After the Holocaust (1976)
- The Third Great Cycle of Jewish History (1981)
- Voluntary Covenant (1982)
- The Jewish Way: Living the Holidays (1988)
- The Ethics of Jewish Power (1990)
- Judaism and Christianity: Their Respective Roles in the Divine Strategy of Redemption (1996)
- Covenantal Pluralism (1997)
- Living in the Image of God: Jewish Teachings to Perfect the World (1998)
- For the Sake of Heaven and Earth: The New Encounter Between Judaism and Christianity (2004)
- Sage Advice - Commentary on Pirkei Avot (2016)
- Ohr Yisrael and Other Writings By Rabbi Israel Salanter (2024)
- The Triumph of Life: A Narrative Theology of Judaism (2024)
