= Blu Greenberg =

American writer (born 1936)

- בלו גרינברג
- Born: Bluma Genauer; January 21, 1936 (age 90); Seattle, Washington, U.S.
- Education: Brooklyn College (B.A., 1957); Yeshiva University's Teacher's Institute (B.A., 1958); City University of New York (M.A. 1967); Yeshiva University's Bernard Revel Graduate School (M.S.)
- Spouse: Irving Greenberg

Blu Greenberg (Hebrew: בלו גרינברג; born January 21, 1936, Seattle) is an American Orthodox Jewish writer specializing in modern Judaism and women's issues. Her most noted books are On Women and Judaism: A View from Tradition (1981), and Black Bread: Poems, After the Holocaust (1994). Greenberg has worked to bridge Orthodox Judaism and feminism.

== Early life and education ==
Bluma Genauer was born in Seattle to Rabbi Samuel and Sylvia Genauer (nee Genser). Samuel Genauer was born in Czernovitz, Austro-Hungary, and had immigrated to the U.S. at age two. Sylvia Genser was born on the Lower East Side. The couple moved to Seattle following Samuel's rabbinical ordination in 1933. Bluma was the second of three daughters; her older sister, Judy, was born in 1934, and her younger sister, Rena, was born in 1938. Blu grew up in a traditional and loving Orthodox Jewish household. Her father was invested in her and her sister's Jewish studies, and she received "a fine Jewish education, the best a girl could have," learning everything except Talmud studies, as per community tradition.

In 1946, the family moved to Far Rockaway, New York City. Genauer remained in the city for her schooling, graduating from the all-girls Central Yeshiva High School in 1953. From 1955 to 1956, she studied at the Hayim Greenberg Institute for Teachers in Jerusalem with Nechama Leibowitz.

She has a B.A. in political science from Brooklyn College (1957), a B.A. in religious education from Yeshiva University's Teacher's Institute (1958), an MA in clinical psychology from the City University of New York (1967), and an MS in Jewish history from Yeshiva University's Bernard Revel Graduate School.

== Career and activism ==
After earning her master's degree, she taught at the College of Mount St. Vincent beginning in 1969. She took a sabbatical during the 1974-1975 school year, which she spent as a lecturer at the Pardes Institute in Jerusalem. She left Mount St. Vincent after 1976.

=== Feminism ===
Greenberg's feminist leanings arose gradually, through many small moments of realized gender inequality. Such moments included when she was unable to extend her studies in Jerusalem with Nechama Leibowitz, and when only male relatives were allowed to attend her uncle's casket as it left the synagogue. Greenberg says it took her about 10 years to become a feminist. She was inspired by both secular feminists and Jewish feminists from the Reform, Conservative, and Reconstructionist movements. She later noted that although she "did not become one of them, a liberal Jew...their equality agendas for the most part seemed to me to be quite just and proper".

Greenberg's first major feminist decision occurred in February 1973, when she gave the opening address at the first National Jewish Women's Conference, which was held in New York City. The 1970s also marked the start of Greenberg's advocacy for agunot.

In 1981, Greenberg published her first book, On Women and Judaism: A View From Tradition, in which she coined the saying, "Where there's a rabbinic will, there's a halakhic way." The quote, which argues that halakha is not objective, but interpreted based on social norms and needs, became a source of criticism from its first appearance. Also in the 1980s, she tried to build bridges between women of different faiths by helping to set up "Women of Faith" (1980–1992), and by her involvement in the "Dialogue Project" (1989–1994), which sought to unite Jewish and Palestinian women. Greenberg has stated since 1984 that she thinks she will see Orthodox women rabbis in her lifetime.

In 1997 and 1998, she chaired the first and second International Conference on Feminism and Orthodoxy, and she is the founder and the first president of the Jewish Orthodox Feminist Alliance.

She has lectured at universities and to Jewish communities in the United States and elsewhere.

She received the Woman Who Made A Difference award on January 26, 2000, from the American Jewish Congress Commission for Women's Equality during a ceremony at the Israeli Knesset in Jerusalem.

In the 2010s, Greenberg helped develop the International Beit Din (IBD), a United States-based beth din (religious court) which aims to find halakhic solutions to the problems of agunot. As of 2021, the IBD had helped more than 180 women to secure a divorce.

Blu Greenberg's papers and her audiovisual collection are held at the Arthur and Elizabeth Schlesinger Library on the History of Women in America, a research library at the Radcliffe Institute for Advanced Study, Harvard University.

== Personal life ==
Blu married Irving Greenberg in 1957. Greenberg is also a well-known author and professor. The couple had five children, all born in the 1960s. In 2002, one of their sons was in a road accident in Israel and sustained severe brain damage. She and her husband opted to donate his organs, a rare decision in the country.

Born Bluma, she later legally changed her first name to Blu. Greenberg considers herself a Zionist. She and her husband made aliyah to Israel in 2017, and split their time between Israel and the United States.

== Publications ==
=== Books ===
- On Women and Judaism: A View from Tradition. Jewish Publication Society of America. 1981. ISBN 0-8276-0226-X.
- How to Run a Traditional Jewish Household. Fireside. 1985. ISBN 0-671-60270-5.
- Black Bread: Poems, After the Holocaust. Ktav Publishing House. 1994. ISBN 0-88125-490-8.
- Greenberg, Blu; Tarry, Linda (1997). King Solomon and Queen of Sheba. Pitspopany Press. ISBN 9780943706900.

=== Chapters ===
- Mollenkott, V. R., ed. (1987). "Confrontation and Change: Women and the Jewish Tradition". Women of Faith in Dialogue. New York: Crossroad.
- Shapiro, Michael, ed. (1991). "The Feminist Revolution in Orthodox Judaism in America". Divisions between Traditionalism and Liberalism in the American Jewish Community: Cleft or Chasm. Lewiston, NY: E. Mellen Press. pp. 55–78.
- Becher, J., ed. (1991). "Female Sexuality and Bodily Functions in the Jewish Tradition". Women, Religion, and Sexuality. Philadelphia: Trinity Press International.
- Schaalman, Herman E.; Holmgren, Frederick C., eds. (1995). "Hear, O Israel: Law and Love in Deuteronomy". Preaching Biblical Texts: Expositions by Jewish and Christian Scholars. Grand Rapids: William B. Eerdmans Publishing Company.
- Gustafson, Carrie; Juviller, Peter, eds. (1999). "Feminism, Jewish Orthodoxy, and Human Rights: Strange Bedfellows?". Religion and Human Rights. Armonk, New York: M.E. Sharpe.
- Braude, Ann, ed. (2004). "Chapter 16". Transforming the Faiths of our Fathers: Women who Changed American Religion. St. Martin's Press. ISBN 1403964602.

=== Articles ===
- "Equality in Judaism". Hadassah Magazine. December 1973.
- "Abortion--We Need Halachic Creativity". Sh'ma: A Journal of Jewish Responsibility. 5 (81). 1974.
- "Abortion: A Challenge to Halakhah". Judaism: A Quarterly Journal of Jewish Life and Thought. Spring 1976.
- "Feminism: Is It Good for the Jews?". Hadassah Magazine. April 1976.
- Greenberg, Blu (1977). "Jewish Women: Coming of Age". Tradition: A Journal of Orthodox Jewish Thought. 16 (4): 79–94. ISSN 0041-0608. JSTOR 23258423.
- "Beyond "Woman of Valor": How an Orthodox Woman Evolved into a Fervent Feminist". Lilith. Spring–Summer 1982.
- "Will There Be Women Rabbis?". Judaism. 33 (1): 23–33. Winter 1984.
- GREENBERG, BLU (1989-01-01). "'Christian Confrontations with the Holocaust': THE HOLOCAUST AND THE GOSPEL TRUTH*". Holocaust and Genocide Studies. 4 (3): 273–282. doi:10.1093/hgs/4.3.273. ISSN 8756-6583.
- "Is Now the Time for Orthodox Women Rabbis?". Moment: 50–53, 74. December 1992.
- Greenberg, Blu (June 1998). "Orthodox Feminists: What Do Our Numbers Mean?". Shofar: An Interdisciplinary Journal of Jewish Studies. 16 (4): 71–74. doi:10.1353/sho.1998.0061. ISSN 1534-5165.
- "Orthodox Feminism and the Next Century". Sh'ma: A Journal of Jewish Responsibility. 30 (568). 2000.

== See also ==
- Jewish feminism
- Role of women in Judaism
- Jewish Orthodox Feminist Alliance
- Ms. (magazine)#Advertising policy (about a 2008 incident that Greenberg commented on)
