= Jonathan Rosenblatt =

American Modern Orthodox rabbi, teacher, lecturer and counselor (born 1956)

Rabbi Jonathan I. Rosenblatt

Senior Rabbi, Riverdale Jewish Center

Personal life
- Born: August 31, 1956 (age 69)
- Children: Four
- Notable work(s): Bridge-building efforts among Jewish denominations, Support for Oslo peace process
- Education: Johns Hopkins University, Columbia University, Yeshivat Har Etzion, Rabbi Isaac Elchanan Theological Seminary
- Occupation: Rabbi, teacher, lecturer, counselor
- Relatives: Grandson of Rabbi Samuel Rosenblatt, great-grandson of Cantor Yossele Rosenblatt

Religious life
- Religion: Judaism
- Denomination: Modern Orthodox

Jonathan I. Rosenblatt (born August 31, 1956) is an American Modern Orthodox rabbi, teacher, lecturer, and counselor.

== Biography ==
A native of Baltimore, Rosenblatt was the Senior Rabbi of the Riverdale Jewish Center in The Bronx, New York for more than thirty years during which time the RJC became the largest "teaching synagogue" in the country through its Rabbinic and Pre-rabbinic internship programs. Rosenblatt is known for working to bridge the gaps dividing Orthodox, Conservative, Reform and secular Jews, and for actively supporting the Oslo peace process in the Middle East.

Rosenblatt earned a BA and MA from Johns Hopkins University in Comparative Literature and a PhD from Columbia University in Modern British Literature. He studied in Israel at Yeshivat Har Etzion and was ordained by the Rabbi Isaac Elchanan Theological Seminary of Yeshiva University.

Rosenblatt is the great-grandson of cantor Yossele Rosenblatt.

In November 2012, it was reported that Rosenblatt was a candidate to replace Jonathan Sacks as the Chief Rabbi of the United Synagogue. Ultimately the position went to Rabbi Ephraim Mirvis.

In a lecture in his synagogue in February 2014, Rosenblatt said he opposed SAR High School's decision to allow two of its female students to don tefillin (phylacteries) in morning prayers. Tully Harcsztark, the principal of SAR High School, attended the lecture. Samuel Lebens said Rosenblatt delivered a "stunning master class in how to disagree with respect and love." The talk was later uploaded to YouTube.

In June 2014, Rosenblatt was honored at the Riverdale Jewish Center's 60th Anniversary Dinner in celebration of his thirtieth year of service to the congregation.

In his June 11, 2014 speech to Congress, Congressman Eliot Engel (D-NY) said

Anchored by his wife Tzipporah, Rabbi Dr. Jonathan Rosenblatt has been at the helm of the RJC for nearly 30 years, and their guidance can be felt throughout the lives of those whom they have touched...My connection to the Rosenblatts is personal. Rabbi Rosenblatt is a dear friend who was a great comfort to both me and my family after my mother passed away. Rabbi Rosenblatt is truly one of the kindest and most sensitive people whom I have met. He has never proven otherwise, in each and every encounter we have had. The Riverdale Jewish Center is fortunate to have Rabbi Rosenblatt at the helm of the Shul, and I am fortunate to call him my friend.

In November 2014, Rosenblatt's brother-in-law, Moshe Twersky, was murdered by Palestinian terrorists in a synagogue in Jerusalem.

In May 2015, the New York Times published a piece about Rosenblatt's history (in the 1980s and 1990s) of inviting teenage boys to play squash or racquetball often accompanied by sitting in a sauna naked together. There were no allegations of sexual touching or criminal conduct.

On February 25, 2016, Rosenblatt announced his plans to step aside from his role as Senior Rabbi of the Riverdale Jewish Center. A spokesman for him said "He is stepping down because he would like to see the community grow and he thinks in order for that to happen [the synagogue] needs a fresh start." He purportedly took a new position as a counselor at Scarsdale Integrative Medicine in Scarsdale, New York. A person affiliated with Scarsdale Integrative Medicine, Su Y. Heo, said that Rosenblatt actually "was never with [Scarsdale Integrative Medicine]" and that he "was subleasing a place so he can see his own patients . . . . for a month, but he is no longer subleasing with us."
