= Muhammad Hussain (islamist) =

Muhammad Hussain (also known as Antonio Martinez), is a homegrown terrorist from Baltimore, Maryland, who was sentenced on April 6, 2012, to 25 years in federal prison, for attempting the use of a weapon of mass destruction against federal property, in connection with a scheme to attack the armed forces recruiting station in Catonsville, Maryland. He was arrested on December 8, 2010, after the attempt to remotely detonate an explosive device in a vehicle parked in the mentioned Armed Forces recruiting station parking lot.

Martinez spoke about his hate towards the United States of America, including his belief that Muslims were being unfairly targeted by the US and killed by the US military. He expressed his desire to commit jihad by sending the message that American soldiers would be killed, unless the country stopped its "war" against Islam, its war on terror. He also attempted to recruit at least three acquaintances to join into his plot, before an FBI source introduced him to the "Afghani brother", an FBI undercover sting agent.

Martinez (Muhammad Hussain) attempted to recruit a number of loyal people to join the operation, including an individual who he said had the ability to obtain weapons and other deadly devices. All of them later declined the charges, and one of them expressly attempted to dissuade Martinez from committing jihad. He also stated his militant beliefs in postings on his official Facebook profile. Muhammad Hussain pled guilty in January 2011.
