= Douglas McCain =

American ISIL militant (1981–2014)

- Born: January 29, 1981; Chicago, Illinois
- Died: c. August 23, 2014 (aged 33); Syria
- Cause of death: Killed By Free Syrian Army
- Employer: African Spice restaurant
- Organization: Islamic State of Iraq and the Levant

Douglas McAuthur McCain (January 29, 1981 – August 23/24, 2014) was an American jihadist who was killed in Syria in late August 2014 while fighting for the Islamic State of Iraq and the Levant (ISIL). Originally from San Diego, California, McCain converted to Islam in 2004, and traveled to Syria by way of Turkey in early 2014.

He was believed to be the first U.S. citizen to be killed while fighting for ISIL. At the time of McCain's death, there were reportedly dozens more Americans fighting in Syria for Islamic militant groups. Later it was established that the first U.S. citizen killed in the Syrian Civil War was Moner Mohammad Abu-Salha in May 2014. McCain attended the same high school as Troy Kastigar, who also died as an Islamic Jihadist, in 2009 in Somalia. The two may have been roommates.

== Biography ==
McCain was born in Chicago, Illinois. He moved from Chicago to Minnesota before moving again to California after high school. He attended Robbinsdale Cooper High School from 1997 to 1999 before transferring to nearby Robbinsdale Armstrong High School but never graduated. Robbinsdale Cooper was also the school Troy Kastigar attended, and McCain may have lived in Kastigar's house for a while, in 2000 and 2001. He loved basketball, was a fan of the Chicago Bulls, and was, at the time, an aspiring rapper. McCain had a criminal record with minor charges including traffic violations, disorderly conduct, and providing false names to police officers. He converted to Islam in 2004. He traveled to Europe, and by 2013 returned to San Diego where, according to one report, he worked at a mosque, while another report states he worked at a Somali restaurant and frequented a mosque.

According to a former classmate he was eager to talk about Islam and his conversion, but remained respectful of others' beliefs and was not radical. He was active on social media, with the handle "Duale Khalid" on Twitter and "Duale ThaslaveofAllah" on Facebook.

McCain was killed in fights with the Free Syrian Army in the weekend of August 23/24, 2014, and his body was found with $800 in cash and a US passport.
