= 2011 Manhattan terrorism plot =

Bomb plot in New York City, United States

- Location: Manhattan, New York
- Date: Suspects arrested on May 11, 2011
- Attack type: Plot to bomb a synagogue and other targets in Manhattan
- Deaths: 0
- Injuries: 0
- Motive: Islamic extremism; Antisemitism

The 2011 Manhattan terrorism plot was a conspiracy by two Muslim Arab-Americans to bomb various targets in New York City, United States. According to authorities, Ahmed Ferhani and Mohamed Mamdouh planned to attack an unspecified synagogue, possibly a church, and the Empire State Building. Law enforcement arrested the two suspects in a sting operation on May 11, 2011. The plot was motivated primarily by "hatred of infidels and anti-semitism," according to the authorities.

In December 2012, Ferhani pleaded guilty to terrorism conspiracy and terrorism-related weapons possession charges and was sentenced to 10 years in state prison. Mamdouh pleaded guilty and was sentenced to 5 years in state prison in April 2013.

== Plot ==
On May 12, 2011, New York City law enforcement officials announced that two suspects, Ahmed Ferhani and Mohamed Mamdouh, had been arrested for trying to purchase weapons, including three pistols and hand grenades, as part of a terror plot to attack an unspecified Manhattan synagogue. New York City Mayor Michael Bloomberg said both suspects wanted to attack a "major synagogue". Mr. Ferhani is to also have expressed an interest in blowing up a church in Queens and the Empire State Building. Prior to their arrest, the two men had already obtained some guns. Ferhani allegedly was trying to sell drugs to fund the attacks.

According to law enforcement officials, this was the thirteenth plot thwarted against the city since the September 11 attacks.

== Arrest ==
An undercover detective had been investigating one of the suspects, Ahmed Ferhani, for several months. In October 2010, Ferhani was arrested on a robbery charge in Manhattan, when the detective overhead Ferhani saying he hated Jews and was upset with the way Muslims, especially Palestinians, were treated around the world. According to New York City Police Commissioner Raymond Kelly, Ferhani once said, "They're treating us like dogs." Ferhani also told the detective about "his intent to participate in jihad" and that "he would become a martyr." Eventually Ferhani brought Mamdouh into the plot, who prosecutors said is on tape saying he hated Jews.

According to Manhattan District Attorney Cyrus Vance, the authorities decided to act because Ferhani's "plans became bigger and more violent with every passing week". In several meetings with the undercover detective, Ferhani discussed the idea of attacking a synagogue, even suggesting disguising himself as a worshiping Jew so he could infiltrate the synagogue and leave a bomb inside.

On May 11, 2011, the NYPD set up an arms deal as a sting operation on Manhattan's West Side. In the deal, one of the undercover officers handed Ferhani a bag containing three handguns, three boxes of ammo and an inert grenade. Once Ferhani placed the bag in the trunk of his car, the police swarmed and arrested him, as well as Mamdouh, who was nearby.

== Trial ==
On the evening of May 12, 2011, the two suspects were arraigned in a Manhattan courtroom on terrorism charges. Prosecutor Margaret Gandy listed the charges and evidence, and the two were detained without bail. According to The Wall Street Journal, "The arrests mark the first time New York state terrorism charges, rather than federal, will be used against individuals suspected in a terror plot." According to a source quoted by The Wall Street Journal, NYPD detectives brought the case to the Joint Terrorism Task Force, which decided not to take part due to concerns that the case was not strong enough to secure a conviction. A New York State grand jury decided to indict the suspects on lesser charges, and declined to indict them on the more serious charges such as second-degree conspiracy.

At trial in March 2012, one of Ferhani's attorneys, Elizabeth Fink, argued that he had been entrapped by law enforcement authorities.

In a December 2012 plea bargain, Ferhani pleaded guilty to terrorism conspiracy and terrorism-related weapons possession charges and was sentenced to ten years in prison.

Mamdouh pleaded guilty to charges, including conspiracy as terrorism. On 26 April 2013, he was sentenced to 5 years in state prison.

== Perpetrators ==
The two suspects, 26-year-old Ahmed Ferhani and 20-year-old Mohamed Mamdouh, are both Arab-Muslim immigrants from North Africa that live in East Elmhurst, Queens. Ferhani, considered the ringleader of the plot, is from Algeria, from where he and his parents were granted asylum some 10 years prior. He was under review for possible deportation for failing to show up at immigration hearings where he would have been questioned about his arrest record. Mamdouh, the accomplice, is a U.S. citizen from Morocco.

At the time of attack, Ferhani was unemployed but previously worked as a cosmetic sales clerk at Saks Fifth Avenue in Midtown Manhattan. According to one of his friends and former co-worker at Saks, he had dreams of being a model or actor and moving out to California. The friend also said Ferhani was not particularly religious, drank alcohol and was an aspiring hip-hop performer. Ferhani also had been arrested six times previously, including an October 2010 robbery of a prostitute. All the cases were eventually dismissed and sealed.

=== Motive ===
A high-ranking NYPD terrorism official said that Ferhani and Mamdouh represented a new kind of threat: "They weren't waiting for guidance from [Osama] bin Laden, they weren't looking to go overseas. They were confident they could do it themselves. These guys were also no religious experts. They weren't driven by religion. It's really more politics and anti-Semitism."

== See also ==
- 2005 Los Angeles bomb plot
- 2009 Bronx terrorism plot
- 2000 New York terror attack
- Islamic extremism in the United States
- List of attacks on Jewish institutions in the United States
