= Riverdale Temple =

Reform synagogue in the Bronx, New York

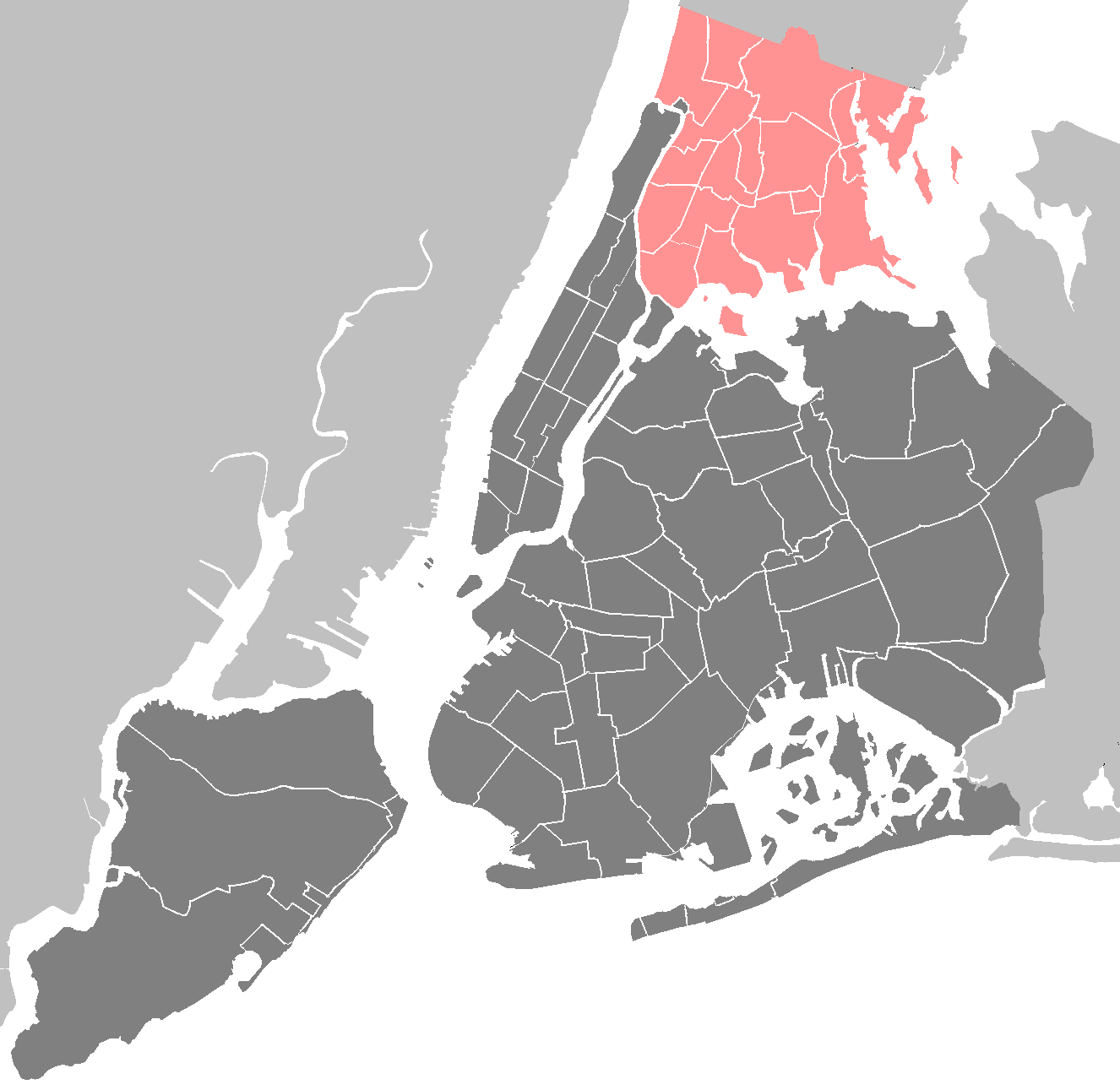
- Location in the Bronx, New York City

Religion
- Affiliation: Reform Judaism
- Ecclesiastical or organizational status: Synagogue
- Leadership: Rabbi Thomas Gardner; Rabbi Judith S. Lewis (Emerita); Rabbi Stephen D. Franklin (Emeritus)
- Status: Active

Location
- Location: 4545 Independence Avenue, Riverdale, the Bronx, New York City, New York 10471
- Country: United States
- Interactive map of Riverdale Temple
- Coordinates: 40°53′31″N 73°54′47″W

Architecture
- Type: Synagogue
- Established: 1947 (as a congregation)

Website
- riverdaletemple.org

The Riverdale Temple is a Reform Jewish congregation and synagogue located at 4545 Independence Avenue, in the Riverdale neighborhood of the Bronx, New York City, New York, United States. The congregation was founded in 1947.

In 2009, the rabbi was Judith S. Lewis. In July 2015, Rabbi Lewis retired and was succeeded by Rabbi Thomas Gardner.

== Terrorism plot ==
In 2009, a group of four American Muslims planned to blow up the temple. After a six-week trial, the four were convicted on conspiracy to use weapons of mass destruction and conspiracy to acquire and use anti-aircraft missiles. In 2011, the men were sentenced in the District Court to 25 years in prison each. On appeal to the Federal Court, their sentences were upheld. In July 2023, a judge ordered compassionate release for three of the four men, with time served, being eleven years. The judge declared their 25-year sentences ‘unduly harsh and unjust’.

On May 30, 2009, New York Governor David Paterson announced he would give the Riverdale Jewish Center and the Riverdale Temple $25,000 each to improve their security. The money came from the Department of Homeland Security (DHS) and primarily involved the installation of alarms and surveillance equipment.
