= 2015 Chattanooga shootings =

Spree shooting in Tennessee, U.S.

- The Armed Forces Career Center cordoned off with police tape after the shooting

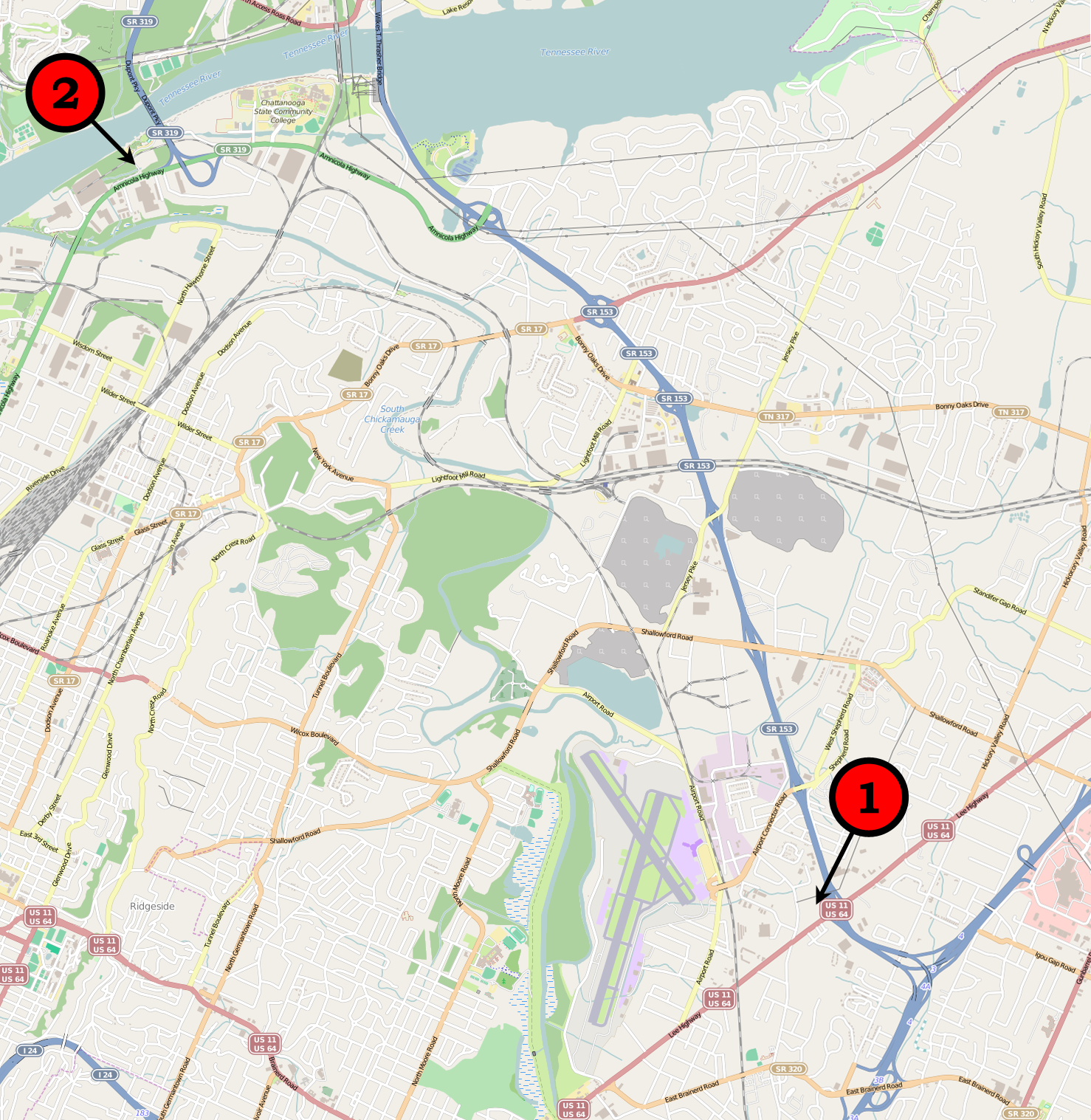
- Map of the shootings in Chattanooga, Tennessee
- Location: Military installations in Chattanooga, Tennessee, US
- Date: July 16, 2015 c. 10:45 – c. 11:15 a.m.
- Target: U.S. military recruitment and reserve centers
- Attack type: Mass shooting, mass murder, spree shooting, lone-wolf terrorism
- Weapons: AK-74 semi-automatic rifle; Saiga-12 shotgun; 9mm Smith & Wesson handgun
- Deaths: 6 (including the perpetrator)
- Injuries: 2
- Perpetrator: Muhammad Youssef Abdulazeez (Note: His name is given as Mohammad Youssuf Abdulazeez (محمد يوسف عبدالعزيز) in some sources, including his high school yearbook. Abdulazeez was born as Mohammad Youssuf Saeed Hajj or Mohammad Youssuf Saeed Haj-Ali (Arabic:محمد يوسف سعيد حج علي), but his father changed his name that year to Abdulazeez shortly after his birth.)
- Motive: Islamist terrorism, inspired by foreign terrorist organizations

On July 16, 2015, 24-year-old Muhammad Youssef Abdulazeez opened fire on two military installations in Chattanooga, Tennessee, United States. He first committed a drive-by shooting at a recruiting center, then traveled to a U.S. Navy Reserve center and continued firing, before being killed in an exchange of gunfire with the police. Four Marines died on the spot. A Navy sailor, a Marine recruiter, and a police officer were wounded; the sailor died from his injuries two days later.

On December 16, following an investigation, former Federal Bureau of Investigation (FBI) director James B. Comey said that the shootings were "motivated by foreign terrorist organization propaganda."

== Shootings ==
The shootings began shortly after 10:30 a.m. at the Armed Forces Career Center in a strip mall located on Lee Highway. The Center recruited personnel for branches of the United States military, including the U.S. Army, the U.S. Air Force, and the Tennessee National Guard. There, Abdulazeez, using his AK-74, fired 30 to 45 shots into the office from inside a silver rental Ford Mustang convertible, wounding a U.S. Marine. He then escaped and led members of the Chattanooga Police Department on a seven-mile pursuit. At the time of the first shooting, only seven people, including the wounded Marine, were inside the recruiting center.

Abdulazeez drove seven miles (11 km) to a U.S. Navy Reserve center on Amnicola Highway in Chattanooga, where he rammed his vehicle through a security gate. He drove to one of the center's buildings, where the Inspector-Instructor staff of Mike Battery, 3rd Battalion, 14th Marines and sailors were working.

Abdulazeez first fired at it, then charged inside and continued firing, fatally wounding a U.S. Navy sailor. Abdulazeez then exited the building through the back and entered a fenced motor pool area, where he shot several Marines. Three to five minutes after the second shooting began, he reentered the building, where he fired upon responding police officers. He was eventually fatally shot by five police officers (Officers Keven Flanagan, Jeff Lancaster, Sean O'Brien, Lucas Timmons, Grover Wilson III) outside the facility.

=== Aftermath ===
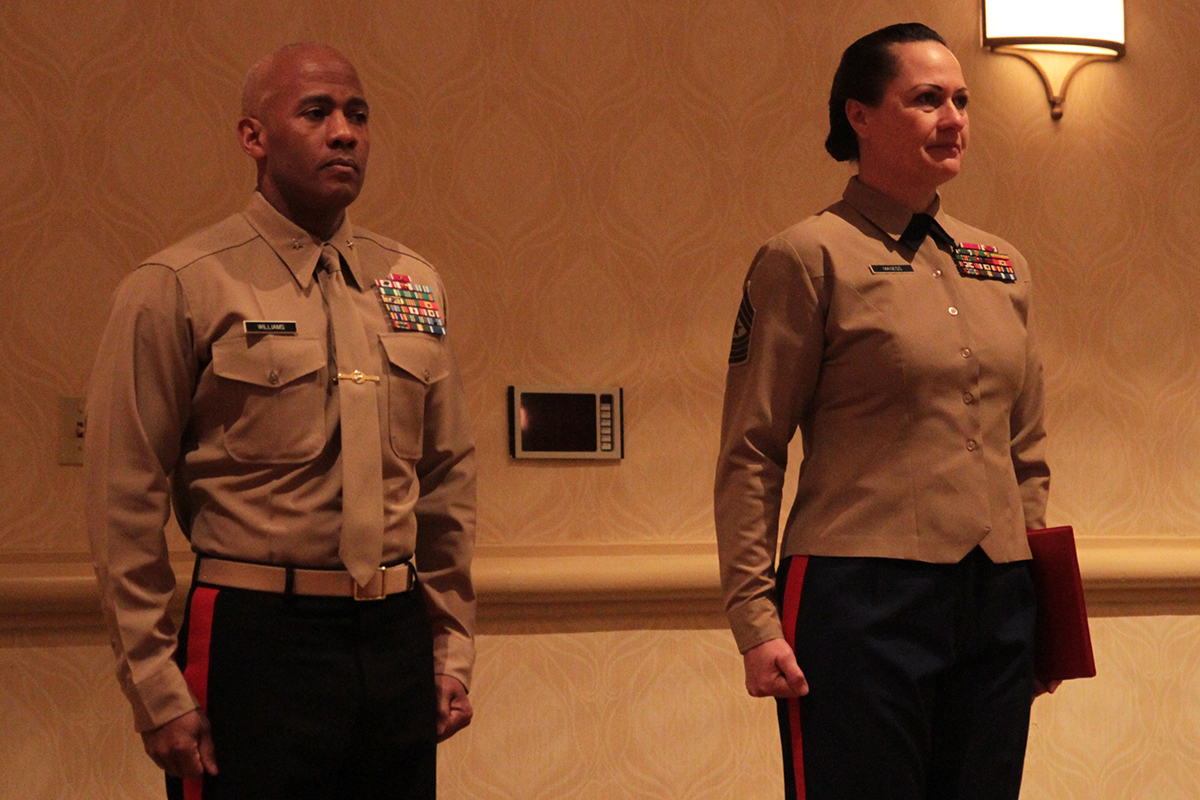
Marine and Chattanooga shooting victim receives Purple Heart Medal

The shootings spanned a thirty-minute period. Around 100 rounds were fired by Abdulazeez. Lock-downs were put into place near the sites of the shootings.

After the shootings, officials said that Abdulazeez was carrying a semi-automatic rifle and a 9mm handgun. A Saiga-12 12-gauge semi-automatic shotgun was also recovered from his car. He was also wearing a vest that could hold extra ammunition. An AR-15 semi-automatic rifle was seized at Abdulazeez's home by police.

Investigators discovered a 9mm Glock handgun that may have been privately owned by one of the slain Marines and are determining if it was used against Abdulazeez during the shootings. It was also determined that the reserve center's commanding officer used a personal firearm against Abdulazeez.

== Victims ==
Five people, excluding the gunman, died in the shootings. They included four U.S. Marines who died at the scene and one U.S. Navy sailor who died at a hospital two days later. All of them were shot at the U.S. Navy Reserve center, one inside a building and the other four at a nearby motor pool area. The victims all attempted to distract the gunman, returned fire, and assisted people in climbing a fence to safety. Some of the victims died while returning fire at Abdulazeez, providing cover for a larger group of potential victims who were escaping over a fence. They were identified as:

| Name | Age | Hometown | Branch | Rank |
|---|---|---|---|---|
| Carson A. Holmquist | 25 | Grantsburg, Wisconsin | Marine Corps | Sergeant |
| Randall Smith | 26 | Paulding, Ohio | Navy | Logistics specialist second class |
| Thomas J. Sullivan | 40 | Springfield, Massachusetts | Marine Corps | Gunnery sergeant |
| Squire K. "Skip" Wells | 21 | Marietta, Georgia | Marine Corps | Lance corporal |
| David A. Wyatt | 37 | Russellville, Arkansas | Marine Corps | Staff sergeant |

In addition, two other people were wounded. They were Sergeant DeMonte Cheeley, a Marine recruiter who was shot in the leg, treated, and released; and Dennis Pedigo Jr., a police sergeant who was shot in the ankle.

== Perpetrator ==
Muhammad Youssef Abdulazeez (September 5, 1990 – July 16, 2015), a resident of Hixson, Tennessee, was identified as the gunman.

=== Background ===
Abdulazeez, a naturalized US citizen, was born in Kuwait on September 5, 1990, to Palestinian-Jordanian parents. Abdulazeez held a temporary Jordanian passport as a travel document (commonly issued to Palestinians by the Jordanian government); Jordanian authorities emphasized that Abdulazeez was not a Jordanian citizen.

Abdulazeez migrated to the US with his family in 1996 and became a US citizen in 2003. According to The Washington Post, both of Abdulazeez's parents were self-described in their divorce proceedings "as natives of 'the State of Palestine'" and they "maintained a strict, conservative Muslim lifestyle." According to a law enforcement official, Abdulazeez's father had been placed on a terrorist watchlist and investigated many years before the shootings for giving money to an organization with possible terrorist connections. The father was questioned while on a trip abroad but was eventually removed from the watchlist. He was not charged with any crime and the information gained in that investigation revealed nothing about his son. During the Second Intifada, Abdulazeez, then fifteen, traveled with his father to Jamma'in, the village in the West Bank where the father was born, with the goal of acquiring a Palestinian ID.

Abdulazeez graduated from Red Bank High School. He earned an electrical engineering degree from the University of Tennessee at Chattanooga in 2012 and learned to manage electrical power systems as an intern with the Tennessee Valley Authority. On May 20, 2013, he began working as an engineer at the Perry Nuclear Generating Station in North Perry, Ohio, but was let go ten days later after failing a drug test. According to a spokesperson for FirstEnergy, which runs the station, Abdulazeez worked and received general training at an administrative office building only, and did not have access to sensitive information. In the three months prior to the shootings, Abdulazeez was employed with Superior Essex as a supervisor for its Franklin office.

Abdulazeez frequented a gun range with his co-workers.

=== Mental instability and substance abuse ===
Abdulazeez had drug and alcohol problems, and his family tried to place him in a rehabilitation program. The New York Times reported that limits on the family's health insurance coverage "thwarted their plan to have him go into rehab." The investigation after the shooting revealed that Abdulazeez "had serious psychological problems."

According to a family representative, Abdulazeez was abusing sleeping pills, opioids, painkillers, and marijuana along with alcohol. He had also been thousands of dollars in debt and was planning to file for bankruptcy. In 2012 or 2013, Abdulazeez began therapy for his drug and alcohol abuse. He had also received treatment for depression and often stopped taking his medication. Following the shootings, Abdulazeez's parents claimed that their son had been suffering from depression. According to a source that was provided by CNN, Abdulazeez was suffering from bipolar disorder.

=== Abdulazeez's travel and actions preceding the shooting ===
Abdulazeez did not attract the attention of the FBI before the shootings. Abdulazeez traveled to Jordan five times. His first trip was in 2003 and the last trip was between April and November 2014, when Abdulazeez visited a maternal uncle. This last visit was arranged by Abdulazeez's family, who wanted him to get away from friends they believed were bad influences on him. Abdulazeez also traveled to Kuwait in 2008.

Accounts on the length of Abdulazeez's stay with his uncle vary, ranging from two to seven months. Abdulazeez reportedly led a solitary life in Jordan.

Abdulazeez's sole known previous contact with law enforcement was an April 20, 2015 arrest for driving under the influence of alcohol (DUI). A family spokesman said that the arrest triggered a severe increase in his depression.

After his 2014 visit to Jordan, Abdulazeez told friends that Jordan, Qatar, and Saudi Arabia ought to have sent more help to Hamas during the 2014 Israel–Gaza conflict. They also noted a change in his behavior and that he made critical statements against the Islamic State of Iraq and the Levant (ISIL).

In the months before the shooting, Abdulazeez regularly attended Friday prayers at a mosque. and was thought to have written a blog post in which he urged study of the Quran to give meaning to life. According to his family, Abdulazeez had searched online about martyrdom, and had been wondering whether becoming a martyr would absolve him of his sins. On July 20, several writings belonging to Abdulazeez, dating as far back as 2013, were discovered. In them, he wrote about having suicidal thoughts after losing his job due to his drug use and his desire to "becom[e] a martyr". Authorities searching his computer found that he owned CDs and had downloaded videos by al-Qaeda recruiter Anwar al-Awlaki. An FBI spokesman stated that "[t]here are some pretty radicalized thoughts" in the writings.

None of the writings laid out plans for an attack or spelled out a motive, however. The motivation is surmised from the fact that on July 11, Abdulazeez bought ammunition at a Wal-Mart store. On July 13, he wrote long diary entries, describing life as a kind of prison and warning, "Don't be fooled by your desires, this life is short and bitter and the opportunity to submit to Allah may pass you by." He also wrote that people mistakenly thought that the Sahaba (companions of the Prophet) were priests "living in monasteries" but that this was untrue. The truth, he wrote, is that "[e]veryone one of them [sic] fought jihad for the sake of Allah. Everyone one of them [sic] had to make sacrifices in their lives." Hours before the shooting, he texted an Islamic verse to a friend that read, "Whosoever shows enmity to a friend of mine, then I have declared war against him."

== Criminal investigation ==
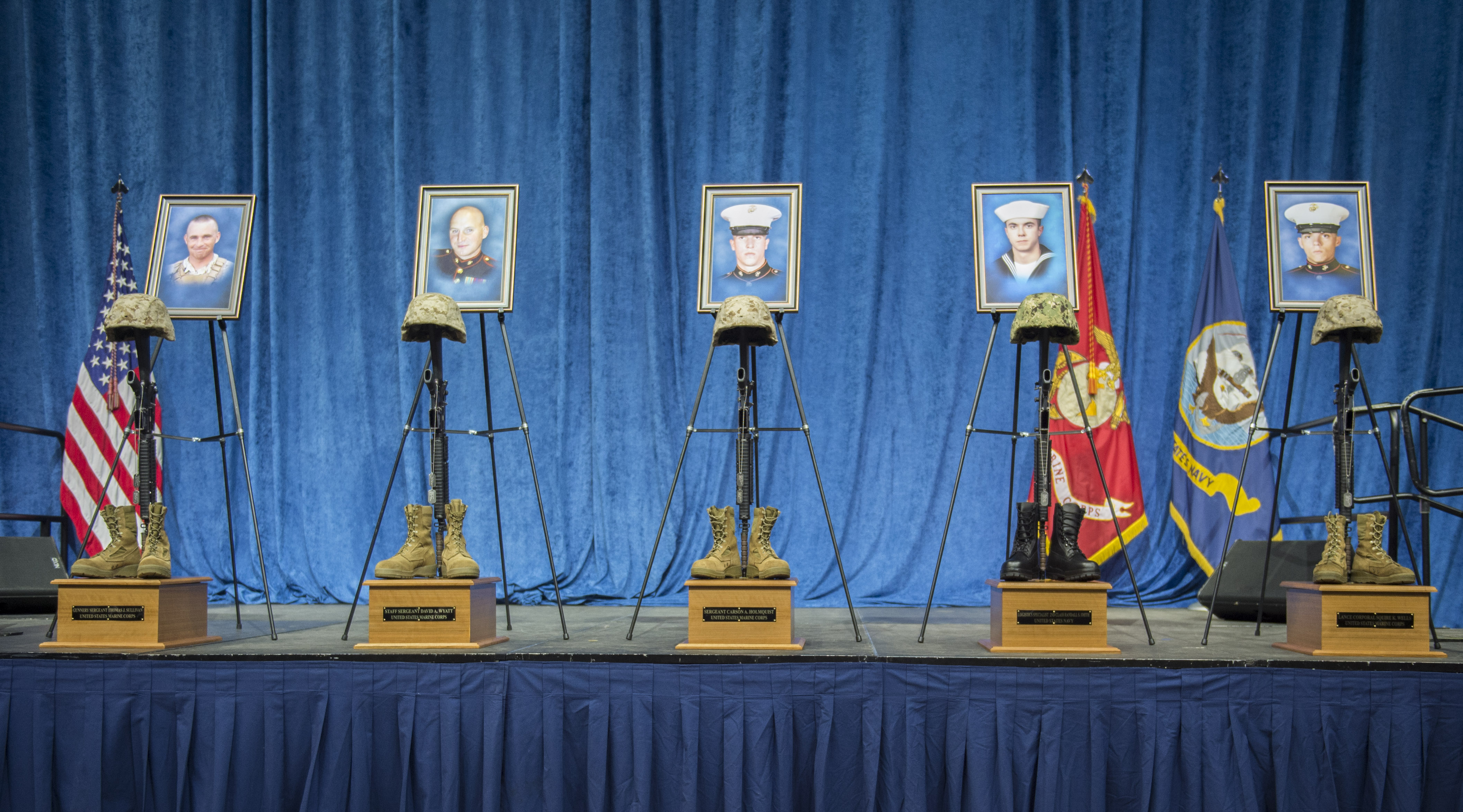
Battle crosses for fallen service members on stage during the memorial at McKenzie Arena at the University of Tennessee Chattanooga. (19979837504)

An official participating in the investigation told The New York Times there was no evidence that Abdulazeez was in contact with any social media recruiters working for ISIL, explaining, "This case appears to be much more like the old model, where he was interested in radical Islam and sought to learn more about it online by looking at videos and readings."

The shooting was investigated by the FBI as a jihad case from the outset. The Naval Criminal Investigative Service was also involved in the investigation. On July 23, 2015, in the immediate aftermath of the attack, FBI special agent Ed Reinhold stated that the attack was being treated as the work of "a homegrown violent extremist" and that the FBI is exploring the idea that Abdulazeez was self-radicalized. The following month, Secretary of Defense Ash Carter said that investigators might never be able to determine "what combination of disturbed mind, violent extremism and hateful ideology was at work." In November 2015, FBI Director James B. Comey said, "We're still trying to make sure we understand Abdulazeez, his motivations and associations, in a really good way."

On December 16, 2015, Comey said that the FBI investigation had concluded that "there is no doubt that [Abdulazeez] was inspired, motivated by foreign terrorist organization propaganda." Comey added that it was difficult to determine which specific terrorist group or groups inspired Abdulazeez. On the same day, Secretary of the Navy Ray Mabus announced that the Purple Heart would be conferred upon the victims of the shootings.

According to professor Charles Kurzman, the shootings were part of a "shift away from large-scale elaborate attempts to use weapons of mass destruction or other high-profile plots — the hallmark of al-Qaida and its affiliates — toward a lower tech do-it-yourself strategy" propagated by ISIL and other groups. President Barack Obama expressed similar thoughts in a December 2015 speech, saying:

The terrorist threat has evolved into a new phase. As we've become better at preventing complex, multifaceted attacks like 9/11, terrorists turned to less-complicated acts of violence like the mass shootings that are all too common in our society. It is this type of attack that we saw at Fort Hood in 2009, in Chattanooga earlier this year and now in San Bernardino.

== Reactions ==
=== Leaders ===
- President Barack Obama called the event "heartbreaking" and publicly expressed his condolences to the families of the victims in a statement. On July 21, he ordered all flags at the White House, federal buildings and U.S. embassies overseas to be flown at half-staff.
- Vice President Joe Biden, speaking at a memorial for the victims, expressed his condolences to their families and called the gunman a "perverted jihadist."
- Secretary of the Navy Ray Mabus called the shootings "devastating and senseless" and offered his condolences to the families of the victims. He promised an investigation into future vulnerabilities.
- U.S. Marine Corps Major General Paul W. Brier, Commanding General of the 4th Marine Division, spoke at the nationally televised press conference held in Chattanooga on 22 July 2015. He praised the Marines and Sailors who risked their lives to help others and stop the gunman. “The legacy that day is one of valor.” "'I can tell you that our Marines reacted the way you would expect,' the major general said. 'Rapidly going from room to room, they got their fellow Marines to safety. Once they had gotten to safety, some willingly ran back into the fight.'""'They will be missed but never forgotten,' Brier said of the four Marines and one Navy petty officer who died.”
- Tennessee Governor Bill Haslam said, "I join all Tennesseans in being both sickened and saddened by this."
- Chattanooga Mayor Andy Berke called the shootings "a nightmare for the City of Chattanooga."
- Battery Commander Major Michael Abrams, speaking at the memorial service, expressed that he was "deeply proud" of how the marines and sailors responded to the shootings, saying, "In the chaos of that moment, they were selfless in their efforts to take care of one another, and they acted with unquestionable courage."

=== Muslim organizations ===
Muslim and mosque leaders across Tennessee condemned the shootings. Paul Galloway, representing the American Muslim Advisory Council, said that Muslims in Tennessee "express our deepest condolences to the victims and their families. Terrorists seek to divide our society, and we pray that all Americans will stand together united against their wanton violence and hatred."

The National Executive Director of Council on American–Islamic Relations, Nihad Awad, said, "Such inexcusable acts of violence must be repudiated by Americans of all faiths and backgrounds." The National Vice-President of the Ahmadiyya Muslim Community USA stated, "While we do not yet know what motivated this man, we urge calm, defer to authorities to justly resolve this, and pray for the departed U.S. Marines."

=== Security measures ===
In the wake of the shootings, Defense Secretary Ashton Carter and Homeland Security Secretary Jeh Johnson called for increased security measures at federal facilities out of caution. On July 29, Carter released a two-page memorandum directing military commanders and civilian leaders to develop new security plans and measures, including "the option of additional armed personnel". He put an emphasis of added security at small, unguarded facilities such as the two military installations attacked by Abdulazeez.

On August 15, during a speech at a memorial for the victims, he called for a review of domestic security procedures for military installations across the country. On August 29, the Navy launched an official investigation looking into possible security changes, communications with law enforcement and emergency responders, and on-site personnel response. The investigation is headed by a twenty-person team, which submitted a 41-page report on September 26. Though the Marine Corps ruled out arming recruiters as a security measure since most of their job is to interact with the public, officials have begun developing other options.

Senator Ron Johnson (R-WI) announced his intention to introduce a bill that would end the ban on firearms being carried in military installations. The Navy made plans to station armed guards at all 70 reserve centers not located on military bases and is also considering providing armed protection for recruiting centers.

In August 2015, General Max Hastings of the Tennessee National Guard announced that he has made the decision to allow firearms carry permit holders carry their firearms while in uniform. Tennessee State Representative Tilman Goins pointed out that many national guard members were under 21 years of age, and at that time, Tennessee did not issue permits to citizens under that age. Representative Goins wrote and passed legislation that would lower the carry permit age for national guard members and veterans, and active military who were 18 or older.

On July 18, two days after the shootings, the governors of Florida, Texas, and Indiana ordered the arming of National Guardsmen at military offices and other facilities, along with the installation of bulletproof glass and more efficient video surveillance equipment. Louisiana, Oklahoma, and Arkansas followed suit the next day. Utah Governor Gary Herbert also announced that the state would "explore additional ways to protect our men and women serving in the Armed Forces". In 2014, Utah had passed legislation allowing soldiers at National Guard facilities to carry weapons.

== See also ==
- 2022 Chattanooga shooting
- 2007 Fort Dix attack plot
- 2009 Fort Hood shooting
- 2009 Little Rock recruiting office shooting
- 2013 Washington Navy Yard shooting
- 2015 Curtis Culwell Center attack
- 2016 Orlando nightclub shooting
- Gun violence in the United States
- 3rd Battalion 14th Marines
