= Riverdale Jewish Center =

Orthodox synagogue in the Bronx, New York

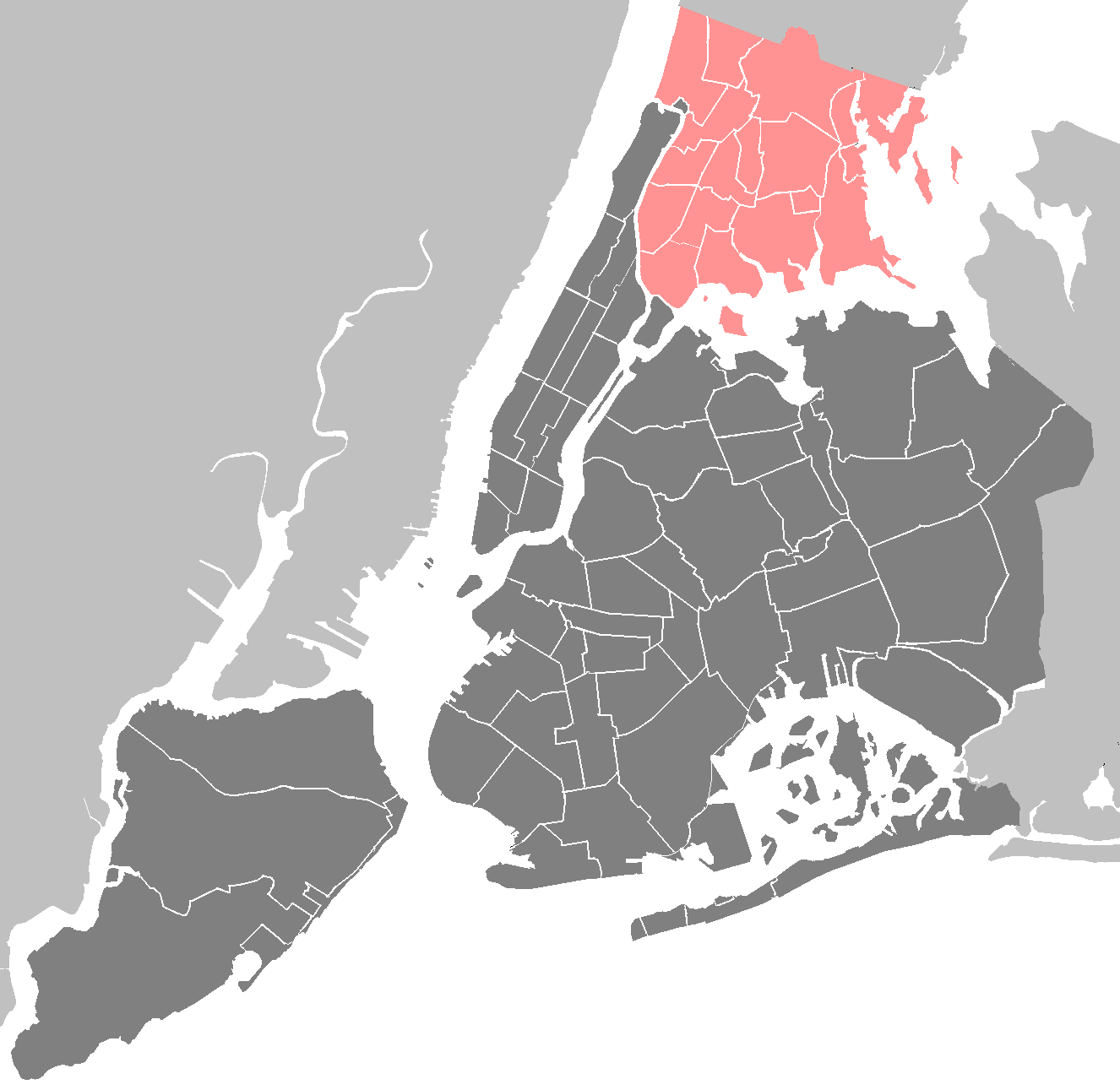
- Location in the Bronx

Religion
- Affiliation: Modern Orthodox Judaism
- Ecclesiastical or organizational status: Synagogue
- Leadership: Rabbi Dovid Zirkind; Rabbi Tzvi Benoff (Assistant Rabbi)
- Status: Active

Location
- Location: 3700 Independence Avenue, Riverdale, The Bronx, New York City, New York 10463
- Country: United States
- Interactive map of Riverdale Jewish Center
- Coordinates: 40°53′17″N 73°54′46″W

Architecture
- Founder: Yeshiva University
- Established: 1954 (as a congregation)

Website
- rjconline.org

The Riverdale Jewish Center, abbreviated as RJC, is a Modern Orthodox synagogue located at 3700 Independence Avenue, in the Riverdale neighborhood of the Bronx, New York City, New York, United States.

== History ==
The synagogue was founded by the Communal Services Division of Yeshiva University and has always identified itself as a bastion of that institution.

Its rabbis have included its founder Jacob Sable, Irving Greenberg, Yehezkel Hartmann, Joshua Shmidman, Abner Weiss, and Jonathan Rosenblatt.

In May 2015, the New York Times claimed that Rosenblatt had a history—in the 1980s and 1990s—of inviting teenage boys to play squash or racquetball, often accompanied by sitting in a sauna naked together. There were no allegations of sexual touching or criminal conduct, and Rosenblatt retained his position as rabbi of the RJC.

The senior rabbi is Rabbi Dovid Zirkind, and the assistant rabbi is Rabbi Tzvi Benoff.

The charter school Atmosphere Academy uses part of the building for 8th-grade classes during the week.

== Attacks on the synagogue ==
In the 2009 New York City bomb plot the New York City Police Department foiled a plot by American Muslims to bomb the synagogue. On May 30, 2009, New York Governor David Paterson announced he would give the Center and the Riverdale Reform Temple $25,000 each to improve their security.

In 2021, the synagogue was subject to vandalism, including rocks thrown through the synagogue's windows.

== Notable members ==
- Irving Greenberg
- Joseph Lieberman
