= Troy Kastigar =

- Born: March 16, 1981; Hennepin County, Minnesota
- Died: September 2009 (aged 28); Somalia
- Organization: (Al-Shabaab (militant group)) al-Shabaab

Troy Matthew Kastigar (March 16, 1981 – September 2009) was an American jihadist who fought for the al-Shabaab militia in Somalia, and was killed there in 2009. Like Douglas McCain (another American jihadist, killed in Syria in 2014), he was born in the US and attended Robbinsdale Cooper High School in New Hope, Minnesota, and the two may have been roommates at one time.

== Biography ==
Kastigar was born in Hennepin County, Minnesota. He and his younger brother, Thomas, were raised by their mother, who was single. He took karate lessons in Golden Valley, Minnesota, when he was ten and earned a black belt; his instructor remembered him as "very respectful, polite, upbeat, positive". Police reports listed him as white, though his mother claimed Native American heritage. Kastigar attended Robbinsdale Cooper High School from 1997 to 1999, and dropped out in February 1999. Robbinsdale Cooper was also the school Douglas McCain attended; McCain may have lived in Kastigar's house between 2000 and 2001, and the two played basketball together at the local community center, sometimes with a group of Somali men. Kastigar, like McCain, had a criminal record with minor offenses including "charges of disorderly conduct, traffic violations and instances in which they [he and McCain] gave false names to police officers".

He converted to Islam after high school and adopted the name Abdirahman. He left Minneapolis in November 2008, apparently with a group of Somali men he had met in Minnesota: Al-Shabaab was reportedly recruiting heavily in the Twin Cities area. Kastigar was killed in September 2009 in Somalia, according to a 2011 report; he was the fifth or sixth person from Minnesota to die there, and the first US citizen of that group. In August 2013 al-Shabaab released a promotional video, "Minnesota's Martyrs: The Path to Paradise", in which Kastigar said he was living in "the real Disneyland", but that video also showed his corpse.
