= 2007 Fort Dix attack plot =

Planned attack on the US military in New Jersey

- Location: Fort Dix, New Jersey, U.S.
- Date: Planned; never executed; arrested May 8, 2007
- Target: U.S. military personnel at Fort Dix
- Attack type: Conspiracy
- Deaths: 0
- Injuries: 0

The 2007 Fort Dix attack plot involved a group of six radical Muslim individuals who were found guilty of conspiring to stage an attack against U.S. Military personnel stationed at Fort Dix, New Jersey.

The men were arrested by the Federal Bureau of Investigation (FBI) on May 8, 2007, and were prosecuted in federal court in October 2008. On December 22, 2008, five were found guilty of conspiracy to commit murder in their intentions to kill U.S. military personnel; four received life sentences, while one received 33 years in prison. The remaining member was thought to have had a minor role in the plot and was sentenced to five years in prison for weapons offenses.

Critics accuse the FBI of entrapment, saying the FBI informants created the conspiracy. The FBI used two foreign informants who were in the United States illegally with criminal records to befriend the men. These informants received payment and help with their legal residency status. In addition, they point to issues such as the ineffective assistance of their lawyers, the lack of impartiality of the judge, and the absence of explicit evidence of participation in the alleged plot. Mahmoud Omar, an FBI informant and key witness in the case later claimed that the Dukas were "people and good" and said the brothers were innocent. Due to the case, the three Duka brothers, Shnewer, and Abdullahu have been referred to as the Fort Dix Five.

== Suspects ==
- Dritan Duka (age 28), Shain Duka (26) and Eljvir Duka (23) ethnic Albanians from Debar, currently North Macedonia. The Duka family entered the United States illegally through Mexico in October 1984. In 1989, the father Ferik Duka applied for asylum with the Immigration and Naturalization Service and acknowledged the family's illegal entry into the country.
- Mohamad Ibrahim Shnewer (22), Eljvir Duka's brother-in-law, a Palestinian cab driver from Jordan, was a naturalized United States citizen.
- Serdar Tatar, born in Turkey, worked at his father's pizzeria.
- Agron Abdullahu, ethnic Albanian from Kosovo, said to have provided weaponry instruction to the group. He worked at a ShopRite supermarket in Buena Vista Township, New Jersey.

== Background ==
In the late 1980s, the Dukas abandoned life in Macedonia and moved to the United States as illegal immigrants and settled in Brooklyn in New York. The Dukas brothers did not adapt to the school and gradually gave up their studies and started to work and to live on the streets. During these periods they were detained numerous times for disorderly conduct and possession of marijuana. Dissatisfied with the situation, Dukas' parents moved into a small apartment in Cherry Hill, New Jersey where the brothers began to attend a mosque. Once established, the Duka family opened a small restaurant and then opened a roofing business. Mohamad Shnewer worked as a taxi driver and grew up with the Dukas in Brooklyn, his sister was engaged to Eljivir. Sedar Tatar worked at his father's pizzeria and later went to work at 7-Eleven in Philadelphia.

== Context ==
The six men took a trip to the Poconos, where they allegedly practiced firing "semi-automatic weapons" at a shooting range in Gouldsboro, Pennsylvania. The shooting range, at Pennsylvania State Game Land 127, is operated by the Commonwealth of Pennsylvania. A group of ten men had recorded video footage of themselves shooting weapons and shouting Allahu Akbar ("God is great"). They had also recorded themselves skiing, playing paintball, and riding horses on their trip to Poconos. The defense argued it was not a terrorist training video.

On January 31, 2006, the men took the video to the Circuit City in Mount Laurel, New Jersey to convert it to a DVD. After viewing it, two employees of the store, Brian Morgenstern and another not named in the indictment, alerted authorities, who initiated a full-scale investigation.

An informant from the FBI infiltrated the group to gather information. The group's planning was caught on video and audio tape by federal authorities. They also trained in Cherry Hill, New Jersey. US Attorney Chris Christie (later elected Governor of New Jersey) said that one of the suspects was able to draw a detailed map of Fort Dix from memory. Serdar Tatar even went to the police in Philadelphia to report that he was being pressured to provide a map of Fort Dix, and that he suspected a terrorist plan. However, he did not have a response from the authorities.

The men continued to work at their jobs. The Duka brothers, Eljvir, Dritan, and Shain (Albanians), worked in roofing. Agron Abdullahu (Albanian), Serdar Tatar (a Turkish legal immigrant), and Mohamad Ibrahim Shnewer (a U.S. citizen from Jordan) held a variety of jobs, including as a taxi driver and clerk for 7-Eleven.

According to news reports, five of the men arrested intended to attack the Fort Dix military base and kill as many servicemen as they could. The sixth man arrested, Abdullahu, was charged with aiding and abetting the possession of firearms by the Duka brothers. In a conversation that was recorded by the informant, Shnewer told the FBI informant "My intent is to hit a heavy concentration of soldiers [...] You hit four, five or six Humvees and light the whole place [up] and retreat completely without any losses".

The men tried unsuccessfully to purchase weapons from an FBI informant, including AK-47s, M16s, semi-automatic SIG Sauer 9 mm handguns, and a Smith & Wesson 9 mm. The informant stated that the weapons were to come from an underground military dealer from Baltimore, Maryland, who had recently returned from Egypt.

One of the men in the Fort Dix plot was recorded on a surveillance tape commenting on a lecture by Anwar al-Awlaki, a prominent Muslim cleric of American and Yemeni citizenship, who went into hiding in Yemen after becoming radicalized in prison there during 2006–2007. (He was targeted for killing by President Obama in 2010 because of his numerous alleged terrorist activities, and killed in September 2011 by an unmanned US drone in Yemen.) On that tape, Shain Duka exclaimed "You gotta hear this lecture ... it's the truth, no holds barred, straight how it is!"

== Trial ==
The six suspects were indicted on June 5, 2007 and were arraigned in federal court in Camden, New Jersey on June 14 where they pleaded not guilty. The U.S. District Judge Robert B. Kugler called it "an unusual case" and called for the trial to begin by early October, adding, "If the government is not able to prove this case, they should not be in jail. I want to get this resolved."

Agron Abdullahu, suspected of having the smallest role in the attack plot, accepted a plea bargain with a limit of 5 years in prison for his weapons offenses. Prosecutors say that while Abdullahu supplied weapons to the other five men, he resisted the idea of attacking the military base.

Opening arguments were presented on October 20, 2008. Assistant U.S. Attorney William Fitzpatrick asserted that the defendants were inspired by jihad, saying "Their motive was to defend Islam. Their inspiration was Al Qaeda and Osama bin Laden. Their intention was to attack the U.S." Prosecutors presented recordings of the plot obtained by two paid FBI informants during a 16-month undercover investigation, as well as suspicious videos that were found on one defendant's computer. Defense attorneys countered that the videos, alleged by the prosecution to be terrorist training videos, showed the defendants on holiday exhibiting "false bravado". They attacked the credibility of the prosecution's witnesses. Informant Mahmoud Omar confessed during the trial that two Duka brothers - Dritan and Shain - knew of no Fort Dix plot. "They had nothing to do with this," he said. On December 22, 2008, after 5 and a half days of deliberations, the jury found the plotters to be guilty of charges of conspiracy to harm US military personnel. They were acquitted on the charge of attempted murder.

During sentencing, Dritan and Shain Duka received life sentences for the conspiracy conviction, with an additional 30 years for related weapons charges. Eljvir Duka and Mohamad Shnewer both received life sentences, and Serdar Tatar was sentenced to 33 years in prison.

A 2011 NPR report said that some of the men associated with this group were imprisoned in a highly restrictive Communication Management Unit.

In June 2016, Judge Robert Kugler denied requests for a retrial. In his decision, Judge Kugler - the same as the original trial - stated that the Dukas were aware of their right to testify and consciously decided not to. Shain Duka's lawyer, Robert Boyle, called the judge's decision "disappointing but not entirely unexpected" and said he would appeal the decision. Lynne Jackson, an attorney for SALM, said: "Fort Dix Five supporters will continue to advocate for them and will continue to seek justice for the brothers. We will never give up until they are free. "

In December 2020 Sedar Tatar applied to be released from prison during the COVID-19 pandemic due to having tuberculosis. Judge Robert Kugler denied the request.

== Imprisonment ==
Eljvir Duka is currently being held at United States Penitentiary, Hazelton, while Dritan Duka is at Communications management unit (CMU) at Federal Correctional Institution, Terre Haute and Shain Duka is at United States Penitentiary, Atwater.

Mohamad Shnewer is serving his life sentence at the United States Penitentiary, Terre Haute, a high-security facility in Indiana.

Serdar Tatar is serving his 33-year sentence at the Federal Correctional Institution, McKean, a medium-security facility in Pennsylvania, and is scheduled for release in 2035.

Agron Abdullahu was released on March 24, 2009.

== Chronology of events ==
- January 31, 2006 – An individual brings a tape to a Circuit City in New Jersey for duplication and transfer to DVD. The video features 10 young men conducting militia style assault training shooting their weapons at a firing range while shouting "Allahu Akbar". The Circuit City employees, Brian Morgenstern and one other not to be named at this time, who saw the video contacted the Mt. Laurel Police who in turn contacted the FBI.
- By April 2006, the FBI hired informant Mahmoud Omar to approach the suspects.
- August 11, 2006 – Mohamad Ibrahim Shnewer travels to Fort Dix and Fort Monmouth to conduct surveillance.
- August 13, 2006 – Shnewer travels to Dover Air Force Base, Delaware to conduct surveillance.
- August 13, 2006 – Shnewer travels to the U.S. Coast Guard building in Philadelphia, Pennsylvania to conduct surveillance.
- August 16, 2006 – Shnewer travels to Naval Air Engineering Station Lakehurst to conduct surveillance.
- November 28, 2006 – Serdar Tatar, who had delivered pizza to Fort Dix before, obtains a map of the Fort Dix military installation through his employer's pizza delivery restaurant, which serves the military base.
- February 2, 2007 – Dritan Duka, Eljvir Duka and Sulayman Shain Duka conduct weapons training in Gouldsboro, Pennsylvania.
- February 4, 2007 – Mohamad Ibrahim Shnewer, Dritan Duka, Eljvir Duka and Sulayman Shain Duka review terrorist training materials.
- February 26, 2007 – Dritan Duka and Eljvir Duka conduct weapons training in Cherry Hill.
- March 15, 2007 – Dritan Duka and Sulayman Shain Duka conduct weapons training in Cherry Hill.
- April 16, 2007 – Dritan Duka contacts an arms dealer (an FBI informant) for weaponry.
- May 7, 2007 – The FBI arrests six members of the group.
- December 22, 2008 - A federal jury finds five of the six alleged plotters guilty of conspiracy to commit an act of terrorism and weapons charges.

== See also ==
- Lackawanna Six
- Joint Terrorism Task Force
- 2006 Toronto terrorism case
- 2009 Bronx terrorism plot
- 2015 Chattanooga shootings
