= Little Rock recruiting office shooting =

2009 shooting in Little Rock, Arkansas, US

2009 Little Rock military recruiting office shooting
- Left – Little Rock, shown within Pulaski County Right – Pulaski County, shown within Arkansas
- Location: 34°45′33″N 92°22′31″W; 9112 North Rodney Parham Road, Little Rock, Arkansas, US
- Date: June 1, 2009; 10:19 a.m.
- Target: U.S. military recruiting office
- Attack type: Drive-by shooting; Domestic terrorism
- Weapon: SKS rifle
- Deaths: 1
- Injuries: 1
- Perpetrator: Abdulhakim Mujahid Muhammad
- Motive: Islamic extremism Opposition to the Iraq War

On June 1, 2009, Carlos Leon Bledsoe, a 23-year old American man, opened fire with a rifle in a drive-by shooting on soldiers in front of a United States military recruiting office in Little Rock, Arkansas. He killed Private William Long and wounded Private Quinton Ezeagwula.

After his arrest, Bledsoe acknowledged shooting the men. He told police that he had intended to kill as many Army personnel as possible. He had an SKS rifle, a Mossberg 702 Plinkster rifle, two handguns, 562 rounds of ammunition, and military books in his car. Bledsoe was charged with capital murder, attempted capital murder, and 10 counts of unlawful discharge of a weapon. Bledsoe also reportedly faced 15 counts of engaging in a terrorist act.

A convert to Islam, Carlos Bledsoe (who changed his name to Abdulhakim Mujahid Muhammad) had gone to Yemen in 2007 to teach English, staying for about 16 months. He was deported from Yemen to the United States, after having been detained for overstaying his visa.

In January 2010, Bledsoe wrote to the judge in his case. He claimed that he was sent on the attacks by Al-Qaeda in the Arabian Peninsula (AQAP), and pleaded guilty to the charges of capital murder. He had not consulted with his lawyers, and no independent confirmation of his claim has been made. His father described him as "unable to process reality".

The lead prosecutor for Pulaski County, Arkansas, said about Bledsoe's attack, "If you strip away what he says, self-serving or not, it's just an awful killing, it's like a lot of other killings we have."

His shooting attack was the first of two in 2009 at US military facilities. In the Fort Hood shooting in November, US Army psychiatrist Nidal Malik Hasan shot and killed 13 and wounded 32 other soldiers. A Senate special report chaired by Independent Senator Joseph Lieberman declared it "the deadliest terrorist attack within the United States since September 11, 2001". Hasan was charged with murder and was sentenced to death.

The Arkansas prosecutor took the Bledsoe case to trial in 2011. The defense lawyers said that the young man suffered "a delusional disorder". During the trial, Bledsoe changed his plea to guilty and the prosecutor accepted it. On July 25, 2011, Bledsoe was sentenced to life in prison.

At trial, the suspect was charged by the state with capital murder and related charges, not terrorism. Some terrorism experts have noted a connection to other homegrown terror plots in recent years, including targets, ideological motives, and religious inspiration. Other experts stated that the suspect had personal problems, making him vulnerable to recruitment into a fanatical ideology.

== Shooting ==
=== Attack ===
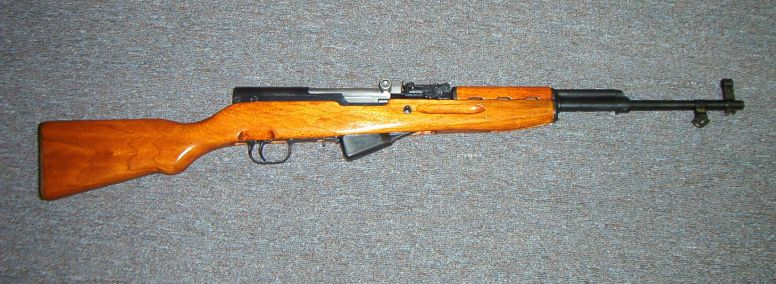
An SKS rifle, the type used by Bledsoe in the attack

Bledsoe drove by the Little Rock U.S. Army recruiting center at 9112 North Rodney Parham Road near Reservoir Road in a black 2003 Ford Explorer Sport Trac at 10:19 a.m. on June 1, 2009. Private William Andrew "Andy" Long, 23, of Conway, Arkansas, and Private Quinton I. Ezeagwula, 18, of Jacksonville, Arkansas, were standing outside the recruiting center in uniform, smoking cigarettes. The two victims had completed basic training two weeks prior, and volunteered to work as recruiters, which was not their regular assignment. Bledsoe approached them in his vehicle, stopped, and shot them with an SKS rifle.

A witness, Lance P. Luplow, heard approximately seven loud bangs and then saw a black truck with tinted windows speeding away, with its tailgate down spilling bottles of water onto the street. Luplow ran to Long, who had been shot several times and appeared to be dead. Ezeagwula was crawling to the door, holding a bloodied ear. Ezeagwula exclaimed: "Tell me this isn't real, tell me this isn't real". Other soldiers came to perform first aid and attempted CPR on Long. Long was dead upon arrival at a hospital. Ezeagwula, who was shot in his back, head, and buttocks, was rushed into surgery at Baptist Hospital in critical condition.

Long's father later remarked: "They weren't on the battlefield, but apparently, the battlefield's here."

In 2015, the Purple Heart was awarded to those who were shot.

=== Attempted escape ===
Bledsoe drove away from the scene, hoping to reach Memphis, Tennessee, where he intended to switch cars. With police in pursuit, Bledsoe got confused in a construction zone and was captured, eight miles from the recruiting center, near the intersection of Interstate 30 and Interstate 630 in Little Rock. He surrendered to Little Rock police officers without incident.

He was wearing an ammunition belt when he exited his vehicle. He said: "It's a war going on against Muslims, and that is why I did it". He used language "indicating an association with jihad", and claimed that he had explosives, but none were found.

He was found to be in possession of an SKS rifle, a Mossberg 702 Plinkster with scope and laser sight, a .22 caliber handgun, a .380 Lorcin L-380 semi-automatic handgun, 562 rounds of ammunition loaded in magazines, homemade sound suppressors, binoculars, a "suspicious" package, and two military books. A police search of his apartment turned up Molotov cocktails, homemade sound suppressors, and compact discs labeled in Arabic script.

=== Motive and other targets ===
It's a war out against Islam and Muslims, and I'm on the side of the Muslims point blank ... The U.S. has to pay for the rape, murder, bloodshed, blasphemy it has done and still doing to the Muslims and Islam. So consider this a small retaliation, the best is to come Allah willing. This is not the first attack, and won't be the last.

— Abdulhakim Mujahid Muhammad

Bledsoe later said he intentionally killed the soldiers, and would have killed more people if more had been there. He said that he did not regard his action as murder, because American military actions in the Middle East justify the slaying of Americans.

Law enforcement officials said Bledsoe had researched various targets around the United States, including military bases, government facilities, and synagogues.

== Perpetrator ==
The shooter, Carlos Leon Bledsoe, was born on July 9, 1985, in Memphis, Tennessee, to Melvin Bledsoe, a businessman and owner of Blues City Tours in Memphis, TN and his wife Linda. He has a sister Monica. Raised as a Baptist and considered a "sunny child", he graduated from Craigmont High School in Memphis in 2003. He attended Tennessee State University in Nashville, Tennessee, for several semesters.

Bledsoe converted to Islam in 2004 at Masjid As-Salam, a Memphis mosque. He has said "I've loved jihad ever since I became Muslim." He became more devout and prayed regularly at the Islamic Center of Nashville, and wore Arab-style clothing. By 2007 he was a deeply religious Muslim and had legally changed his name to Abdulhakim Mujahid Muhammad.

=== Yemen (September 2007 – January 2009) ===
In 2007, Muhammad traveled to visit Yemen, where he stayed 16 months. He worked as an English teacher and learned how to speak Arabic. While there, in September 2008 he married Reena Abdullah Ahmed Farag, an elementary school teacher from South Yemen.

=== Detention ===
In his handwritten letters of May to October 2010, Muhammad claimed to have known people in Yemen who "showed him around and helped him get started," but he refused to identify them for what he referred to as "security reasons." He said he was on several occasions asked to conduct attacks on the United States, but had to refuse, as he did not know how to use explosives. He said he tried to go to Somalia for the necessary training, particularly how to make car bombs. He wrote in 2010, "[H]ad I got this training my story would have ended a lot differently than it's going to end now. My drive-by would have been a drive-in, with no one escaping the aftermath."

Muhammad was arrested at a roadside checkpoint in Yemen on November 14, 2008. He had overstayed his visa, did not have the required government travel permits, and was holding a fraudulent Somali passport. According to his 2010 letters about this period, in his car were books about explosives, literature by Anwar Al-Awlaki (the late cleric in Yemen linked to Al-Qaeda in the Arabian Peninsula), and videos and reading material about "Muslim soldiers in different parts of the world".

Imprisoned for over two months in Yemen, Muhammad said that he was repeatedly interrogated but not subjected to torture. He began his plans for jihad against the U.S. while he was in prison. James E. Hensley Jr., Bledsoe's American lawyer after his arrest in the United States, later said that he was radicalized by Islamic fundamentalists while in prison.

Under pressure from the United States, Yemen deported Muhammad to the U.S. on January 29, 2008. Because his original plan to travel to Somalia for bomb training had been foiled by his arrest in Yemen, Muhammad said Al-Qaeda in the Arabian Peninsula (AQAP) helped him create a new plan of attack. Investigators have not independently confirmed his claims.

=== Return to the U.S. (January 2009–present) ===
Muhammad moved in with his parents in Memphis for several months on his return. He moved to Little Rock, Arkansas, in April, where his father opened an office of his tour bus business (Twin City Tours) to provide a job as a driver for his son and create a chance for him to bring his wife from Yemen.

Muhammad was investigated by the FBI's Joint Terrorism Task Force when he returned. The Task Force also investigated the suspect's visit to Columbus, Ohio; authorities had monitored some Somali Americans traveling from there to Somalia to "wage jihad."

According to Muhammed's seven handwritten letters from May to October 2010, which he sent to The Commercial Appeal newspaper, he described his planning and activities related to his June 2009 attack. He claimed to have bought several used guns as a way to avoid scrutiny, stockpiled ammunition, practiced target shooting, and bought a .22-caliber rifle at Walmart to determine whether he was being watched.

Muhammad said in his letters that none of his attacks had gone as planned. His initial plan was to kill rabbis and target Zionist organizations, and to attack army recruiting centers. According to the U.S. Department of Homeland Security, he used Google Maps to plan attacks on recruiting centers in at least five states (including in New York, Atlanta, Louisville, and Philadelphia). He also intended to target Times Square in New York City, Jewish institutions (including in Atlanta), a day-care center, a post office, and a Baptist church.

In an interview, Muhammad said his jihad started in Little Rock. He then drove to Nashville and threw a Molotov cocktail at an orthodox rabbi's house, but the device failed to detonate. He drove to an Army recruiting center in Florence, Kentucky, because it was close to the highway and near the Ohio border. But the center was closed. He then returned to Little Rock, where he shot the soldiers at the recruiting station.

He was indicted on one count of capital murder and 15 counts of terrorist acts.

=== Mention in Congressional hearings ===
In a March 2011 Congressional hearing addressing the issue of domestic radicalization of Muslims, Muhammad's father spoke of his son's descent into extremism. Bledsoe described his son's religious conversion and travels to Yemen, where he had been "trained and programmed" to kill. Bledsoe said, "Our children are in danger," and that, "It seems to me that Americans are sitting around doing nothing about radical extremists. This is a big elephant in the room." On an earlier occasion, Bledsoe had said, "If it can happen to my son, it can happen to anyone's son."

== Legal proceedings ==
I knew this would end with the enemies of Allah killing me. But the good thing is—Martyrs don't die! Allah says, "Don't think of those who are killed for the sake of Allah as dead. Rather they are alive with their Lord." (Qur'an 3:169) And that's what I believe. The jihad lives on.

— Abdulhakim Mujahid Muhammad

Bledsoe was charged by the state of Arkansas with capital murder, attempted capital murder, and 10 counts of unlawful discharge of a weapon. Prosecutors sought the death penalty.

He was held in the Pulaski County Detention Center, awaiting a scheduled February 2011 jury trial. In January 2010, Arkansas Judge Herbert Wright ordered the State's Public Defenders Commission to pay part of the bill for Bledsoe's private attorney. That same month, in a two-page, handwritten letter to the judge in his case, Bledsoe changed his plea to guilty. He claimed to be a "soldier in Al-Qaeda in the Arabian Peninsula" (AQAP), and described the recruiting office shooting as a "Jihadi attack." He said he was part of Abu Basir's Army, a reference to Naser Abdel-Karim al-Wahishi, the AQAP leader in Yemen. Bledsoe affirmed that his sanity was intact, and that he was acting of his own volition in changing his plea.

At the time the County Prosecutor Jegley said that he was still intending to go to trial; he would have had to recommend that Muhammed's plea be accepted for the court to do so. He said he was not going to have the defendant determine the course of the trial.

Bledsoe wrote at the time, "I wasn't insane or post-traumatic, nor was I forced to do this Act. The attack was justified according to Islamic Laws and the Islamic Religion. Jihad—to fight those who wage war on Islam and Muslims." Bledsoe did not discuss his change in plea with his lawyers ahead of time.

Discussing his claim of affiliation with the Al-Qaeda group in Yemen led by al-Awlaki (killed in September 2011) and al-Wahishi, he wrote in his letters of May to October 2010:

Far as Al-Qaeda in the Arabian Peninsula ... yes, I'm affiliated with them. ... Our goal is to rid the Islamic world of idols and idolaters, paganism and pagans, infidelity and infidels, hypocrisy and hypocrites, apostasy and apostates, democracy and democrats, and relaunch the Islamic caliphate ... and to establish Islamic law (Shari'ah).

Bledsoe's father Melvin Bledsoe said he doubted whether his son had any such ties. Bledsoe described his son as "unable to process reality" and being so "brainwashed" that he wanted to be convicted of terrorism and executed, thus becoming a martyr.

== Charges and trial ==
The lead prosecutor for Pulaski County, Arkansas, believed Bledsoe acted alone, as did other law enforcement officials: "If you strip away what he says, self-serving or not, it's just an awful killing, it's like a lot of other killings we have." They and his father Melvin Bledsoe said there was no evidence Bledsoe was ever in contact with Anwar al-Awlaki.

In June 2010, Bledsoe was charged with assaulting an inmate with a weapon fashioned out of eyeglasses, after a similar attack on a jail officer in April.

Both the prosecutor and Bledsoe's lawyers wanted to go to trial, which started in 2011. His lawyers defended him on the grounds that he suffered "a delusional disorder." During the trial, Bledsoe changed his plea to guilty. On July 25, 2011, the judge sentenced Muhammed to life in prison without the possibility of parole.

== Significance ==
The suspect was noted in early press accounts as among recent Muslim converts planning or carrying out violent attacks that security experts called a disturbing new domestic trend. The attack came less than two weeks after a foiled bomb plot on two synagogues in Riverdale, New York, led by four men with records of incarceration, drug abuse and mental illness. Although the four men were originally identified by some sources as having converted to Islam in prison or shortly after their incarcerations, the New York Times reported that their religious affiliation was uncertain, and they had never served together in prison. Two had registered as Baptist and one as Catholic in earlier prison terms; one said he had converted to Islam and another listed no religion. They had no ties to any international terrorist organization.

The New York Times noted of Bledsoe's alleged ties to Al-Qaeda, "If evidence emerges that his claim is true, it will give the June 1, 2009, shooting in Little Rock new significance at a time when Yemen is being more closely scrutinized as a source of terrorist plots against the United States." No additional evidence at trial has confirmed Muhammed's claims and he was not charged with terrorism.

Some terrorism experts thought there was a connection in Muhammed's case to other homegrown terror plots in recent years, including targets, ideological motives and religious inspiration. Neil Livingstone, a terrorism consultant, said that people on the margins of society are "easy marks" for recruiters offering them ideological and fanatical religious justifications for violence, noting "Most of these guys — I think what it comes down to — they're misfits, they believe they've suffered injustice. ... They basically are striking back at society."

== Parents for Peace ==
In 2015, Melvin Bledsoe and his daughter Monica Holley established the non-profit Parents for Peace 501(c)(3), as a resource for families dealing with the radicalization of a loved one. The organization runs the country's only confidential toll-free helpline for families concerned about the radicalization of a loved one. Initially established primarily as a support group, the focus of Parents for Peace moved to policy and prevention after there had been growing extremist violence within a couple of years.

As of 2024 Parents for Peace is based in Boston and led by psychotherapist Myrieme Churchill, with Kevin Lambert as program director. Its helpline has taken calls from families concerned about loved ones whose radicalization covers a variety of ideologies, including white supremacy, jihadism, eco-terrorism, and Antifa. In 2023, the number of calls (over 700) increased by nearly 60 percent compared with 2022. The main aim of the organization is to help families guide their loved one away from extremism by examining any underlying issues and also to find other significance in their lives outside of the ideology they're following, which can take a long time. Parents for Peace also runs support groups for families to talk about their experiences.

== See also ==
- 2015 Chattanooga shootings
