= Our Dumb Century =

Satirical humor book

Our Dumb Century: The Onion Presents 100 Years of Headlines from America's Finest News Source
- Cover of 2007 deluxe reissue
- Author: Scott Dikkers
- Language: English
- Series: The Onion
- Subject: Historical revisionism
- Genre: Satire
- Published: March 23, 1999 (Three Rivers Press)
- Publication place: United States
- Media type: Paperback
- Pages: 176
- Awards: Thurber Prize for American Humor (1999)
- ISBN: 978-0609804612
- OCLC: 53288090
- Dewey Decimal: 081 21
- LC Class: PN6231.N6 O95 1999

Our Dumb Century: The Onion Presents 100 Years of Headlines from America's Finest News Source is a satirical humor book written by The Onion and published by Three Rivers Press in 1999.

== Premise ==
The book, spun off from The Onion weekly-newspaper format of dryly satirizing current events, features mocked-up newspaper front pages from the entire 20th century, presented as though The Onion had been continuously in print since before 1900. The publication of the book is in itself a parody of other end of the century retrospectives that had been published in 1999, notably Time magazine and The New York Times. Onion editor-in-chief Scott Dikkers oversaw section editors Maria Schneider (1900-1939), John Krewson (1940-1969), and Robert Siegel (1970-1999).

In 1996, the book proposal was sold to Hyperion Books, then a Disney subsidiary, for $150,000. However, Disney lawyers objected to jokes related to their brands and satire of historical prejudice. Rather than rewrite the book, The Onion cancelled the deal, reselling the book for a $450,000 advance from Three Rivers Press in 1998.

An audio version of the book was produced by Scott Dikkers and adapted by Tim Harrod. It was presented as excerpts from the real, nationally syndicated The Onion Radio News throughout the same time period and covering many of the same subjects.

== Summary ==
The book satirizes many common beliefs, trends, and perceptions. For instance, in response to the John F. Kennedy assassination theories, one headline declares, "Kennedy Slain By CIA, Mafia, Castro, LBJ, Teamsters, Freemasons" and that he was shot "129 times from 43 different angles." This is later followed up by an article proclaiming that the "Warren Commission admits to killing JFK."

The book often takes a cynical look at American foreign policy over the ages, describing past events with revisionist, modern-day perspectives. For example, the Pearl Harbor attacks are described as being an attack on a "colonially-occupied US non-state" and President Woodrow Wilson encourages Americans to fight in World War I in order to "make the world safe for corporate oligarchy." The article on the 1920 granting of women's suffrage states "Women Finally Allowed to Participate in Meaningless Fiction of Democracy." The article on the beginning of World War II is "WA- (headline continued on page 2)," with "WA-" in especially large print, followed by the subtitle "Hitler invades Britain, Belgium, Denmark, Norway, Netherlands, France, Greece, Yugoslavia, Hungary, Luxembourg."

Articles on major historical events are often preceded by ironic articles criticizing the irresponsibility that led to such events: For example, an issue dated a week before the 1929 crash of the American stock market heralds the market as "invincible" and urges readers to "put everything they have into the stock market". In similar fashion, an issue that precedes one announcing the outbreak of World War I shows Archduke Franz Ferdinand (whose assassination sparked the war) declaring that "no man can stop [him]".

Smaller stories in the book satirize social and pop-cultural trends of their respective eras, such as the faux-advertisements and gimmicks that abound in the top and bottom corners of the pages. For example, from the 1920s: "No, No, Nanette Fever Bonus! Sheet Music from 'Tea for Two' Inside".

Since the book was written before the year 2000, its prediction for that year satirized Y2K and religious prophecies, including "Christian Right Ascends to Heaven," "All Corporations Merged Into OmniCorp," and a small graphic listing meteors headed for Earth by size.

=== Running gags ===
There are a number of running gags through this supposed history of the twentieth century. One is the existence of a piece of farmyard equipment called 'The Chicken Raper'. Another is that every major celebrity trial, from Roscoe Arbuckle to O.J. Simpson, is referred to as "the trial of the century." A third is the newspaper fear-mongering by drawing a caricature of America's enemy du jour (among them, Spaniards, Nazis, and hippies) sexually assaulting the Statue of Liberty.

Three consecutive pages show a fictionalized end to Richard Nixon's presidency which loosely parallels the end of Gary Tison's life. First, Nixon is arrested for his connection to the Watergate scandal; the next week's headline says he then escaped and is on the run; the third says he was gunned down in a shootout with cops (but Spiro Agnew is still at large). Article titles from 1905 and 2000 both read 'Arabs, Jews Forge New Age of Peace.'

A more subtle satire is the rise of a (fictional) company called Global Tetrahedron, which first appears as a small business in the first decade of the century and gradually grows into a multinational behemoth. On April 25, 2024, The Onion was sold by G/O Media to a newly created firm actually named Global Tetrahedron. Publisher Emeritus, T. Herman Zweibel (portrayed by Dikkers, and named after the German word for "onion," Zwiebel), writes frequent editorials, growing more and more erratic until he is removed from power by the board of directors in the 1950s.

=== Cultural references ===
Several events from the classic film It's a Wonderful Life are also used as stories, such as the Bedford Falls High School class drowning in a "jitterbugging accident", "Mr. Potter To Pay Fifty Cents on the Dollar" during the Great Depression and "Harry Bailey Wins Congressional Medal of Honor" in the World War II section, with Harry S. Truman quoted in the latter story as saying "we owe a great debt to George Bailey for pulling Harry out of the ice when he was 9" and saying George was declared 4-F because of his ear. Eventually, in the 1980s, George Bailey is indicted as part of the savings and loan crisis. Also present is the frequent theme of moral outrage at the amount of sex in popular culture, beginning with a depiction of women's undergarments reproduced from a Sears catalogue, then extending to jazz music (also thought to have sunk the Titanic), Clara Bow appearing sleeveless in a film, and culminating in "Hippies Celebrate Fuck Summer '67".

The space race is repeatedly covered, including such articles as "Bleeping Two-Foot Tin Ball Threatens Free World" about the Sputnik launch, "Soviets Ahead in Dog-Killing Race" about the flight of experimental animals, and finally "Holy Shit, Man Walks on Fucking Moon", a recreation of the Apollo 11 landing, complete with a radio transcript filled with profanity.

== Reception ==
The book became a number one New York Times best-seller shortly after its publication on April 1, 1999. The book ultimately sold 500,000 copies, and it was awarded the 1999 Thurber Prize for American Humor. Staff were only paid $1,300 for their contributions to the book, creating some resentment.

== See also ==
- Our Dumb World
