= The Art of Survival =

The Art of Survival may refer to:

- The Art of Survival, re-release of the book Trump: Surviving at the Top
- The Art of Survival (album), 2022 album by Bush
