= Donald Trump's The Art of the Deal: The Movie =

- Film poster
- Directed by: Jeremy Konner
- Written by: Joe Randazzo
- Based on: Trump: The Art of the Deal by: Donald Trump; & Tony Schwartz
- Starring: Johnny Depp; Michaela Watkins; Jason Mantzoukas; Ron Funches; Kristen Schaal; Jack McBrayer; Patton Oswalt; Alfred Molina; Henry Winkler; Andy Richter; Stephen Merchant; Paul Scheer; Albert Tsai; Robert Morse; Sayeed Shahidi; Emjay Anthony; Jacob Tremblay; Ron Howard
- Cinematography: Kevin Atkinson
- Edited by: Marty Cramer
- Music by: Dan Gross and Kenny Loggins
- Production company: Funny or Die
- Distributed by: Funny or Die
- Release date: February 10, 2016
- Running time: 50 minutes
- Country: United States
- Language: English
- Budget: $250,000

Donald Trump's The Art of the Deal: The Movie is a 2016 American parody film by the production company Funny or Die. The satire of businessman Donald Trump was released during his 2016 campaign for President of the United States, nine months before he was elected president.

Loosely based on the 1987 autobiographical book The Art of the Deal, the film purports to be a 1988 adaptation of the book, with Johnny Depp as Donald Trump, Michaela Watkins as Ivana Trump, and a supporting cast that includes Jack McBrayer, Stephen Merchant, Patton Oswalt, Alfred Molina, Henry Winkler, Ron Funches, Andy Richter, Jacob Tremblay, Paul Scheer, Kristen Schaal, Jason Mantzoukas, and Ron Howard as himself.

== Plot ==
Director Ron Howard begins by saying that he has discovered a long-lost movie of the week based on Donald Trump's bestselling book The Art of the Deal that was written by, directed by and stars Trump himself.

The film starts in 1986, where a young boy stumbles into Donald Trump's office holding a copy of the book The Art of the Deal. Trump must then take a call from Merv Griffin, who refuses to sell him Taj Mahal Casino and Resort in Atlantic City. Trump then describes his background and personal history in order to educate the young boy.

Chapter 1: The Art of Intimidating Rent Controlled Tenants, which takes place in 1983, Trump meets a homeless vagrant and convinces him to scare away the tenants of one of the buildings he owns.

Chapter 2: The Art of Defeating Totally Bogus Discrimination Lawsuits features Trump in 1973 butting heads with the Mayor of New York City, Ed Koch. He agrees with club owner Igor Cassini that he won't sleep with any of the wives of the other club members. Trump recruits Roy Cohn to help him fight discrimination charges, which they win. Jerry Schrager becomes Trump's new lawyer after Cohn dies of AIDS.

After performing a rap about litigation with hip-hop group The Fat Boys, Trump introduces Chapter 3: The Art of Suing Those Losers at the NFL. He recounts his feud with Pete Rozelle over the New Jersey Generals, which causes Trump to sue Rozelle for breaking antitrust laws. A judge rules in favor of Trump. However, the damages awarded to him is only a symbolic $1.

After learning that the young boy is named Jose, Trump cuts to commercial and has him replaced with an Asian-American boy.

Trump's wife Ivana enters the office, talking about her time working at the Trump Castle in Atlantic City. Trump then introduces Chapter 4: The Art of Buying a Casino from the Hilton Family, which recounts Trump traveling to meet Barron Hilton, who sells him a casino.

In Chapter 5: The Art of Marrying a Gorgeous Immigrant, he recounts his wedding to Ivana in 1977, where his best man was ALF.

Trump once again tries to negotiate for the Taj Mahal with Griffin, to no avail. Trump's architect Der Scutt shows Trump his design for the Taj Mahal. After learning that the replacement boy is Japanese-American, Trump asks for a new kid, this time African-American, who gets immediately replaced with a Caucasian boy.

The final chapter, entitled Chapter 6: The Art of Building the Trump Tower, has Scutt and Trump discussing the plans for the soon-to-be-constructed Trump Tower in 1978. Trump meets with Tiffany & Co. head Walter Hoving in order to discuss the air rights above his building. Protesters from the Metropolitan Museum of Art protest Trump destroying valuable Art Deco sculptures, but he is apathetic to their concerns.

After the boy tells Trump everything he's learned from him, Merv Griffin finally relents and sells Trump the Taj Mahal in Atlantic City. As Trump and his friends are about to celebrate his 40th birthday, a time traveler comes from the year 2016, planning to stop Trump from running for President of the United States. Then, the 2016 Trump appears, wiping the time traveler from existence, having apparently killed Christopher Lloyd so that he would never appear in the Back to the Future movies. 2016 Trump assures 1986 Trump that he will become president. When Trump and the boy blow out the candles of Trump's birthday cake together, they apparently switch bodies.

In a post-credits scene, Ron Howard says that the film was so bad that it has forced him to re-examine his passion for filmmaking. Imploring the audience to forget the film or that Donald Trump ever existed, he throws the video tape away and burns it.

== Cast ==
- Ron Howard as himself
- Emjay Anthony as Kid 1
- Johnny Depp as Donald Trump
- Kristen Schaal as the voice of Trump's receptionist Gloria (whom Trump calls "Deborah")
- Patton Oswalt as Merv Griffin
- Jason Mantzoukas as a homeless man
- Henry Winkler as Ed Koch
- Rob Huebel as Le Club boss Igor Cassini
- Paul Scheer as Roy Cohn
- Alfred Molina as Jerry Schrager, Trump's lawyer
- Ron Funches, Jordan Coleman, and Joe Nunez as The Fat Boys
- Andy Richter as Pete Rozelle
- Tymberlee Hill as a judge
- Albert Tsai as Kid 2
- Michaela Watkins as Ivana Trump
- Stephen Merchant as Barron Hilton
- Paul Fusco as ALF
- Jack McBrayer as Der Scutt
- Sayeed Shahidi as Kid 3
- Jacob Tremblay as Kid 4
- Robert Morse as Walter Hoving
- Christopher Lloyd as Dr. Emmett "Doc" Brown

== Production ==
The film was directed by Drunk History creator Jeremy Konner. The idea came from Funny or Die editor-in-chief Owen Burke, and was written by former editor of The Onion Joe Randazzo. The production was kept a secret for months. Burke said that they were able to do this by having "a few people sign nondisclosures, but mostly we just begged people not to say anything." The film features an original song from Kenny Loggins, entitled "The Art of the Deal", written specifically for the film.

== Release and reception ==
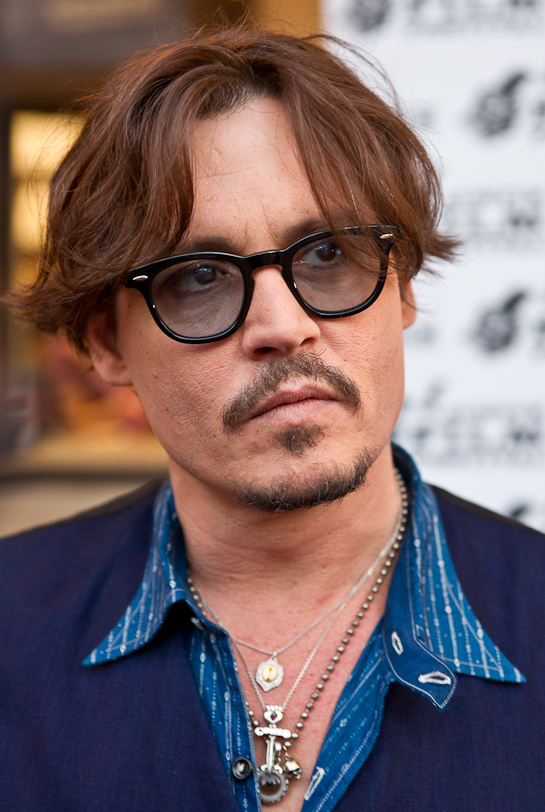
Actor Johnny Depp received praise for his satirical take on Donald Trump.

Donald Trump's The Art of the Deal: The Movie was released for free on Funny or Die.com on February 10, 2016, in order to coincide with Trump's real-life victory at the 2016 New Hampshire primaries. The release of the movie was so secretive, most news outlets did not know it existed until the day it was released, with Salon calling the film a "surprise biopic" and saying it was released "without warning". The film was taken down from the Funny or Die website on February 21, 2016, for undisclosed reasons, with Funny or Die promising to bring it back shortly. The film became available for streaming on Netflix starting on August 1, 2016.

Donald Trump's The Art of the Deal: The Movie has received positive reviews and Depp's performance was praised. On Metacritic, the film has a score of 75 out of 100, based on 4 critics, indicating "generally favorable" reviews. In a review entitled "Who knew Donald Trump was the comeback role Johnny Depp needed?", Erik Adams of The A.V. Club praised Depp's performance in particular, saying "the actor's vocal inflections and mannerisms create an incredible facsimile of Trump—albeit one that's rooted in the twitchy kookiness of Captain Jack Sparrow or Raoul Duke. For once in his post-Pirates of the Caribbean career, an entire production can actually keep up with Depp's whims and tap into his wavelength, striking a tone that's as big and brassy as the character he's playing." He also compared the film to Garth Marenghi's Darkplace in its presentation of Trump as a megalomaniac writing, directing and presenting his own film.

Brian Lowry of Variety was less enthusiastic, saying, "Once you get past the sheer gall of Funny or Die putting together a 50-minute send-up of Donald Trump—starring a near-unrecognizable Johnny Depp, no less—the kick of Donald Trump's The Art of the Deal: The Movie begins to quickly yield diminishing returns. For those shaking their heads in disbelief over the mogul/reality TV star's new-found career in politics, however, just soaking in Depp's mannerisms and dead-on impersonation, along with the various celebrity cameos, will probably be compensation enough."

Writing for Entertainment Weekly, critic Chris Nashawaty said "Before this morning, I would have said that there was nothing funny about Donald Trump's run for the presidency. Then, this morning, something arrived like a Christmas present that came 10 months early: Donald Trump's The Art of the Deal: The Movie. It's utterly demented, slightly terrifying, and most of all hilarious. It's also one of the giddiest and most stinging political satires since Thomas Nast took on Tammany Hall." Will Mann of Bad Shakespeare said "we might one day look back at Donald Trump’s The Art of the Deal: The Movie as not just a film that predicted a Trump presidency (seriously!), but as a hilarious act of political satire, unique in its place in comedic and American history."
