= Randazzo (disambiguation) =

Randazzo may refer to:

== People ==
- Randazzo (surname)

== Places ==
- Randazzo, town in Sicily, Italy

== See also ==
- John, Duke of Randazzo (1342–1348), fourth son of Frederick III of Sicily and Eleanor of Anjou
