= Joe Randazzo =

American comedian (born 1978)

- Born: Joseph Michael Randazzo; March 28, 1978 (age 48)
- Education: Emerson College

Comedy career
- Medium: The Onion, Twitter, Stand-up
- Genre: Satire

Joe Randazzo (born March 28, 1978) is an American comedy writer, stand-up comedian, and improvisational comedian. He is a former editor of the satirical newspaper The Onion. In addition to performing stand-up, Randazzo has been a guest host of the improv comedy show ASSSSCAT 3000 at New York City's Upright Citizens Brigade Theatre. An avid user of Twitter and a critic of Internet memes, Randazzo was nominated for a 2009 ECNY Award for Outstanding Performance in the Field of Tweeting. Randazzo has appeared on NPR's This American Life, PBS's Charlie Rose, and MSNBC's Morning Joe. Randazzo was awarded the Burke Medal for Outstanding Contribution to Public Discourse through the Arts by the College Historical Society of Trinity College Dublin in 2012.

== Early life and education ==
Randazzo is from Penacook, New Hampshire. He earned a bachelor's degree in broadcast journalism from Emerson College, and worked for NPR in Boston shortly thereafter.

== Career ==
After moving to New York, Randazzo met Carol Kolb of The Onion while performing improv comedy at the Magnet Theater.

Randazzo left his job at Manhattan Fruitier, a fruit basket company, in March 2006 to join the editorial staff of The Onion. He was a writer and section editor of The Onion's 2007 book Our Dumb World, a parody of the standard desk atlas, and was promoted to editor in 2008. In Randazzo's tenure, The Onion published the compilation Our Front Pages, was fictitiously sold to a Chinese conglomerate, and openly campaigned for a Pulitzer Prize. Randazzo, who lives in Brooklyn, left The Onion when they relocated their editorial offices to Chicago.

In 2016, he helped write the script for Donald Trump's The Art of the Deal: The Movie, which was a parody of Donald Trump's autobiographical novel of the same name.

== Books ==
- Our Front Pages: 21 Years of Greatness, Virtue, and Moral Rectitude from America's Finest News Source (Onion Presents). The Onion, Scribner, 2009. ISBN 1-4391-5692-1
- Our Dumb World. The Onion, Little, Brown and Company, 2008. ISBN 0-316-01843-0
