= James Sturm =

American cartoonist

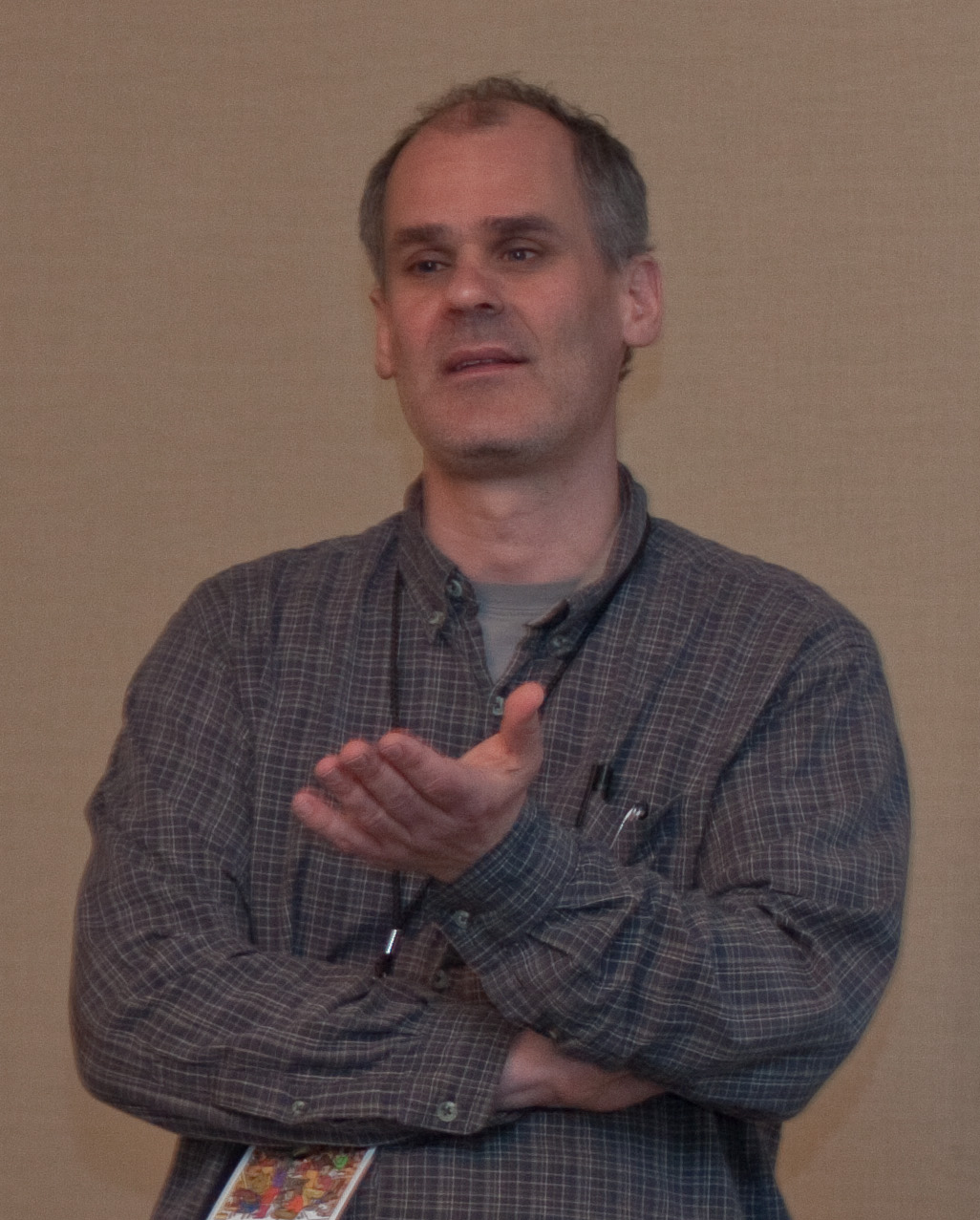
- Sturm in 2010
- Born: 1965 (age 60–61) New York City, New York
- Areas: Cartoonist, Writer, Artist, Editor, Publisher
- Notable works: The Golem's Mighty Swing; The Revival; Hundreds of Feet Below Daylight; Fantastic Four: Unstable Molecules
- Awards: Eisner Award, 2004; Xeric Award, 1996

James Sturm (born 1965) is an American cartoonist and co-founder of the Center for Cartoon Studies in White River Junction, Vermont. Sturm is also the founder of the National Association of Comics Art Educators (NACAE), an organization committed to helping facilitate the teaching of comics in higher education.

== Biography ==
Sturm grew up in Rockland County, New York, and later attended the University of Wisconsin–Madison. In college, he published the comic strip Down and Out Dawg for the student newspaper, The Daily Cardinal. Sturm partnered with Tim Keck (who later co-founded The Onion) to sell monthly calendars decorated with Down and Out Dawg characters, helping both pay for their studies.

In 1988, one year after graduating, he self-published Down and Out Dawg, a book collecting his college newspaper strips, and Commix, an anthology that featured some of the first works of Chris Ware and Scott Dikkers. In 1990, Sturm was hired as a production assistant on Art Spiegelman's RAW magazine, and subsequently was published in the second and fourth issues of the Drawn & Quarterly anthology magazine.

In 1991, Sturm received a Master of Fine Arts from the School of Visual Arts in New York. He then moved to Seattle, Washington, and co-founded the alternative newsweekly, The Stranger. Meanwhile, Fantagraphics published his first comic book The Cereal Killings #1. During the next five years Sturm juggled jobs as art director of The Stranger, publisher of his own Bear Bones Press, and work on his own comics, like The Revival, published in 1996. In 1997, Sturm became a professor at the Savannah College of Art and Design, in Savannah, Georgia.

In 1998, Drawn & Quarterly published the story Hundreds of Feet Below Daylight, the second in Sturm's trilogy of American historical fiction pieces. Two years later came the last installment of the trilogy, the best-selling and award-winning graphic novel The Golem's Mighty Swing. This book went on to be printed in three languages, earned praise from such publications as The Sunday Observer, Entertainment Weekly, and The Washington Post Book World, and was chosen as the Best Graphic Novel of 2000 by Time. In 2004, Drawn & Quarterly collected Hundreds of Feet Below Daylight and The Revival as a deluxe comic book titled Above & Below. In October 2007, the trilogy was collected in a volume entitled James Sturm's America: God, Gold, and Golems.

In 2003, Sturm wrote the Marvel Comics four-issue miniseries Fantastic Four: Unstable Molecules, featuring characters based on the Fantastic Four. It won an Eisner Award for Best Limited Series.

In 2004, Sturm and Michelle Ollie founded the Center for Cartoon Studies, with its first classes offered in the fall of 2005. As of April 2010, he writes a column about the Internet for the website Slate.

== Awards ==
- 2004: Eisner Award "Best Limited Series" for Fantastic Four: Unstable Molecules, with Guy Davis
- 1996 Xeric Award

== Bibliography ==
(writer and artist unless otherwise noted)

- "Friday Night," Drawn & Quarterly #2 (Drawn & Quarterly, October 1990)
- "Signs of the Times," Drawn & Quarterly #3 (Drawn & Quarterly, January 1991)
- "Ring," Drawn & Quarterly #4 (Drawn & Quarterly, March 1991)
- "The Lion and the Mouse," Aesop's Fables #2 (Fantagraphics Books, Fall 1991)
- The Cereal Killings #1–8 (Fantagraphics Books, March 1992–September 1995)
- The Revival (Bear Bones Press, 1996)
- The Golem's Mighty Swing (Drawn & Quarterly, July 2001)
- (script and layouts only) Startling Stories: Fantastic Four - Unstable Molecules #1–4 (Marvel Comics, March–June 2003)
- Above and Below: Two Stories of the American Frontier (Drawn & Quarterly, Autumn 2004)
- (script only) Satchel Paige: Striking Out Jim Crow (Hyperion/Jump at the Sun, 2007)
- Market Day (Drawn & Quarterly, 2010) ISBN 1-897299-97-4
- Off Season (Drawn & Quarterly, 2019) ISBN 978-1770463318
- (with illustrator Joe Sutphin) Watership Down (Ten Speed Graphics) ISBN 978-1984857194

=== Adventures in Cartooning series ===
- Adventures in Cartooning with Andrew Arnold, and Alexis Frederick-Frost (2009) First Second
- Adventures in Cartooning Activity Book Andrew Arnold, and Alexis Frederick-Frost (2010) First Second
- Adventures in Cartooning: Christmas Special with Andrew Arnold, and Alexis Frederick-Frost (2012) First Second
- Adventures in Cartooning: Characters in Action with Andrew Arnold and Alexis Frederick-Frost (2013) First Second
- Sleepless Knight with Andrew Arnold & Alexis Frederick-Frost (2015) First Second
- Gryphons Aren't So Great with Andrew Arnold & Alexis Frederick-Frost (2015) First Second
- Ogres Awake! with Andrew Arnold & Alexis Frederick-Frost (First Second, 2016)
