= Jack Szwergold =

Jack Szwergold is a former comedy writer and the Webby-Award-winning first webmaster for the news parody publication The Onion.

In 1996, he convinced The Onion Editor and Publisher Scott Dikkers that a web site would increase readership, and The Onion's site launched in May 1996. The site has won multiple Webby Awards and other industry and media accolades.

As a writer, he has written for Nickelodeon, National Public Radio, Modern Humorist, Suck.com, Wired, Mother Jones, and Green Magazine as well as created the (now defunct) website Royal Journal as a creative side project independent of his work at the Onion.

In 2012 Jack, who was the Guggenheim Museum's Web Infrastructure Systems Administrator at the time, worked with the curatorial and conservation departments at the museum to recover — and functionally restore — the first web artwork commission made by the museum: Brandon (1998–99) by Shu Lea Cheang. The effort to get the artwork's digital components in working order paved the way for the full restoration of the digital artwork in 2018 which is publicly accessible today.

== Books ==
- Our Dumb Century: The Onion Presents 100 Years of Headlines from America's Finest News Source (contributing writer and illustrator) (1999, ISBN 0-609-80461-8)
- The Onion's Finest News Reporting, Volume 1 (contributing writer and illustrator) (2000, ISBN 0-609-80463-4)
- Dispatches from the Tenth Circle (contributing writer and illustrator) (2001, ISBN 0-609-80834-6)
