= Jim's Journal =

American comic strip by Scott Dikkers

Jim's Journal is a comic strip written and drawn by Scott Dikkers, co-founder of The Onion. The strip first appeared in the University of Wisconsin–Madison The Daily Cardinal newspaper in 1988.

Since April 25, 2011, Jim's Journal has run on "GoComics" featuring both new and classic comics.

== The strip ==
On the flyleaf of the first Jim's Journal collection is a felt-pen drawing of a nondescript young man sitting at a desk and writing in a notebook. Above him are the words, "I'm Jim. This is the journal of my day-to-day life."

The quip perfectly describes the comic: it features nuggets of experience, not processed by Jim, but merely recorded as he moves passively through his world. No context is provided, though anyone who's been to college, worked a minimum-wage job, or lived in a rundown apartment building can supply it. Jim and his friends muddle through school and a series of dead-end jobs, have vague dreams (never seriously attempted) of working in the entertainment business or the space program, and share thoughts such as "I don't think life is absurd or meaningless. I think it's funny." In Jim's world, it is enough to simply exist, and order a pizza once in a while.

== The humor ==
Dikkers' purpose was to parody the typical four-panel comic strip, creating a character-driven strip with a main character who had no discernible personality, observational humor that provided no insights, and no comic timing, just strips that ended without a gag, or sometimes without even a conclusion. Dikkers calls this style anti-humor, "creating humor by poking fun at other humor". (Dikkers, 1999)

== Characters ==
=== Jim ===
He is an almost completely passive person, speaking little and almost never initiating conversation, content to go to school or work, come home, and occasionally venture out in the company of his few friends. He is a keen observer, though he seems to lack the capacity to draw conclusions about what he sees.

=== Tony ===
Jim's college roommate, and later off-campus apartmentmate. Tony is impulsive, often trying out new lifestyles and hobbies, but his short attention span and low threshold of disappointment prevent him from making any major changes. He loves practical jokes, but lacks the know-how for them to succeed, and appoints himself expert on many subjects, though his attention span for other peoples' interests is slight.

Tony was the (stereo)typical college student: drinking and partying, trying to cram an entire semester's worth of work into a week, and hopelessly pursuing girls who dismissed him as immature. After college, he was unable to find a job that would let him use his economics degree. After a long tenure at his older brother's shoe store, he moved "up" to selling cable TV subscriptions over the phone.

=== Ruth ===
Jim met Ruth while working at McDonald's. Ruth is cheerful, kind and a bit overbearing. She is easily the most mature and responsible character in the strip. She was made crew chief at McDonald's. After graduation, she found a job in her chosen field as a dental assistant.

Late in the strip, she and Jim were married, though Jim never documented any change in their relationship before the wedding. Since then, she has devoted herself to the roles of wife, wage-earner and homemaker, and has been gently trying to influence Jim to be more ambitious.

=== Steve ===
Steve was brought into the strip as a third roommate when Jim and Tony moved into their off-campus apartment. He attended the same high school as Tony, a year behind him. Steve was intimidated by the college experience at first; it has never been made clear whether or not he graduated, nor what job he holds, if any. His fondness for junk food and junk TV led to an iconic strip panel, in which he sat in front of the TV eating cereal right out of the box.

Steve strives to be intellectual and creative, without much success, but his native intelligence puts him ahead of Tony, who once tried to play a practical joke on him that fell utterly flat. At times, he exhibits some whimsy, climbing a tree "because it would be fun", or cracking jokes that no one gets except him.

=== Mr. Peterson ===
Jim's cat. Steve returned from his hometown with a kitten, whom he named Mr. Peterson for no known reason. When he attempted to have the cat neutered, Mr. Peterson was revealed to be a female, but her name was not changed. When the three roommates took separate apartments, she became Jim's cat by default.

=== Mark ===
Jim's college classmate, and co-worker at McDonald's. Mark is a typical 1990s pseudointellectual. When they met, Jim noted that Mark "always points out the dreary, hopeless aspect of everything." Jim thought Mark might be trying to be funny, but also observes that in four years at McDonald's, Mark had never gotten a raise, which might be a source of his bitterness. He and Jim take a creative writing course in college. When Mark is absent one day, Jim observes that "the class was quiet without him." Despite sounding off constantly, Mark objects to criticism of his own work, claiming that artistic expression should not be graded.

=== Mike ===
Another McDonald's co-worker. Cheerful and gifted with a genuine flair for comedy, he leaves McDonald's to do stand-up. When he breaks his leg, he welcomes the chance to incorporate it into his act, so he can "stop doing the fat-guy schtick."

=== Dan ===
Jim's co-worker at the copy store. Dan is a quirky geek, more concerned with larger concepts such as time travel, which he thinks would be "neat", than with his own shortcomings. He brings burnt cookies to work, claiming that he likes them that way because it adds flavor. He welcomes guests to his squalid apartment and clears mounds of junk off the couch so they can sit to watch his videos. Later, he stands up to Joel, another co-worker, and the dispute ends with Joel's firing, prompting Dan to observe that "there is justice in the galaxy."

=== Joel ===
Copy store co-worker. The source of his feud with Dan is never disclosed, although Joel's generally abrasive personality might have something to do with it.

=== Julie ===
Copy store co-worker. Apparently depressed to be working so far below her potential, Julie takes out her frustrations on Jim, once throwing a roll of tape at his head. Another time, she asked what she could do on her break. When Jim had no suggestion, she mused, "Maybe I'll drop dead."

=== Brian ===
Copy store co-worker. Brian is a true slacker, doing as little as possible, showing no enthusiasm, and even smoking on the job. When Jim asks why he doesn't like working there, he replies, "It's not MY copy store -- I can only care so much." Later, he quits without notice, reportedly one step ahead of being fired.

=== Steve the manager ===
Jim's first boss at McDonald's, characterized by his "odd reverence" for the company. Early on, he expressed great pride in Jim for mastering the task of heating fish fillet buns, but when Jim dropped a tray of hamburgers, he didn't speak to Jim the rest of the day. After Jim left McDonald's at the end of his freshman year, he snubbed Jim when they met outside the store.

=== Cheryl the manager ===
Steve's replacement. Friendlier and more accessible than Steve. Jim returned to McDonald's when she attempted to round up the disgruntled employees from Steve's tenure.

=== Hal the manager ===
Manager at the copy store. He makes occasional attempts to motivate his employees, such as letting them choose the radio station or bringing malted milks for the staff when they're overloaded with work. However, he once reminded the staff that being manager is "like working 24 hours a day." When Dan was describing the similarities between ape and human social structure, Hal's entrance was perfectly timed to establish him as the alpha.

== Work ==
Jim works a series of minimum wage jobs. He initially applied at McDonald's as a way of meeting people and filling downtime, and quit at the end of the school year. Early in his sophomore year, he was called back to McDonald's, then, after leaving college, applied at a bookstore, where he worked for a short time before being laid off. His longest-lasting job was at a copy store, where he once envisioned a bleak future as the manager. He then had another dead-end job at a grocery. We were never told what Jim's major was in college, and he has never expressed a desire to pursue any particular line of work. The impression is that Jim works because that's what people are supposed to do.

== Recreation ==
Jim has no hobbies to speak of, only occasionally joining Tony or Steve in a game of basketball or billiards, or reading Trivial Pursuit answers for hours at a time. Entertainment for him is either reading a book (at someone else's recommendation), watching a movie, watching Mr. Peterson, or sitting in front of the TV, flipping channels. After Jim and Ruth are married, Ruth attempts to get him into bird watching and stamp collecting, and is upset when he has no interest in either.

On occasion, however, Jim does take time to explore his city and surroundings, as demonstrated by his aimless wanderings around malls or his riding on a bus all day "not going anywhere in particular."

== Book collections ==
- I Went to College and it was okay: A Collection of Jim's Journal Cartoons (1991, ISBN 0-8362-1867-1)
- I Got a Job and it wasn't that bad: The Second Collection of Jim's Journal Cartoons (1993, ISBN 0-8362-1709-8)
- I Made Some Brownies and they were pretty good: The Third Jim's Journal Collection (1995, ISBN 0-8362-1776-4)
- I Got Married if you can believe that: The Fourth Collection of Jim's Journal Cartoons (1996, ISBN 0-8362-1029-8)
- I Feel Like A Grown-Up Now: The Fifth Jim's Journal Collection (1998, ISBN 0-8362-5184-9)
- The Pretty Good Jim's Journal Treasury: The Definitive Collection of Every Published Cartoon (1999, ISBN 978-0-7407-0007-1)
- I Finally Graduated from High School: The Sixth Collection of Jim's Journal Cartoons (2014, ISBN 978-1499149500)
- The Pretty Good Jim's Journal Treasury: The Even More Definitive Collection of Every Published Cartoon (2016, ISBN 978-1535199889)
