= Jeff Lawson =

Jeff Lawson may refer to:

- Jeff Lawson, co-founder of distributed.net
- Jeff Lawson, co-founder and former CEO of Twilio
- Jeff Lawson (footballer) (born 1944), Australian rules footballer for Richmond

== See also ==
- Geoff Lawson (disambiguation)
