= Tim Keck =

American newspaper publisher (born 1967)

- Born: 1967 (age 58–59)
- Citizenship: United States
- Education: University of Wisconsin–Madison
- Occupations: Newspaper publisher, satirist
- Known for: Co-founder of The Onion

Timothy A. Keck (born 1967) is an American newspaper publisher and satirist, best known for co-founding the satirical newspaper The Onion in 1988. After selling it the following year, he founded the free, weekly alternative newspaper The Stranger in 1991.

== Early life ==
Keck was born in Indiana in 1967 to Edward and Janet Keck. His father was a news editor and columnist for The Hammond Times whose family of Volga Germans had fled Ukraine during the 1940s to escape Stalinist deportations, while his mother was its star environmental reporter. After Edward died in 1978, Inland Steel Company executives pressured The Hammond Times to force Janet into resigning. Janet moved the family to Omro, Wisconsin, to care for her father and edit the University of Wisconsin–Oshkosh magazine.

== Career ==
Like his mother, Keck attended the University of Wisconsin–Madison. To pay for college, he partnered with cartoonist James Sturm to sell monthly calendars featuring characters from Sturm's comics in The Daily Cardinal student newspaper. In 1988, Keck co-founded The Onion with Christopher Johnson using $3,000 in seed money from his mother. The idea for a newspaper of fake stories came from The Daily Cardinal's annual April Fools' Day parody issue.

The following year, Keck sold The Onion to Scott Dikkers and Peter Haise for $19,000. Keck used the proceeds to repay a loan, then spent the next six months holidaying in Brazil, before returning to the United States where he settled in Seattle with the intent of founding a free, weekly alternative newspaper. The resulting publication, The Stranger, began publishing in September 1991. In the early 2000s, Keck sold a minority share of The Stranger to the Chicago Reader and founded the Portland Mercury, operating the two papers as Index Newspapers, LLC. In 2018, he stepped down as publisher of The Stranger, while continuing as president of Index Newspapers.

=== Political views ===
As of 2011, according to The Seattle Times, Keck was "largely unknown in Seattle". However, during the 2009 mayoral campaign of Mike McGinn, Keck directed The Stranger to "turn up the dial as high as we could" becoming, according to The Seattle Times, "a de facto arm of the McGinn campaign". The newspaper's endorsement was given to McGinn in a 6,000-word front-page treatment, while news coverage of McGinn's opponent Joe Mallahan used profanities to describe him. Keck, who has rarely given political donations, provided monetary support to the McGinn campaign and attended McGinn's election night victory party. Keck also donated $250 in 2004 to the presidential campaign of John Kerry and $250 the following year to the senatorial campaign of Maria Cantwell.

== Personal life ==
According to Keck, he has dyslexia and sleepwalks, and he is a recreational user of marijuana.

Keck has two children with a woman described in different sources as either a spouse or girlfriend.

== Works cited ==
- Wenc, Christine (2025). Funny Because It's True: How The Onion Created Modern American News Satire. Running Press. ISBN 9780762484430.
