= Spaceman (1997 film) =

- Directed by: Scott Dikkers
- Written by: Scott Dikkers
- Produced by: Scott Dikkers; Michael Hirsh
- Starring: David Ghilardi; Deborah King; Brian Stack
- Cinematography: Chris Chan Lee
- Edited by: Peter Etzweiler
- Music by: Edward Pearsall
- Production company: Nelvana Limited
- Distributed by: Palm Pictures
- Release date: 1997
- Running time: 88 minutes
- Language: English
- Budget: $50,000

Spaceman is a 1997 science fiction/comedy film from Palm Pictures. Filmed in Chicago, it tells of a man adjusting to life on Earth, with one problem: he has been trained only to be a killer since he was abducted as a toddler.
