= Fantastic Four: Unstable Molecules =

2003 Marvel Comics limited series

- Cover of The Fantastic Four: Unstable Molecules (March 2003). Art by Craig Thompson.

Publication information
- Publisher: Marvel Comics
- Schedule: Monthly
- Format: Limited series
- Publication date: March – June 2003
- No. of issues: 4
- Main character: Fantastic Four

Creative team
- Written by: James Sturm
- Artist(s): Guy Davis; Robert Sikoryak; James Storm
- Letterer: Paul Tutrone
- Colorist: Michel Vrana
- Editor(s): Tom Brevoort; Andy Schmidt; Marc Sumerak

Collected editions
- The Fantastic Four: Unstable Molecules: ISBN 0-7851-1112-3

The Fantastic Four: Unstable Molecules is a four-issue comic book limited series published by Marvel Comics. The series imagines that the creators of the Fantastic Four were inspired by people encountered in their own lives during the late 1950s and provides a backstory for those analogues.

== Plot ==
Dr. Reed Richards lives in the small town of Glen Cove and works at Columbia University, attempting to discover a practical use for the sub-atomic particles that he has discovered. He is so absorbed in his work that he forgets that he is due to host a cocktail party for his faculty colleagues and only informs his girlfriend, Susan Storm on the day of the party itself. To compound this oversight he is unexpectedly called away on government business and fails to inform Susan of the situation.

Susan struggles to cope with her domestic duties (including preparing for the party) and providing some guiding discipline for her listless and frustrated younger brother, Johnny - both of their parents having died in a car accident some time previously. In addition, Susan hosts a women's circle made up of some acquaintances of her late mother and some other, younger women. The circle discusses Peyton Place. The discussion turns into a heated debate between the conservative older women and the younger, more liberal women, at least one of whom feels strong echoes between the small town repression of the book and her own life in Glen Cove.

Johnny Storm spends much time fantasizing about hot rods and the comic book superheroine, Vapor Girl. Johnny is unaware that the character of Vapor Girl (who appears in a comic-within-a-comic throughout Unstable Molecules) is based in large part on his own sister. Johnny feels stifled by Glen Cove and is eventually inspired to leave by a beatnik drifter called Joey King, who used to date Susan in high school.

The climax of the story takes place at the cocktail party. Not only are the faculty members from Columbia University present, but also a group of comic book creative staff. This unlikely mix of people is joined by Ben Grimm, Reed Richards' old college roommate who is now a boxing trainer. Following an excess of alcohol, Susan and Ben are on the verge of having sex in Susan's bedroom only to be interrupted by Reed. Reed, who had been planning to propose, begins to storm out of the house but is met by a crowd of beatniks who have arrived with Johnny. In an ensuing scuffle Ben is knocked unconscious. Johnny and Reed then catch a lift out of Glen Cove from Joey.

== Awards ==
- 2004: Won "Best Limited Series" Eisner Award

== Collected editions ==
The series was collected into a trade paperback:

- Fantastic Four: Unstable Molecules (2003, ISBN 0-7851-1112-3)
