= Randazzo (surname) =

Randazzo is a surname. Notable people with the surname include:

- Filippo Randazzo, 18th-century Italian painter
- Filippo Randazzo (athlete) (born 1996), Italian long jumper
- Florencio Randazzo (born 1964), Argentine politician
- Joe Randazzo (born 1978), American comedian and newspaper editor
- Matthew Randazzo V (born 1984), American true crime writer and historian
- Nino Randazzo (born 1932), Italian Australian politician
- Teddy Randazzo (1935–2003), American pop songwriter
