= Thud (media company) =

American media company (2017–2019)

Thud was a satirical media company founded by Ben Berkley, Cole Bolton, and Elon Musk in 2017. The company launched satirical websites and products. After Musk pulled his funding, the company went defunct in May 2019.

== Background ==
In 2014, Elon Musk expressed interest in purchasing satirical news site The Onion, however, the purchase did not make it past preliminary negotiations. In 2017, two former Onion editors who had left the site due to creative differences, Ben Berkley and Cole Bolton, were offered US$2,000,000 in funding by Musk to start a satirical media company focused on real-world events. Berkley and Bolton began building out the company by hiring several other Onion writers and editors. In March 2018, Musk formally announced the venture by tweeting "Thud!" followed by "That's the name of my new intergalactic media empire, exclamation point optional." Musk claimed that the name was chosen because "It’s the sound something thick and dull makes when it hits the ground."

Sometime around the end of 2018, Musk sold the company to Berkley and Bolton, citing concerns that Thud might satirize his own companies. While the two were able to launch several satirical projects over the course of six months, they were unable to find new investors. Berkley and Bolton spent the remaining funds from Musk's investment on web hosting and the company shut down in May 2019.

== Reception ==
Thud's public reception was mixed. Upon its public launch in 2019, a review in Vulture praised the fact that Thud credited its contributors and the darker outlook its satire took but criticized some projects as playing into outdated tropes. Several outlets praised "DNA Friend," a project satirizing at-home DNA testing. After the company shut down, Bolton told The Verge that the investors they reached out to generally did not understand what Thud was satirizing. In a 2021 retrospective in Mic, Amanda Silberling criticized Thud's projects, describing them as failing "to live up to the hype of an Elon Musk-funded ex-Onion powerhouse."

== Projects ==
- TacStorm is a satirical website advertising a gun that continually fires.
- 6 Minute Test is a satire of online personality tests.
- DNA Friend was a parody of at-home DNA kits which claimed it could trace someone's ancestry using photos of their mouth.
- Ploog was a satirical product website advertising a "universal orifice adapter."
- 833-GET-THUD was a parody of phone-based customer service menus that resulted in a maze of options.
- Mampfen was a satirical tourist's guide to restaurants in Los Angeles.
