= Our Dumb World =

2007 satirical work by The Onion

Our Dumb World: The Onion's Atlas of the Planet Earth
- First edition cover
- Author: The Onion
- Language: English
- Genre: Satire
- Published: 30 October 2007 (Little, Brown and Company)
- Publication place: United States
- Media type: Print (Hardcover)
- Pages: 245
- ISBN: 978-0316018425
- OCLC: 474118895

Our Dumb World is a parody of the standard desk atlas created by the staff of The Onion and published by Little, Brown and Company on 30 October 2007. It is The Onion's first book of entirely original content since 1999's Our Dumb Century.

The book, written in the satirical paper's editorial voice, contains entries for nearly every country on Earth, including detailed maps, feature articles, and humorous stereotyped descriptions of regional history and customs. For example, Romania's entry is subtitled, "Bram Stoker's Romania."

There are eight distinct sections of the atlas. In order, North America, South America, Africa, Middle East, Europe, Asia, Oceania, and Extra. Included in the Extra section are the Northern and Southern Poles and Greenland, which is "larger than Africa and South America combined."

The visual style of the book has been compared to Dorling Kindersley's Eyewitness series. The book uses faux xenophobia to illustrate the cultural differences of various nations, often mocking racial stereotypes with satirical comments. Each section contains "facts" about the nation, a brief history, and other information.

Elements of the book have been transferred to an electronic format available on the paper's website and as a layer on Google Earth. Our Dumb World is also available as an audio book.

== Development ==
Editor-in-chief Scott Dikkers struggled to organize writing for the atlas, ultimately settling on theming each entry on an American state or country around a central joke. The troubled writing process led to the resignation of longtime Onion graphics editor Mike Loew.

== Contents of Our Dumb World ==
The book starts off with an introduction written by fictional Onion publisher T. Herman Zweibel. Next is a history of cartography, continental drift, following a typical structure for real atlases. Geographical sections follow, again modelled after actual atlases, but all content being a deliberate mixing of some factual information with humorous falsehoods, often outlandish stereotypes of various regions, cultures, etc. Examples of entirely false statements based loosely on actual geographical realities are given for context and style.

=== United States ===
An example of the typical humorous style of the book: Maine is described as an L. L. Bean catalogue. L. L. Bean operates out of Maine, and is one of the state's more notable businesses, but this is not political commentary on the state, so much as an absurdist image of a state being literally a mail order catalog.

=== Rest of North America ===
Chapter title presumes an American bias to the entire book as a central premise of its humor.

=== South America ===
French Guiana was forgotten by France, and its rediscovery sparked France to see what other things it possesses (French overseas departments). This never happened, but is poking fun at the general idea of colonial powers neglecting their colonies.

=== Africa ===
Madagascar is ruled by lemurs, where in reality the island is known for being the exclusive home for this group of animals.

=== Middle East ===
Kuwait is presented as a person thinking about their relationship with the US, unaware they are being used by them, reducing any real geopolitical concerns to a personal drama.

=== Europe ===
The phrase "France lays claim to being the entire world" pokes fun at Francophone pride and presumed centrality.

=== Asia ===
China's most produced product is listed as Chinese people, poking fun at stereotypes about the large population of China.

=== Australia ===
The entry for Tonga (part of Oceania, often included with Australia) claims that the writers made the country up, and includes clearly fabricated facts about it.

=== The Polar regions ===
The article on the North Pole denies the existence of Father Christmas before asking "Where do all the presents come from?". The article on Greenland claims that the island is the largest landmass in the world (referencing the Mercator projection distortion of land masses at the top and bottom of the projection).

== Critical reaction ==
Critical reaction to Our Dumb World has been generally positive with reviewers praising the humor and use of satire. In the New York Times, William Grimes called it "an astoundingly offensive guide to the states of the union and the countries of the world, compiled on the premise that all countries are ridiculous and contemptible" and found it "sophomoric, transgressive and intermittently brilliant."

== See also ==
- Our Dumb Century
