= StarWipe =

Defunct celebrity gossip satirical website

Starwipe
- Website type: Satire, celebrity gossip
- Available in: English
- Owner: Onion, Inc.
- Editor: Sean O'Neal (former)
- Website: www.starwipe.com
- Commercial: Yes
- Registration: No
- Launched: September 21, 2015
- Current status: Defunct (as of June 17, 2016; 10 years ago)

StarWipe was a satirical website from The Onion which parodied celebrity gossip sites, such as TMZ. It launched on September 21, 2015, and closed on June 17, 2016. It was run by Sean O'Neal, the senior editor of The A.V. Club. Upon closure of the website, the main link and all articles within became inactive, although they can still be accessed through the Wayback Machine.

Content posted on StarWipe was also shared on social media platforms such as Facebook and Twitter.

== See also ==
- List of satirical news websites
