= Geoff Lawson =

Geoff Lawson may refer to:

- Geoff Lawson (cricketer) (born 1957), Australian cricketer
- Geoff Lawson (designer) (1944–1999), British car designer

== See also ==
- Jeff Lawson (disambiguation)
