= Madison Museum of Bathroom Tissue =

Wisconsin museum

MMBT exterior.

The Madison Museum of Bathroom Tissue was established in 1992 and closed in 2000. The museum was founded by Carol Kolb in Madison, Wisconsin in a second-floor apartment, three blocks from the Wisconsin State Capitol.

At its peak, the MMBT's permanent collection contained approximately 3,000 rolls of toilet paper. The toilet paper's origins ranged from the bathrooms of other museums, like the Metropolitan Museum of Art and the Guggenheim, to American tourist destinations like Wall Drug and Graceland. The museum also had European, African, Australian, Canadian, and Mexican toilet paper as well as a collection of toilet paper from bars and restaurants located in Madison. The Manufacturers' Wing contained a collection of retail samples donated by toilet paper manufacturers, many with headquarters in Wisconsin's Fox River Valley paper-producing area.

MMBT exhibit.

The museum closed its doors in December 2000 when the remaining live-in staff vacated the address to move away from Madison. The collection currently resides in Elgin, Illinois and is kept in storage by new owners Caleb and Tracy Hanson. In 2008, the building that had housed the museum was razed.
