= The Onion Book of Known Knowledge =

Satirical book by The Onion

The Onion Book of Known Knowledge is a satirical encyclopedia written by the staff of The Onion, an American satirical newspaper. The book was published by Little, Brown and Company on October 23, 2012.

The book satirizes topics in a wide range of fields, including politics, history, entertainment, medicine and religion.

== Development ==
According to Onion editor Will Tracy, the writing process saw the team listing down various topics they felt had to be covered, such as God and World War II. Once these topics were written, the writers were then given the freedom to write about any other topic they wanted. The writers also scattered various inside jokes throughout the book.

== Publication history ==
Written by the staff of The Onion, the book was published by Little, Brown and Company on October 23, 2012. An audiobook version narrated by Avery Sandford and June Bunt was also released that year by Hachette Audio.

== Critical reception ==
Kirkus Reviews thought the book was "well worth dipping into" and praised its artwork in particular. AudioFile's W.M. noted some of the jokes "wear a bit thin", but found the book funny and entertaining as a whole. The Daily Telegraph's Madeline Healy was impressed by the writers' ability to maintain a consistent voice throughout the book.
