= Michael O'Brien (photographer) =

American photographer

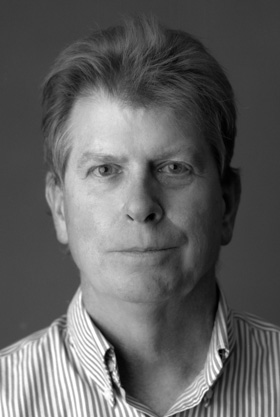
- Born: June 27, 1950 (age 76); Memphis, Tennessee
- Known for: Photographer
- Website: www.obrienphotography.com

Michael O'Brien (born June 27, 1950) is an American photographer noted for his portraiture and documentary photography. Over the past four decades, O'Brien has photographed subjects from presidents, celebrities, and financiers to small-town Texans, including ranchers, beauty queens, writers, and bar owners. O'Brien has completed three books: The Face of Texas: Portraits of Texans (2003), updated with 24 new photographs in 2014; Hard Ground whose portraits of homeless individuals are paired with poems by Tom Waits (2011); and The Great Minds of Investing (2015), a collection of 33 portraits of famous investors such as Warren Buffett, Charlie Munger, Joel Greenblatt, and Bill Ackman, with accompanying profiles written by William Green.

== Early life ==
Michael O'Brien was born on June 27, 1950, in Memphis, Tennessee. In high school, he set up a darkroom in his grandmother's basement with his friend Chris Bell and started photographing his close friends Alex Chilton, Andy Hummel, Jody Stephens and Bell in a band called Big Star. O'Brien has stated that because he "lacked the musical talent" to join the band, he picked up a camera instead.

O'Brien graduated from Memphis University School in 1968, after which he attended the University of Tennessee in Knoxville, Tennessee. At college, he pursued a degree in Philosophy and became a photographer for the student paper, the Daily Beacon, earning four dollars for each published picture. That money, together with occasional freelance jobs, helped O'Brien put himself through school. A turning point came when O'Brien met Jack Corn, a staff photographer for the Nashville Tennessean, and saw his documentary photography series on the coal mining community in Appalachia. By the time he graduated as a Philosophy major in 1972, O'Brien had amassed a substantial portfolio of black-and-white photographs.

O'Brien is married to Elizabeth Owen O'Brien, former reporter with LIFE magazine.

== Professional background ==
Documentary photography

Photograph of people at Duffy's Bar during the resignation speech of Richard Nixon

In 1973, The Miami News hired O'Brien as staff photographer. He covered everything from violent crime scenes, such as double homicides, to portraits for the paper's "Cook of the Month" feature. With three assignments a day, the challenge was to "think of different ways to present stories."

On the evening of Richard Nixon's resignation speech, August 9, 1974, The Miami News sent out all its staff photographers. O'Brien was sent to Duffy's, a blue-collar bar in Coral Gables. "It was a dark bar, but I set up strobes and used a Nikon with Tri-X film. During the speech I saw three men at the bar with their backs turned as Nixon resigned. Their apathy summed up the mood of the country." The Miami News used the photograph the next day for their front-page story.

In 1975, O'Brien developed a documentary feature about homelessness. After seeing a man camped out under an overpass, O'Brien stopped his car and met 57-year-old John Madden. The men developed a friendship, during which, with Madden's permission, O'Brien followed and photographed him for six months, where he documented Madden waiting in food lines, drinking with friends, sleeping in public spaces, and getting booked into jail. O'Brien's "vivid and empathic chronicle of homelessness" won a Robert F. Kennedy Journalism Award. In 1977, O'Brien won a second Robert F. Kennedy Journalism Award for "Culmer: The Tragic City", a photo essay of Miami's downtown ghetto. O'Brien has described his six years with The Miami News as "the favorite part of my career."

Magazine photography

Willie Nelson (1989)

In 1979, O'Brien moved to New York City and began his career as a freelance photographer. In 1980, LIFE magazine published his ten-page black-and-white photographic essay capturing the heroic efforts of Nurse Charlotte Sheehan at the Burn Center in New York Hospital. The following year, LIFE featured O'Brien's photographs of the deinstitutionalization of the mentally ill at Northampton State Hospital for its story, "Emptying the Madhouse: The Mentally Ill Have Become Our Cities Lost Souls".

O'Brien photographed subjects such as coal mining, Australian portraits, river oaks, and birding for feature stories in the National Geographic. In 1985, LIFE sent O'Brien to Austin, Texas, to photograph Willie Nelson. O'Brien returned to Texas in 1989 to shoot a cover story on Austin for National Geographic. The results helped National Geographic win a National Magazine Award for photography in 1991. The Smithsonian Museum acquired the 1989 portrait of Willie Nelson for the National Portrait Gallery. Joel Dinerstein, co-curator of an exhibit at the National Portrait Gallery called American Cool, commented on the iconic quality of O'Brien's Willie Nelson portrait: "It is done in colors as if he is part of the American landscape. It's so commemorative, it could be a stamp."

In 1988, O'Brien took on his first assignment for a major advertiser, photographing athletes in a Philadelphia locker room for Nike. He went on to work for such clients as Kodak, Apple Computer, Visa, Wrangler Jeans, and Bank of America. O'Brien stood out for using real people rather than models in costumes. For Apple's "What's on Your Powerbook Campaign", O'Brien photographed incongruous pairings of people holding laptops, including Todd Rundgren and Jesuit priest Don Doll. The result earned a CLIO Award and was later named by Photo District News (PDN) one of the best ad campaigns of the last 25 years.

Writing of O'Brien's aesthetic development through this period, Catherine Calhoun observed in Photo District News that O'Brien's "editorial work evolved in such a way that, by 1988, when he shot a pull-out, 28-image portfolio of Australians for National Geographic, his photographs had become thoughtfully composed pictures that combined passion with a hint of wit. His edgy black-and-white grit had been replaced by a soft, warm overall light and deeply saturated colors."

O'Brien is most acclaimed for his portraiture. Notable subjects photographed by O'Brien include LeBron James, Steven Spielberg, Samuel L. Jackson, Bill Cosby, Al Sharpton, Philip Glass, Don DeLillo, Warren Buffett, Chris Evert, Troy Aikman, Larry McMurtry, Sissy Spacek, George W. Bush, and Donald Trump. O'Brien's photographs have been published in magazines such as LIFE, Geo, The New York Times Magazine, Esquire, Fortune, Vanity Fair (magazine), Texas Monthly, and ESPN Magazine. "There's a simplicity in the way Michael has someone address the camera, and real purity to his light," comments D.J. Stout, Art Director of Texas Monthly Originally taken for a September 11, 1989, article of Fortune, O'Brien's photo of Donald Trump was later used as the cover for Trump's second book, Trump: Surviving at the Top. Although O'Brien's photo was donated to the National Portrait Gallery in 2011, the photo was later installed after Trump was elected the 45th President of the United States.

== Published works ==
=== The Face of Texas: Portraits of Texans ===
O'Brien was drawn to Texas and moved there in 1993. A decade later, he published his first collection of portraits, The Face of Texas: Portraits of Texans (Bright Sky Press, 2003). The book was a collaborative effort with former LIFE reporter Elizabeth Owen O'Brien (his spouse), who wrote brief, biographical stories to accompany each figure. The Face of Texas features nationally known figures such as Willie Nelson and George W. Bush side by side with lesser-known Texans like Shannon Perry, the 1989 Gatorfest Queen of Anahuac. A second edition of The Face of Texas, with 23 new portraits and additional stories, was published by The University of Texas Press (October 2014).

=== Hard Ground ===
O'Brien's second book, Hard Ground, is a collection of black-and-white portraits of homeless individuals, accompanied by poetry from singer-songwriter and co-author Tom Waits. O'Brien was the photographer for the cover of Waits' 2009 album, Glitter and Doom Live. The project began in 2006, when O'Brien began photographing homeless people using the services of Mobile Loaves and Fishes, a street ministry based in Austin, Texas. From there, O'Brien went on to take hundreds of photographs of people living on the streets of Austin.

O'Brien described the project as revisiting an earlier phase of his career: "It's the same issue I started out with in 1975," he said. "I am showing these people we walk past as real. I just have to try to get them to connect with me and the camera." To achieve the intimate effect he wanted, O'Brien used an old wooden-box view camera and Polaroid "Type 55" black-and-white film. "The abstract qualities of black and white," explains O'Brien, "convey emotion better and describe the subjects in a simple, elegant and consistent way." In addition, the Polaroid instant film created two images, a positive and a negative, allowing O'Brien to give his subjects a photograph on the spot while retaining the negatives for scanning.

Reviewing the book, John Loengard commented, "We meet O'Brien's people one on one. Their 'otherness' is removed. The photographs engender compassion and empathy. If that sounds simple, it is because it is simple. And, as anyone knows, being simple is very, very difficult. Hard Ground is a rare and powerful book."

=== The Great Minds of Investing ===
In 1988, Michael O'Brien was sent by Esquire Magazine to photograph Warren Buffett. The portrait also appeared on the cover of Roger Lowenstein's Buffett: The Making of an American Capitalist (1995) and was acquired by the Smithsonian National Portrait Gallery (United States) for their permanent collection in 2009. At the end of the shoot, Buffett handed his photographer "homework," a stack of Berkshire Hathaway annual reports. O'Brien read Buffett's letter to his shareholders which left him "a devoted student of Buffett" and planted the seed for this project. In 2010, O'Brien photographed the iconoclastic thinker, Charlie Munger, and over the next five years he traveled around the world taking portraits of prominent investors. Journalist William Green was brought on to write short profiles. "I was thrilled to join forces with him because his portraits have a wonderful intimacy and humanity to them. When you look into the eyes of someone like Buffett or Munger or Bill Miller, you feel as if you're looking into their souls because they are so deeply engaged with the camera."

== Exhibits ==
Michael O'Brien's photo prints are in the permanent collections of the Harry Ransom Humanities Research Center at the University of Texas at Austin, Birmingham Museum of Art, International Center of Photography in New York City, The Tennessee State Museum, and the Wittliff collections of Southwestern and Mexican Photography at Texas State University. Between 2009 and 2011, the Smithsonian Institution's National Portrait Gallery in Washington, D.C., acquired 18 of O'Brien's portraits including Warren Buffett (1988), Larry McMurtry, Howard Finster, Don DeLillo, and Rob Reiner. O'Brien's portrait of Willie Nelson was included in American Cool, an exhibition at the National Portrait Gallery (Feb 7 – Sept 7, 2014).

== Bibliography ==
- Hard Ground, University of Texas Press (2011), ISBN 978-0-292726-49-9
- The Face of Texas: Portraits of Texans, Bright Sky Press (2003), ISBN 978-1-931721-23-3
- The Great Minds of Investing, FinanzBuch Verlag (2015), ISBN 978-3-898799-24-9
