= The Onion =

American satire news organization

- America's Finest News Source
- The Onion's logo

- Cover of the November 6, 2024, issue
- Type: Satirical newspaper
- Format: Website
- Owner: Global Tetrahedron
- Founders: Tim Keck; Christopher Johnson
- Editor: Chad Nackers
- Founded: August 29, 1988; 38 years ago Madison, Wisconsin, U.S.
- Ceased publication: December 13, 2013 (print)
- Relaunched: August 16, 2024 (print)
- Headquarters: Chicago, Illinois, U.S.
- Circulation: Approximately 85,000 (print, 2026)
- Website: theonion.com

The Onion is an American digital media company and newspaper organization that publishes satirical articles on international, national, and local news. The company is currently based in Chicago, but originated as a weekly print publication on August 29, 1988, in Madison, Wisconsin. The Onion began publishing online in early 1996. In 2007, they began publishing satirical news audio and video online as the Onion News Network. In 2013, The Onion stopped publishing its print edition. It was then acquired three times, first by Univision in 2016, which later merged The Onion and several other publications into those of Gizmodo Media Group. This unit was sold in 2019 to Great Hill Partners, forming a new company named G/O Media. Then, in April 2024, G/O Media sold The Onion to Global Tetrahedron, a firm newly created by former Twilio CEO Jeff Lawson, which revived the print edition in August that year.

The Onion's articles cover real and fictional current events, parodying the tone and format of traditional news organizations with stories, editorials, and street interviews using a traditional news website layout and an editorial voice modeled after that of the Associated Press. The publication's humor often depends on presenting mundane, everyday events as newsworthy, surreal, or alarming, such as "Rotation Of Earth Plunges Entire North American Continent Into Darkness". In 1999, comedian Bob Odenkirk praised the publication as "the best comedy writing in the country".

The Onion previously ran The A.V. Club, a non-satirical entertainment and pop culture publication founded in 1993 that contains interviews and reviews of newly released media and other weekly features, and ClickHole, a satirical website founded in 2014 which parodies clickbait websites. ClickHole was acquired by Cards Against Humanity in February 2020 while The A.V. Club was acquired by Paste magazine in March 2024.

== History ==
=== Madison (1988–2001) ===
In 1988, The Onion was founded as a weekly print newspaper for satirical news by University of Wisconsin–Madison students Tim Keck and Christopher Johnson. Keck's parents had both worked on The Hammond Times newspaper, and he had previously partnered with cartoonist James Sturm to sell monthly calendars featuring characters from Sturm's comics in The Daily Cardinal student newspaper. The idea for a newspaper of fake stories came from The Daily Cardinal's annual April Fools' Day parody issue. Keck claims that Johnson's uncle suggested naming the newspaper The Onion because of their frequent consumption of onion sandwiches, early comic contributor Scott Dikkers maintains that it referred to "newspaper slang in the 1930s for a juicy, multi-layered story," and editor Cole Bolton insists that it mocked the campus bulletin The Union, alongside which early issues appeared.

In 1989, Keck and Johnson sold the paper to Dikkers; Peter Haise, their advertising manager; and Jonnie Wilder, their typesetter, for $16,000 ($19,000 according to some sources). After the sale, Keck and Johnson separately became publishers of similar alternative weeklies: Keck of The Stranger in Seattle, and Johnson of the Weekly Alibi in Albuquerque, New Mexico. In late 1990, Wilder sold her shares for $15,000 to work at the board game publisher Iron Crown Enterprises. Haise left The Onion after 15 years and eventually opened a custom framing shop in Wauwatosa, Wisconsin. Dikkers claimed he was de facto editor by the third issue and became The Onion's longest-serving editor-in-chief (1988–1999, 2005–2008).

In The Onion's earlier years, it was successful in a number of university locations (e.g., University of Wisconsin–Madison and University of Illinois at Urbana–Champaign). The publication primarily consisted of a mix of Dikkers's cartoons, Spy magazine-like satire, and short fiction. The bottom three inches were reserved as ad space for coupons that were typically purchased by local, student-centered or inexpensive establishments, such as eateries and video rental stores.

In the summer of 1993, Stephen Thompson founded and became editor of the paper's genuine entertainment section, which was dubbed The A.V. Club in 1995. In a 1994 interview with U. Magazine, Dikkers discussed Onion, Inc.'s plans to create a new sketch comedy show called The Comedy Castaways, which they were in the process of pitching to NBC, Fox, and HBO. With a pilot and the first two episodes in post-production, Dikkers said, "I think what sets us apart is we've intentionally formed a tightly knit group of funny performers. A lot of these other shows are created by 50-year-olds, written by 40-year-olds and performed by 35-year-olds".

In 1995, Dave and Jeff Haupt sold their shares of Cisco to purchase a $25,000 license to franchise The Onion in Denver. The publication also licensed The Onion's content for between $200 and $500 a week. According to the Haupts, the staff in the paper's Chicago office were known to smoke marijuana while watching Cubs games on television. But the Haupts and their partner, Dave Rogers, assembled a more business-focused staff. While other editions of The Onion ran pages of stories there were not enough ads to support, the Haupts cut content to avoid losses. It was a deal many at The Onion eventually regretted. There were blowups when the Haupts refused to run especially biting headlines or when they made changes to the paper's layout. "We might have been selling humor, but the business behind it was always very serious to us. The rest of The Onion was a complete disaster."

In the spring of 1996, Ben Karlin and Dikkers collaborated with Robert Smigel and Dana Carvey to create four short Onion news segments for The Dana Carvey Show. Smigel said that after being introduced to The Onion by Bob Odenkirk a year earlier, "it jumped out at me as something completely original and great, and I really wanted to use it on the show". Although four fake news segments anchored by Stephen Colbert were recorded, only one of the segments actually aired.

In response to other websites copying Onion print articles without attribution, graphic designer Jack Szwergold launched an online version of The Onion in May 1996. Amid the dot-com boom, high revenue from online advertising allowed the newspaper to professionalize with formal positions and salaries. In a 2002 interview, then-editor in chief Rob Siegel said, "If you look at the breakdown of people who read The Onion online, it's like Microsoft, Dell Computers, the Department of Justice and then, like, University of Wisconsin. So it's a combination of students and pretty impressive people. I get the feeling that the print version is read by people hanging out in bars".

The website also increased The Onion's global recognition. Soon after its launch, the article "Dying Boy Gets Wish: To Pork Janet Jackson" prompted a lawsuit from the singer's legal team, which was settled by issuing a letter of apology in the following issue and providing a complimentary subscription. In March 1999, The Onion's website won its first Webby Award in the category of "Humor".

In the fall of 1996, Ben Karlin, who had been a writer and editor for the publication since graduating from the University of Wisconsin in 1993, moved to Los Angeles and joined other former Onion staff members to create a pilot for a news parody titled Deadline: Now for the Fox Network. The 15-minute pilot was completed in 1997, but it was never picked up for production. However, its creation led to steady writing work for Karlin and other former Onion staffers, such as writing some episodes of Space Ghost Coast to Coast on the Cartoon Network. In the wake of Karlin's departure, Siegel took over as editor of the publication, for which he was paid $400 per week. In January 1999, when Jon Stewart became the host of The Daily Show, he chose Karlin to be head writer of the newly restructured show.

On January 27, 1998, MTV premiered Virtual Bill, a collaboration between writers of The Onion and 3-D character studio Protozoa. The titular "Virtual Bill" character was a quasi-realistic CGI version of Bill Clinton created by studio Protozoa who introduced music videos and told jokes written by the staff of The Onion. The voice of Virtual Bill was provided by then-editor Dikkers. After the initial premiere, Virtual Bill returned to MTV on December 17, 1998, with another TV special and an interactive web special produced by Pulse that ported the 3D data into a web compatible format using Pulse's proprietary plug-in.

From March 3 to 7, 1999, Onion staff attended The Comedy Festival in Aspen, Colorado to promote their Our Dumb Century book. The newspaper was met with effusive praise from notable comedians like Conan O'Brien, Dave Foley and Dave Thomas, as well as cartoonist Peter Bagge and musician Andy Prieboy. The book released on March 23, 1999, featuring mocked-up newspaper front pages from across the 20th century, presented as if the publication had been continuously in print since before 1900. In the wake of the book's success, networks such as HBO and NBC were in talks to bring The Onion to TV with a special based on Our Dumb Century. Despite nearly two years of work spent on conceiving and producing Our Dumb Century, the writers received only $1,300 in bonuses, despite the fact that the two-book publishing deal netted The Onion $450,000.

In April 2000, DreamWorks Studios optioned two stories from the satirical newspaper, "Canadian Girlfriend Unsubstantiated"—which was to be written by former Onion editor and writer Rich Dahm—and "Tenth Circle Added to Rapidly Growing Hell" with an eye toward producing the latter as a family comedy. "The story is so dark and hate filled—I was shocked", said head writer Todd Hanson. "It's like an Onion joke. I mean, what are they going to do? Add a sickly-but-adorable moppet?" added editor Robert Siegel. DreamWorks planned for the finished "Tenth Circle Added to Rapidly Growing Hell" to involve animation as well as musical singalongs. The following year, Miramax signed a first-look deal with The Onion, but it never agreed to any films.

In June 2000, writers and editors of The Onion participated in a Comedy Central panel discussion moderated by Jeff Greenfield titled "The State of The Onion" during the "Toyota Comedy Festival 2000". The following month, editor Robert Siegel was named one of People magazine's most eligible bachelors.

=== New York City (2001–2012) ===
In April 2000, a $12 million deal for Comedy Central to acquire The Onion fell through amid the dot-com crash. In frustration, Dikkers sold his shares to David Schafer, who managed investments for Strong Capital Management. Writers conditioned their acceptance of the deal on joining the owners in New York City, while writers for The A.V. Club would remain in Madison, Wisconsin. Agreeing that the move would allow The Onion to expand into a full production company of books, television, and movies, Haise and Schafer chose a former furniture warehouse in the Chelsea neighborhood of Manhattan. The planned launch of the New York City print edition on September 16, 2001, was postponed due to the September 11 attacks. The rewritten issue debuted on September 27 and was widely praised for bringing humor to a recent tragedy, doubling the website's online traffic in the following weeks.

In November 2002, a humorous op-ed piece in The Onion that was satirically bylined by filmmaker Michael Bay titled "Those Chechen Rebels Stole My Idea" was removed from the site without explanation. Entertainment industry trade magazine Variety theorized, "It's not clear if Bay—a frequent object of The Onion's satire—requested the move."

In 2003, editor Robert Siegel quit his day-to-day role at The Onion to focus on writing screenplays full-time. "After the 14,000th headline I felt the itch to use a different part of my brain", he said. "You can go mad thinking in headline form." In the wake of his departure, long-time staff writer Carol Kolb took over as editor of the publication.

Unable to support The Onion's rising costs, Haise sold his ownership shares to Schafer for $1.7 million in April 2003. Schafer appointed journalist Steve Hannah as The Onion's new CEO, who quickly faced criticism for being too old to understand its satire. In 2005, The Onion moved its New York City offices from its initial Chelsea location to downtown on Broadway in the SoHo neighborhood of Manhattan. That same year, Kolb resigned to work in television writing, leading Hannah to rehire Dikkers as editor-in-chief.

In 2006, The Onion had reached a print circulation of 549,000; it was distributed for free in several cities. The same year, it launched a YouTube channel, which was structured as a parody of modern American television news programs. In June 2006, it was also announced that Siegel had been tapped by Miramax Films to write the screenplay for a comedy titled "Homeland Insecurity" which was slated to be about a pair of Arab-Americans who are mistaken for terrorists while traveling to Texas.

In July 2006, business media began reporting that Viacom intended to acquire The Onion. After the sale price was rejected by Onion executives, the company began expanding with unpaid interns to appear larger to potential buyers.

In April 2007, The Onion launched Onion News Network, a parody of "the visual style and breathless reporting of 24-hour cable news networks like CNN." In 2008, Kolb returned as head writer of Onion News Network, while Dikkers handed off editorial control of The Onion itself to Joe Randazzo. Randazzo first became a writer for The Onion in 2006 and became the first Onion editor with no connection to its initial era in Madison.

In November 2009, The Onion released Our Front Pages: 21 Years of Greatness, Virtue, and Moral Rectitude From America's Finest News Source which was notable in not only compiling dozens of front pages from the publication's history as a news parody but also showcasing front pages from the publication's early, more casual campus humor focused era during the 1980s when the publication featured headlines such as, "Depressed? Try Liposuction on that Pesky Head."

In July 2009, The Onion satirized media consolidation by leaking false rumors that the newspaper would be sold, which was widely reported by other outlets. Fictional Publisher Emeritus T. Herman Zweibel (portrayed by Dikkers) announced that he had sold the publication to a Chinese company—Yu Wan Mei Corporation—resulting in a week-long series of China-related articles throughout The Onion's website and print editions. On July 22, 2009, editor Joe Randazzo clarified on NPR's All Things Considered that "we are, in fact, still a solvent independently owned American company."

In August 2011, The Onion's website began testing a paywall model, requiring a $2.95 monthly/$29.95 annual charge from non-U.S. visitors who wish to read more than about five stories within 30 days. "We are testing a meter internationally as readers in those markets are already used to paying directly for some (other) content, particularly in the UK where we have many readers", said the company's CTO Michael Greer.

In September 2011, The Onion announced that it would move its editorial operations to Chicago, joining its corporate headquarters. That year, Onion News Network launched on television, and it was a major source of revenue amid diminished newspaper advertising in the aftermath of the 2008 financial crisis. Chicago and Illinois offered tax breaks for Internet video production, while New York City unions had bargained high wages for Onion writers.

The move blindsided Onion writers, and they threatened to collectively resign. Writer Baratunde Thurston organized "Project Allium" (named after the Allium genus of onions) to have business incubator Betaworks acquire The Onion. Hannah responded by rejecting Betaworks' offer and convincing Dikkers to return as General Manager and Vice President of Creative Development to maintain the appearance of continuity. Around 85% of the staff resigned, including Randazzo.

=== Chicago (2012–present) ===
With the publication's core editorial staff now based in Chicago, in March 2012 Cole Bolton—a Brown University graduate of business economics, former associate economist at the Federal Reserve Bank of Chicago, and research associate at Harvard Business School—was named the new editor-in-chief of The Onion. "I was never in an improv group, never in a sketch group, never wrote for an Onion parody in college", said Bolton in a 2014 interview with comedy publication SplitSider. "It was just sort of a decision that I decided, two years out of college, that I didn't like where I was going in my life, and I wanted to do something that I cared about more, so I ended up just sending stuff in to The Onion."

Additionally, in March 2012 more insight into the internal issues surrounding the Chicago move—including an attempt made by the writers to find a new owner—are explored by articles in The Atlantic Wire and New York magazine's Daily Intelligencer. According to an article in the Chicago Tribune, founding editor Scott Dikkers returned to the publication in light of the Chicago move stating that he hopes to find a "younger and hungrier" pool of talent in Chicago than what was available in New York City. "The Onion is obviously always going to draw talent from wherever it is", Dikkers said. "In Madison, people used to just come in off the street [...] and we'd give them a shot. The Onion has always thrived on the youngest, greenest people."

In August 2012, it was announced that a group of former The Onion writers had teamed up with Adult Swim to create comedy content on a website called Thing X. According to the comedy website SplitSider, "The Onion writers had nothing else going on, and AdultSwim.com wanted to take advantage of that. But only because they smelled a business opportunity. Adult Swim is just looking at it from a business standpoint." In June 2013, it was announced that Thing X would be shutting down with some staff moving over to parent website adultswim.com on June 18, 2013. In February 2013 The Onion was added to Advertising Age's "Digital A-List 2013" because the publication "...has not just survived, it's thrived..." since the publication's 2012 move to consolidate operations and staff in Chicago.

In November 2013, the publication announced in Crain's Chicago Business that The Onion would move to an all-digital format by December 2013, citing a 30% year-over-year growth in page views to the publication's website. The final print edition was published on December 13, 2013.

In 2013, The Onion received an email from Michael Cohen claiming that an article published about Donald Trump was defamation. Cohen demanded that it be removed with an apology.

In June 2014, The Onion launched the spinoff website ClickHole, which satirizes and parodies so-called "clickbait" websites such as BuzzFeed and Upworthy that capitalize on viral content to drive traffic. On September 21, 2015, StarWipe launched as a satirical spinoff of The A.V. Club centered on celebrity culture. It was closed on June 17, 2016.

In November 2014, Bloomberg News reported that The Onion had hired a financial adviser for a possible sale. In June 2015, Hannah was replaced as CEO by Mike McAvoy, who he had hired a decade earlier as a financial controller. The following year, he oversaw restructuring to reduce non-media roles in response to declining demand.

==== Univision Communications / G/O Media ownership (2016–2024) ====
In January 2016, Univision Communications purchased a 40% stake in Onion, Inc. for between $85–100 million. The Onion and Gizmodo Media Group was merged into Univision's Fusion Media Group with the former undergoing a visual overhaul to match Gizmodo's branding.

In January 2017, The Onion partnered with Lionsgate Films and production company Serious Business to develop multiple film projects. "We've plotted our takeover of the film industry for some time", said Kyle Ryan, vice president of Onion Studios. "With the help of Serious Business and Lionsgate, we'll make room on our award shelf for some Oscars. To the basement you go, Pulitzers." Serious Business is a production company run by former UTA Online co-founder Jason U. Nadler, @midnight co-creator Jon Zimelis and writer/producer Alex Blagg.

In September 2017, the site's editor-in-chief Cole Bolton and executive editor Ben Berkley stepped down to join Elon Musk's Thud, which folded after Musk pulled funding the following year over fears that it would satirize his own companies. Chad Nackers was elevated from head writer to editor-in-chief and is now the only remaining member from The Onion's Madison era. The departures were partially due to disagreements about the direction the site was taking under the ownership of Univision.

In April 2018 the employees of the company unionized with The Writers Guild Of America, East. The union comprises "all of the creative staffs at Onion Inc.: The A.V. Club, The Onion, ClickHole, The Takeout, Onion Labs, and Onion Inc.'s video and art departments." and reached a contract agreement with management on December 20, 2018.

In July 2018, Univision laid off 15% of Onion staff to support a sale of Onion Inc. and Gizmodo Media Group. On April 8, 2019, private equity firm Great Hill Partners acquired Onion Inc. and Gizmodo Media Group from Univision for an undisclosed amount to form G/O Media. In March 2024, G/O Media sold The A.V. Club to Paste magazine and was reported to be seeking buyers for The Onion.

==== Global Tetrahedron ownership, attempted purchase and unofficial relaunch of InfoWars (2024–present) ====
Proposed logo for InfoWars if acquisition by Global Tetrahedron is approved

On April 25, 2024, G/O Media CEO Jim Spanfeller told employees that G/O Media had sold The Onion to Chicago firm Global Tetrahedron, which is owned by Twilio founder Jeff Lawson, with former NBC News reporter Ben Collins as CEO. As a condition of the deal, the new owners said they would retain the website's staff and keep it based in Chicago. "Global Tetrahedron" is taken from a "fictional evil megacorporation" that has been the subject of a running gag since Our Dumb Century. New leaders at the company also included Danielle Strle as chief product officer and Leila Brillson as chief marketing officer. Global Tetrahedron promised that the buyers would continue to honor Onion staffers' union contract, and that Onion employees would be part of a revenue sharing plan. Under Global Tetrahedron ownership, The Onion redesigned its website, dropping Kinja and carrying significantly less advertising, and launched a subscription that included a new monthly print edition in August 2024. Onion News Network, which had not released new content since 2015, returned in September 2024, with former MSNBC host Joshua Johnson portraying anchor Dwight Richmond.

On November 14, 2024, through a bankruptcy auction, Global Tetrahedron attempted to purchase Infowars, a conspiratorial far-right website founded by Alex Jones. Collins stated that Global Tetrahedron's intent was to turn Infowars into a parody of Jones's conspiracy theories, adding genuine gun violence prevention information to the site as well. The purchase was supported by families of the victims of the Sandy Hook Elementary School shooting, who had successfully sued Jones for defamation. The purchase was initially halted the following day, and on December 10, the federal bankruptcy judge overseeing Jones's case, Christopher Lopez, rejected the sale, concluding that the bidding process was flawed. Lopez ordered an evidentiary hearing regarding the auction, saying "I'm going to figure out exactly what happened" and that "no one should feel comfortable with the results of this auction." No date was immediately set for a new auction, and in early 2025 the bankruptcy court rejected the purchase attempt, as Infowars's parent company was no longer in bankruptcy and thus the website was no longer an asset eligible for auction through the court.

On April 20, 2026, The Onion announced that, pending approval from Texas state judge Maya Guerra Gamble, it had reached an agreement to officially take over Infowars. On April 30, a Texas appeals court panel blocked the takeover, citing objections raised by Jones's legal team. Jones characterized the ruling as a "massive victory", but both Jones and Collins said that Infowars would have to cease broadcasting by midnight because no one had paid the state-appointed receiver to rent the studio and website.

Despite the ongoing legal battles preventing them from taking over Infowars's assets, The Onion's version of InfoWars (stylized with a capital W) launched July 2, 2026, with new shows from former Onion News Network anchor Jim Haggerty and InfoWars creative director Tim Heidecker. Heidecker stated his goal with InfoWars is to turn it into an internet comedy brand that "erases Jones' legacy", producing both short-form and long-form content. By August 2026, The Onion had given $100,000 from merchandise sales to families of victims of the Sandy Hook Elementary School shooting.

== Print edition ==
During The Onion print edition's initial 25-year run—from the publication's creation in 1988 to the end of the print edition in 2013—it was distributed for free in various cities across the United States and Canada as well as via paid mail order subscription to subscribers around the world. By the time the print edition of The Onion ceased publication in December 2013, it was only available in Chicago, Milwaukee and Providence. At its peak, The Onion had a print circulation of about 500,000 while the publication's websites brought in more than 10 million unique monthly visitors. Below is a list of all of the cities in which The Onion was distributed freely at different points from 1988 to 2013.

- Ann Arbor, Michigan
- Austin, Texas
- Boulder, Colorado
- Champaign–Urbana, Illinois
- Chicago, Illinois
- Columbus, Ohio
- Denver, Colorado
- Indianapolis, Indiana
- Iowa City, Iowa
- Los Angeles, California
- Madison, Wisconsin
- Milwaukee, Wisconsin
- Minneapolis–Saint Paul, Minnesota
- New York City, New York
- Omaha, Nebraska
- Philadelphia, Pennsylvania
- Pittsburgh, Pennsylvania
- Providence, Rhode Island
- San Francisco, California
- Santa Fe, New Mexico
- Toronto, Ontario, Canada
- Washington, D.C.

The Onion revived its print edition in August 2024, as a paid subscription with monthly issues. To promote the relaunch, The Onion printed a special 40,000-copy run for the 2024 Democratic National Convention that month, which was held in their headquarters city of Chicago. In 2025, The Onion was made available for purchase from most Barnes & Noble Newsstands. As of August 2026, the print edition of The Onion had around 85,000 subscribers.

== Regular features ==
Regular features of The Onion include:

- "Statshot", an illustrated statistical snapshot which parodies "USA Today Snapshots".
- "Infographics", with a bulleted lists of jokes on a theme.
- Opinion columns, including mock editorials, point-counterpoints, and pieces from regular (fictional) columnists, including Jean Teasdale and Herbert Kornfeld (originated by Maria Schneider), Jim Anchower and Jackie Harvey (originated by Joe Garden), Larry Groznic, Smoove B, and Gorzo the Mighty.
- Bizarre horoscopes.
- Slideshows that parody content aggregation sites like Huffington Post and Buzzfeed, usually accompanied by a "click-bait"-style headline.
- "News in Photos" that feature a photograph and caption with no accompanying story.
- "American Voices" (formerly called "What Do You Think?"), a mock vox populi survey on a topical current event. There are three respondents—down from the original six—for each topic, who appear to represent a diverse selection of demographics. Although their names and professions change each time they are used, the same six pictures have been reused weekly for over 20 years. The photos belong to people that happened to be near the publication's old office in Madison: one is a Madison community theater actor, one used to work with The Onion's CEO Chad Nackers at a restaurant, one delivered goods for UPS, and one is Mark Danielson's aunt.
- An editorial cartoon drawn by "Kelly" (also referred to as "Stan Kelly"), a fictional cartoonist. The cartoons are actually the work of artist Ward Sutton and they are a deadpan parody of conservative editorial cartoons, as well as editorial cartoons in general. Many of the cartoons feature the Statue of Liberty, usually shedding a single tear—of joy or anguish—depending on the situation.
- A Person of the Year award. For example, in 1996 the Denorex Man was chosen. For 2014, the Onion honored Malala Yousafzai and John Cena.
- "'No Way to Prevent This', Says Only Nation Where This Regularly Happens", a story republished with minor edits after major mass shootings in the United States. The story was first published in response to the 2014 Isla Vista killings.

== Editors and writers ==
Chad Nackers has served as editor-in-chief of The Onion since 2017. Past editors and writers have included:

- Max Cannon
- Rich Dahm
- Scott Dikkers
- Megan Ganz
- Joe Garden
- Todd Hanson
- Tim Harrod
- David Javerbaum
- Ben Karlin
- Ellie Kemper
- Peter Koechley
- Carol Kolb
- Joe Randazzo
- Maria Schneider
- Robert D. Siegel
- Jack Szwergold
- Baratunde Thurston
- Dan Vebber

== Books, video, film and audio ==
=== Books ===
Since the first publication of Our Dumb Century in 1999, The Onion has produced various books that often compile already produced material into collected volumes. Its other fully original book content includes Our Dumb World (2007) and The Onion Book of Known Knowledge (2012).

- The Onion (March 23, 1999). Our Dumb Century: The Onion Presents 100 Years of Headlines from America's Finest News Source. Three Rivers Press. ISBN 978-0609804612.
- The Onion (April 4, 2000). The Onion's Finest News Reporting, Volume 1. Three Rivers Press. ISBN 978-0609804636.
- The Onion (September 4, 2001). Dispatches from the Tenth Circle: The Best of The Onion. Three Rivers Press. ISBN 978-0609808344.
- The Onion (September 24, 2002). The Onion Ad Nauseam: Complete News Archives, Volume 13. Three Rivers Press. ISBN 978-1400047246.
- The Onion (September 23, 2003). The Onion Ad Nauseam: Complete News Archives, Volume 14. Three Rivers Press. ISBN 978-1400049615.
- The Onion (September 28, 2004). Fanfare for the Area Man: The Onion Ad Nauseam Complete News Archives, Vol. 15. Three Rivers Press. ISBN 978-1400054558.
- The Onion (October 4, 2005). Embedded in America: The Onion Complete News Archives Volume 16. Three Rivers Press. ISBN 978-1400054565.
- The Onion (October 31, 2006). Homeland Insecurity: The Onion Complete News Archives, Volume 17. Three Rivers Press. ISBN 978-0307339843.
- The Onion (October 30, 2007). Our Dumb World: The Onion's Atlas of the Planet Earth, 73rd Edition. Little, Brown And Company. ISBN 978-0316018425.
- The Onion (November 3, 2009). Our Front Pages: 21 Years of Greatness, Virtue, and Moral Rectitude from America's Finest News Source. Scribner. ISBN 978-1439156926.
- The Onion (October 11, 2011). The Ecstasy of Defeat: Sports Reporting at Its Finest by the Editors of the Onion. Hachette Books. ISBN 978-1401310721.
- The Onion (October 23, 2012). The Onion Book of Known Knowledge: A Definitive Encyclopaedia Of Existing Information. Little, Brown and Company. ISBN 978-0316133265.
- The Onion (November 2014). The Onion Magazine The Iconic Covers That Transformed An Undeserving World. Little, Brown and Company. ISBN 978-0-316-25645-2.
- The Onion (October 2017). The Trump Leaks: The Onion Exposes the Top Secret Memos, Emails, and Doodles That Could Take Down a President. Harper Design. ISBN 978-0062834263.

=== Onion News Network ===
In April 2007, The Onion launched Onion News Network—a daily web video broadcast—with a story about an illegal immigrant taking an executive's $800,000-a-year job for $600,000 a year, directed by Dikkers. The publication reportedly initially invested $1 million in the production and hired 15 new staffers. On February 3, 2009, The Onion launched a spin-off of the Onion News Network called the Onion Sports Network. In April 2009, the program was awarded a Peabody Award noting that the publication provides "ersatz news that has a worrisome ring of truth."

In a Wikinews interview in November 2007, former Onion President Mills said the Onion News Network had been a huge hit. "We get over a million downloads a week, which makes it one of the more successful produced-for-the-Internet videos", said Mills. "If we're not the most successful, we're one of the most." In January 2011, The Onion launched two TV shows on cable networks: Onion SportsDome which premiered January 11 on Comedy Central, and the Onion News Network which premiered January 21 on Independent Film Channel (IFC). Later in the year IFC officially announced the renewal of the Onion News Network for a second season in March 2011 while Comedy Central officially announced the cancellation of Onion SportsDome in June 2011.

In August 2011, the Writers Guild of America, East, AFL–CIO, announced the unionization of the Onion News Network writing staff, averting a potential strike which hinged on pay and benefits. It is also not the first time Onion, Inc. has been criticized for the way it treats its employees: In June 2011 A.V. Club Philadelphia city editor Emily Guendelsberger was the victim of an attack and—according to the Philadelphia Daily News—her job did not provide health insurance to cover hospital bills. According to the WGA, Onion News Network was the only scripted, live-action program that had employed non-union writers. "The ONN writers stood together and won real improvements", said WGAE Executive Director Lowell Peterson. "We welcome them into the WGAE and we look forward to a productive relationship with the company." Peterson noted that more than 70 Guild members from all of the New York-based comedy shows signed a letter supporting the Onion News Network writers, and hundreds of Guild members sent emails to the producers.

In March 2012, IFC officially announced the cancellation of the Onion News Network. After the show's cancellation, a pilot for a new comedy series titled Onion News Empire premiered on Amazon.com in April 2013, which presented as a behind-the-scenes look of The Onion's newsroom. The pilot was one of several candidates for production on Amazon, but was not ultimately selected. In September 2024, The Onion relaunched the Onion News Network on its YouTube page, starring former MSNBC host Joshua Johnson as ONN anchor Dwight Richmond.

=== Video series ===
- Today Now!: a series of parodies of a morning talk show
- Onion Film Standard with Peter K. Rosenthal: a series of parodies in which "Movie critic Peter K. Rosenthal" (played by Ron E. Rains) presents his views on famous films, both classic and contemporary.
- Onion Social: a series of parodies of Facebook
- In the Know with Clifford Banes: a series of parodies of a news talk show
- Mothershould with Grace Manning-Devlin: a series of parodies of women's issues YouTube vlogs
- The Whole Body: a series of parodies of health tips
- Good Taste: a series of parodies of Recipe and cooking videos
- EDGE: a series of parodies of the HBO non-fiction TV series VICE
- Owner's Box: a series of parodies of ESPN and other sports-news programs
- Sportology: a series of parodies of investigation of sport science
- O-Span: a series of parodies of C-SPAN
- Now: Focus: a series of parodies of NowThis News
- Onion Explains: a series of parodies of WIRED Explains
- Onion Insights: a series of parodies of Vox videos

==== Onion Digital Studios ====
In 2008, The Onion launched a series of YouTube videos produced by its 'Onion Digital Studios' division, funded in part by a grant from YouTube and exclusive to the site.

Series produced were:

- Sex House: A dark satire of reality show culture and negligent producers.
- Lake Dredge Appraisal: A show centering on the dredged salvage of a lake, appraised of its worth on public access television.
- Trouble Hacking with Drew Cleary: A mock Life Hacking Q and A series.
- Horrifying Planet: A nihilistic parody of nature documentaries.
- Onion Talks: A satire of TED Talks.
- Porkin' Across America with Jim Haggerty: An on-the-road food reality show featuring Jim Haggerty from Today Now.
- America's Best: An American Idol parody.
- Dr. Good: Parody of The Dr. Oz Show.

=== Mockumentaries ===
Official trailer for the mockumentary Jeffrey Epstein: Bad Pedophile.

- Jeffrey Epstein: Bad Pedophile: A 20-minute mockumentary of Jeffrey Epstein.

limited release on October 2, 2025 in independent theaters, after a theater chain withdrew
available online as The Onion Investigates: Jeffrey Epstein

=== The Onion Movie ===
The Onion Movie is a direct-to-video film written by then-Onion editor Robert Siegel and writer Todd Hanson and directed by Tom Kuntz and Mike Maguire. Created in 2003, Fox Searchlight Pictures was on board to release the movie, originally called The Untitled Onion Movie, but at some point in the process, directors Kuntz and Maguire—as well as writer Siegel—walked away from the project. In 2006, New Regency Productions took over the production of the troubled project. After two years of being in limbo, the film was released directly on DVD on June 3, 2008. Upon release, it was credited as being directed by James Kleiner, a pseudonym for Kuntz and Maguire.

In Spring 2014, early employee and former shareholder, Peter K. Haise, sued majority shareholder, David K. Schafer, in Palm Beach County over not being listed as an "Executive Producer" in the film's credits, despite that being a condition of his 2003 transfer of ownership. The lawsuit was ultimately settled with Haise claiming an undisclosed financial victory.

=== Onion Radio News ===
The Onion Radio News was an audio podcast/radio show produced by The Onion from 1999 and 2009. The core voice of the podcast was that of a fictional newsreader named "Doyle Redland" who was voiced by Pete S. Mueller. At its peak Onion Radio News was picked up by the Westwood One radio network as well as Audible.com.

=== Onion Public Radio podcasts ===
On February 5, 2018, The Onion published its first podcast, titled A Very Fatal Murder. It was released in six parts and parodies other true crime podcasts such as Serial and My Favorite Murder. The story follows Onion Public Radio reporter David Pascall (voiced by David Sidorov) as he tries to investigate the murder of a 17-year-old girl named Hayley Price in the fictional town of Bluff Springs, Nebraska.

On January 16, 2020, The Onion expanded its podcast formula to include The Topical, in a partnership with Sony Music. The Topical was a satirical news podcast which parodies the style and format of NPR drive-time news broadcasts and The Daily by The New York Times. It was hosted by a fictional Leslie Price, with its final episode on May 20, 2021.

The Onion launched The Tim Heidecker Podcast in October 2026, a parody of The Joe Rogan Experience starring comedian Tim Heidecker.

== Influence and controversies ==
=== Taken seriously ===
Occasionally, the straight-faced manner in which The Onion reports non-existent events, happenings and ideas has resulted in third parties mistakenly citing The Onion stories as real news.

- "'98 Homosexual-Recruitment Drive Nearing Goal": In 1998, Fred Phelps posted an article from The Onion article on his Westboro Baptist Church website as apparent "proof" that homosexuals were indeed actively trying to "recruit" others to be gay.
- "Congress Passes Americans With No Abilities Act": At various times since the article's initial publication in 1998, variants of the "Americans With No Abilities Act" article and theme have been passed around online including a variant in 2009 that changed the stated U.S. president from Bill Clinton to Barack Obama as well as a 2007 variant that changed the country from the United States of America to Australia.
- "Harry Potter Books Spark Rise in Satanism Among Children": Beginning in the year 2000, an article on Harry Potter inciting children to practice witchcraft was the subject of a widely forwarded email which repeated the quotes attributed to children in the article. Columnist Ellen Makkai and others who believe the Harry Potter books "recruit" children to Satanism have also been taken in by the article, using quotes directly from it to support their claims.
- "Congress Threatens To Leave D.C. Unless New Capitol Is Built": On June 7, 2002, Reuters reported that the Beijing Evening News republished and translated portions of the article. The article is a parody of U.S. sports franchises' threats to leave their home city unless new stadiums are built for them. The Beijing Evening News initially stood by the story, demanding proof of its falsehood but later retracted the article, responding that "some small American newspapers frequently fabricate offbeat news to trick people into noticing them with the aim of making money."
- "Conspiracy Theorist Convinces Neil Armstrong Moon Landing Was Faked": In September 2009, two Bangladeshi newspapers—The Daily Manab Zamin and the New Nation—published stories translated from The Onion claiming that astronaut Neil Armstrong had held a news conference claiming the Moon landing was an elaborate hoax.
- "Denmark Introduces Harrowing New Tourism Ads Directed By Lars Von Trier": In February 2010, online newspapers such as Il Corriere della Sera (Italy) and Adresseavisen (Norway) repackaged clips from The Onion video piece as legitimate news.
- "Frustrated Obama Sends Nation Rambling 75,000-Word E-Mail": In November 2010, the Fox Nation website presented The Onion article as a genuine report.
- "Congress Takes Group Of Schoolchildren Hostage": In September 2011, United States Capitol Police investigated a series of tweets coming from The Onion's Twitter account claiming that U.S. congressmen were holding twelve children hostage.
- "Obama Openly Asks Nation Why On Earth He Would Want To Serve For Another Term": On January 7, 2012, Lim Hwee Hua—a former Singaporean MP—posted the article on her Facebook page.
- "Planned Parenthood Opens $8 Billion Abortionplex": On February 3, 2012, U.S. Congressman John Fleming (R-Louisiana) posted a link to the article on his Facebook page.
- "Gallup Poll: Rural Whites Prefer Ahmadinejad to Obama": On September 28, 2012, Iran's Fars News Agency copied The Onion story verbatim on their website. The Onion updated the original story with the note: "For more on this story: Please visit our Iranian subsidiary organization, Fars", linking to a screenshot of Fars's coverage of the story.
- "Kim Jong-Un Named The Onion's Sexiest Man Alive For 2012": On November 27, 2012, the online version of the Chinese Communist Party newspaper The People's Daily ran a story on Kim Jong-un, citing The Onion's article as a source and even included a 55-page photo gallery with the article in tribute to the North Korean leader.
- "Fred Phelps, Man Who Forever Stopped March Of Gay Rights, Dead At 84": In March 2014, Ed Farrell—the Vice Mayor of Maricopa, Arizona—apologized for inadvertently and enthusiastically praising Fred Phelps via a post of the satirical obituary on his Facebook page. In an interview about his Facebook post Farrell apologized for doing it, stating "I had no clue about this guy; he's an idiot. I can't believe that I posted what I posted [...] shame on me."
- "FIFA Frantically Announces 2015 Summer World Cup In United States": In May 2015, the former FIFA vice president Jack Warner—who was arrested on corruption charges that same month—drew attention to The Onion article by reporting it as real news in a video on Facebook.
- "Study: Every 10 Seconds A Skyscraper Window Washer Falls To His Death": In September 2018, Serbian president Aleksandar Vučić made the statement commenting on the death of two workers who died working on the Belgrade Waterfront construction site. He expressed his condolences to the families, but said that "in Serbia, there are proportionally a lot less accidents in dangerous jobs, such as construction. As for the allegations aimed against the state, I want to tell the citizens—even though I did not want to speak about it—that I read some data. Did you know that, in America, every ten seconds one window washer dies doing his job?".
- "CIA Issues Posthumous Apology After New Evidence Clears Osama Bin Laden Of Involvement In 9/11 Attacks": On October 13, 2019, former Inspector-General of the Royal Malaysian Police Musa Hassan received criticism after promoting the titled post as real news on Twitter, and then doubling down when other Twitter users pointed out the satirical nature of the site, remarking "Wait for The Onion to deny it. If not, it means that America allows the spreading of fake news."

=== Prescient articles ===
The Onion has predicted real-life incidents on more than one occasion.

In February 2004, The Onion published "Fuck Everything, We're Doing Five Blades", framed as an editorial from the CEO of Gillette stating their razors would start including five blades, mocking the competition between Gillette and Schick. Gillette subsequently introduced a five-blade razor in September 2005.

Other examples include the 2013 article "Overstock.com Announces Plans To Develop Original Content," which predicted a real 2015 news story, and the 2002 article "RIAA Sues Radio Stations For Giving Away Free Music," which predicted a real 2008 news story.

=== As a political actor ===
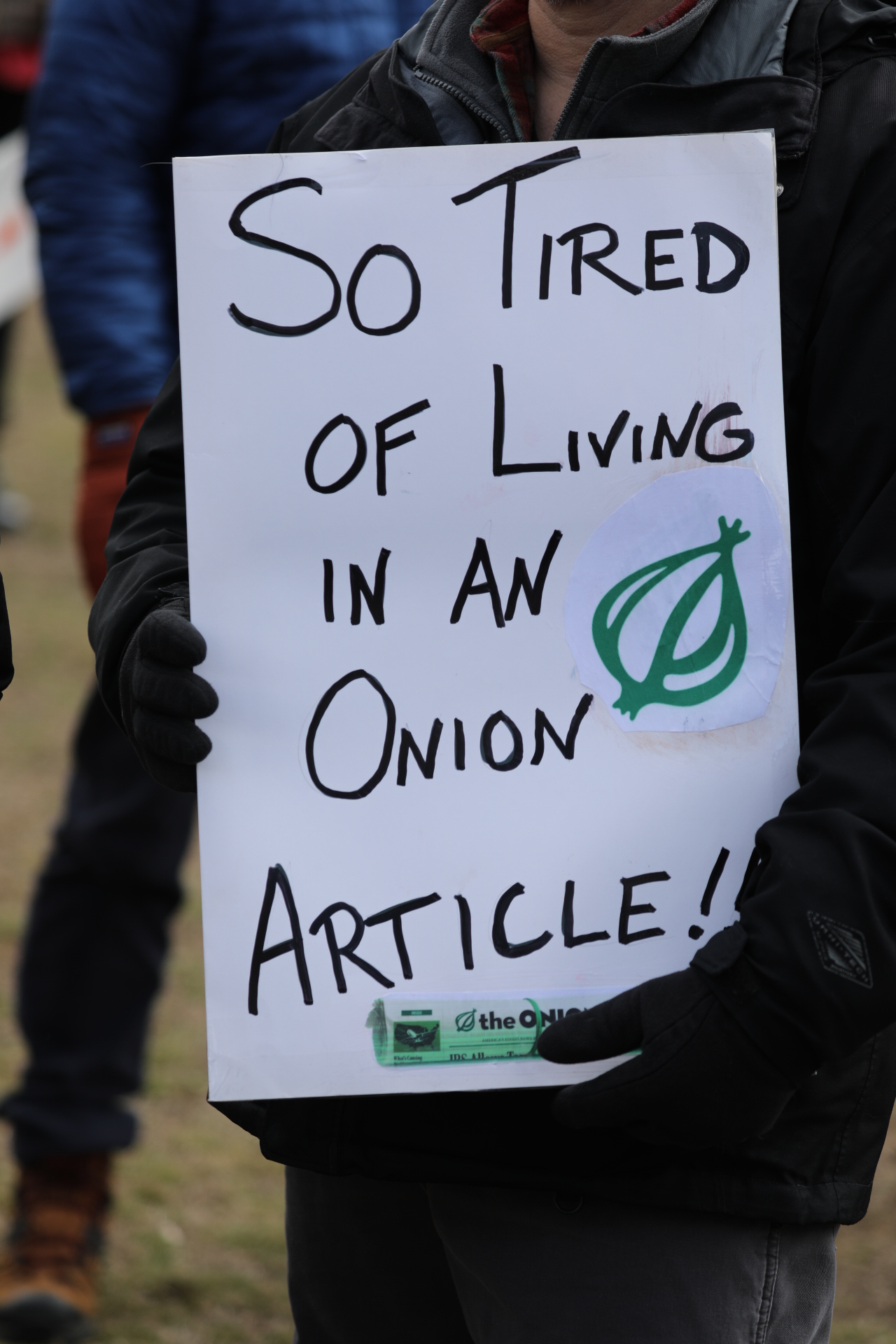
A protester at No Kings 3 referencing The Onion

Several commentators have characterized The Onion as overtly political. In 2013, Noreen Malone, editor of The New York Times Sunday Business section, characterized the publication as producing biting, leftist op-ed pieces through its presentation of satire news. Conversely, journalist David Weigel criticized the outlet for advocating US intervention in the Syrian civil war and same-sex marriage in the United States, which he framed as already popular views adopted for the faster Internet news cycle. Farhad Manjoo of Slate similarly attributed the publication's "faster, bigger, more strident, and, to me, a little inconsistent" tone to the exigencies of the Internet.

Political commentator Emmett Rensin has described The Onion as "the paper most dedicated to the overthrowing capitalism in the United States" and that it "represents some latent Marxism in our culture", citing its criticism of false consciousness, commodity fetishization, and the invisible hand. Rensin attributes this slant to the need to work from "obvious, intuitive truth—the kind necessary for any kind of broadly appealing humor", while Christine Wenc's book Funny Because It's True highlights that many early writers came from The Daily Cardinal, the left-leaning student newspaper of the University of Wisconsin–Madison.

Some of the publication's political impact is unintentional. For example, The Onion's long-running caricature of Joe Biden as a blue-collar "creepy but harmless uncle" character is believed to have benefited the real Joe Biden's public image. In May 2019, the former Onion editor Joe Garden published an op-ed in Vice to express regret over the character, which he felt had distracted from serious concerns about Biden's political record and personal behavior.

=== U.S. Presidential Seal dispute ===
The U.S. Presidential Seal

In September 2005, the assistant counsel to President George W. Bush, Grant M. Dixton, wrote a cease-and-desist letter to The Onion, asking the publication to stop using the presidential seal, which it used in an online parody of Bush.

The Onion responded with a formal request to use the seal in accordance with the executive order, while maintaining that its use was legitimate. The letter stated, "It is inconceivable that anyone would think that, by using the seal, The Onion intends to 'convey ... sponsorship or approval' by the president", but then went on to ask that the letter be considered a formal application requesting permission to use the seal.

=== 85th Academy Awards controversy ===
During the 85th Academy Awards, a post on The Onion's Twitter account called 9-year-old Best Actress nominee Quvenzhané Wallis "a cunt". The post was deleted within an hour, but not before hundreds of angry responses. CEO Steve Hannah issued an apology to Wallis and the Academy of Motion Picture Arts and Sciences, calling the remarks "crude and offensive" and "No person should be subjected to such a senseless, humorless comment masquerading as satire." Scott Dikkers—who was Vice President Creative Development for the publication at the time—said in an interview with NBC 5 Chicago that the publication had sent an apology note to Quvenzhané and her family but also stated, "She's a big star now. I think she can take it." The publication's public apology was denounced by some former Onion writers, with one stating, "It wasn't a great joke, but big deal."

=== Subway September 11 promotion ===
In 2013, The Onion published an article detailing the introduction of a recent promotion at Subway themed around the September 11 attacks, where customers could supposedly get two footlong subs for $9.11. This article was accompanied by an ad that depicted a man flying towards two sub sandwiches (arranged to depict the twin towers) along with further offensive jokes around the attacks. The ad quickly circulated around the internet and gathered much criticism as it led customers to believe it was official.

Subway responded on Twitter with a statement reading: "Like everyone, we are deeply offended by the fake story and ad created by The Onion." However, the hoax again came under some scrutiny when YouTuber Travis Northrup posted a video where he printed out the ad and presented it as a coupon when ordering at his local Subway in San Francisco. To his surprise, the coupon was accepted. This video caused some backlash due to some believing that Subway was honoring the hoax, but many still saw it as a humorous situation.

=== Amicus brief in Novak v. City of Parma ===
On October 3, 2022, The Onion filed its first amicus curiae brief with the Supreme Court of the United States in the case of Novak v. City of Parma. The Onion supported the certiorari petition of Anthony Novak, who was seeking civil damages after having been arrested and unsuccessfully prosecuted over a Facebook page parodying the page of the Parma Police Department. The Onion's brief contained numerous jokes, including a claimed readership of 4.3 trillion, a remark that "the federal judiciary is staffed entirely by total Latin dorks", and a boast regarding Jonathan Swift that "its writers are far more talented, and their output will be read long after that hack Swift's has been lost to the sands of time". The brief noted the paper's Latin motto as Tu stultus es ("You are stupid").

== See also ==
- List of satirical magazines
- List of satirical news websites
- List of satirical television news programs

== Works cited ==
- Wenc, Christine (2025). Funny Because It's True: How The Onion Created Modern American News Satire. Running Press. ISBN 9780762484430.
