= Maria Schneider (cartoonist) =

American humorist

Maria Schneider (born August 18, 1968) is an American humorist, cartoonist and illustrator best known for her work with the satirical online newspaper The Onion and her comic strip Pathetic Geek Stories.

Born and raised in Madison, Wisconsin, Schneider was the comics editor of The Daily Cardinal and an early contributor to The Onion as an undergrad. Schneider moved to New York City with the staff of The Onion in 2001. Her contributions include writing humor columns as a variety of characters: T. Herman Zweibel, Jean Teasdale and Herbert Kornfeld.

Schneider's comic strip, Pathetic Geek Stories, illustrates tales of pain and humiliation, usually during adolescence, sent to her by readers. In 2004, Pathetic Geek Stories formally ceased to be a feature in The Onion, moving to its own website. The site has not been updated since November 2008.

== Books ==
In 2010, The Onion Presents A Book of Jean's Own!, a book-length collection of new material written by Schneider as Jean Teasdale, was published by St. Martin's Griffin. The book's front cover was illustrated by Mort Drucker. Publishers Weekly gave it a mixed review.
