= Jeff Lawson (footballer) =

Australian rules footballer

Personal information
- Full name: Jeff Lawson
- Born: 14 October 1944
- Original team: Box Hill Pioneers
- Height: 170 cm (5 ft 7 in)
- Weight: 73 kg (161 lb)
- Position: Rover

Playing career^{1}
Years	Club	Games (Goals)
1963–64	Richmond	10 (7)
- ^{1} Playing statistics correct to the end of 1964.

Jeff Lawson (born 14 October 1944) is a former Australian rules footballer who played with Richmond in the Victorian Football League (VFL).
