= Trump: Surviving at the Top =

1990 book by Donald Trump and Charles Leerhsen

- Authors: Donald Trump; Charles Leerhsen
- Language: English
- Subject: Business
- Publisher: Random House
- Publication date: August 14, 1990
- Publication place: United States
- Media type: Print (hardcover and paperback)
- Pages: 236
- ISBN: 978-0-394-57597-1
- Preceded by: Trump: The Art of the Deal (1987)
- Followed by: Trump: The Art of the Comeback (1997)

Trump: Surviving at the Top is a 1990 book credited to businessman Donald Trump and journalist Charles Leerhsen, and published by Random House. A sequel to Trump: The Art of the Deal, it combines accounts of Trump's business ventures with material about his personal life as his finances and marriage were coming under increasing strain. The book spent seven weeks on The New York Times Best Seller list, including two weeks at number one. In 1991, Warner Books purchased the paperback rights and re-released the book as Trump: The Art of Survival.

The image used for the book's cover was originally taken by photographer Michael O'Brien for a Fortune magazine article published in September 1989. A print of the photograph was later displayed at the National Portrait Gallery prior to Trump's 2017 first presidential inauguration.

In 2019, Leerhsen stated that he was in fact the book's ghostwriter, writing Trump: Surviving at the Top from late 1988 to 1990. CBS News subsequently described Leerhsen as the ghostwriter behind the book and reported that he had worked with Trump during the two years leading up to its publication.

== Synopsis ==
The book serves as a continuation and response to Trump: The Art of the Deal. In the introduction to the book, Trump wrote, "Looking back on it, I see that writing The Art of the Deal was one of the most satisfying and fulfilling experiences of my life." The book discusses Trump's purchases of the Plaza Hotel, the Eastern Air Lines Shuttle, his Atlantic City casino interests including the Trump Taj Mahal, and other properties acquired during his late-1980s expansion. Trump also commented on the heavy debt that accompanied those acquisitions and the negotiations with his lenders as his finances deteriorated. Contemporary and later reporting placed this material in the context of Trump's near-insolvency: by April 1990, Trump and businesses he controlled had accumulated about $3.4 billion in debt, of which he had personally guaranteed approximately $900 million. The book also addresses the troubled relationship between Trump and his then-wife Ivana Trump, while Trump maintained that his relationship with Marla Maples was "not the cause of the trouble between Ivana and me".

== Writing and publication ==
Trump wrote the book with Charles Leerhsen, who was a senior writer for Newsweek at the time. Trump had considered naming the book Everybody Hates a Winner, stating that he sensed "a lot of jealousy and hostility from many people I do business with or see socially." As the book was being written, Trump was unsure whether he would include details regarding his troubled marriage to Ivana Trump. Leerhsen later said that his work on the book began in late 1988 and continued through 1990.

Peter Osnos, the book's editor, said in June 1990 that the manuscript was being updated repeatedly as Trump's circumstances changed. Editing was completed on July 16, 1990. The book had initially been scheduled for release in October 1990, but Random House moved publication to August amid intense coverage of Trump's financial problems and his separation from Ivana. Random House had reportedly paid Trump an advance of more than $2 million and, following the success of The Art of the Deal, prepared and distributed approximately 500,000 copies of Surviving at the Top. After the book's release, Trump called it "a transitional book" and said his next book would describe his comeback and future success.

Warner Books paid Random House nearly $1 million for the paperback rights. Warner released the paperback in 1991 under the new title Trump: The Art of Survival. Laurence Kirshbaum, then president of Warner Books, said the new title was considered "a more apt representation of what has happened in Trump's career recently." A new introduction was written by Trump for the paperback version. Publishers Weekly described the paperback as an updated autobiographical sequel covering, among other subjects, the Taj Mahal casino and Trump's separation from Ivana.

In May 2019, Leerhsen described the period in which he ghostwrote Surviving at the Top as Trump's "King Midas" period, referring to the number of major acquisitions Trump was making; he joked that he never used the expression to Trump because Trump might have taken "Midas" as a reference to the muffler company. Leerhsen later criticized the image of business success presented by Surviving at the Top and The Art of the Deal, saying that Trump's mounting losses during the late 1980s did not appear to preoccupy him and arguing that lenders continued to support Trump despite his weakening finances. Tax information later obtained by The New York Times showed that Trump reported more than $1 billion in business losses from 1985 through 1994 and appeared to have lost more money than nearly any other individual American taxpayer in the comparison data available to the newspaper. During the period discussed by Leerhsen, Trump's holdings included three Atlantic City hotel-casinos, the Plaza Hotel, the Eastern Air Lines Shuttle and a roughly 282-foot yacht, while lenders continued extending credit and later negotiated a broad restructuring of his debts.

== Cover art ==
The cover photograph was taken by photographer Michael O'Brien for the September 11, 1989 issue of the business magazine Fortune, which had assigned him to photograph Trump for a story about billionaires. O'Brien conceived the cloud-filled background as an allusion to the paintings of René Magritte and bought the red apple used in the portrait from a fruit stand in Brooklyn. O'Brien later recalled being disappointed that Fortune reproduced the image at a small size; about a year later, a Random House editor saw the photograph and selected it for the cover of Surviving at the Top.

Between 2009 and 2011, the National Portrait Gallery accepted a group of O'Brien portraits as gifts from Bill and Sally Wittliff; the Trump image was among them, and the Gallery's print was made in 2011. The print was displayed from January 13 to February 26, 2017, encompassing Trump's first presidential inauguration.

== Reception ==
John Rothchild, writing for the Los Angeles Times, noted the different writing styles between Trump's first two books following the change in ghostwriter and commented that Surviving at the Top contained more photographs of Trump with celebrities than of his buildings. Meanwhile, Gary Belis of Fortune wrote that Trump "taking the blame for mistakes is just not his style." Michael Lewis, writing for The New York Times, criticized Surviving at the Top, calling it "a portrait of an ego gone haywire". Time critic Margaret Carlson described the sequel as appearing amid Trump's financial and marital problems and criticized it for relying on anecdotes while leaving important questions unanswered. In The Washington Post, Howard Kurtz wrote that the book's first half had been hastily reworked to account for Trump's mounting setbacks and questioned how closely its voice resembled Trump's own.

The book spent seven weeks on the New York Times Best Seller list, including two weeks at the number one spot. Trump's previous book, The Art of the Deal, had spent 48 weeks on the list. In October 1990, Trump stated that Random House expected to sell between 200,000 and 250,000 copies of the book, out of nearly 500,000 copies published and distributed. At that point, The New York Times estimated that about 80,000 copies had been sold, according to an Associated Press report, while Random House chief executive Alberto Vitale said that from a financial standpoint the book had not been a disaster.

In January 2017, Michael Kranish of The Washington Post contrasted Trump's advice in Surviving at the Top with his later book Think Like a Billionaire, commenting that "to read Trump's books is to find a man of contradiction." In 2019, former Random House editor Peter Osnos recalled that Surviving at the Top was published as Trump's financial and personal troubles intensified and was less successful than The Art of the Deal. Literary scholar Nicholas K. Mohlmann devoted a chapter of his 2021 book Trump and Autobiography: Corporate Culture, Political Rhetoric, and Interpretation to Surviving at the Top, placing it within the history of popular corporate autobiography and management writing.
