= The Art of the Deal =

1987 book by Donald Trump and Tony Schwartz

Trump: The Art of the Deal
- Author: Donald J. Trump; Tony Schwartz
- Language: English
- Subject: Business
- Publisher: Random House
- Publication date: November 12, 1987
- Publication place: United States
- Media type: Print (hardcover and paperback)
- Pages: 256
- ISBN: 0-394-55528-7
- Dewey Decimal: 333.330924
- LC Class: HC102.5.T78 A3
- Followed by: Trump: Surviving at the Top (1990)

Trump: The Art of the Deal is a 1987 book ghostwritten by journalist Tony Schwartz with businessman Donald J. Trump. Part memoir and part business-advice book, it was the first book credited to Trump, and it helped to make him a household name. It reached number 1 on The New York Times Best Seller list, stayed there for 13 weeks, and altogether held a position on the list for 48 weeks.

Trump has cited it as one of his proudest accomplishments and his second-favorite book (after the Bible). Schwartz called ghost-writing the book his "greatest regret in life, without question," and both he and the book's publisher, Howard Kaminsky, have said that Trump had played no role in its writing. Trump has given conflicting accounts on the question of authorship.

== Synopsis ==
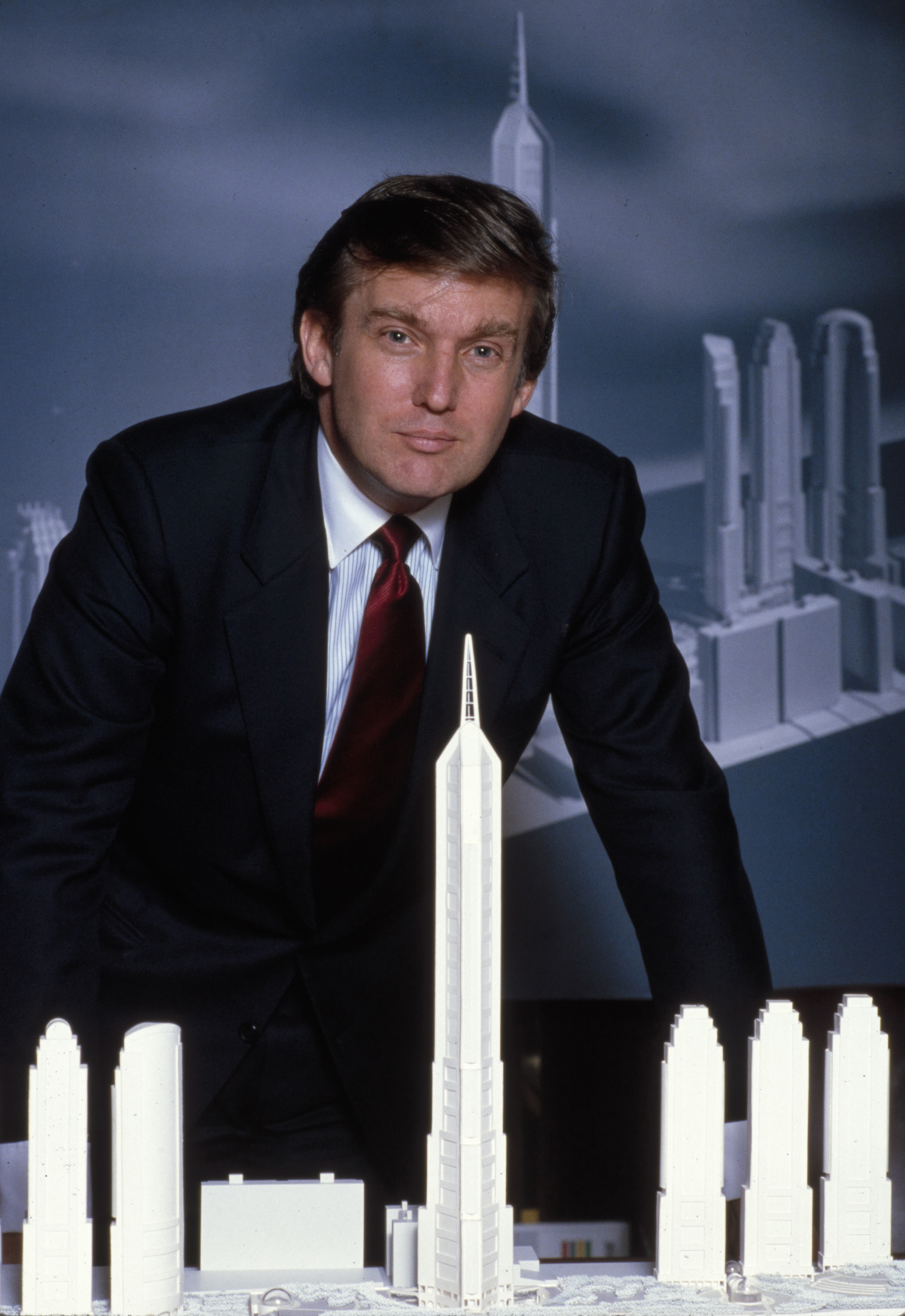
Trump in 1985

The book talks about Trump's early childhood in Jamaica Estates, Queens. It describes his early work in Brooklyn prior to moving to Manhattan and building the Trump Organization, his actions and thoughts in developing the Grand Hyatt Hotel and Trump Tower, in renovating Wollman Rink, and regarding various other projects. Its opening chapter, "Dealing: A Week in the Life", follows a week of Trump's calls and meetings; the next, "Trump Cards: The Elements of the Deal", sets out eleven principles that recur through the project-based chapters that follow. Trump talks about business strategies and tactics he uses in 'dealmaking', often giving one-liners suggesting simple philosophies to follow in business. The book also contains an 11-step formula for business success, inspired by Norman Vincent Peale's The Power of Positive Thinking.

== Development ==
Trump was persuaded to produce the book by Condé Nast owner Si Newhouse after the May 1984 issue of his magazine GQ—with Trump appearing on the cover—sold well. Journalist Tony Schwartz was recruited directly by Trump after he read Schwartz's extremely negative 1985 New York article, "A Different Kind of Donald Trump Story", about Trump's unsuccessful efforts to evict rent-controlled and rent-stabilized tenants from a building he had bought on Central Park South in 1982 and tactics Schwartz portrayed as coercive. To Schwartz's amazement, Trump loved the article and even had the cover, which had an unflattering portrait of him, autographed by Schwartz and hung in his office. Schwartz was hired to write the book for $250,000 upfront; Trump assigned him half of the royalties. Schwartz later said that his motivation was financial and that he needed the money to support his new family.

According to Schwartz in July 2016, Trump did not write any of the book, choosing only to remove a few critical mentions of business colleagues at the end of the process. Trump responded with conflicting stories, saying "I had a lot of choice of who to have write the book, and I chose Schwartz", but then said "Schwartz didn't write the book. I wrote the book." Former Random House head Howard Kaminsky, the original publisher, said "Trump didn't write a postcard for us!" The book was published with the authorship given as "Donald Trump with Tony Schwartz". In 2019, Schwartz suggested that the work be "recategorized as fiction".

To inform the content and style, Schwartz drew on the already-substantial archive of news, profiles and books about Trump as well as interviews with Trump associates. When interviews with Trump himself proved unproductive, the two struck on an unusual alternative: Schwartz listened in on Trump's office phone calls for several months to witness him in action. The experience was condensed into chapter one, "Dealing: A Week in the Life", which introduces the reader to numerous prominent figures and events. The chapter was excerpted in New York Magazine to promote the book and served as a blueprint for future autobiographies.

Schwartz was the subject of a July 2016 article in The New Yorker in which he describes Trump unfavorably and relates how he came to regret writing The Art of the Deal. He also stated that if it were to be written today it would be very different and titled The Sociopath. Schwartz repeated his self-criticism on Good Morning America, saying he had "put lipstick on a pig". In response, Trump's attorneys demanded that Schwartz cede his royalties to Trump.

The cover photo was taken by photographer Michele Singer, who would later become film director and actor Rob Reiner's second wife.

== Publication and promotion ==
The Art of the Deal was published in November 1987 by Random House. A promotional campaign was undertaken in conjunction with its release. This included Trump holding a release party at Trump Tower, hosted by Jackie Mason, featuring a celebrity-filled guest list. Trump made a series of appearances on television talk shows and was pictured on a number of magazine covers. Contemporary coverage in the Los Angeles Times reported that the book sold 54,000 copies in one week during the promotion.

Two months before publication, in a bid to promote the book, Trump waded into national politics. On September 2, 1987, working with his publicist, Dan Klores, and long-running political interlocutor, Roger Stone, Trump ran full-page ads in major newspapers criticizing Washington for the cost of defending U.S. allies. On October 22, he spoke to a New Hampshire crowd under the aegis of a "Draft Trump" movement. Of the speech, Trump said in early 2016, "I wasn't even thinking about [running for president] ... It was a lot to do with my book." Klores said, "He didn't run but it was probably the greatest book promotion of all time." Excerpts were published in New York Magazine. The book has been translated into over a dozen languages.

== Royalties ==
Trump and Schwartz had an agreement to split royalties from the sale of the book on a 50–50 basis. In 1987, Trump set up the Donald J. Trump Foundation in connection with his stated plan to give away the royalties, promising four or five million dollars "to the homeless, to Vietnam veterans, for AIDS, multiple sclerosis". A Washington Post investigation found that Trump gave $1.9 million of his own money through the foundation from 1987 through 1991, but $143,700 went to the four categories highlighted in the book's promotion: $101,000 to veterans, $26,000 to the homeless, $12,450 to AIDS charities and $4,250 to multiple-sclerosis research. The paper contrasted those amounts with, among other recipients, $16,750 given to the School of American Ballet, which Ivanka Trump attended. The Washington Post asked Trump's 2016 presidential campaign if he had donated the $55,000 of royalties he had earned from the book in the first six months of 2016 to charity, as he promised in the 1980s, and it did not respond.

By 2016, Schwartz said he had received some $1.6 million in royalty payments. Schwartz said he would be donating six months of royalties (worth $55,000) to the National Immigration Law Center, which assists low-income immigrants and advocates for policies allowing more undocumented immigrants to remain in the United States legally. Schwartz had earlier donated royalties he received in the second half of 2015, worth $25,000, to a number of charities including the National Immigration Forum. Schwartz said he wanted to help the people Trump was attacking.

Trump's 2018 financial disclosure reported royalties from The Art of the Deal in the $100,001 to $1 million range, while most of his other books reported little or no royalty income. Trump's disclosure covering 2019 again reported royalties in the $100,001 to $1 million range. His 2025 annual disclosure reported $50,001 to $100,000 in royalties from the book.

== Book sales ==
Precise figures of the number of copies sold of The Art of the Deal are unavailable because its publication preceded the Nielsen BookScan era. Accounts differ on the size of the initial printing. Publishers Weekly listed 135,000 copies before publication, while Random House editor Peter Osnos later recalled a first printing of about 125,000; the figure has also been reported as 150,000 copies. Several magazine and book accounts state that it sold over one million hardcover copies or one million copies. A 2016 CBS News investigation reported that an unnamed source familiar with the book's sales placed the figure at 1.1 million copies sold.

Trump said in his 2016 presidential campaign that The Art of the Deal is "the No. 1 selling business book of all time". An analysis by PolitiFact found that other business books had sold many more copies than The Art of the Deal. While it is impossible to find exact sales figures, a range of possibilities based on known claims and facts were given. When compared to six other famous business books, The Art of the Deal ranked in fifth place according to the analysis; the top-selling book, How to Win Friends and Influence People, outsold it by a factor of 15 times.

== Reception and legacy ==
At the time of publication, Publishers Weekly called it a "boastful, boyishly disarming, thoroughly engaging personal history". People magazine gave it a mixed review.

John Kenneth Galbraith's 1988 book review in The New York Review of Books said that the book reveals very little about the planning and construction of Trump's projects and hardly mentions the construction companies he had hired to do the work. Instead, the book emphasizes "the deals, including the deals that depend on winning the acquiescence of New York City or New Jersey authorities—righteous, well-intentioned, or mostly, it here seems, otherwise". It also presents "failures, misjudgments, and disasters", such as the unsuccessful venture at 100 Central Park South as an "exercise of great entrepreneurial skill and acceptable public behavior", and the demise of the New Jersey Generals and the USFL, as a success.

Fortune's 1988 book review called Trump "master of hype in the communications capital of the world" and said that the book would "not be of much use in business schools or to anyone with a real job. What it delivers is everything you always suspected about the makeup of Donald Trump: the pomposity, the shallowness, and above all, the need for more money, more toys, and more attention". The review also noted that Trump was the 27th-largest developer in the U.S. and "not even the biggest in New York", having "built only three buildings in Manhattan".

In 1991, journalist John Tierney noted Trump "appears to have ignored some of his own advice" in the book due to "well-publicized problems with his banks". Trump's self-promotion, best-selling book and media celebrity status led one commentator in 2006 to call him "a poster-child for the 'greed is good' 1980s". (The phrase "Greed is good" is from the movie Wall Street, which was released a month after The Art of the Deal.) Jim Geraghty in the National Review said in 2015 that the book showed "a much softer, warmer, and probably happier figure than the man dominating the airwaves today". John Paul Rollert, an ethicist writing about the book in The Atlantic in 2016, says Trump sees capitalism not as an economic system but a morality play. The book has also been examined in academic literature. Economist Kevin W. Capehart used it in a 2015 article on Hyman Minsky's analysis of Trump's financing, while a 2019 issue of Negotiation Journal included analyses of Trump's negotiation strategy that treated the book as a primary source. A 2026 article in the Quarterly Journal of Speech analyzed the book's construction of wealth, ethos and dealmaking rhetoric.

The book coined the phrase "truthful hyperbole" describing "an innocent form of exaggeration—and... a very effective form of promotion". Schwartz said Trump loved the phrase and later said that he had coined it while writing the book. In January 2017, the phrase was noted for its similarity to the phrase "alternative facts" coined by Counselor to the President Kellyanne Conway when she defended White House Press Secretary Sean Spicer's widely derided statements about the attendance at Trump's inauguration as President of the United States.

Schwartz described Trump's lying:

'Lying is second nature to him,' Schwartz said. 'More than anyone else I have ever met, Trump has the ability to convince himself that whatever he is saying at any given moment is true, or sort of true, or at least ought to be true.'

In 2021, Yuri Shvets, a former KGB major, alleged that Trump had been cultivated as a potential Russian asset over a period of decades, beginning around 1980. In The Art of the Deal, Trump discusses business opportunities arising from improving relations between the United States and the Soviet Union, including the possibility of building "a large luxury hotel across the street from the Kremlin in partnership with the Soviet government." Shvets told The Guardian that Soviet operatives had encouraged Trump's political ambitions during his 1987 visit and that officials in Moscow were pleased when he later placed newspaper advertisements expressing foreign-policy positions that Shvets characterized as useful Soviet talking points. Shvets was a source for journalist Craig Unger's 2021 book American Kompromat; people named in the account disputed parts of the allegation, including businessman Semyon Kislin, who denied any relationship with the KGB.

=== Questions of veracity ===
Biographers, associates and fact-checkers have cast doubt on parts of the book's version of events. Their accounts describe projects that the book presents largely through Trump as also depending on public officials, lawyers, financiers and other specialists, while some reported timelines and profits differ from those in the book. Critics of the book's accuracy have therefore described its central dealmaker as a composite that minimizes the roles of other participants and presents setbacks in more favorable terms. As biographer Gwenda Blair wrote in 2000, "In The Art of the Deal, [Trump] claims that business deals are what distinguish him ... but his most original creation is the continuous self-inflation." Still, those tracing out Trump's life could not discern the more limited reality all at once. Speaking 20 years later, Blair bemoaned her failure, as a biographer, to have "understood how fabricated [the book] was ... how that founding myth was so riddled with at best exaggeration."

Chapter four, "The Cincinnati Kid", tells the story of Trump's "first big deal". According to the book, Trump came up with the idea of buying Swifton Village, a struggling apartment complex in Cincinnati. He partnered with his father Fred to turn Swifton around; then, just as the neighborhood headed irretrievably downhill, tricked a buyer into overpaying: "The price was $12 million—or approximately a $6 million profit for us. It was a huge return on a short-term investment." Roy Knight, part of the Village's maintenance crew, told reporters that the project was actually Fred Trump's "baby"; biographers generally agree. Donald was cloistered at New York Military Academy when his father boarded a plane to Ohio and won the property at auction. He attended college while Fred turned things around. The younger Trump did visit on occasion, but only to do "yard work and cleaning". Finally, the sale price was $6.75 million, $1 million more than the purchase price, representing little if any profit after eight years of expenses (estimated at $500,000) and interest.

Chapter six, "Grand Hyatt", tells the story of Trump's true first big deal. Without it, the book opined, "I'd probably be back in Brooklyn today, collecting rents." In his 1992 biography of Trump, journalist Wayne Barrett, who had covered the project in detail, took issue with many of the book's claims. In particular, he noted the absence of nearly all the key players—from New York governor Hugh Carey, a longtime Trump family associate, to city planners betting their careers on the novel private-public partnership, to Louise Sunshine, Carey's former chief fundraiser. "In The Art of the Deal," Barrett wrote, "it was as if Donald walked out onstage alone." Sunshine later recalled that the project also involved Fred Trump, the Pritzker family, New York City and a 40-year tax abatement requiring extensive city approvals.

Chapter seven, "Trump Tower," opens with a fully hatched plan. "In order to put up the building I had in mind, I was going to have to assemble several ... adjacent pieces—and then seek numerous zoning variances." George Ross, one of Trump's lawyers on the project and later his lieutenant on The Apprentice, seasons 1–5, recalled the process differently. Where Trump depicted himself expertly poring over his "air-rights contract" and "discover[ing] an unexpected bonus," Ross wrote: "I enlightened Donald about the zoning laws that permitted one owner to sell and transfer unused building rights (commonly called air rights)." One key step involved the adjacent Tiffany's store. "Unfortunately, I didn't know anyone at Tiffany," Trump wrote, "and the owner, Walter Hoving, was known not only as a legendary retailer but also as a difficult, demanding, mercurial guy." Trump claimed that he cold-called Hoving and tricked him into a one-sided deal. Per Ross, however, the transaction was aboveboard and owed entirely to Fred Trump's business connections: "Donald's father and Walter Hoving had done some business together and Donald's father suggested to Donald that he could work out a fair deal with Hoving in a short period of time."

Based on Trump's tax returns between 1985 and 1994 which showed a loss greater than "nearly any other individual American taxpayer" during that period, co-author Schwartz suggested that the book might be "recategorized as fiction".

Discussing the book's legacy during Trump's second presidency, Bloomberg senior executive editor Tim O'Brien told MSNOW that The Art of the Deal is "a non-fiction work of fiction about [Trump]'s history as a dealmaker which was littered with mistakes."

=== Film and television ===
In 1988, Trump and Ted Turner announced plans for a television film based on the book. The plans had been largely abandoned by 1991. Mark Burnett, creator of The Apprentice, credited the book for inspiring "his leap from selling T-shirts off racks on Venice Boulevard in Los Angeles to producing television shows," and later, after success with Survivor, the idea of a show starring Trump himself. Trump's monologue opened the long-running show: "I've mastered the art of the deal ... And as the master I want to pass my knowledge along to somebody else. I'm looking for... The Apprentice." Aspects of the book were used as the basis for the 2016 parody film Donald Trump's The Art of the Deal: The Movie.

== See also ==
- Bibliography of Donald Trump
- List of autobiographies by presidents of the United States
