= Scott Dikkers =

American comic writer

- Born: March 1, 1965 (age 61); Minneapolis, Minnesota
- Education: University of Wisconsin–Madison
- Occupations: Comedy writer, cartoonist
- Years active: 1990s-present
- Known for: The Onion, Jim's Journal

Scott Dikkers (born March 1, 1965) is an American comedy writer and entrepreneur. As a former co-owner of The Onion, he was the publication's longest-serving editor-in-chief, holding the position from 1988–1999 and again from 2005–2008. He also served as the satire newspaper's General Manager and Vice President of Creative Development from 2012–2014.

== Early life ==
Scott Dikkers was born in 1965 in Minneapolis, Minnesota. He grew up in an impoverished household with his two brothers and divorced mother. When she remarried, they moved to Ellsworth, Wisconsin, where he experienced physical abuse from his stepfather. Viewing comedy as his escape, Dikkers initially pursued filmmaking at the University of Southern California but dropped out to instead pursue cartooning.

== Career ==
Dikkers created the comic strip Jim's Journal, which was syndicated to college newspapers from 1987–1997. The comic strip was seen as a reflection of ambitionless Millennials with Jim passively reporting his daily life. In 1988, Dikkers agreed to draw a variety of cartoons for early issues of The Onion, a satirical newspaper. The following year, Onion co-founders Tim Keck and Christopher Johnson sold the paper to Dikkers; Peter Haise, their advertising manager; and Jonnie Wilder, their typesetter, for $16,000. From 1988–1999, Dikkers served as its editor-in-chief. In April 2000, a $12 million deal for Comedy Central to acquire The Onion fell through amid the dot-com crash. In frustration, Dikkers sold his shares to David Schafer, who managed investments for Strong Capital Management.

When Carol Kolb resigned as The Onion's editor-in-chief in 2005, CEO Steve Hannah rehired Dikkers, who stayed in the position until handing it off to Joe Randazzo in 2008. When Hannah announced that The Onion would move from New York City to Chicago in 2011, staff threatened a mass resignation. In response, Hannah convinced Dikkers to return as General Manager and Vice President of Creative Development to maintain the appearance of continuity. After his work producing Onion Live as a collaboration with The Second City improv troupe was poorly received by critics, Dikkers was forced into resigning in 2014. Throughout his tenure, Dikkers portrayed The Onion's fictional publisher, T. Herman Zweibel.

From 2015 to 2023, Dikkers hosted the How To Write Funny podcast, interviewing comedians and comedy writers. Former staff have countered Dikkers' promotional claims that he created The Onion's style of comedy, noting that he largely delegated management of the newspaper to Rich Dahm from 1990 to 1994. In response, Dikkers admitted that his bipolar disorder led him to self-destructive behavior of leaving for extended periods.

Dikkers also wrote and directed several films, including episodes of "The Onion News Network" web series (2007) and the independent features Spaceman (1997) and Bad Meat (2003), which starred Chevy Chase.

== Books ==
- The Joke at the End of the World (writer) (2020, ISBN 979-8695741476)
- Outrageous Marketing: The Story of The Onion and How To Build a Powerful Brand with No Marketing Budget (writer) (2018, ISBN 978-1729585078)
- Trump's America: The Complete Loser's Guide (editor-in-chief, co-writer) (2016, ISBN 978-1944068097)
- Book compilations of The Onion

- Our Dumb Century: 100 Years of Headlines From America's Finest News Source (editor-in-chief, co-writer) (1999, ISBN 0-609-80461-8)
- "The Onion's Finest News Reporting, Volume One" (co-editor with Robert D. Siegel, co-writer) (2000, ISBN 0-609-80463-4)
- "Dispatches from the Tenth Circle: The Best of The Onion" (co-writer) (2001, ISBN 0-609-80834-6)
- "Homeland Insecurity: The Onion Complete News Archives, Volume 17" (co-editor with Carol Kolb, co-writer) (2006, ISBN 0-307-33984-X)
- Our Dumb World (editor-in-chief, co-writer) (2007, ISBN 0-316-01842-2)

- "45: A Portrait of My Knucklehead Brother Jeb" by George W. Bush (co-written with Peter Hilleren) (2015, ISBN 978-1455592852)
- How To Write Funny (writer) (2014, ISBN 978-1499196122)
- How to Write Funnier (writer) (2019, ISBN 978-1796818222)
- How to Write Funniest (writer) (2020, ISBN 979-8652464264)
- "Destined For Destiny: The Unauthorized Autobiography of George W. Bush" (co-writer with Peter Hilleren) (2006, ISBN 0-7432-9966-3)
- You Are Worthless: Depressing Nuggets of Wisdom Sure to Ruin Your Day (credited to "Dr. Oswald T. Pratt and Dr. Scott Dikkers") (1999, ISBN 0-7407-0025-1)
- Jim's Journal cartoon collections (all strips and books credited to "Jim")

- I Went to College and It Was Okay: A Collection of Jim's Journal Cartoons (1991, ISBN 0-8362-1867-1)
- I Got a Job and It Wasn't That Bad: The Second Collection of Jim's Journal Cartoons (1993, ISBN 0-8362-1709-8)
- I Made Some Brownies and They Were Pretty Good: The Third Jim's Journal Collection (1995, ISBN 0-8362-1776-4)
- I Got Married If You Can Believe That: The Fourth Collection of Jim's Journal Cartoons (1996, ISBN 0-8362-1029-8)
- I Feel Like a Grown-Up Now: The Fifth Jim's Journal Collection (1998, ISBN 0-8362-5184-9)
- The Pretty Good Jim's Journal Treasury: The Definitive Collection of Every Published Cartoon (1999, ISBN 0-7407-0007-3)
- I Finally Graduated from High School: The Sixth Collection of Jim's Journal Cartoons (2014, ISBN 978-1499149500)
- The Pretty Good Jim's Journal Treasury: The Even More Definitive Collection of Every Published Cartoon (2016, ISBN 978-1535199889)

- "Plebes" cartoon collections (all strips and books credited to "L. T. Horton")

- "The Ascent of Plebes" (1990, ISBN 0-9626258-1-7)
- "Plebes: The Cartoon Guide for College Guys" (2001, ISBN 0-7407-1851-7)

- "Kimberly Crotchet, Librarian of Tomorrow (co-writer and artist with James Sturm), 1988, self-published.
- "Commix" (co-writer with James Sturm, Chris Ware, J. Keen, Kathryn Rathke, Jay Rath, J. Keen), 1988, self-published.

== Filmography ==
Film	Year	Note
Spaceman	1997	feature
The Astounding World of the Future	2000	short
E-Day!	2001	short
The KIll	2002	short
Bad Meat	2003	feature
Ape Trouble	2010	short
Bright Lights, Big Steam	2010	short
Tycoon Tyke	2010	short

== Works cited ==
- Wenc, Christine (2025). Funny Because It's True: How The Onion Created Modern American News Satire. Running Press. ISBN 9780762484430.
