= Carol Kolb =

American writer

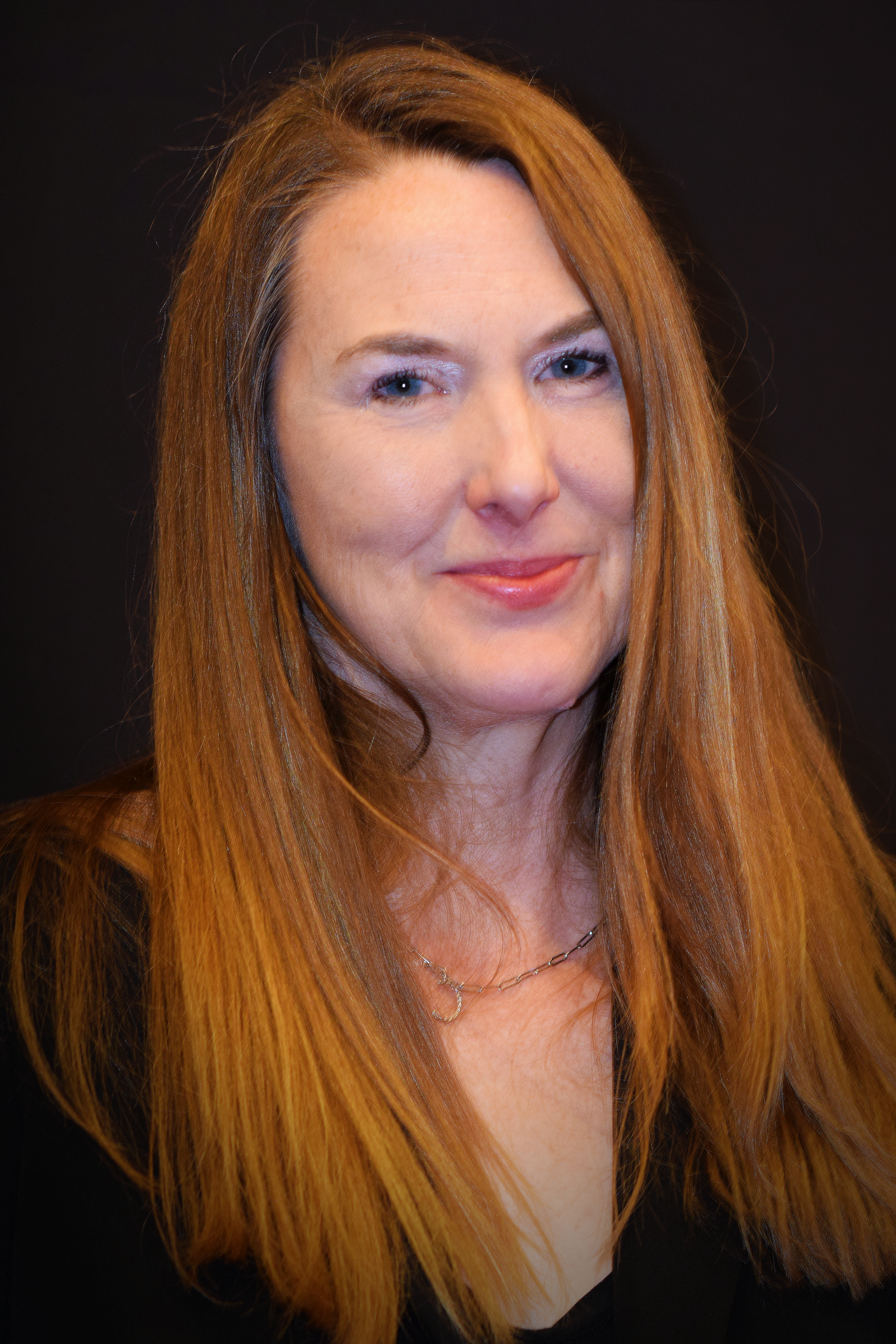
- Kolb in 2023
- Occupations: Writer, producer, editor
- Years active: 2004–present
- Known for: Community; The Onion; Kroll Show; Madison Museum of Bathroom Tissue

Carol Kolb is an American comedy writer. She was a writer for and editor-in-chief of The Onion, and a former head writer for the Onion News Network. She served as a writer on Kroll Show, and later worked as a staff writer on the television series Community, Review, and Brooklyn Nine-Nine.

Kolb was the founder of the now defunct Madison Museum of Bathroom Tissue.
