= Outline of terrorism in the United States =

Overview of and topical guide to terrorism in the United States

The following outline is provided as an overview of and a topical guide to the past and present history of terrorism in the United States:

Although terrorism has been given several different definitions, it is most commonly defined as the use of violence to achieve political goals.

Political terrorism has accounted for the majority of attacks in recent decades (a trend that has accelerated in recent years), while Islamist terrorism has accounted for the majority of deaths.

== Designated foreign terrorist organizations by the United States ==
- Abu Nidal Organization
- Abu Sayyaf Group
- Al-Aqsa Martyrs Brigade
- Al Qaeda
- al-Qaeda in Iraq
- Ansar al-Islam
- Armed Islamic Group
- Asbat al-Ansar
- Aum Shinrikyo
- Caucasus Emirate
- Communist Party of the Philippines
- Continuity Irish Republican Army
- Egyptian Islamic Jihad
- Euskadi ta Askatasuna
- Gama'a al-Islamiyya
- Hamas
- Harakat ul-Mujahidin
- Hezbollah
- Islamic Jihad Union
- Islamic Movement of Uzbekistan
- Izz ad-Din al-Qassam Brigades
- Jaish-e-Mohammed
- Jemaah Islamiya
- Kach and Kahane Chai
- Kurdistan Workers' Party
- Lashkar-e-Taiba
- Lashkar-e-Jhangvi
- Liberation Tigers of Tamil Eelam
- Libyan Islamic Fighting Group
- Moroccan Islamic Combatant Group
- Palestinian Liberation Front
- Palestinian Islamic Jihad
- Popular Front for the Liberation of Palestine
- Popular Front for the Liberation of Palestine – General Command
- Real IRA
- Revolutionary Armed Forces of Colombia
- Revolutionary Nuclei
- Revolutionary Organization 17 November
- Revolutionary People's Liberation Party/Front
- Shining Path
- United Self-Defense Forces of Colombia

== Domestic violent extremist organizations ==
The following are political extremist groups that have used violence:

- Animal Liberation Front
- Army of God (USA)
- Aryan Nations
- Atomwaffen Division
- Earth Liberation Front
- Ku Klux Klan
- Phineas Priesthood
- The Base
- Proud Boys

== Inactive domestic violent extremist organizations ==
The following are violent extremist organizations that have been responsible for terrorist attacks on United States soil. These organizations are no longer active.

- Buffalo Six
- The Covenant, The Sword, and the Arm of the Lord
- Fuerzas Armadas de Liberación Nacional Puertorriqueña
- May 19th Communist Organization
- National States' Rights Party
- Omega-7
- The Order
- Symbionese Liberation Army
- United Freedom Front
- Weather Underground
- FEAR (terrorist group)

== Domestic terrorist attacks ==
The following is a list of terrorist attacks that have happened throughout United States history, which were committed by United States citizens.

- May 21, 1856: Sacking of Lawrence
- May 24, 1856 – May 25, 1856: Pottawatomie massacre
- September 11, 1857: Mountain Meadows massacre
- April 14, 1865: Assassination of Abraham Lincoln
- October 24, 1871: Chinese massacre
- May 4, 1886: Haymarket affair
- November 10, 1898: Wilmington massacre
- September 6, 1901: Assassination of William McKinley
- October 1, 1910: Los Angeles Times bombing
- July 22, 1916: Preparedness Day bombing
- May–July 1917: East St. Louis riots
- May–October 1919: Red Summer
- April–June 1919: U.S. anarchist bombings
- September 16, 1920: Wall Street bombing
- May 31 – June 1, 1921: Tulsa race massacre
- January, 1923: Rosewood massacre
- May 18, 1927: Bath School Disaster
- December 25, 1951: Murder of Harry and Harriette Moore
- October 12, 1958: Bombing of the Hebrew Benevolent Congregation Temple
- September 15, 1963: 16th Street Baptist Church Bombing
- November 22, 1963: Assassination of John F. Kennedy
- June 21, 1964: Murders of Chaney, Goodman, and Schwerner
- February 16, 1970: San Francisco Police Department Park Station bombing
- May 29, 1970: Oakland pipe bombing
- August 24, 1970: Sterling Hall bombing
- November 7, 1983: 1983 U.S. Senate bombing
- April 19, 1995: Oklahoma City bombing
- July 27, 1996: Centennial Olympic Park bombing
- October 13, 2000: Firebombing of Temple Beth El (Syracuse)
- September 18, 2001 – October 9, 2001: Anthrax attacks
- May 2002: Midwest pipe bombings
- October 2002: Beltway Sniper Attacks
- March 3, 2006: Mohammed Reza Taheri-azar SUV attack
- July 28, 2006: Seattle Jewish Federation shooting
- July 27, 2008: Knoxville Unitarian Universalist church shooting
- May 31, 2009: Assassination of George Tiller
- June 1, 2009: Little Rock recruiting office shooting
- June 10, 2009: United States Holocaust Memorial Museum shooting
- November 5, 2009: Fort Hood shooting
- February 18, 2010: Austin suicide attack
- September 1, 2010: Discovery Communications headquarters hostage crisis
- August 5, 2012: Wisconsin Sikh temple shooting
- April 15, 2013: Boston Marathon bombing
- June 8, 2014: Las Vegas shootings
- September 12, 2014: Pennsylvania State Police barracks attack
- October 23, 2014: Queens hatchet attack
- June 17, 2015: Charleston church shooting
- November 27, 2015: Colorado Springs Planned Parenthood shooting
- December 2, 2015: San Bernardino attack
- June 12, 2016: Orlando nightclub shooting
- September 17–19, 2016: New York and New Jersey bombings
- November 28, 2016: Ohio State University attack
- April 18, 2017: Fresno shootings
- May 26, 2017: Portland train attack
- June 14, 2017: Congressional baseball shooting
- August 12, 2017: Charlottesville car attack
- September 24, 2017: Burnette Chapel shooting
- October 31, 2017: New York City truck attack
- August 3, 2019: El Paso shooting
- January 6, 2021: January 6 United States Capitol attack
- January 15, 2022: Colleyville synagogue hostage crisis

== Foreign terrorist attacks ==
The following are terrorist attacks that have occurred throughout United States history, which have been committed by foreign organizations and individuals.

- July 30, 1916: Black Tom explosion
- December 29, 1975: LaGuardia Airport Christmas Bomb
- August 29 – October 10, 1984: 1984 Rajneeshee bioterror attack
- January 25, 1993: CIA Shooting – Mir Qazi
- February 26, 1993: First World Trade Center bombing
- February 23, 1997: Empire State Building shooting
- September 11, 2001: September 11, 2001 attacks
- July 4, 2002: 2002 Los Angeles Airport shooting
- May 3, 2015: Curtis Culwell Center attack
- December 2, 2015: 2015 San Bernardino attack
- June 12, 2016: Orlando nightclub shooting
- September 17, 2016: 2016 St. Cloud, Minnesota knife attack
- October 31, 2017: 2017 New York City truck attack
- December 6, 2019: Naval Air Station Pensacola shooting

== Politically violent individuals ==
The following are individuals that have posed threats to United States security in the past, or have been involved in terrorist attacks.

- Umar Farouk Abdulmutallab
- Jane Alpert
- Dwight Armstrong
- Karleton Armstrong
- Mohamed Atta
- Anwar al-Awlaki
- H. Rap Brown
- James Wenneker von Brunn
- Leo Burt
- Zvonko Bušić
- Zachary Adam Chesser
- Linda Evans
- David Fine
- Hesham Mohamed Hadayet
- Nidal Malik Hasan
- Bruce E. Ivins
- Ted Kaczynski
- Ali Hassan Abu Kamal
- Osama bin Laden
- Colleen LaRose
- James J. Lee
- Timothy McVeigh
- Sam Melville
- George Metesky
- Thomas Mooney
- John Allen Muhammad
- Terry Nichols
- José Padilla
- Aimal Qazi
- Eric Robert Rudolph
- Dawud Salahuddin
- Al-Shabaab
- Faisal Shahzad
- Hosam Maher Husein Smadi
- Mohammed Reza Taheri-azar
- Laura Whitehorn
- Ramzi Yousef

== Worldviews within terrorism ==
The following are common worldviews that have motivated political activists to utilize violence.

- anarchist
- anti-fascist
- black supremacist
- Boogalooism
- Bordigist
- communist
- De Leonist
- Đilasist
- eco-terrorist
- ethnic
- guerrilla
- Guevarist
- Hoxhaist
- Islamic Extremism in the United States
- Islamic fundamentalists
- far left
- far right
- fascist
- Leninist
- Luxemburgist
- Maoist
- Marxist
- militia movement
- militant
- nationalist
- Neo-Confederate
- neo-luddite
- neo-Nazi
- New Left
- Posadist
- paramilitary
- rebel
- religious
- resistance movements
- revolutionary
- separatist
- socialist
- Stalinist
- Titoist
- Trotskyist
- white supremacist
- vigilante

== Methods used in terrorism ==
The following is a list of techniques that have been utilized by politically violent individuals in terrorist attacks.

- agro-terrorism
- arson
- assassination
- bioterrorism
- bombing
- car bombing
- chemical terrorism
- cyberterrorism
- dirty bomb
- dry run
- environmental terrorism
- firebombing
- food poisoning
- genocide
- hijacking
- hostage
- individual terror
- insurgency
- kidnapping
- letter bomb
- paper terrorism
- piracy
- proxy bomb
- shooting
- stabbing
- suicide bombing
- vehicle-ramming attack

== United States counter-terrorism organizations ==
The following is a list of federal organizations in the United States that combat terrorism according to The U.S. Department of State's website.

=== US Department of State ===
- Bureau of Consular Affairs
- Bureau of Diplomatic Security
- Bureau of Democracy, Human Rights, and Labor
- Bureau of Economic, Energy, and Business Affairs
- Bureau of Intelligence and Research
- Bureau of International Narcotics and Law Enforcement Affairs
- Bureau of International Security and Nonproliferation
- Bureau of Political-Military Affairs
- Foreign Service Institute
- Under Secretary for Public Diplomacy and Public Affairs
- United States Mission to the United Nations

=== Department of Defense ===
- Defense Intelligence Agency
- The War on Terror

=== Department of the Treasury ===
- Office of Foreign Assets Control
- Office of Terrorism and Financial Intelligence

=== Department of Justice ===
- Federal Bureau of Investigation
- FBI Most Wanted Terrorists

=== Department of Homeland Security ===
- Coast Guard
- Customs and Border Protection
- Air Forces Northern National Security Emergency Preparedness Directorate
- Immigration and Customs Enforcement
- Transportation Security Administration
- U.S. Secret Service

=== Other agencies ===
- Central Intelligence Agency
- Office of the Director of National Intelligence
- National Counterterrorism Center
- Agency for International Development

The following are other United States counter-terrorism agencies according to various sources.

- Air Force Office of Special Investigations
- Counterintelligence Field Activity
- Defense Criminal Investigative Service
- Diplomatic Security Service
- Naval Criminal Investigative Service
- National Counterterrorism Center (as part of the Office of the Director of National Intelligence)
- Office of the National Counterintelligence Executive
- United States Army Counterintelligence
- United States Army Intelligence and Security Command

== See also ==
- Counter-Terrorism
- Domestic terrorism in the United States
- History of homeland security in the United States
- List of designated terrorist organizations
- List of terrorist incidents
- State Terrorism
- Terrorism
- Terrorism in the United States
- United States and state terrorism
- United States and state-sponsored terrorism
