= David Fine =

David Fine may refer to:

- David G. Fine (1929–2005), British record-label executive
- David Fine (activist) (born 1952), American activist
- David Fine (filmmaker) (born 1960), Canadian filmmaker
