= The War at Home =

The War at Home may refer to:

- The War at Home (1996 film), a motion picture starring Emilio Estevez, Kathy Bates and Martin Sheen
- The War at Home (1979 film), a documentary film about Madison, Wisconsin area resistance to the Vietnam War
- The War at Home (TV series), a primetime TV series on Fox
- "The War at Home" (The West Wing), an episode of the TV series The West Wing
- "The War at Home" (Law & Order: Criminal Intent), a 2006 episode of the TV series Law & Order: Criminal Intent
