= Rod Beaton (sportswriter) =

American sportswriter and journalist (1951–2011)

- Born: Hugh Roderick Beaton Jr. September 28, 1951; Augusta, Georgia, U.S.
- Died: June 22, 2011 (aged 59); Arlington County, Virginia, U.S.
- Education: University of Delaware
- Occupation: Sports journalist
- Years active: 1977–2006
- Employers: The News Journal (1977–1982); USA Today (1982–2006)

Hugh Roderick Beaton Jr. (September 28, 1951 – June 22, 2011) was an American sportswriter and journalist. He covered ice hockey and baseball for The News Journal in the late 1970s, then became one of the original writers for USA Today in 1982. He served as president of the Professional Hockey Writers' Association from 1985 to 1987, when voting for starters in the National Hockey League All-Star Game shifted from the sportswriters to the league's fans.

Beaton focused solely on writing about baseball for USA Today since the late 1980s. He traveled to Minor League Baseball games to watch the younger players and write about, prior to them making it to Major League Baseball. He was credited by The Washington Post for establishing a network to gather information, for writing columns that discussed prospect talent for each major league team, and for giving exposure to many future star players. Sports Illustrated writer Jeff Pearlman described Beaton as a journalist who would not degrade a player just to get attention, and wrote "in a voice that was authoritative and oft-funny".

As a student, Beaton graduated from the University of Delaware, was involved with Students for a Democratic Society, participated in Vietnam War protests, and helped to form a student union in high school. He was diagnosed with Parkinson's disease in 2000, which was later modified to a diagnosis of dementia with Lewy bodies. He retired from journalism in 2006, and died at age 59.

== Early life and education ==
Hugh Roderick Beaton Jr. was born on September 28, 1951, in Augusta, Georgia, and grew up in the greater Wilmington, Delaware area. He graduated from Alexis I. duPont High School in Greenville. He helped to form a student union while in high school. Beaton said about the curriculum, "They don't teach you to teach yourself, which is what education is about". He felt that students who taught themselves how to learn then suffered from low grades and poor recommendations for colleges. According to Beaton, he was suspended from high school for "general insubordination", "organizing a one-day strike", and for "publishing an underground newspaper". He sought for the students' underground New Left newspaper be permitted for sale in the school, and sought for students to have more say into discipline and felt that some students and particularly African Americans were unfairly suspended.

Beaton became involved in the Students for a Democratic Society while in high school, and participated in a New Castle County student group opposed to the Vietnam War, and a peace rally in Rodney Square in Wilmington. He attended the University of Wisconsin–Madison where he was a roommate of activist David Fine in 1969. Beaton stated that he became frustrated with the atmosphere in Wisconsin, when he participated in peaceful protests that were met "with fierce police resistance". He returned to Delaware by October 1970, and was the spokesperson for a group of students protesting the "system of the ruling class necessitating Agnews" at a speech given by Spiro Agnew, the vice president of the United States. After attending an anti-war rally in March 1971, Beaton was acquitted of a disorderly conduct charge at the event. After David Fine was arrested in connection to the Sterling Hall bombing at the University of Wisconsin, Beaton became chairman of a fundraising committee to assist with the legal defense for Fine. By 1976, Beaton lived in Newark, Delaware, and graduated from the University of Delaware.

== Journalism career ==
Beaton became a reporter for The News Journal in Wilmington by September 1977. He reported on local high school sports then regularly wrote hockey columns on the Philadelphia Flyers. When USA Today was founded in 1982, Beaton was one of its original writers. He continued to write about hockey, in addition to baseball coverage for the Philadelphia Phillies and Baltimore Orioles. He also reported the Daytona 500, the Super Bowl, and the Winter Olympic Games.

The Professional Hockey Writers' Association (PHWA) elected Beaton its president from 1985 to 1987. The PHWA had annually chosen participants of the All-Star Game of the National Hockey League prior to the league's fans voting for the starting players as of the 1986 All-Star Game. As the PHWA president, he led the committee which nominated the players to appear on the ballot, ensuring that at least one player from each team was listed. He felt that the previous voting system by the PHWA had glitches, whereby players who received votes at both the center and winger positions did not accumulate enough votes at a single position to make the All-Star Game. When the league's fans voted Pelle Lindbergh as a starting goaltender in the 1986 game despite his death a few months earlier, Beaton doubted that the PHWA would have been chosen Lindbergh since its members were not sentimental and took the choice seriously. Beaton felt that the fans "had voted with reasonable intelligence", and choosing Lindbergh "was a quality gesture", but was disappointed when a deserving player did not play because fans voted for a long-term star instead.

Beaton focused solely on writing about baseball for USA Today since the late 1980s. He annually attended and reported on spring training, the Major League Baseball All-Star Game and the World Series. He traveled to Minor League Baseball games to watch the younger players and write about them prior to them making the major league. He was credited by The Washington Post journalist Matt Schudel for establishing a network to gather information, for writing columns that discussed prospect talent for each major league team, and for giving many future star players "their first national exposure".

"Back before the internet gave us so much information so easily about so many teams, if you wanted to learn something about teams outside of your home market ... you read Rod Beaton".

— Tom Verducci, Sports Illustrated

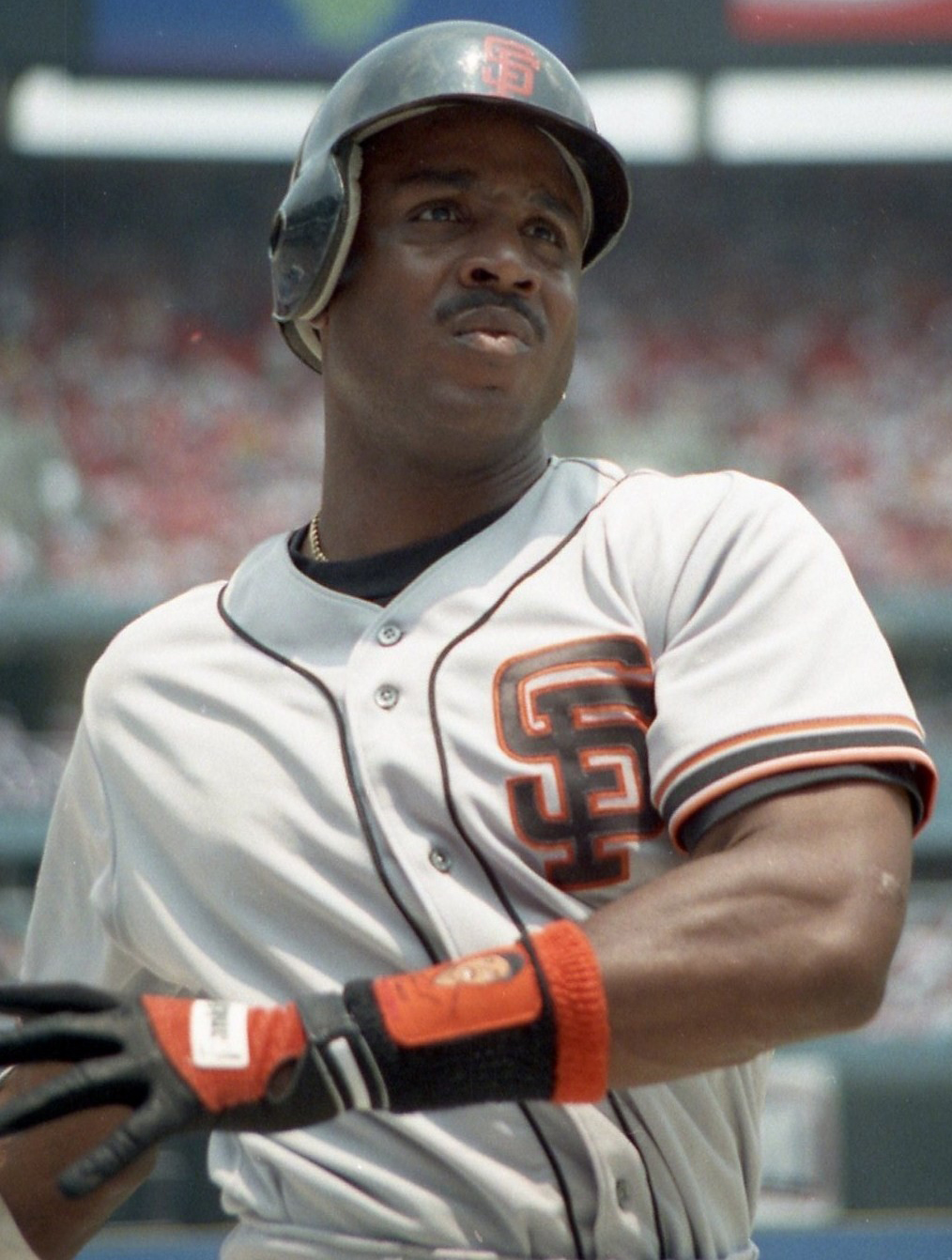
Barry Bonds, c. 1993

On May 9, 1996, Beaton and Barry Bonds of the San Francisco Giants were involved in a shoving incident in the team's clubhouse one hour before a game against the St. Louis Cardinals, while Beaton was waiting to interview Robby Thompson. Bonds told Beaton to leave, when Beaton replied that according to Major League Baseball rules, 15 minutes remained to talk with players. Bonds then waved a finger in Beaton's face and shoved him in the chest, when the incident was broken up by members of the team's coaching staff and front office. They spoke again after the game and Beaton said, "He accused me of having an attitude", and that "I told him he went over the line by shoving me, but there was no apology". Bonds felt that the incident was overblown and stated that, "We don't have a problem. We like each other. It was a big joke — he just got whacked out". Beaton did not file any formal complaint about the incident, despite USA Today filing a grievance with the team.

Several years later, Beaton and Bonds were at the same baseball gathering, where Beaton was unable to get up from a chair due to Parkinson's disease symptoms. Bonds helped Beaton get to his feet, while others walked by. According to Beaton's wife, he never criticized Bonds again. As Beaton's medical condition worsened, he retired from journalism in 2006.

== Reputation ==
Sports Illustrated writer Jeff Pearlman described Beaton as a journalist who was willing to assist younger writers and offer reassurance, and would not degrade a player just to get attention. Pearlman felt that Beaton wrote "in a voice that was authoritative and oft-funny", and that "Beaton guided his readers through the ups and downs of a season with precision, intelligence and understanding".

== Personal life ==
Beaton was married twice, and had two sons with his second wife, Maria. During the mid-1980s, his wife Maria worked in the stands at Memorial Stadium while he reported on the Baltimore Orioles. He resided in Herndon, Virginia, and enjoyed cooking baby back ribs and spicy chili.

Beaton's wife noticed a change in his behavior in the mid-1990s, which included occasional violent outbursts, increased anxiety, and mobility problems. In May 2000, he was diagnosed with Parkinson's disease. In 2006, his pacemaker was removed due to an infection. He had brain surgery three times since 2006, and moved to a nursing home in Arlington County, Virginia, as his faculties continued to decline. In 2007, his diagnosis was changed to dementia with Lewy bodies. He continued to watch baseball on television through the last months of his life. Beaton died on June 22, 2011, at age 59.
