= History of homeland security in the United States =

The history of homeland security in the United States covers specific issues and programs designed to protect the United States from foreign enemies or domestic terrorism. It also includes public attitudes regarding specific fears. Coverage is from the colonial period to the present.

== Coastal Defense 1800-1945 ==
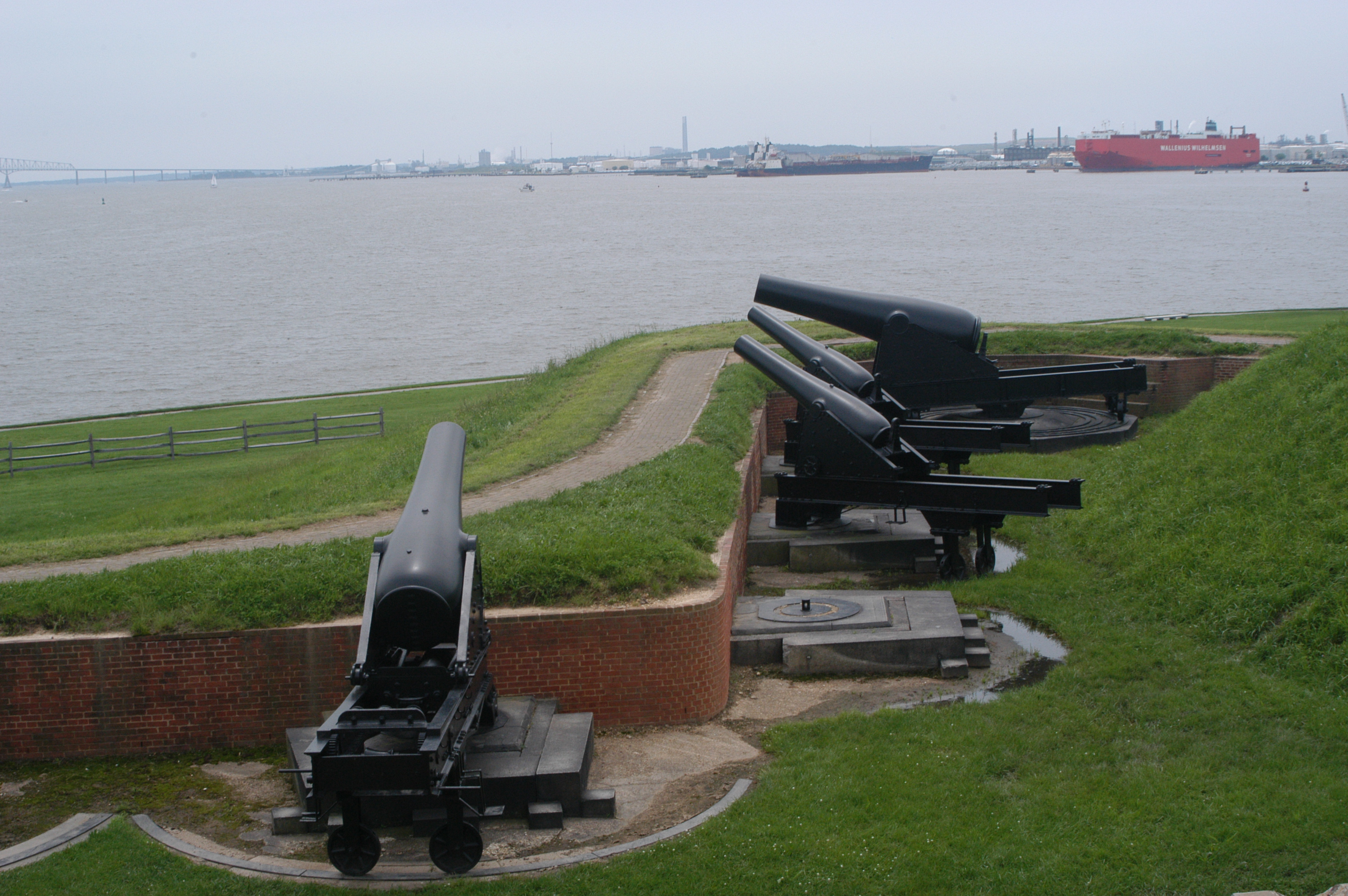
Fort McHenry in Baltimore harbor, typifies an early seacoast defense system prior to the War of 1812, with low earthworks. These cannons were added in late 19th century/

The U.S.A.'s coastal defense became a significant priority starting in 1776. Prior to the American Revolution many coastal fortifications already dotted the Atlantic coast, as protection from pirate raids and French incursions. The Revolutionary War led to the construction of many additional fortifications, mostly comprising simple earthworks erected to meet specific threats.

With Europe at war during 1793–1815, a new national program of fortification building was begun under the leadership of Alexander Hamilton and a Navy was built up by President John Adams. After 1801 President Thomas Jefferson minimized the Navy and set up the Second System to protect major ports by the use of small inexpensive gunboats manned by unpaid volunteers. The gunboats proved inadequate when facing the Royal Navy in the War of 1812. In the Third System set up in 1816, the Presidency of James Madison and the Presidency of James Monroe requested, and Congress funded, a defensive system along Atlantic harbors. It featured cast-iron, muzzle-loading cannon protected by masonry, and supported by a modern navy. Britain so fully dominated the world naval situation that peace prevailed and the system was never needed.

By the 1860s advances in steel armour and heavy guns rendered masonry forts obsolete. New steamships and ironclad warships could overcome Third System defenses.

In 1885 President Grover Cleveland appointed the Endicott Board, whose recommendations led to a large-scale modernization program of harbor and coastal defenses. It emphasized well dispersed, open topped reinforced concrete emplacements protected by sloped earthworks. Many of these featured disappearing guns, which sat protected behind the walls, but could be raised to fire. Underwater mine fields were a critical component of the defense, and smaller guns were also employed to protect the mine fields from minesweeping vessels. Defenses of a given harbor were initially designated artillery districts, redesignated as coast defense commands in 1913 and as harbor defense commands in 1924. In 1901 the Artillery Corps was divided into field artillery and coast artillery units, and in 1907 the United States Army Coast Artillery Corps was created to operate these defenses.

By 1917 the rapid development of military aviation rendered these open topped emplacements vulnerable to air attack. Therefore, the next, and last, generation of coastal artillery was mounted under thick concrete shields covered with vegetation to make them virtually invisible from above. The US Army adopted the French 155-millimeter Grande Puissance Filloux heavy field gun in 1917. Until 1944 it was the weapon of choice in coastal defense, with the circular or semicircular Panama mount. In anticipation of a conflict with Japan, most of the limited funds available between 1933 and 1938 were spent on the Pacific coast. In 1939–40 the threat of war in Europe prompted larger appropriations and the resumption of work along the Atlantic coast. Under a major program developed in the wake of the Fall of France in 1940, a near-total replacement of previous coast defenses was implemented, centered on 16-inch guns in new casemated batteries. These were supplemented by 6-inch and 90 mm guns, also in new installations.

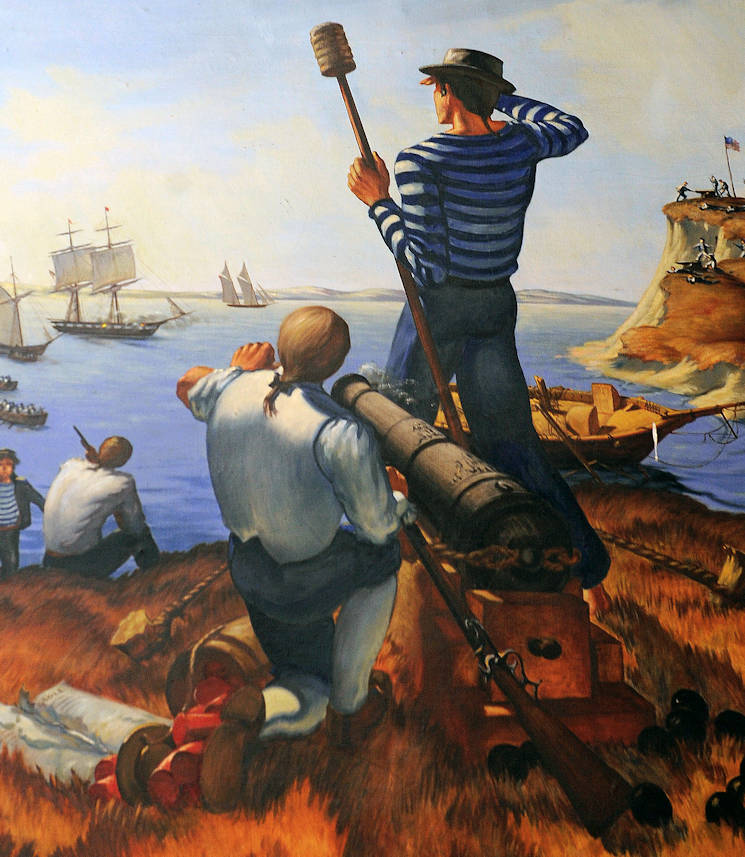
Defense of the cutter Eagle October 10–13, 1814; a painting from the Works Progress Administration

=== Coast Guard ===
The United States Coast Guard was created by Treasury Secretary Alexander Hamilton in 1790 when Congress authorized the construction of 10 vessels to enforce tariffs and prevent smuggling. This fleet was originally known as the Revenue Marine and later as the Revenue Cutter Service. In 1822, the Revenue Marine was merged with the Life-Saving Service, which was responsible for rescuing shipwreck victims, to form the modern Coast Guard. The service was later transferred to the Department of the Treasury before becoming part of the Department of Transportation in 1967 and eventually the Department of Homeland Security in 2003. Prior to 1900, the Coast Guard primarily focused on enforcing tariffs, preventing smuggling, and rescuing shipwreck victims.

In June 1942 during World War II a Coast Guard patrol of the beach in Amagansett, New York, discovered the landing of German saboteurs in Operation Pastorius. The 8-man sabotage team was soon captured and executed.

== Anti-Masonic fears, 1820s-1830s ==
The Freemasons are a secret fraternal group that originated in Europe and became popular in elite circles in the United States in the late 18th and early 19th centuries. Members are sworn to secrecy about who belongs and what they do. In the U.S., popular fears emerged that the aim of Freemasonry was "to overthrow the established religion and government in every country in the world". In 1826, William Morgan disappeared from the small town of Batavia, New York. Rumors spread that he had been kidnapped by Freemasons and murdered after threatening to expose Freemasonry's secrets by publishing its rituals. Morgan's disappearance sparked a series of protests and suspicion against Freemasonry, which eventually spread to the political realm. Andrew Jackson a highly controversial politician was a Mason and one of his enemies Thurlow Weed set up a movement that became the Anti-Masonic Party. This political Party ran presidential candidates in 1828 and 1832, and elected local and state officials. They elected William A. Palmer governor of Vermont and Joseph Ritner governor of Pennsylvania. By 1835 the party had disbanded everywhere except Pennsylvania., but

John Quincy Adams, president of the United States during the Morgan affair, ran for governor of Massachusetts on the Anti-Masonic ticket in 1833. He denounced the Freemasons, declaring:

I do conscientiously and sincerely believe that the Order of Freemasonry, if not the greatest, is one of the greatest moral and political evils under which the Union is now laboring ... a conspiracy of the few against the equal rights of the many ...Masonry ought forever to be abolished. It is wrong - essentially wrong - a seed of evil, which can never produce any good.

Though few states passed laws directed at Freemasonry by name, laws regulating and restricting it were passed and many cases dealing with Freemasonry were seen in the courts. Antimasonic legislation was passed in Vermont in 1833, including a provision by which the giving and willing taking of an unnecessary oath was made a crime. The state of New York enacted a Benevolent Orders Law to regulate such organizations. Freemason membership declined sharply, and the Antimasons like Adams transferred their deep concern to antislavery.

== Catholic threat 1840s-1928 ==
The arrival after 1840 of hundreds of thousands and indeed millions of Catholic immigrants from Europe, especially Ireland and Germany, ignited a Protestant nativist fear for American security. Henry Winter Davis, an active Know-Nothing, was elected in 1854 on the new "American Party" ticket to Congress from Maryland. He told Congress that the un-American Irish Catholic immigrants were to blame for the recent election of Democrat James Buchanan as president, stating in 1856:

The recent election has developed in an aggravated form every evil against which the American party protested. Foreign allies have decided the government of the country -- men naturalized in thousands on the eve of the election. Again in the fierce struggle for supremacy, men have forgotten the ban which the Republic puts on the intrusion of religious influence on the political arena. These influences have brought vast multitudes of foreign-born citizens to the polls, ignorant of American interests, without American feelings, influenced by foreign sympathies, to vote on American affairs; and those votes have, in point of fact, accomplished the present result.

The nativist rhetoric reawakened old historic fears based in British history regarding the threat of the Catholic Church. The new fear was that the Catholics were controlled by their priests, who in turn were controlled by their bishops, who in turn were controlled by the Pope in Rome. Their votes would all be dictated and be hostile to American values. The early success of the Irish in Boston and New York to gain political influence underlined the threat. The Protestant fear was that Catholics would disregard fair election procedures and thereby threatened to ruin the democratic process. Furthermore, the Catholics were brought unprecedented violence poverty and disease to newly emerging slums. The main result was explosive overnight growth of the Know Nothing party in the mid-1850s, it briefly came to power in Massachusetts and nearby states. However the Know Nothing leadership was weak and it had few strong leaders and seldom won reelection.

By 1860, overshadowed by issues of slavery and civil war, anticatholicism faded. The Catholic support for the Union in the Civil War demonstrated they were good citizens willing to fight for their new country, and most fears dissipated by 1865. But not all, there was a resurgence of anti-Catholicism in the American Protective Association of the late 1880s, The nomination of a Catholic for president in 1928 focused attention on Al Smith, a liberal Democrat in aa largely conservative era. His opposition to prohibition and his long-standing ties with Tammany Hall in New York City made Catholicism a political factor. The negative aspects were largely muted until John F. Kennedy ran for president in 1960, when his religion increased his vote. The election of a Catholic as president in 2020 was remarkable in how little attention was paid to Joe Biden's religion. After his 8 years as vice president and after a rhetorically nasty campaign in 2020, only 58% of the voters knew he was a Catholic.

== Slave rebellions ==
=== 1850s ===
Prior to the American Civil War, abolitionist John Brown (1800–1859) advocated and practiced armed opposition to slavery, launching several attacks between 1856 and 1859, his most famous attack was launched against the armory at Harpers Ferry in 1859. Local forces soon recaptured the fort and Brown was tried and executed for treason. A biographer of Brown has written that Brown's purpose was "to force the nation into a new political pattern by creating terror." In 2009, the 150th anniversary of Brown's death, prominent news publications debated over whether or not Brown should be considered a terrorist.

== Civil War 1861-1865 ==
The United States government made it a high priority to keep Britain and France from recognizing the Confederacy—threatening war if they did so. The Union diplomacy was successful. In late 1861 the Union Navy seized a British ship and took off Confederate diplomats. Union public opinion celebrated but London strongly objected and sent soldiers to Canada. Lincoln sent the diplomats back and the Trent Affair ended quietly. The Confederacy falsely believed that "Cotton is King" and that Britain and France would intervene to protect the cotton supply. The French government wanted to intervene, but needed British help. Top officials in London favored the Confederacy, but realized that much of its food supply came from the North, and in a war the Union navy would sink much of the British merchant fleet. wanted British and French intervention, but its diplomacy was poor. Its main success was borrowing some cash used to spread propaganda, and in getting Britain to build a warship "CSS Alabama" that captured American merchant ships. After the war London paid Washington $15.5 million for the damages.

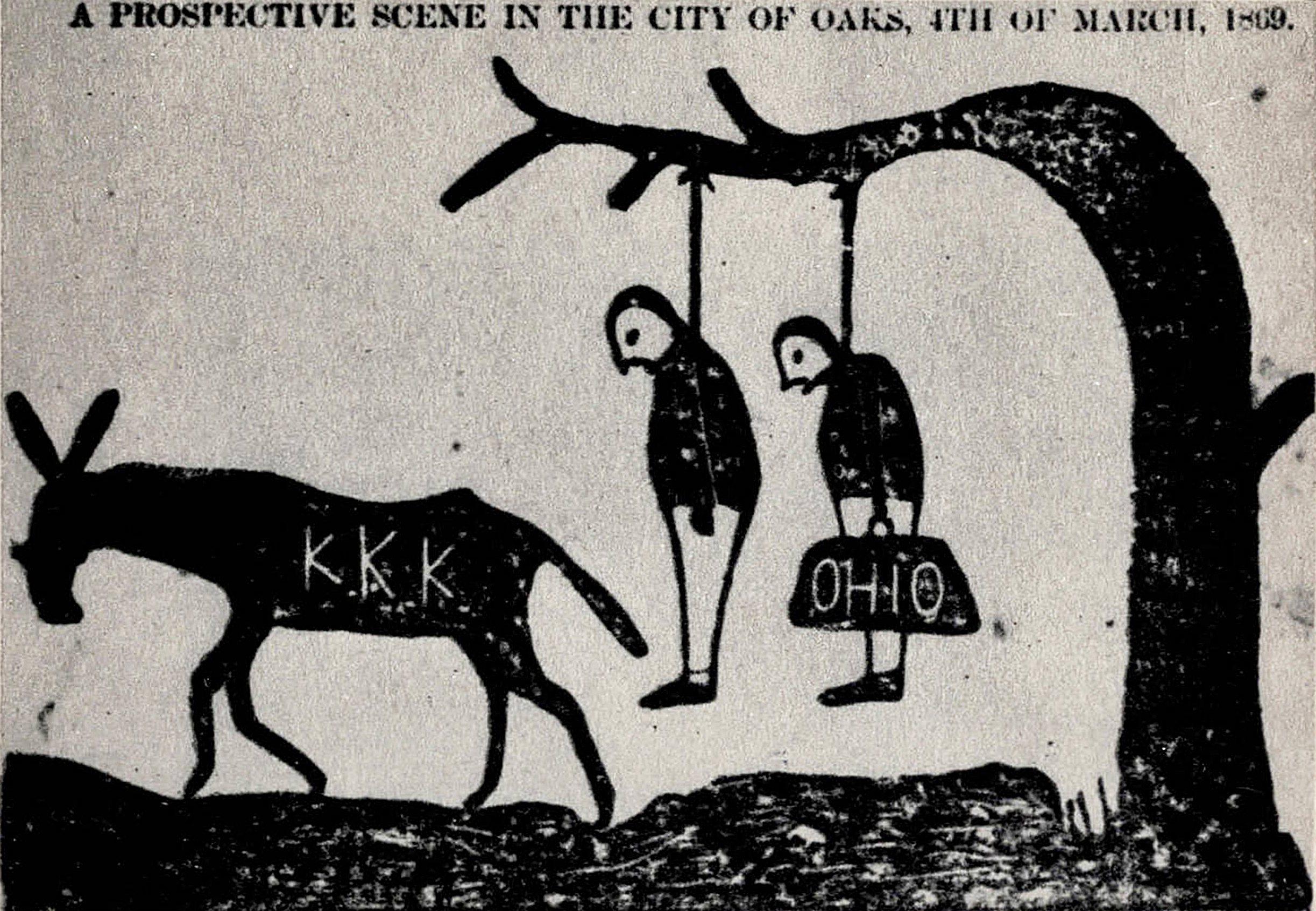
An editorial cartoon threatening that the KKK will lynch carpetbaggers, in the Independent Monitor, Tuscaloosa, Alabama, 1868

== Ku Klux Klan terrorism, 1866-1870s ==
During the Reconstruction era in December, 1865, six Confederate veterans founded the Ku Klux Klan (KKK). With the Union Army in charge of the South, the secret society soon spread across the region. The KKK used violence, lynching, murder and acts of intimidation such as cross burning to oppress newly freed African Americans, as well as "Carpetbaggers" (new arrivals from the North) who worked with blacks in the Republican Party. The Klan's political goal was a return to white supremacist. Each local was entirely independent and focused on its own vicinity; there was no central direction above the local level. President Ulysses S. Grant was determined to stamp out terrorism but first he asked Congress for new laws on March 23, 1871:

A condition of affairs now exists in some of the States of the Union rendering life and property insecure, and the carrying of the mails and the collection of the revenue dangerous....That the power to correct these evils is beyond the control of State authorities, I do not doubt. That the power of the Executive of the United States, acting within the limits of existing laws, is sufficient for present emergencies, is not clear.

The new laws allowed Grant's team to suppress the Klan in the early 1870s. It disappeared by the mid-1870s. The KKK of the 1920s was an entirely new secret organization with a nationwide membership in the millions. It copied the original Klan white uniforms and used some of the same titles.

== Vigilante committees 1850-1920 ==
In areas with inadequate law enforcement agencies, especially in the newly settled American Frontier, concerned citizens formed extra-legal "vigilance committees." The goals were to maintain law and order and administer summary justice where governmental law enforcement was inadequate. In frontier areas they promised security and mediated land disputes. In ranching areas, they ruled on ranch boundaries, registered brands, and protected cattle and horses. In the mining districts, they protected claims, settled claim disputes, and attempted to protect miners and other residents. The committees closed down when stable legal systems appeared. The most famous committees operated in San Francisco in the 1850s

Whitecapping and Night riders emerged in Kentucky, West Virginia, and nearby poor rural areas in the late 19th century. These were secret vigilante committees aimed at suppressing local criminal gangs in rural areas. In the "Black Patch war" poor tobacco farmers in Kentucky and Tennessee fought against the monopoly American Tobacco Company that paid low prices for tobacco. The vigilantes threatened farmers that sold their crops to the monopoly.

In 1900 a conspiracy led by Republican politicians assassinated William Goebel, newly elected Democratic governor of Kentucky because he had seized control of the machinery of the state and seemed on the verge of becoming a local dictator.

== Indian wars, 1860-1890 ==
The Indian wars involved attacks by the Indians on White settlers and railroads, and the attacks by the US army on Indian braves off the reservation. The arena was the contest for control between the expanding American railway and ranching system versus the expanding Sioux and Comanche domains based on buffalo hunts. The US Army had the role of keeping the two apart, using lethal force against the Indians. Consequently, the western frontier saw very high levels of organized and unorganized violence between settlers and Indians, with the army playing a major role in keeping transportation lines open, keeping feuding tribes apart, and moving Indians back to their reservations. Another perspective of course is out of the white threat to Indian homeland security. The national policy was that Native Americans had two choices: they could enter the main society and be subject to state government laws like everyone else, or they could live on designated reservations, largely subsidized by the federal government, where they had self-government. What was not allowed were Indian warriors leaving the reservation to attack other tribes, or whites.

Sympathies have reversed over time, now favoring the Indians today rather than Colonel Custer. However at the time the American public demanded and got federal action to guarantee security in the West. Given the enormous attention in film fiction and folklore to these episodes, and it is likely they have shaped American sensibilities regarding the need for homeland security. The new emphasis includes systematic maltreatment of the Indians. Multiple solutions were attempted, including: Lincoln's aggressive policy against the Sioux 1862; Army imprisonment of the entire Navajo tribe in 1864; the Colorado militia's Sand Creek massacre of innocent Indians in 1864; civil war between tribes in Oklahoma 1861–1865; building a network of army forts to control the Plains; President Grant's peace policy and sending in the missionaries; enforcement of a tough reservation policy; destruction of the buffalo (the food supply of the nomads); Dawes Act requiring Indians to become farmers; and the forced assimilation via federal Indian schools.

== Lynching, 1870s-1920s ==
The Jim Crow era accompanied the most cruel wave of "racial" suppression that America has yet experienced. Between 1890 and 1940, millions of African Americans were disenfranchised and brutalized. According to newspaper records kept at the Tuskegee Institute, about 5,000 were murdered in documented extrajudicial mob violence—called "lynchings." The journalist Ida B. Wells estimated that lynchings not reported by the newspapers, plus similar executions under the veneer of "due process", may have amounted to about 20,000 killings.

Of the tens of thousands of lynchers and onlookers during this period, it is reported that fewer than 50 whites were ever indicted for their crimes, and only four were sentenced. Because Black people were disenfranchised, they could not sit on juries or have any part in the political process, including local offices. Meanwhile, the lynchings were used as a weapon of terror to keep millions of African-Americans living in a constant state of anxiety and fear. Most Black people were denied their right to keep and bear arms under Jim Crow laws, and they were therefore unable to protect themselves or their families.

== Anarchism ==
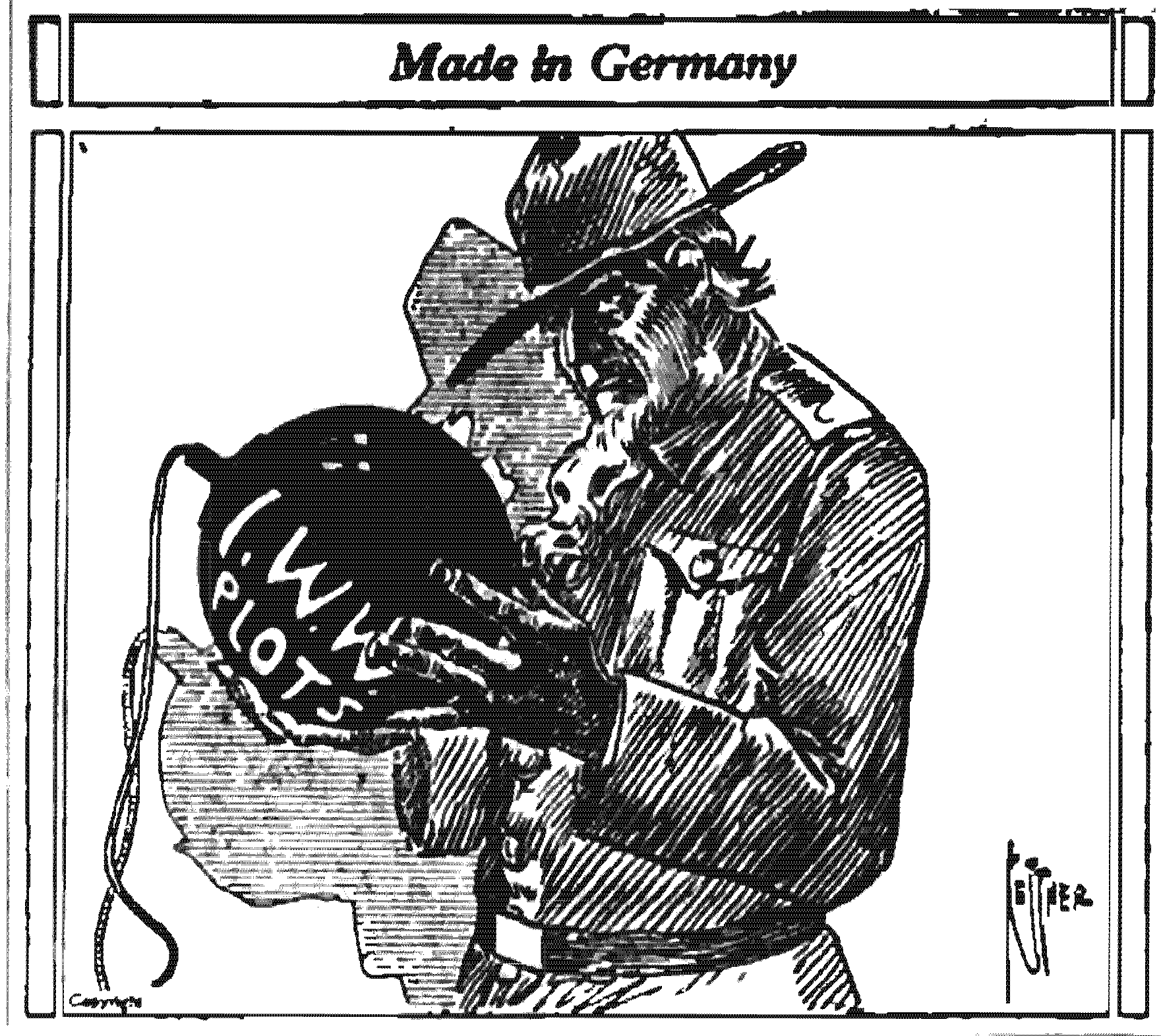
A newspaper editorial cartoon from October 1917, calling the IWW's antiwar stance an anti-American plot made in Germany

== Opposition to World War I ==
The Espionage Act of 1917 and the Sedition Act of 1918 punished activity supporting the enemy war effort, or activity reducing support for the American war effort. The Sedition Act criminalized any expression of opinion that used "disloyal, profane, scurrilous or abusive language" about the U.S. government, flag or armed forces. Government police action, private vigilante groups, and public war hysteria compromised the peacetime civil liberties of many Americans who opposed the nation's policies. In March 1919 the Supreme Court upheld the convictions in a unanimous opinion:

When a nation is at war many things that might be said in time of peace are such a hindrance to its effort that their utterance will not be endured. . . . The question is whether the words used are used in such circumstances and are of such a nature as to create a clear and present danger that they will bring about the substantive evils that Congress has a right to prevent.

The most dramatic case was the conviction of Socialist Party leader Eugene V. Debs for encouraging young men to defy the draft laws. After the war ended all those convicted were pardoned.

The private American Protective League was the largest of many private patriotic associations that sprang up to support the war by identifying slackers, spies, draft dodgers and anti-war organizations. They worked with the new Federal Bureau of Investigation.

The strongest repression affected antiwar groups in the Western states. The main target was the Industrial Workers of the World, which was effectively closed down by convictions in federal court.

== First Red Scare ==
The First Red Scare of 1919-1920 was marked by a widespread fear of far-left movements, including Bolshevism and anarchism, due to real and imagined events. Real events included the Russian 1917 October Revolution and anarchist bombings. At its height, concerns over the effects of radical political agitation in American society and the alleged spread of socialism, communism and anarchism in the American labor movement fueled a general sense of concern.

The Scare had its origins in the hyper-nationalism of World War I as well as the Bolshevik success in the Russian Revolution. Americans saw the factor of communist action in several labor union areas, such as the Seattle General Strike and the Boston Police Strike. Most alarming was the bombing campaign directed by anarchist groups at political and business leaders. Fueled by labor unrest and the anarchist bombings, and then spurred on by the Palmer Raids and attempts by United States Attorney General A. Mitchell Palmer to suppress radical organizations, it was characterized by exaggerated rhetoric, illegal search and seizures, unwarranted arrests and detentions, and the deportation of several hundred suspected radicals and anarchists. In addition, the growing anti-immigration nativist movement among Americans viewed increasing immigration from Southern Europe and Eastern Europe as a threat to American political and social stability.

Fear of radicalism was used to explain the suppression of freedom of expression in the form of display of certain flags and banners. In April 1920, concerns peaked with J. Edgar Hoover telling the nation to prepare for a bloody uprising on May Day. Police and militias prepared for the worst, but May Day passed without incident. Soon, public opinion and the courts turned against Palmer, putting an end to his raids and the First Red Scare.

== Department of Homeland Security ==
The Department of Homeland Security (DHS), created in 2002, is responsible for public security, roughly comparable to the interior or home ministries of other countries. Its stated missions involve anti-terrorism, border security, immigration and customs, cyber security, and disaster prevention and management.

It began operations in 2003, formed as a result of the Homeland Security Act of 2002, enacted in response to the September 11 attacks. With more than 240,000 employees, DHS is the third-largest cabinet department

Homeland security policy is coordinated at the Presidential level by the Homeland Security Council. Other agencies with significant homeland security responsibilities include the Departments of Health and Human Services, Justice, and Energy.

== Epidemics ==
Weekly confirmed COVID-19 deaths

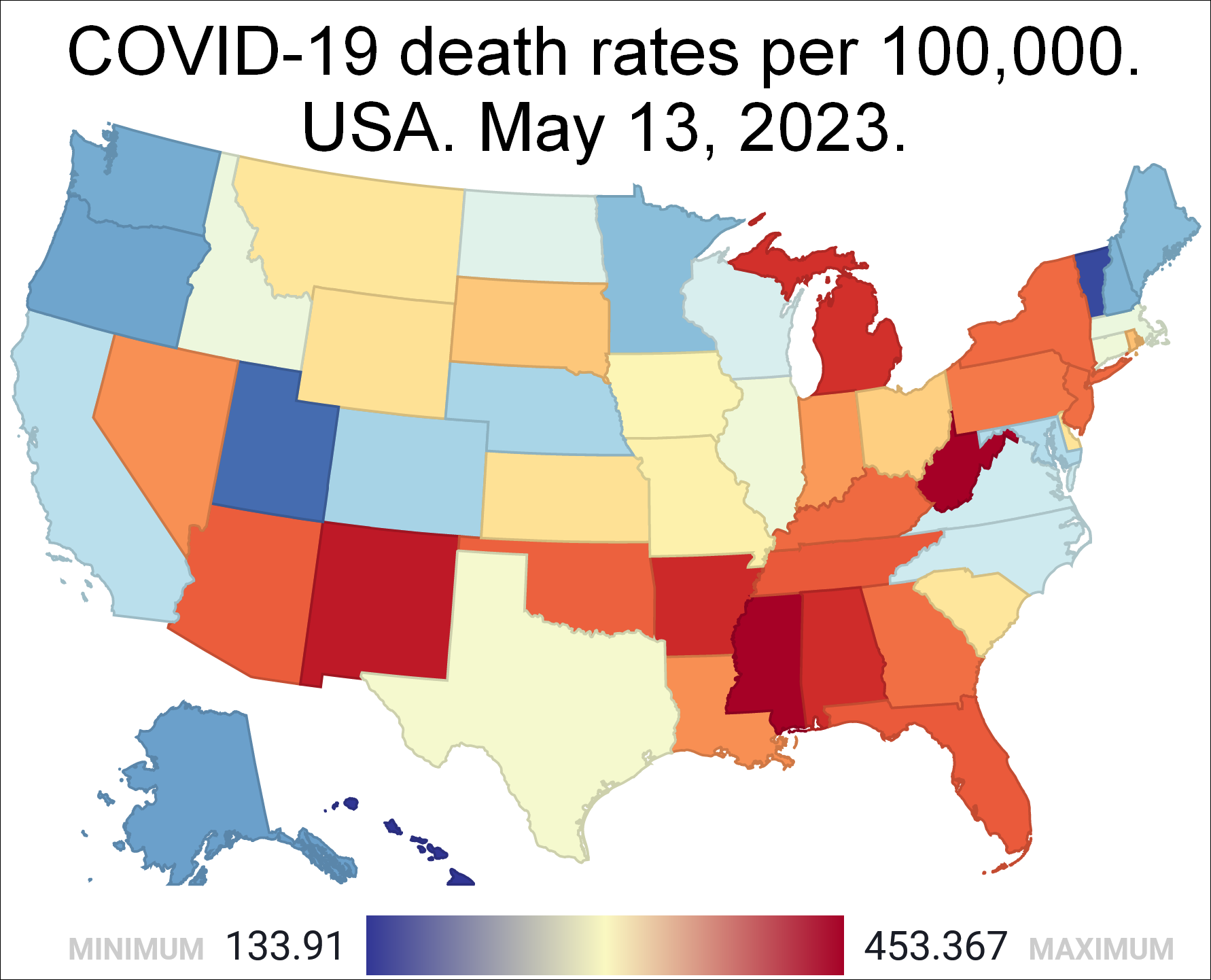
Cumulative COVID-19 death rates by state. 2021 and 2022.

== See also ==
- Alien and Sedition Acts, of 1798
- Civil defense in the United States
- Conspiracy theories in United States politics
- Espionage Act of 1917
  - Sedition Act of 1918
- Federal Emergency Management Agency, FEMA
- History of the United States Coast Guard
- Homeland security
  - Homeland Security Act of 2002
  - United States Department of Homeland Security
  - National Strategy for Homeland Security, response to 9-11 in 2001
- Illegal immigration to the United States
- Jihadist extremism in the United States
- List of attacks on U.S. territory
- List of incidents of civil unrest in the United States
- List of massacres in the United States
- List of organizations designated by the Southern Poverty Law Center as hate groups
- Lynching in the United States
- Mass racial violence in the United States
- Terrorism in the United States
  - Domestic terrorism in the United States
  - Outline of terrorism in the United States
  - Timeline of terrorist attacks in the United States
  - Right-wing terrorism
- United States Department of Homeland Security
- Vigilantism
- Xenophobia in the United States
