= The War at Home (1979 film) =

1979 film

- Directed by: Glenn Silber; Barry Alexander Brown
- Produced by: Glenn Silber; Barry Alexander Brown
- Narrated by: Blake Kellogg
- Cinematography: Dan Lerner, Richard March
- Edited by: Chuck France
- Production companies: Catalyst Films; Wisconsin Educational Television Network
- Distributed by: New Front Films
- Release date: 1979
- Running time: 100 minutes
- Country: United States
- Language: English

The War at Home is a documentary film about the anti-war movement in the Madison, Wisconsin, area during the time of the Vietnam War. It combines archival footage and interviews with participants that explore the events of the period on the University of Wisconsin–Madison campus. The film was nominated for an Academy Award for Best Documentary Feature.

== Synopsis ==
The film focuses on student protests of government policies in the Vietnam War, clashes between students and police, and the responses of politicians and the public to the turmoil. Among the major events included is the Sterling Hall bombing. Intended to destroy the Army Math Research Center in the building, the bombing also caused massive destruction to other parts of the building, resulting in the death of a physics researcher, Robert Fassnacht, who was not involved in the Army Math Research Center. Bomber Karleton Armstrong, brother of Dwight Armstrong, is interviewed for the film, as is Paul Soglin, an antiwar leader who went on to be mayor of Madison.

== Reception and legacy ==
It earned an Academy Award for Best Documentary Feature nomination.

After self-releasing The War at Home, Barry Alexander Brown co-founded the distribution company First Run Features.

Dialogue from The War at Home was used as samples in the song “Thieves” by the band Ministry on the 1989 album The Mind is a Terrible Thing to Taste.

Viewing the film after its recent restoration, Peter Canby writes in The New Yorker:

The film covers the period from 1963—when the earliest demonstrators wore jackets and ties, in some cases smoked pipes, and attended teach-ins—to 1973. Along the way, there is extensive footage from dramatic Madison developments, including a police attack on antiwar demonstrators who had seized a campus building to protest the visit of Dow Chemical recruiters to campus. (Dow was the maker of napalm.) In that episode, the police clubbed—pretty much unprovoked—anyone they could get their hands on. In an unintentionally humorous moment, captured on film, a sociology professor named Maurice Zeitlin remembers students rushing in and asking him to talk sense to the police. Zeitlin runs out of his office, only to be clubbed from behind.

Bill Siegel, director of The Trials of Muhammad Ali, was inspired to become a filmmaker after seeing the film.

== Availability ==
In 2018, the film was restored in 4K by IndieCollect and re-released.
