= The Daily Cardinal =

Student newspaper of the University of Wisconsin–Madison

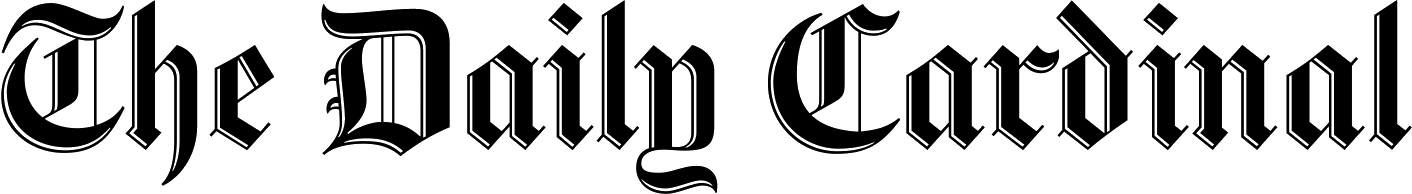

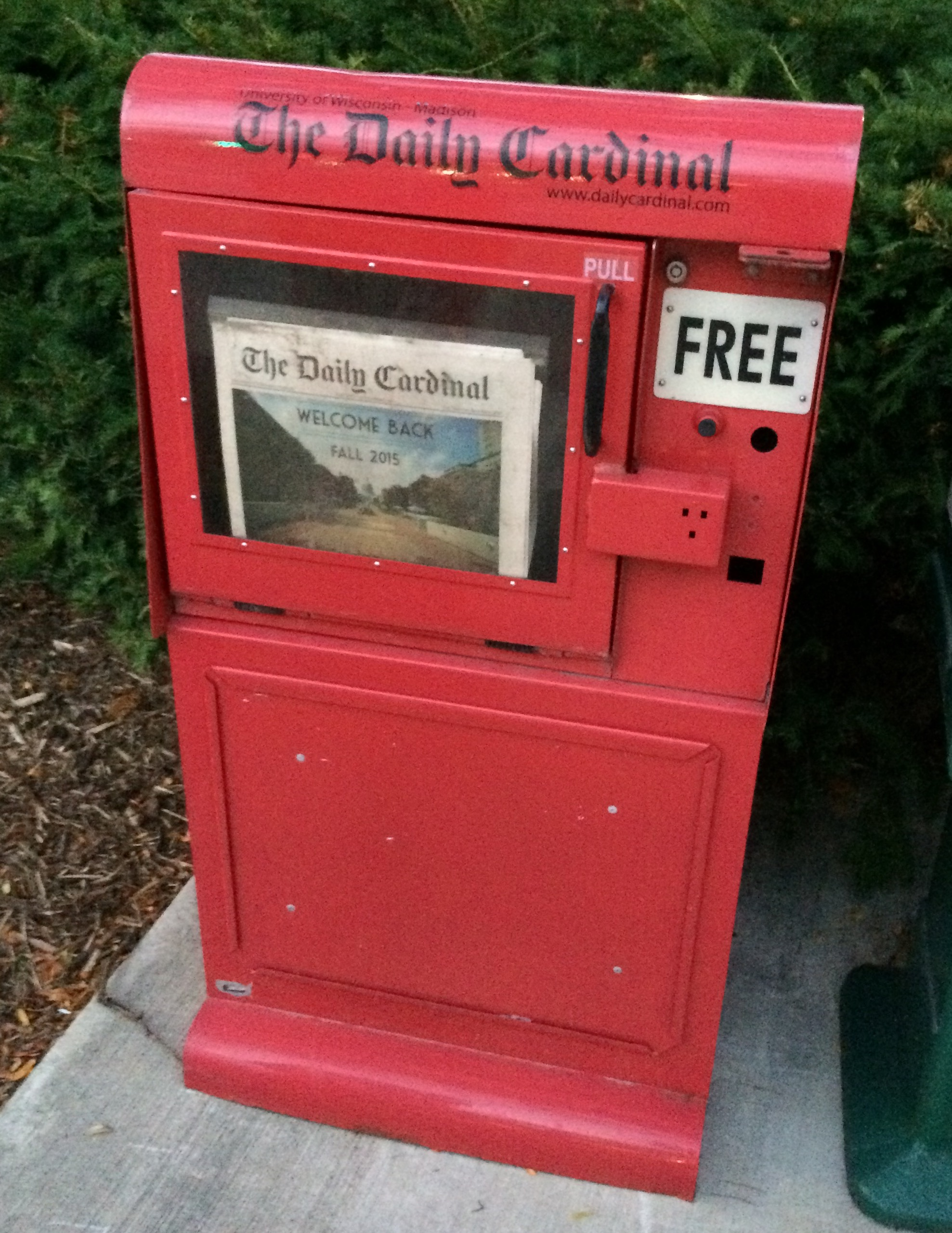
- Daily Cardinal newspaper box featuring Fall 2015 Welcome Back issue
- Type: Student newspaper
- Format: Tabloid
- School: University of Wisconsin–Madison
- Owner: The Daily Cardinal Media Corporation
- Editor-in-chief: Alaina Walsh
- Managing editor: Avery Chheda
- Founded: 1892
- Political alignment: Moderate, leaning liberal
- Headquarters: Madison, Wisconsin, US
- Website: dailycardinal.com

The Daily Cardinal is a student newspaper that serves the University of Wisconsin–Madison community. One of the oldest student newspapers in the country, it began publishing on Monday, April 4, 1892. The newspaper is financially and editorially independent of the university.

The Cardinal's motto, printed at the bottom of every front page and taken from an 1894 declaration by the university's board of regents, is "...the great state University of Wisconsin should ever encourage that continual and fearless sifting and winnowing by which alone the truth can be found."

== Circulation ==
The Daily Cardinal is published Thursdays during the academic year in a tabloid print format and maintains an independent website with fresh content each day. The print press run of 10,000 is distributed throughout the campus community. Nearly 200 undergraduate and graduate student volunteers and employees work at the paper. Its daily sections include News, Opinion, Arts and Sports, and its weekly sections are Features, Life & Style and Science.

== Awards ==
In 2001, 2002, 2005, 2006, 2013 and 2022, the Cardinal was the recipient of the Society of Professional Journalists Mark of Excellence award for best daily college newspaper of the year in Region 6 (Minnesota, North Dakota, South Dakota and Wisconsin).

Since 2000, the Cardinal has won 64 awards from the SPJ and Associated Collegiate Press, 58 regional and 6 national.

The Cardinal won first place for General Excellence in the Wisconsin Newspaper Association's 2022 and 2023 Collegiate Better Newspaper Contest, generally considered the top honors for the respective competitions.

== History ==
=== Beginning of sifting and winnowing: 1892–1932 ===
The Daily Cardinal was founded as a rival to the monthly student paper Aegis, by Monroe, Wisconsin native William Wesley Young, the brother of cartoonist Art Young and the University of Wisconsin–Madison's first journalism student, and Willard T. Saucerman. Four hundred free copies of the paper were made available to Wisconsin students on April 4, 1892, the first day of the 1892 Spring term. For the first month of production, Young rode his horse down State Street to the offices of the Madison Democrat, which printed the Cardinal. The newspaper's name was decided by a vote of university students, "Cardinal" representing one of the school colors.

During the early years of the paper, the founder of the university's journalism school, Willard G. Bleyer, was a reporter and editor as an undergraduate. The experience was formative in his views on the teaching of journalism.

While against World War I at its outset, the Cardinal developed favorable attitudes toward the war, especially following the November 11, 1918, armistice. The Cardinal did not initially support the Second World War either, but later added special military sections to the paper to help coordinate the war effort.

=== Making an impression: 1932–1960 ===
During the Great Depression the Cardinal first earned its reputation for radicalism. Disagreeing with a policy of mandatory military training for male undergraduates to prepare for the impending World War II and running a letter to the editor signed by Junior Women discussing free love led U.S. Senate nominee John B. Chapple to declare that the Cardinal was controlled by "Reds, Atheists and free love advocates". The UW Board of Regents revoked the Cardinal’s title as "official University newspaper" following this discourse and threatened to close the paper down until a compromise added a faculty member and a regent to the Cardinal board.

In 1940, the Cardinal moved out of its office east of Memorial Union to a building on University Avenue, on the land where Vilas Communication Hall sits today. In 1956, the Cardinal board donated the land to the university in an agreement stipulating that the Cardinal would enjoy rent-free tenancy in the new building. The Cardinal's offices remain in Vilas Hall today.

In 1942, Cardinal founder Young returned to edit the paper for a day. The New York Times wrote on the occasion, "Despite annual changes in student staffs, a few college newspapers in the country have acquired a definite character. One of these is the Daily Cardinal of the University of Wisconsin–Madison. The Cardinal is proud of its liberal tradition. Because it fights cleanly and with a sense of responsibility, its youthful passion for righteousness does not burn less brightly."

=== Radical reputation: 1960–1988 ===
During the 1960s, the Cardinal developed a national reputation for its vehement far-left politics. They were the first American newspaper to send reporters to Cuba, and after two of the Cardinal’s editors and two other campus radicals carried out the largest and most destructive car bomb attack until that point in United States history, the Sterling Hall bombing, the Cardinal ran editorials endorsing the bombing. They ran several editorials strongly protesting the Vietnam War and supporting causes of Civil Rights. In 1969, a group of conservative UW students, frustrated by the Cardinal’s unrelenting liberalism, founded The Badger Herald as a right-wing alternative. Until recently, UW–Madison was one of few American universities with competing daily news publications, though starting in 2014 that competition largely shifted online with the Cardinal cutting Friday editions and the Herald publishing print issues once a week.

The 1970s saw the Cardinal maintain its strong issue advocacy, but opinion began to shift to more campus, rather than national, angles. In the last half of the decade, the paper continually attacked the university for its holdings in corporations that participated in apartheid in South Africa.

In 1987, the Cardinal survived a hostile takeover attempt by the Herald when then-president of the Daily Cardinal Board of Directors David Atkins conspired with Herald Publisher Richard Ausman to hire Herald staffers for Cardinal leadership positions and eventually merge the papers. The same year, it became free, and has remained so until this day.

=== Strife and shutdown: 1988–1995 ===
In the beginning of the difficult stretch for the Cardinal, in 1988 the university announced it would shut down the paper's presses, then located in Vilas Hall. Fortunately for the Cardinal, the university decided to sell the presses to UW–Extension, which remained the Cardinal’s printer for the next five years. Today, the Cardinal is printed at Capital Newspapers.

In 1995, the Cardinal was forced to stop printing due to financial issues, suffering a seven-month shutdown until the necessary funds were secured to return to publication.

=== The Cardinal reborn: 1995–present ===
The Cardinal returned to campus later that year with a cover depicting a cardinal rising from ashes like a phoenix. For several months in 1997, the Cardinal was again shut down by competition from The Onion satire newspaper drawing away its advertisers.

In 2000, the Cardinal broke the story that university officials had digitally inserted a black student's face into a photograph of white Badger football fans. The image had been used on the cover of Wisconsin's 2001–02 undergraduate application. The story received the 2001 Diversity Story of the Year award for student journalism, awarded by the Associated Collegiate Press and the Los Angeles Times.

In 2012, the Cardinal celebrated the 120th anniversary of its first publication with an alumni gathering featuring presentations by former Cardinal staffers who had gone on to win Pulitzer prizes and Emmy awards, a gala banquet at the nearby Orpheum Theater and a tribute to Anthony Shadid, who had died earlier in the year.

In November 2015, the Cardinal announced it would begin a new publication schedule by publishing two print issues per week while also moving to a new online platform, effective with the start of the spring semester. The new publishing schedule, following a similar cut in print publishing by the Herald the previous year, left the UW–Madison campus without a daily newspaper print edition for the first time in decades.

=== Official history ===
It Doesn't End With Us, the official history of The Daily Cardinal, was published in 2007.

== Notable alumni ==
=== Academia ===
- Eric Allen, founder of the journalism school at the University of Oregon
- Willard Grosvenor Bleyer, founder of the journalism school at the University of Wisconsin
- Allan W. Ostar, first president of the American Association of State Colleges and Universities

=== Television News ===
- Lowell Bergman, former 60 Minutes producer and tobacco industry whistleblower, portrayed in The Insider by Al Pacino; 2004 Pulitzer Prize winner; 2000, 2003 Peabody Award winner
- Rita Braver, senior correspondent, CBS News Sunday Morning
- Peter Greenberg, CBS news travel editor, multi Emmy Award winner
- Jeff Greenfield, CBS senior political analyst
- Ben Karlin, former The Daily Show executive producer; 2000, 2004 Peabody Award winner
- Andy Katz, ESPN senior basketball writer
- Edwin Newman, NBC anchorman; 1967 Peabody Award winner

=== Print News ===
- Walt Bogdanich, 1988, 2005, 2008 Pulitzer Prize winner
- William Broad, science writer, New York Times, 1986, 1987 Pulitzer Prize winner
- John Darnton, New York Times features editor, 1982 Pulitzer Prize winner
- Thomas Derpinghaus, South China Morning Post Editor (2023–present)
- Laurence Eklund, Milwaukee Journal Washington bureau chief (1947–1970)
- Tim Keck, co-founder of The Onion and founder of The Stranger
- Richard Leonard, former executive editor of Milwaukee Journal
- Irwin Maier, former chairman of the Journal Company, publisher of the Milwaukee Journal and Milwaukee Sentinel
- Karl E. Meyer, former New York Times editorial board member
- Eric Newhouse, 2000 Pulitzer Prize winner while at the Great Falls Tribune
- Miriam Ottenberg, 1960 Pulitzer Prize Winner while at The Washington Star
- Naomi Patton, 2009 Pulitzer Prize Winner while at the Detroit Free Press; SVP, Media Relations, Bank of America
- Richard Schickel, film critic, Time
- Anthony Shadid, New York Times reporter, 2004, 2010 Pulitzer Prize winner while at the Washington Post
- Neal Ulevich, 1977 Pulitzer Prize winner while at the Associated Press
- Dave Umhoefer, 2008 Pulitzer Prize winner while at the Milwaukee Journal
- Austin Wehrwein, 1953 Pulitzer Prize winner while at the Milwaukee Journal

=== Entertainment ===
- Mike Baron, comic author, creator of Badger
- Scott Dikkers, co-founder and editor-in-chief of The Onion, Jim's Journal cartoonist
- Steven Grant, comic writer, The Punisher, The Avengers
- Adam Horowitz, co-executive producer of Lost
- John Kovalic, Dork Tower cartoonist
- Danny Peary, film critic and author of the Cult Movies book series
- James Sturm, cartoonist
- Stephen Thompson, NPR music producer and former The A.V. Club editor
- Dan Vebber, writer and supervising producer of American Dad!, writer for the 78th annual Academy Awards
- Allee Willis, songwriter; Grammy winner
- Tom Wopat, actor

=== Other notable alumni ===
- Paul Soglin, former Madison mayor
- Milton Erickson, psychiatrist
- David Fine and Leo Burt, co-conspirators of the Sterling Hall bombing
- H. Jack Geiger, medical scholar, human rights activist, and Nobel Prize winner
