= Susan Coppersmith =

American condensed matter physicist

Susan Coppersmith FRSN FAA
- Born: March 18, 1957 (age 69); Johnstown, Pennsylvania
- Education: Massachusetts Institute of Technology (B.S.); University of Cambridge; Cornell University (Ph.D.)
- Scientific career
- Fields: Physics
- Workplaces: Bell Labs; Brookhaven National Laboratory; Princeton University; University of Chicago; University of Wisconsin–Madison; University of New South Wales
- Thesis: Dynamics of an Incommensurate Harmonic Chain (1983)
- Doctoral advisors: N. David Mermin, Daniel S. Fisher

Susan Nan Coppersmith (born March 18, 1957) is an American condensed matter physicist. Formerly the Robert E. Fassnacht Professor of Physics and Vilas Research Professor in the Department of Physics at the University of Wisconsin–Madison, she moved in 2018 to the University of New South Wales.

== Education and career ==
Coppersmith was born on March 18, 1957, in Johnstown, Pennsylvania; her parents were a lawyer and a piano teacher.

She majored in physics at the Massachusetts Institute of Technology, graduating in 1978. After a year of study as a Churchill Scholar in applied mathematics at the University of Cambridge, she went to Cornell University for additional graduate study, completing a doctorate in physics there in 1983. Her dissertation, Dynamics of an Incommensurate Harmonic Chain, connected the theory of dynamical systems to condensed matter physics, and was supervised by Daniel S. Fisher. Fisher was at Bell Labs at the time, and Coppersmith herself did most of her doctoral research at Bell Labs, so the official chair of her doctoral committee was instead N. David Mermin.

After postdoctoral research at Brookhaven National Laboratory, Bell Labs, and Princeton University, she joined the staff at Bell Labs in 1987. She moved to the University of Chicago in 1995, to the University of Wisconsin-Madison in 2001, and to the University of New South Wales in 2018.

== Research ==
Coppersmith's research has included such varied topics as the way seashells stack together on the beach, the folding patterns of thin gold sheets, the crystalline structure in layers of mother of pearl, the propagation of forces within granular materials, the relation between the atomic structure of materials and their bulk strength, and the design of nano-scale devices for quantum computing.

In relation to quantum computers, Coppersmith is a part of teams that are working to use these to address fundamental problems in high energy physics, this includes improving the discovery potential of direct dark matter experiments and studying the entanglement of neutrinos emitted in core-collapse supernova explosions.

== Recognition ==
Coppersmith was elected as a Fellow of the American Physical Society in 1992, and as a Fellow of the American Association for the Advancement of Science in 1999. In 2006 she was elected to the American Academy of Arts and Sciences, and in 2009 she was elected to the National Academy of Sciences. In 2021 she was elected Fellow of the Australian Academy of Science and Fellow of the Royal Society of New South Wales. Coppersmith won the NSW Premier's Prize for Excellence in Mathematics, Earth Sciences, Chemistry or Physics in 2024, and the Australian Institute of Physics Women in Physics medal in 2024.
