= Leo Burt =

American fugitive

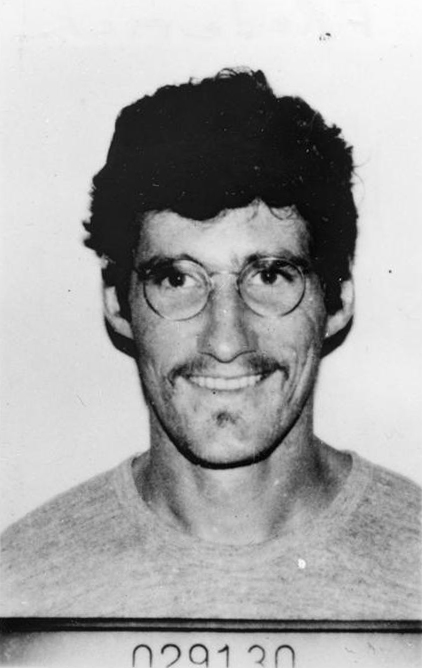
- Burt in 1969

FBI Ten Most Wanted Fugitive
- Charges: Sabotage, destruction of government property, and conspiracy
- Alias: Eugene Donald Fieldston

Description
- Born: Leo Frederick Burt; April 18, 1948 (age 78); Darby, Pennsylvania, U.S.

Status
- Added: September 4, 1970
- Removed: April 7, 1976
- Number: 313
- Removed from Top Ten Fugitive List

Leo Frederick Burt (born April 18, 1948) is an American man indicted in connection with the August 24, 1970 Sterling Hall bombing at the University of Wisconsin–Madison campus, a protest against the Vietnam War. The bombing killed physics researcher Robert Fassnacht and injured several others. Burt was reportedly involved in making and planting the bomb. He has been a fugitive from justice since 1970 and his status and whereabouts are unknown.

== Early life and education ==
Born in Darby, Pennsylvania, Burt grew up in a Catholic family in Havertown, Pennsylvania. He attended St. Denis Parochial School and Monsignor Bonner High School, an all-boys school, where he was an athlete. He enrolled at the University of Wisconsin–Madison, where he was involved in varsity crew. After being cut from the team, he became more active in journalism and student politics, working at the campus newspaper, The Daily Cardinal, with future fellow bomber David Fine.

Burt became radicalized after being beaten by a policeman while covering a protest against the Kent State shootings.

== Sterling Hall bombing ==
The bombing of Sterling Hall on the campus of the University of Wisconsin on August 24, 1970, killed Robert Fassnacht, a postdoctoral physics researcher, and injured three others. It also caused $2.1 million in damage. Burt was reportedly involved in making and planting the bomb and also introduced his fellow bombers David Fine and Karl Armstrong to one another in July 1970.

== Life as fugitive and indictment ==
Burt and his associates fled to Canada where they were tracked by the FBI. One of the last times he was heard from was August 30, 1970, when he and David Fine escaped from their apartment building in Peterborough, Ontario, Canada, as the police closed in on them. Burt left behind a wallet with a fake ID using an alias of Eugene Donald Fieldston. Burt was indicted by the federal government on September 2, 1970, for sabotage, destruction of government property, and conspiracy. Despite having been on the FBI Ten Most Wanted Fugitives list for six years (September 4, 1970, to April 7, 1976), Burt has not been captured and is still at large, with an FBI reward of $150,000 outstanding for information leading to his arrest. In addition to the federal charges, there are state charges still pending against Burt.

In 2010, near the fortieth anniversary of the bombing, several tips on Burt's possible location were received by the FBI, including a sighting at a Denver homeless shelter. Some have speculated that he could be in the St. Catharines area of Ontario, an area he had visited during summers in his youth.

== In media ==
The 1979 documentary film The War at Home focused on the anti-war movement in Madison, including the Sterling Hall bombing.

On September 29, 2007, Burt was featured on the Fox television series America's Most Wanted as the "Ghost of Wisconsin".

An episode of the Travel Channel's Mysteries at the Museum, first aired on May 29, 2012, examined the Sterling Hall bombing and highlighted that Burt remained at large.

== See also ==
- List of fugitives from justice who disappeared
