= Dwight Armstrong =

American anti-Vietnam War activist

Dwight Alan Armstrong
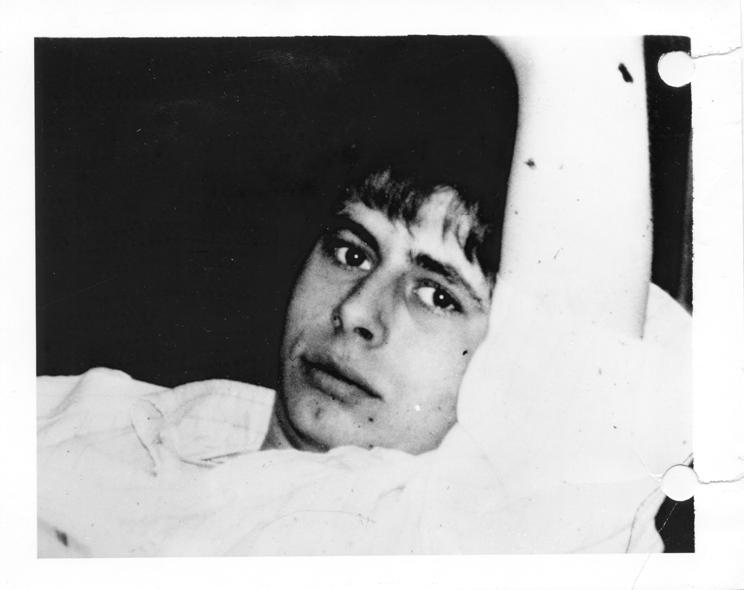

FBI Ten Most Wanted Fugitive

Description
- Born: August 29, 1951; Madison, Wisconsin
- Died: June 20, 2010 (aged 58); University of Wisconsin Hospital and Clinics in Madison, Wisconsin
- Cause of death: Lung cancer
- Gender: Male

Status
- Convictions: Second degree murder
- Penalty: Seven years to life
- Added: Sept 4, 1970
- Caught: April 1977
- Number: 310
- Captured

Dwight Alan Armstrong (August 29, 1951 – June 20, 2010) was an American anti-Vietnam War activist who helped use a truck bomb to shatter Sterling Hall, a centrally located building on the University of Wisconsin–Madison campus, on August 24, 1970. Armstrong and three others targeted an army mathematical research center on an upper floor. They considered the university complicit in military research that enabled aggression. The bomb gutted the building, killing one person and injuring three. Armstrong spent several years on the run before being imprisoned for his role in "a political protest that, gone violently wrong, endures in the national memory as an act of domestic terrorism".

== Early life and education ==
Armstrong was born on August 29, 1951, in Madison, Wisconsin. He grew up there as "an ordinary Midwestern boy, fond of playing baseball and bicycling around his exurban community". He dropped out of high school in 10th grade and by 1970 he had joined his brother Karl in actively opposing the American war in Vietnam. In a previous action on New Year's Eve 1969, Dwight and Karl stole a light plane and dropped homemade bombs that failed to explode on an area ordnance factory.

== Sterling Hall bombing ==
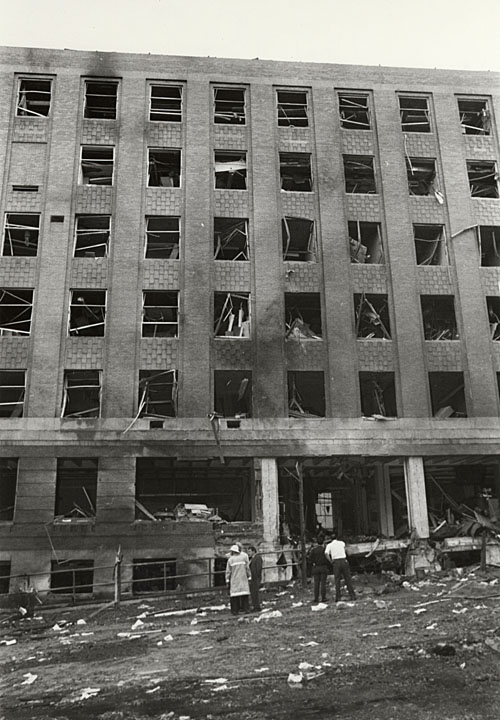
The aftermath of the Sterling Hall bombing

In response to the Kent State shootings on May 4, 1970, in which four protesters were shot and killed by the Ohio National Guard, they conceived of an attack on the Army Mathematics Research Center at the University of Wisconsin, which had been a frequent site of anti-War protests. Karl made a bomb out of dynamite, 100 US gallons (380 L; 83 imp gal) of fuel oil and 1,700 pounds (770 kg) of ammonium nitrate fertilizer.The bomb was placed in a stolen van left next to Sterling Hall, a building that housed the Army Mathematics Research Center, as well as the university's physics department. They lit the fuse after checking the windows of Sterling Hall and seeing no activity, assuming that the building was empty. A bomb threat was phoned in to the Madison Police Department, saying "Hey, pig, ... there's a bomb in the math research center", giving five minutes notice of the planned detonation. Though previous such calls had turned out to be pranks, a police cruiser was dispatched to the site minutes before the explosion. The bomb detonated at 3:42 a.m. on August 24, 1970, killing Robert Fassnacht, a physics post-doctoral researcher who was working late in the building's basement, injuring three others, and causing as much as $8 million in damage to the building (equivalent to $66.3 million in 2025).

Dwight Armstrong drove away with his brother, Leo Burt and David Fine to a truck stop where they celebrated the bombing. When they heard a news report on their car radio that someone had been killed by the explosion, all four went on the run, with Armstrong's seven years at large the longest of the four people suspected in the bombing aside from Leo Burt, who was still at large as of 2025. On September 4, the Federal Bureau of Investigation began a search for the four fugitives, placing them on the FBI Ten Most Wanted Fugitives list. Armstrong remained underground until he was arrested in April 1977 in Toronto; he had been arrested three times before, but each time police never learned his true identity. He pleaded no contest to state murder charges and federal conspiracy charges. As part of his plea bargain, he was sentenced concurrently to seven years each in state and federal prison and was released on parole in 1980 on the condition that he participate in a community rehabilitation program.

He was arrested again in 1987 in Indiana where he was charged with operating a meth lab run out of a warehouse. He was sentenced to 10 years in prison and was released in 1991. He came back to Madison, where he tended to his mother and worked driving a taxi. In 2001, he purchased the Radical Rye Deli with Karl.

== Death and legacy ==
In a 1992 interview with The Capital Times of Madison, he stated that "My life has not been something to write home about". He justified the bombing, stating that "We did what we had to do; we did what we felt a lot of other people should have done", continuing that "I don't care what public opinion is; we did what was right."

Armstrong died of lung cancer at age 58 on June 20, 2010, at the University of Wisconsin Hospital and Clinics in Madison, Wisconsin. He was survived by his mother, his brother, two sisters and a daughter.
