= Robert Fassnacht =

American physicist

- Born: January 14, 1937; South Bend, Indiana, U.S.
- Died: August 24, 1970 (aged 33); Madison, Wisconsin, U.S.
- Cause of death: Bomb explosion
- Education: Kalamazoo College; University of Wisconsin–Madison
- Occupation: Physics researcher
- Spouse: Stephanie Fassnacht
- Children: 3

Robert E. Fassnacht (January 14, 1937 – August 24, 1970) was an American physics post-doctoral researcher who was killed by the August 1970 bombing of Sterling Hall on the University of Wisconsin–Madison campus, perpetrated as a protest against the Vietnam War.

Fassnacht was a student from South Bend, Indiana, who received a Westinghouse scholarship to attend college. He was at the University of Wisconsin–Madison pursuing post-doctoral research in the field of superconductivity.

== Bombing ==
On the night of August 23 and into the early morning hours of August 24, 1970, Fassnacht was in the lab taking care of unfinished work because he and his family were slated to leave for a vacation in San Diego, California. His lab was located in the basement of Sterling Hall. He was in the process of cooling down his dewar with liquid nitrogen when the explosion occurred. Rescuers found him face down in about a foot of water. The cause of death, determined from the autopsy, was internal trauma.

As a protest against the Vietnam War, the bomb was built and planted by Karleton "Karl" Armstrong, Dwight Armstrong, David Fine, and allegedly Leo Burt. The intention was to destroy the Army Mathematics Research Center, but instead destroyed much of the physics department and severely damaged neighboring buildings.

== After the bombing ==
=== Family ===
Fassnacht was survived by his wife, Stephanie, and their three children: a three-year-old son, and twin daughters who turned one a month after their father's death. The family continued to live in Madison in relative quiet and anonymity for many decades after the explosion, often crossing paths with the site of their father/husband's murder.

Stephanie Fassnacht completed a long career at the University of Wisconsin–Madison, occupying an office just blocks from the site of her husband's death. She stated that she harbored "no ill will" toward Karl Armstrong "and never did." Instead she held the Board of Regents responsible.

=== Commemorative plaque ===
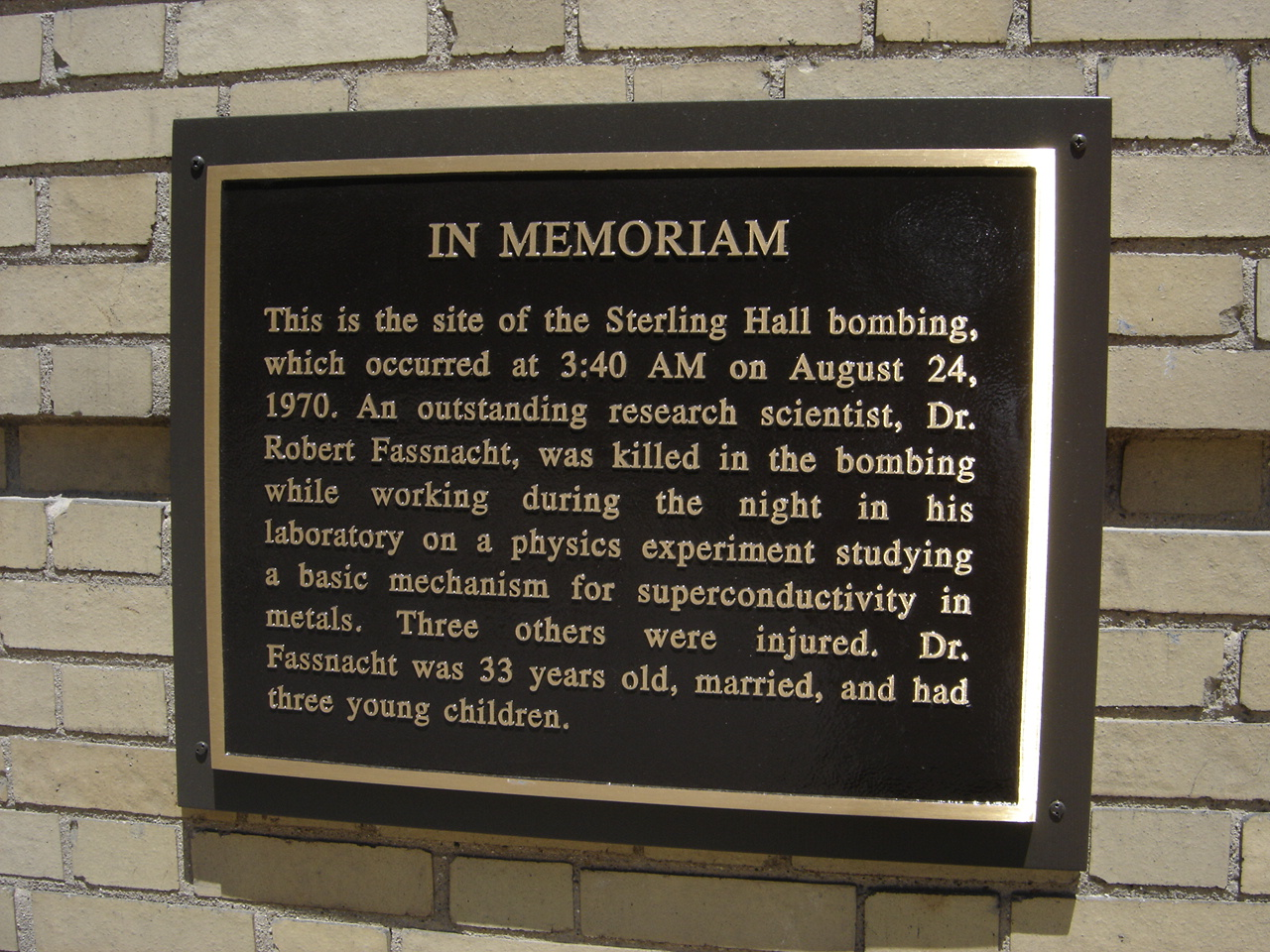
Plaque on the south side of Sterling Hall. Dedicated on May 18, 2007.

On May 18, 2007, the University of Wisconsin–Madison unveiled a plaque on the side of Sterling Hall commemorating the bombing and Robert Fassnacht's death. The event was attended by John D. Wiley, then Chancellor of the University of Wisconsin–Madison and an acquaintance of Robert Fassnacht, by current and former members of the Physics department, including chair Susan Coppersmith, and family and friends of Robert, including his daughters Heidi and Karin.

The plaque reads:

IN MEMORIAM

This is the site of the Sterling Hall Bombing, which occurred at 3:40 AM on August 24, 1970. An outstanding research scientist, Dr. Robert Fassnacht, was killed in the bombing while working in his laboratory on a physics experiment studying a basic mechanism for superconductivity in metals. Three others were injured. Dr. Fassnacht was 33 years old, married, and had three young children.

== Bibliography ==
- Fassnacht, R. E.; Dillinger, J. R. (August 1, 1967). "Superconductivity of Cd–Bi Eutectic Solder". Journal of Applied Physics. 38 (9): 3667–3668. Bibcode:1967JAP....38.3667F. doi:10.1063/1.1710191. ISSN 0021-8979.
- Fassnacht, R. E.; Dillinger, J. R. (August 8, 1967). "Time Mark Generator for an X-Y Recorder". Review of Scientific Instruments. 39 (1): 127. doi:10.1063/1.1683090. ISSN 0034-6748.
- Fassnacht, R. E.; Dillinger, J. R. (December 10, 1967). "Superconducting Transitions of Isotopes of Zinc". Physical Review. 164 (2): 565–574. Bibcode:1967PhRv..164..565F. doi:10.1103/PhysRev.164.565.
- Dillinger, J. R.; Fassnacht, R. E.; Jones, D. M. (October 31, 1968). "Isotope Effect in Zinc and Zirconium". 10th International Conference on Low Temperature Physics. OSTI 4507358.
- Fassnacht, R. E.; Dillinger, J. R. (March 10, 1969). "Isotope Effect in Superconducting Gallium". Physics Letters A. 28 (11): 741–742. Bibcode:1969PhLA...28..741F. doi:10.1016/0375-9601(69)90595-7. ISSN 0375-9601.
- Fassnacht, R. E.; Dillinger, J R. (May 11, 1970). "Evidence for Fluctuation Effects above T_{C} in Isotopically and Metallurgically Pure Bulk Type-I Superconductors". Physical Review Letters. 24 (19): 1059–1061. Bibcode:1970PhRvL..24.1059F. doi:10.1103/PhysRevLett.24.1059.
- Fassnacht, R. E.; Dillinger, J. R. (December 1, 1970). "Isotope Effect in Superconducting Cadmium". Physical Review B. 2 (11): 4442–4444. Bibcode:1970PhRvB...2.4442F. doi:10.1103/PhysRevB.2.4442.

== Books and Resources ==
- Rads: The 1970 Bombing of the Army Math Research Center at the University of Wisconsin–Madison and Its Aftermath, 1992, by Tom Bates (ISBN 0060167548)
- The Madison Bombings, 1988, by Michael Morris (ISBN 0947002308)
- Madison Newspapers Archive of the Sterling Hall Bombing
- Dillinger, Joseph R. (December 30, 2008). "Robert E. Fassnacht". Physics Today. 23 (10): 69. doi:10.1063/1.3021801. ISSN 0031-9228.
- "STERLING HALL/MATH RESEARCH CENTER BOMBING FINDING AID" (PDF). UW Archives. February 12, 2016. Archived (PDF) from the original on July 14, 2020. "The bombing of Sterling Hall on the morning of August 24, 1970 was one of the pivotal events of the protest movements of the 1960s and 70s, as well as in the history of the University of Wisconsin's Madison campus. [...] this research guide has been compiled with the aim of aiding those inquiring into the bombing."
- Reeves, Troy (ed.). "Sterling Hall Bombing of 1970 | Oral History Website". University of Wisconsin-Madison.
- Crandell, Marlene, ed. (2009) [1957]. The Kalamazoo College Boiling Pot (PDF). Kalamazoo, Michigan: Kalamazoo College Archives. pp. 32, 33, 66, 67.
- "91st Congress, 2nd Session - SENATE; ILLEGAL TRANSPORTATION, USE, OR POSSESSION OF EXPLOSIVES" (PDF). Congressional Record. 116, Part 26 (October 1, 1970 to October 8, 1970): 35630. October 8, 1970. "Senator McClellan: Robert Fassnacht lost his life at the University of Wisconsin in Madison when a terrorist bomb, aimed at [the] Army-funded mathematics center on the second and fourth floors of the building, demolished the physics lab below. Lost, too, was the life's work of Prof. Joseph R. Dillinger, who has spent the last 23 years constructing, step by painful step, an intricate assemblage of cryogenic machinery, which was totally wiped out by the blast. Faced with this destruction of his own life's work, Dillinger, according to Life magazine-September 18, 1970, at page 41, column 3-is bewildered and bitter. "Fassnacht is dead and nothing can bring him back," he says. "That's the biggest loss of all. As for my lab, I could rebuild it all for about $150,000 (equivalent to $1,244,000 in 2025). It would take me about 6 years, but I could do it. But by then I'd be 60. And suppose they blew it up again? What's the point?""
