= David Fine (activist) =

American activist

David Sylvan Fine
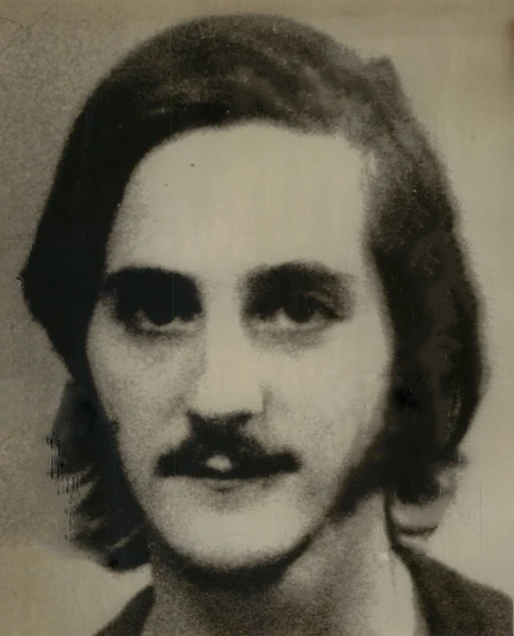
- Fine in 1975
- Born: March 18, 1952 (age 74); Wilmington, Delaware, US
- Other name: William Lewes
- Education: University of Delaware (B.A.), University of Oregon (J.D.)
- Occupation: Paralegal
- Status: Paroled after three years
- Convictions: Conspiracy, Unlawful flight to avoid prosecution, Third-degree murder (June 1976)
- Penalty: Conspiracy, Unlawful flight: seven years. Murder: seven years. All served concurrently.

David Sylvan Fine (born March 18, 1952) is an American anti-Vietnam War radical who was one of four perpetrators of the August 24, 1970, Sterling Hall bombing on the campus University of Wisconsin–Madison, in an act of political protest to the University's research efforts on behalf of the U.S. military. The bomb destroyed the building, killing one person and injuring three others. Fine spent five and a half years as a fugitive after the incident.

== Early life and education ==
Fine was born in Wilmington, Delaware, the second of two children in middle-class family. He attended the Wilmington Friends School, a private Quaker-run school. He enrolled at the University of Wisconsin-Madison beginning in the fall of 1969 on a full academic scholarship. At the university, he was reporter and editor for the student newspaper, The Daily Cardinal, and earned a 3.75 grade point index in his freshman year—the only year he was in attendance.

== Sterling Hall bombing ==
In response to the Kent State shootings on May 4, 1970, in which four protesters were shot and killed by the Ohio National Guard, Fine, along with brothers Karleton and Dwight Armstrong and Leo Burt conceived of an attack on the Army Mathematics Research Center at the University of Wisconsin, which had been a frequent site of antiwar protests. At age 18, Fine was the youngest of the four. Karleton made a bomb out of dynamite, 100 US gallons (380 L; 83 imp gal) of fuel oil and 1,700 pounds (770 kg) of ammonium nitrate fertilizer.

The bomb was placed in a stolen van left next to Sterling Hall, a building that housed the Army Mathematics Research Center, as well as the university's physics department. The bombers claim to have lit the fuse after checking the windows of Sterling Hall and seeing no activity, assuming that the building was empty. The bomb detonated at 3:42 AM on August 24, 1970, killing Robert Fassnacht, a physics post-doctoral researcher who was working late, injuring three others, and causing millions of dollars in damage to the building.

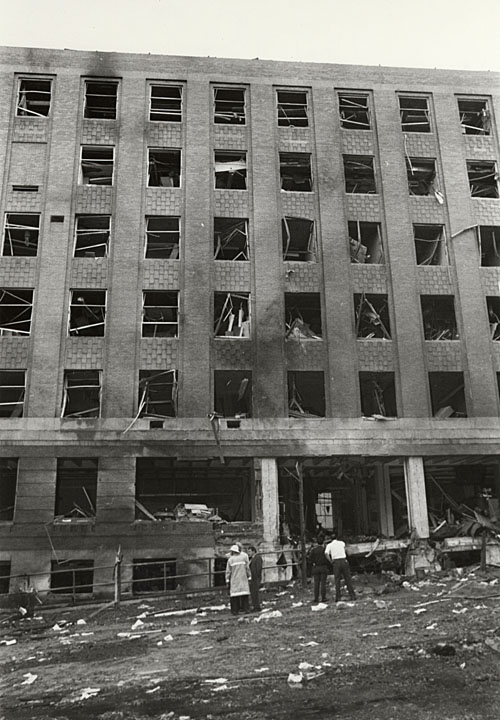
The aftermath of the Sterling Hall bombing.

When they heard a news report on their car radio that someone had been killed by the explosion, all four went on the run and were placed on the FBI's Most Wanted List.

== Life as fugitive, capture, trial and imprisonment ==
Fine was eventually captured in San Rafael, California on January 7, 1976. After the arrest, his former University of Wisconsin roommate Rod Beaton formed a fundraising committee to assist with the legal defense for Fine.

On June 8, 1976, Fine pleaded guilty to two felonies in federal district court: conspiracy and unlawful flight to avoid prosecution. On the same day, he also pleaded guilty in Dane County Wisconsin Circuit Court to charges of destruction of property and to murder in the third degree for causing the death of Robert Fassnacht.

He was sentenced to a total of seven years in prison on the federal charges and received a sentence in the state court of seven years; the two sentences were to run concurrently. Fine was paroled on August 15, 1979, and remained on parole for approximately three additional years.

== Later life ==
After his release, he earned a college degree at the University of Delaware and a J.D. degree at the University of Oregon. In 1984, after passing the Oregon Bar exam, Fine was denied admission to the Bar on the grounds that "he had failed to show good moral character." Fine appealed the decision to the Supreme Court of Oregon which upheld the decision. In the court's decision it was written:

He has not shown himself to be a credible person and did not establish that he now has the good moral character required to practice law. We base our decision on applicant's present statements about his past acts. We recognize that persons can and do reform. However, in this case applicant's deceitful, self-serving conduct persisted at the time of the hearing (appealing his denial of admission).

As of October 2014, Fine is married and works as a law clerk at Chernoff Vilhauer LLP in Portland, Oregon.
