= Sterling Hall bombing =

US domestic terror attack

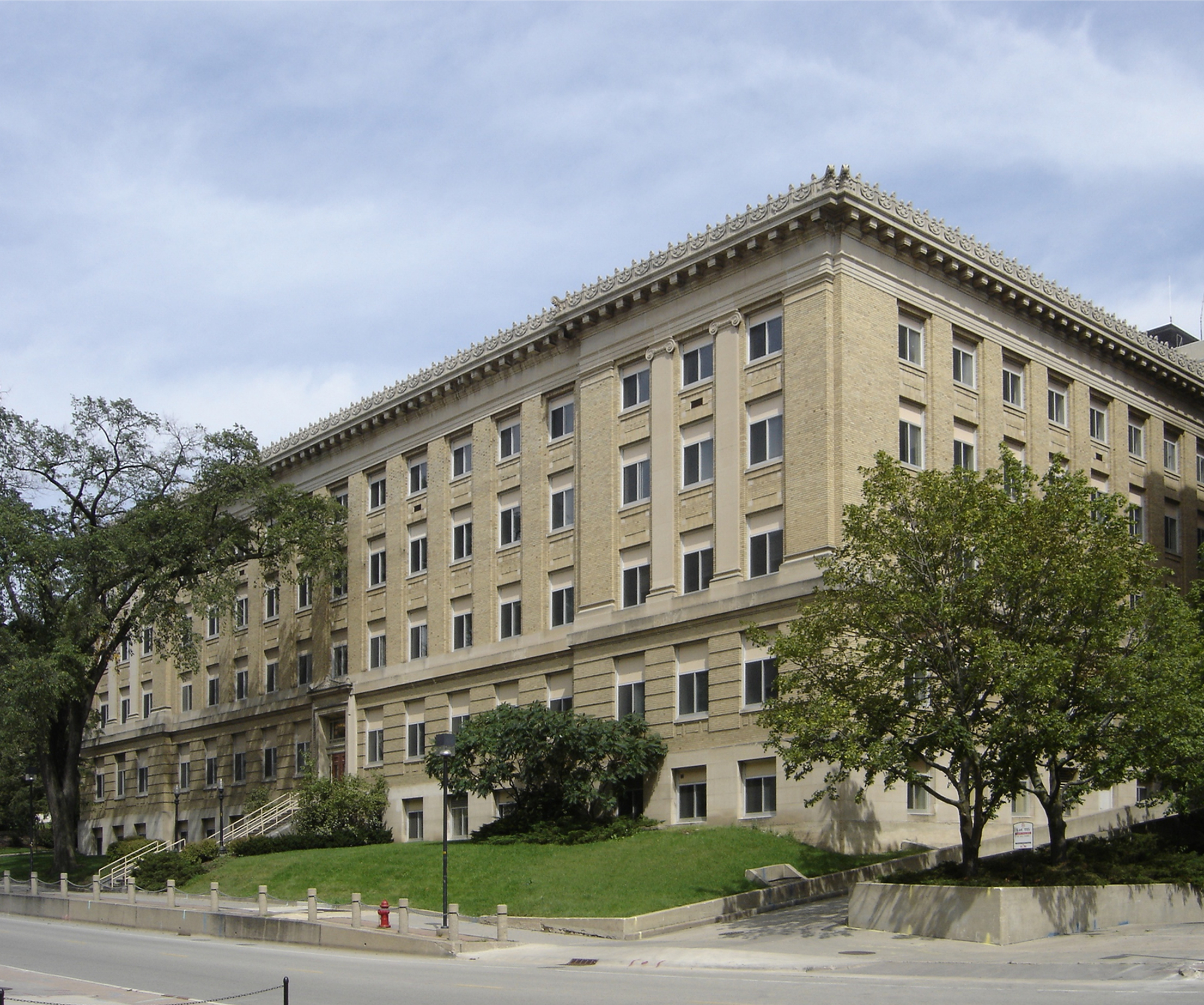
- Sterling Hall
- Location: 43.074278°N 89.405408°W; Madison, Wisconsin, United States
- Date: August 24, 1970; 3:42 am (UTC-5)
- Target: Army Mathematics Research Center, Sterling Hall, UW–Madison
- Attack type: Car bombing of a school building
- Weapon: Car bomb (ammonium nitrate)
- Deaths: 1
- Injuries: 3
- Perpetrators: Karleton Armstrong, Dwight Armstrong, David Fine and allegedly Leo Burt
- Motive: Opposition to U.S. involvement in Vietnam

The Sterling Hall bombing occurred on the University of Wisconsin–Madison campus on August 24, 1970, and was committed by four men as an action against the university's research connections with the U.S. military during the Vietnam War. It resulted in the death of a university physics researcher and injuries to three others.

== Overview ==
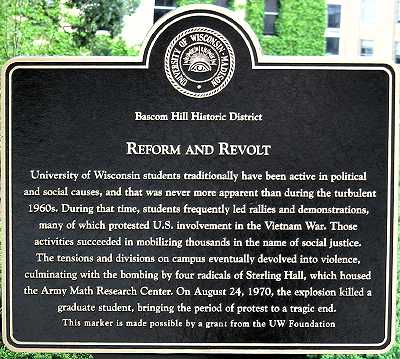
Sterling Hall historical marker

Sterling Hall is a centrally located building on the University of Wisconsin–Madison campus. The bomb, set off at 3:42 am on August 24, 1970, was intended to destroy the Army Mathematics Research Center (AMRC) housed on the 2nd, 3rd, and 4th floors of the building. It caused massive destruction to other parts of the building and nearby buildings as well. It resulted in the death of the researcher Robert Fassnacht, injured three others and caused significant destruction to the physics department and its equipment. Neither Fassnacht nor the physics department itself was involved with or employed by the Army Mathematics Research Center.

The bombers used a Ford Econoline van stolen from a University of Wisconsin professor of computer sciences. It was filled with close to 2,000 pounds (910 kg) of ANFO (i.e., ammonium nitrate and fuel oil). Pieces of the van were found on top of an eight-story building three blocks away and 26 nearby buildings were damaged; however, the targeted AMRC was scarcely damaged. Total damage to University of Wisconsin–Madison property was over $2.1 million ($16.2 million in 2025) as a result of the bombing.

== Army Mathematics Research Center ==
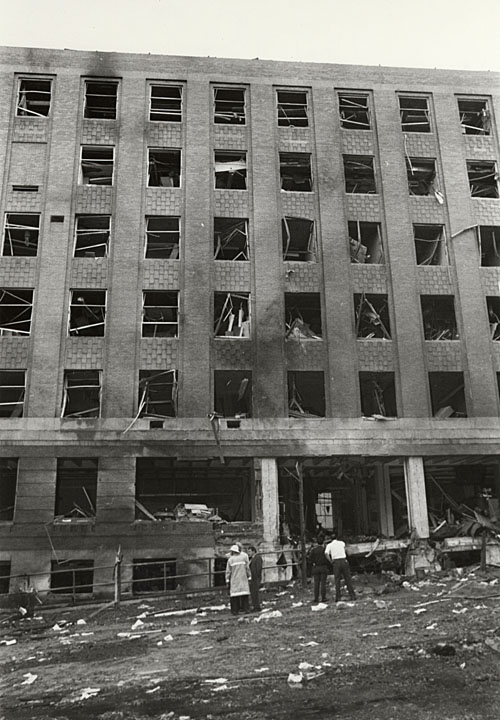
Sterling Hall after the bombing

During the Vietnam War, the 2nd, 3rd and 4th floors of the southern (east-west) wing of Sterling Hall housed the Army Mathematics Research Center (AMRC). This was an Army-funded think tank, directed by J. Barkley Rosser, Sr.

At the time of the bombing, the staff at the center consisted of about 45 mathematicians, about 30 of them full-time. Rosser was well known for his research in pure mathematics, logic (Rosser's trick, the Kleene–Rosser paradox, and the Church–Rosser theorem) and in number theory (Rosser sieve). Rosser had been the head of the U.S. ballistics program during World War II and also had contributed to research on several missiles used by the U.S. military.

The money to build a home for AMRC came from the Wisconsin Alumni Research Foundation (WARF) in 1955. Their money built a 6-floor addition to Sterling Hall. In the contract to work at the facility, it was required that mathematicians spend at least half their time on U.S. Army research.

Rosser publicly minimized any military role of the center and implied that AMRC pursued mathematics, including both pure and applied mathematics. The University of Wisconsin student newspaper, The Daily Cardinal, obtained and published quarterly reports that AMRC submitted to the Army. The Cardinal published a series of investigative articles making a convincing case that AMRC was pursuing research that was directly pursuant to specific United States Department of Defense requests, and relevant to counterinsurgency operations in Vietnam. AMRC became a magnet for demonstrations, in which protesters chanted "U.S. out of Vietnam! Smash Army Math!"

The Army Mathematics Research Center was phased out by the Department of Defense at the end of the 1970 fiscal year.

== Bombers and suspected bomber ==
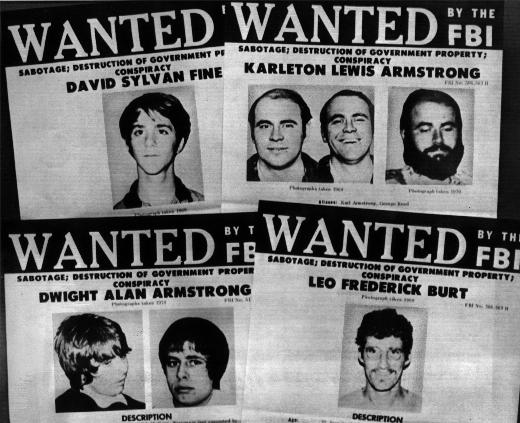
FBI wanted posters published shortly after the bombing

The bombers were Karleton Armstrong, Dwight Armstrong, David Fine, and allegedly Leo Burt. They called themselves the "New Year's Gang", a name which was derived from an exploit on New Year's Eve 1969. In that earlier attack, Dwight and Karl, with Karl's girlfriend, Lynn Schultz (who drove the getaway car), stole a small plane from Morey Field in Middleton. Dwight and Karl dropped homemade explosives on the Badger Army Ammunition Plant, but the explosives failed to detonate. They successfully landed the plane at another airport and escaped.

=== Karleton "Karl" Armstrong ===
I still feel we can't rationalize someone getting killed, but at that time we felt we should never have done the bombing at all. Now I don't feel that way. I feel it was justified and should have been done. It just should have been done more responsibly.
—Karleton Armstrong, in a 1986 interview

Karl was the oldest of the bombers. He had been admitted to the University of Wisconsin–Madison in 1964, but left in 1965, working odd jobs for the next couple of years. He was re-accepted into the university in the fall of 1967. Karl witnessed violent confrontations between protesters and police on October 18, 1967 when Dow Chemical Company held job interviews on campus, which many students protested by blocking the building where interviews were being held.

Before the Sterling Hall bombing, Karl had committed other acts of anti-war violence, including setting fire to an ROTC installation at the University of Wisconsin Armory (the Red Gym), and bombing what he thought was the State's Selective Service headquarters, but turned out to be the University of Wisconsin Primate Research Center. Karl also attempted to plant explosives at a Prairie du Sac electrical substation that supplied power to the Badger Ammunition Plant, but was frightened off by the night watchman.

After the bombing, Karl went into hiding for 18 months until his capture in Toronto on February 16, 1972. He was sentenced to 23 years in prison, but served only seven. After his release, Armstrong returned to Madison, where he operated a juice cart called Loose Juice on the library mall. In the early 2000s, he opened a deli called Radical Rye on State Street near the UW–Madison campus, which he operated until it was displaced by the development of the Overture Center for the Arts.

=== Dwight Armstrong ===
Dwight Armstrong, Karl's younger brother, was 19 at the time of the bombing. After the bombing, he lived in a commune in Toronto under the name "Virgo". After a few months, he left the commune, traveled first to Vancouver and then on to San Francisco, where he connected with the Symbionese Liberation Army (SLA) which was holding Patty Hearst at the time. It is believed he was not active in the SLA. He returned to Toronto where he was arrested on April 10, 1977. He pleaded guilty to the bombing, was sentenced to seven years in prison, of which he served three before being released.

In 1987, he was arrested, convicted, and sentenced to ten years in prison for conspiring to distribute amphetamines in Indiana. After being released from prison, he returned to Madison and worked for Union Cab until January 2001, when he purchased the Radical Rye Deli with his brother.

Dwight Armstrong died from lung cancer on June 20, 2010, at age 58.

=== David Fine ===
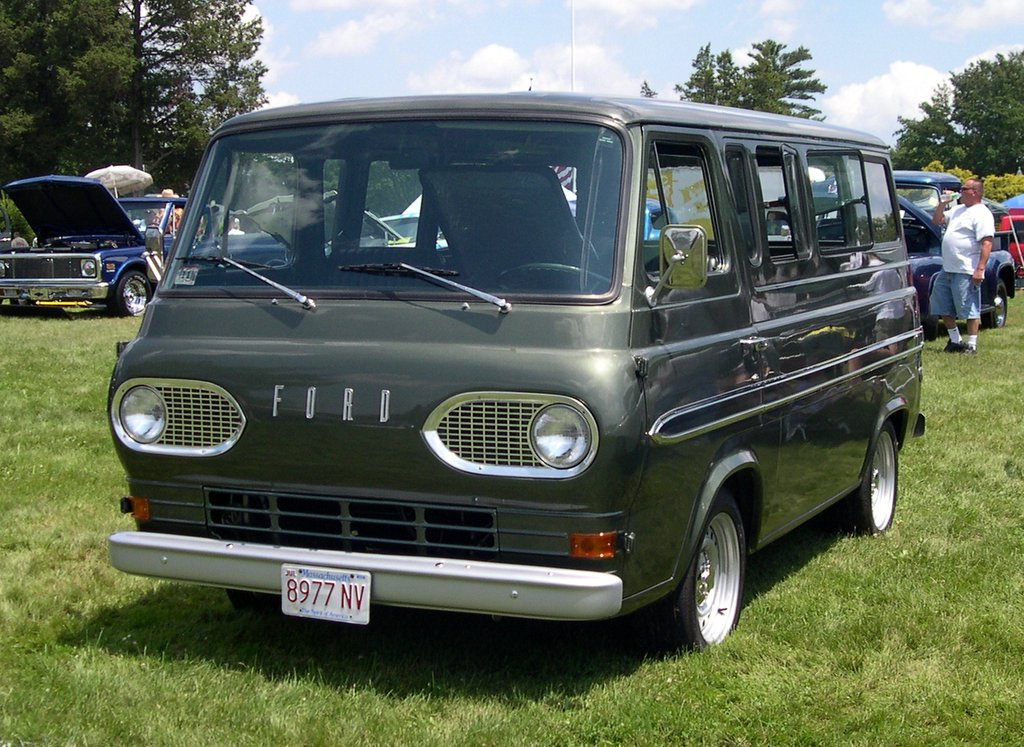
An early 1960s Ford van, similar to the van used in the bombing

Eighteen years old at the time of the bombing, David Fine was the youngest of the four bombers. He came to UW Madison as a freshman in 1969. He wrote for the campus newspaper The Daily Cardinal, and associated with other writers, including Leo Burt. He met Karl Armstrong in the summer of 1970.

On January 7, 1976, he was captured in San Rafael, California, and sentenced to seven years in federal prison for his part in the bombing, of which he served three.

In 1987, after passing the Oregon bar examination, Fine was denied admission to the bar on the grounds that he "had failed to show good moral character". Fine appealed the decision to the Oregon Supreme Court, which upheld the decision.

=== Leo Burt ===
Leo Burt was 22 years old, and worked at the campus newspaper The Daily Cardinal with David Fine. Burt came to Wisconsin following his interest in rowing, and joined the crew. He introduced Fine and Karl Armstrong to each other in July 1970.

After the bombing, Burt fled to Canada with Fine, and as of May 2023, still has not been seen. Over the years, there had been new leads on his possible whereabouts, none of which panned out.

== Victims ==
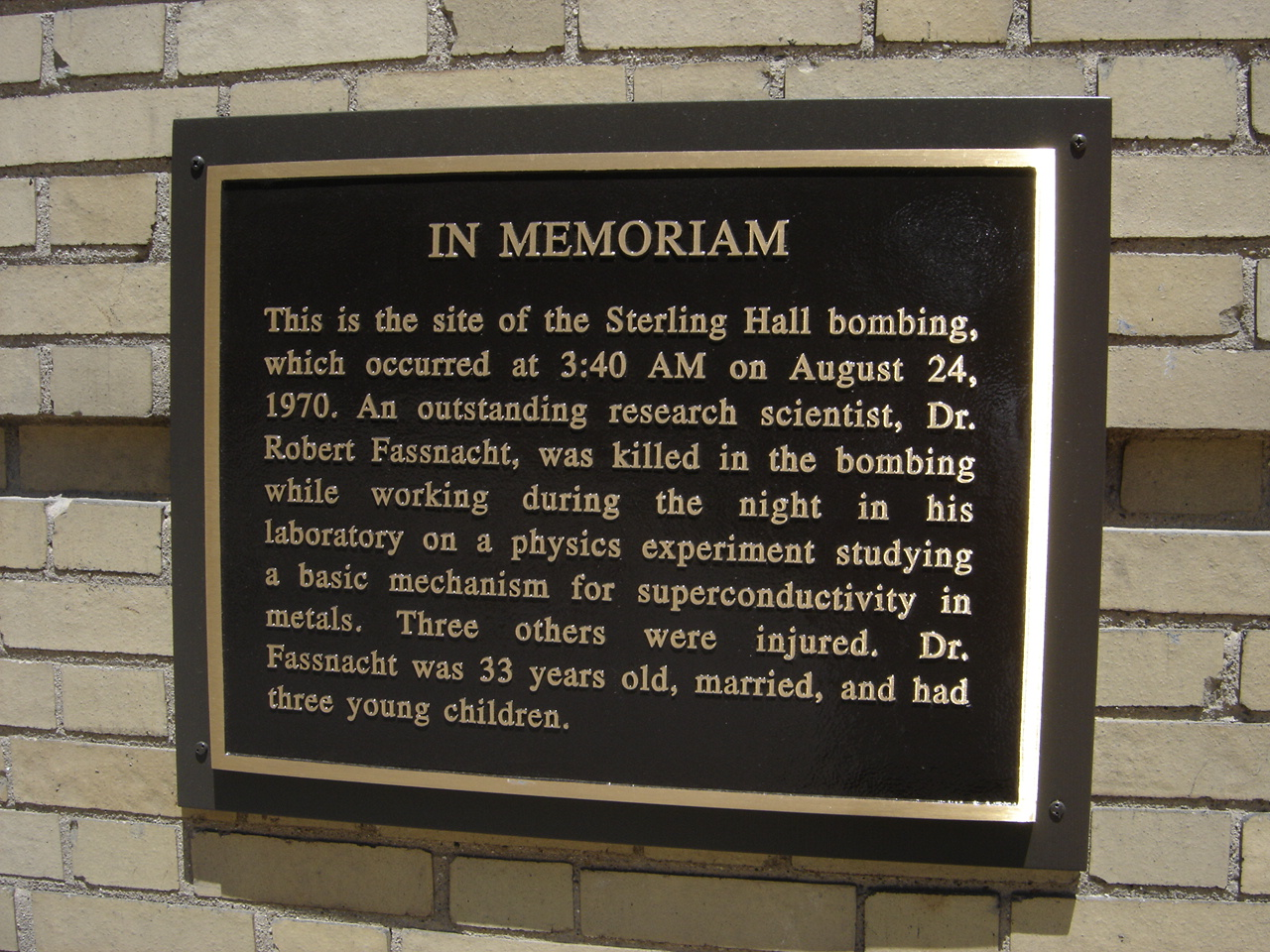
Plaque on the south side of Sterling Hall. Dedicated on May 18, 2007.

Robert Fassnacht was a 33-year-old postdoctoral researcher at the University of Wisconsin–Madison. On the night and early morning of August 23–24, 1970, he went to the laboratory to finish up work before leaving on a family vacation. He was involved in research in the field of superconductivity. At the time of the explosion, Fassnacht was in his laboratory located in the basement level of Sterling Hall. He was monitoring an experiment when the explosion occurred. Rescuers found him face down in about a foot of water.

Injured in the bombing were Paul Quin, David Schuster, and Norbert Sutler. Schuster, a South African graduate student, who became deaf in one ear and with only partial hearing in the other ear, was the most seriously injured of the three, suffering a broken shoulder, fractured ribs and a ruptured eardrum; he was buried in the rubble for three hours before being rescued by firefighters. Quin, a postdoctoral physics researcher, and Sutler, a university security officer, suffered cuts from shattered glass and bruises. Quin, who became a physics professor at UW–Madison, always refused to discuss the bombing in public.

== See also ==
- Greenwich Village townhouse explosion, three members of Weather Underground killed attempting to build a bomb earlier in 1970 in New York City.
- Lists of protests against the Vietnam War#1970
- List of homicides in Wisconsin
- The War at Home (1979 film)
- Running on Empty (1988 film)
