= List of law enforcement officers killed in the line of duty in the United States =

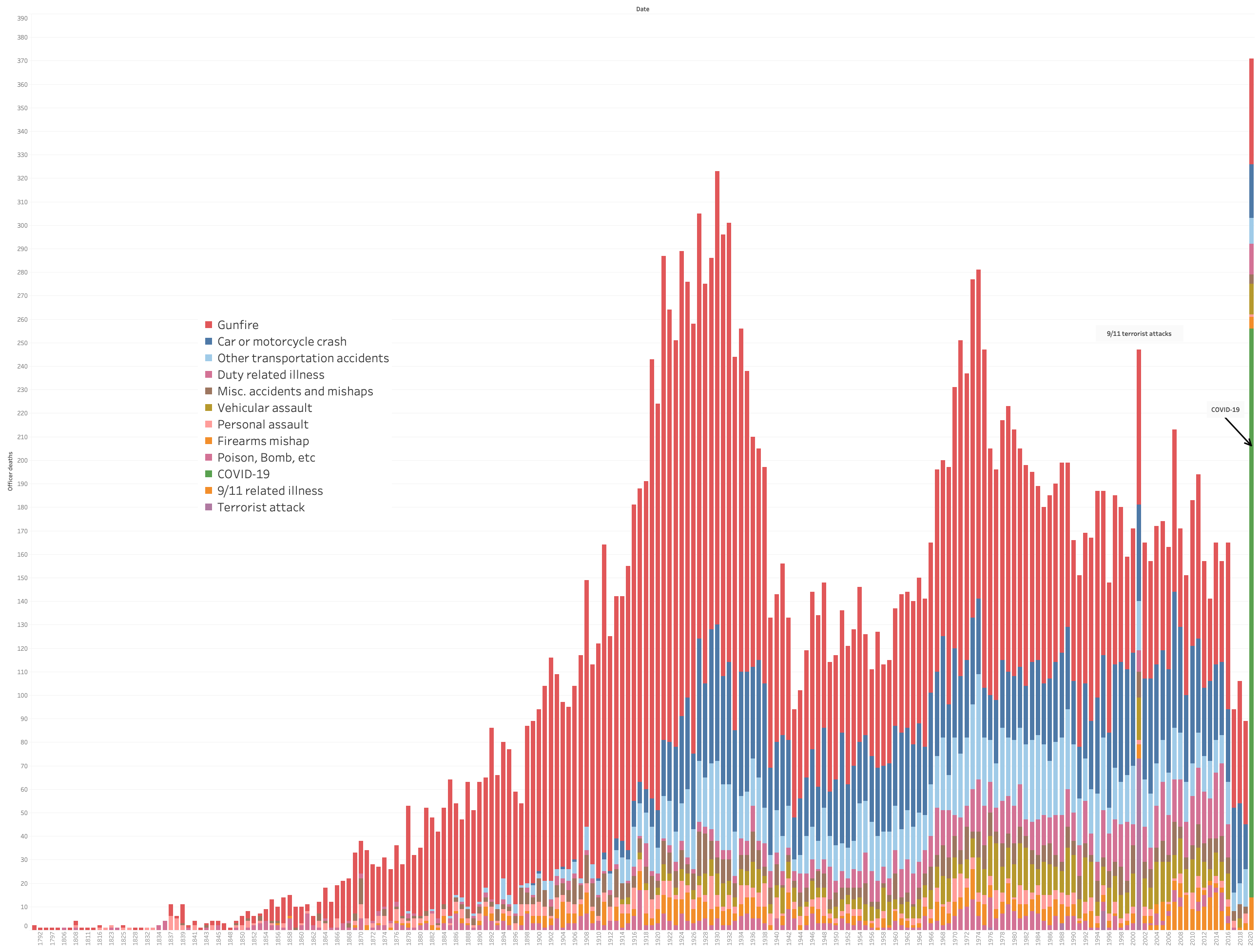
Stacked bar chart of U.S. law enforcement deaths in the line of duty from 1791 through 2020. General cause of death shown by color.

This is a list of U.S. law enforcement officers killed in the line of duty. Summaries of the overall casualty figures, by year, are also provided.

== Overview by year ==
According to the FBI, which publishes the data in the Uniform Crime Reports, from 1980 to 2014, an average of 64 law enforcement officers who were killed in felonious acts per year. Those killed in accidents in the line of duty are not included in that number.

2010
The Officer Down Memorial Page reported 181 deaths in the line of duty. The average from 1990 to 2010 was 164 per year.
2011
The Officer Down Memorial Page reported 191 deaths in the line of duty. The FBI reported that in 2011, "69 law enforcement officers from around the nation were killed in the line of duty, while another 53 officers died in accidents while performing their duties." (released November 19, 2012) NBC News reported 165 dead.
2012
The Officer Down Memorial Page reported 145 deaths in the line of duty. For 2012, the FBI records 49 deaths in the line of duty. The FBI Fund counted 49 federal, state and local officers to have been killed in 2012.
2013
The Officer Down Memorial Page reported 137 deaths in the line of duty. The National Law Enforcement Officers Memorial Fund counted 102 federal, state and local officers to have been killed in 2012. The official count from the FBI is that 27 law enforcement officers were 'feloniously' killed in the line of duty in 2013 (the lowest in a 35-year period 1980–2014), and an additional 49 died in accidents (total: 76).
2014
The Officer Down Memorial Page reported 165 deaths in the line of duty. The National Law Enforcement Officers Memorial Fund counted 126 federal, state, local, tribal and territorial officers killed. The preliminary count from the FBI is that 51 law enforcement officers were 'feloniously' killed in the line of duty in 2014, and an additional 44 died in accidents (total: 95).
2015
The Officer Down Memorial Page reported 168 deaths in the line of duty. The National Law Enforcement Officers Memorial Fund counted 124 federal, state, local, tribal and territorial officers killed. Forty-two officers were shot and killed and 52 officers were killed in traffic-related incidents.
2016
The Officer Down Memorial Page reported 182 deaths in the line of duty. The National Law Enforcement Officers Memorial Fund counted 135 federal, state, local, tribal and territorial officers killed. Sixty-four officers were shot and killed and 21 were ambushed.
2017
The Officer Down Memorial Page reported 190 deaths in the line of duty. The National Law Enforcement Officers Memorial Fund counted 128 federal, state, local, tribal and territorial officers killed. Fatalities decreased more than 10 percent with traffic-related fatalities the leading cause this year. Firearms-related fatalities were the second-leading cause of officer deaths, with 44 officers shot and killed in 2017. This represents a 33 percent decrease from the 66 officers killed in firearm-related incidents during 2016.
2018
The Officer Down Memorial Page reported 192 deaths in the line of duty. The National Law Enforcement Officers Memorial Fund counted 144 federal, state, local, tribal and territorial officers killed. The FBI, however, reported 106 deaths in the line of duty. Firearms-related fatalities were the leading cause of officer deaths for the year.
2019
The Officer Down Memorial Page reported 172 deaths in the line of duty. The leading cause of death for 2019 was gunfire at 49 deaths followed by 9/11-related cancers at 24 deaths. The state with the highest number of line-of-duty deaths was New York with 25 followed by Texas with 18.
2020
The Officer Down Memorial Page reported 461 deaths in the line of duty. The leading cause of death for 2020 was COVID-19 at 281 deaths followed by gunfire at 46 deaths and 9/11-related cancers with 35 deaths. The state with the largest number of line-of-duty deaths was Texas with 78 followed by New York with 43.
2021
The Officer Down Memorial Page reported 725 deaths in the line of duty. The leading cause of death for 2021 was COVID-19 at 454 deaths followed by gunfire at 64 deaths. Fifty-eight officers died in vehicle-related deaths (vehicular homicide, struck by vehicle while on-duty, automobile crash during pursuit). The state with the highest number of line-of-duty deaths was Texas with 107 followed by Florida with 60.
2022
The Officer Down Memorial Page reported 284 deaths in the line of duty. The leading cause of death for 2022 was COVID-19 at 74 deaths followed by gunfire at 60 deaths. The state with the highest number of line-of-duty deaths was Texas with 32.
2023
The Officer Down Memorial Page reported 167 deaths in the line of duty.
2024
The Officer Down Memorial Page reported 167 deaths in the line of duty.
2025
The Officer Down Memorial Page reported 104 deaths in the line of duty, including West Virginia National Guard soldier Sarah Beckstrom, who was participating in the deployment of federal law enforcement and National Guard forces to Washington, D.C. when she was shot on November 26 and died a day later.

== Lists of officers killed ==
This list does not include deaths due to the September 11 attacks, unless the officers were notable people. All law enforcement officers listed here were either notable people, or died as a result of notable events.

=== 1940s and earlier ===
Date	Name	Department	Location	State/territory	Cause of death
January 3, 1791	Darius Quimby	Albany County Constable's Office	Albany County	New York	Stabbing
April 29, 1853	Rodney Badger	Salt Lake County Sheriff's Office	Salt Lake County	Utah	Drowned
April 1, 1878	William J. Brady	Lincoln County Sheriff's Department	Lincoln	New Mexico	Gunfire
October 30, 1880	Fred White	Tombstone Marshal's Office	Tombstone	Arizona	Gunfire (Accidental)
May 4, 1886	Mathias Degan	Chicago Police Department	Chicago	Illinois	Bombing (Haymarket affair)
May 6, 1886	George Muller	Chicago Police Department	Chicago	Illinois	Gunfire (Haymarket affair)
May 6, 1886	John Barrett	Chicago Police Department	Chicago	Illinois	Gunfire (Haymarket affair)
May 8, 1886	Timothy Flavin	Chicago Police Department	Chicago	Illinois	Bombing (Haymarket affair)
May 9, 1886	Michael Sheehan	Chicago Police Department	Chicago	Illinois	Gunfire (Haymarket affair)
May 14, 1886	Nels Hansen	Chicago Police Department	Chicago	Illinois	Bombing (Haymarket affair)
May 16, 1886	Thomas Redden	Chicago Police Department	Chicago	Illinois	Gunfire; bombing (Haymarket affair)
June 13, 1888	Timothy Sullivan	Chicago Police Department	Chicago	Illinois	Gunfire (Haymarket affair; long-term injuries)
October 16, 1890	David Hennessy	New Orleans Police Department	New Orleans	Louisiana	Gunfire
September 1, 1893	Richard Speed	United States Marshals Service	Ingalls	Oklahoma	Gunfire (Battle of Ingalls)
September 2, 1893	Thomas Hueston	United States Marshals Service	Ingalls	Oklahoma	Gunfire (Battle of Ingalls)
September 3, 1893	Lafayette Shadley	United States Marshals Service	Ingalls	Oklahoma	Gunfire (Battle of Ingalls)
April 6, 1902	Bob Wallace	Colbert County Sheriff's Office	Tuscumbia	Alabama	Gunfire (Will Reynolds)
April 6, 1902	Pat Prout	Colbert County Sheriff's Office	Tuscumbia	Alabama	Gunfire (Will Reynolds)
April 6, 1902	James Payne	Colbert County Sheriff's Office	Tuscumbia	Alabama	Gunfire (Will Reynolds)
April 6, 1902	William Gassaway	Colbert County Sheriff's Office	Tuscumbia	Alabama	Gunfire (Will Reynolds)
April 6, 1902	Charles Gassaway	Colbert County Sheriff's Office	Tuscumbia	Alabama	Gunfire (Will Reynolds)
April 6, 1902	Jesse Davis	Colbert County Sheriff's Office	Tuscumbia	Alabama	Gunfire (Will Reynolds)
July 5, 1905	Guy Bradley	Monroe County Sheriff's Office	Flamingo	Florida	Gunfire
November 13, 1906	James Bailey	Asheville Police Department	Asheville	North Carolina	Gunfire (1906 Asheville shooting)
November 13, 1906	Charles Blackstock	Asheville Police Department	Asheville	North Carolina	Gunfire (1906 Asheville shooting)
September 27, 1915	Harry Minto	Oregon Department of Corrections	Marion County	Oregon	Gunfire
July 30, 1916	Joseph Leyden	Lehigh Valley Railroad Police Department	Jersey City	New Jersey	Explosion (Sabotage; Black Tom explosion)
July 30, 1916	James Doherty	Jersey City Police Department	Jersey City	New Jersey	Explosion (Sabotage; Black Tom explosion)
November 5, 1916	Jefferson Beard	Snohomish County Sheriff's Office	Everett	Washington	Gunfire (Everett massacre)
November 5, 1916	Charles Curtiss	Snohomish County Sheriff's Office	Everett	Washington	Gunfire (Everett massacre)
August 6, 1917	Robert H. Holmes	New York City Police Department	New York City	New York	Gunfire
November 24, 1917	Paul Weiler	Milwaukee Police Department	Milwaukee	Wisconsin	Bombing (Milwaukee Police Department bombing)
November 24, 1917	Al Templin	Milwaukee Police Department	Milwaukee	Wisconsin	Bombing (Milwaukee Police Department bombing)
November 24, 1917	Stephen Stecker	Milwaukee Police Department	Milwaukee	Wisconsin	Bombing (Milwaukee Police Department bombing)
November 24, 1917	Edward Spindler	Milwaukee Police Department	Milwaukee	Wisconsin	Bombing (Milwaukee Police Department bombing)
November 24, 1917	Charles Seehawer	Milwaukee Police Department	Milwaukee	Wisconsin	Bombing (Milwaukee Police Department bombing)
November 24, 1917	David O'Brien	Milwaukee Police Department	Milwaukee	Wisconsin	Bombing (Milwaukee Police Department bombing)
November 24, 1917	Fred Kaiser	Milwaukee Police Department	Milwaukee	Wisconsin	Bombing (Milwaukee Police Department bombing)
November 24, 1917	Henry Deckert	Milwaukee Police Department	Milwaukee	Wisconsin	Bombing (Milwaukee Police Department bombing)
November 24, 1917	Frank Caswin	Milwaukee Police Department	Milwaukee	Wisconsin	Bombing (Milwaukee Police Department bombing)
August 28, 1921	George Duling	West Virginia State Police	Logan County	West Virginia	Gunfire (Accidental; Battle of Blair Mountain)
August 31, 1921	George Munzy	Logan County Sheriff's Office	Logan County	West Virginia	Gunfire (Battle of Blair Mountain)
August 31, 1921	John Gore	Logan County Sheriff's Office	Logan County	West Virginia	Gunfire (Battle of Blair Mountain)
August 31, 1921	John Caffago	Logan County Sheriff's Office	Logan County	West Virginia	Gunfire (Battle of Blair Mountain)
December 18, 1922	Charles Linton	Federal Reserve Police	Denver	Colorado	Gunfire (Denver Mint robbery)
July 2, 1931	Harry C. Beasley	Newark Police Department	Newark	Ohio	Gunfire
January 2, 1932	Tony Oliver	Springfield Police Department	Republic	Missouri	Gunfire (Young Brothers massacre)
January 2, 1932	Albert Meadows	Springfield Police Department	Republic	Missouri	Gunfire (Young Brothers massacre)
January 2, 1932	Wiley Marshburn	Greene County Sheriff's Office	Republic	Missouri	Gunfire (Young Brothers massacre)
January 2, 1932	Charles Houser	Springfield Police Department	Republic	Missouri	Gunfire (Young Brothers massacre)
January 2, 1932	Marcell Hendrix	Greene County Sheriff's Office	Republic	Missouri	Gunfire (Young Brothers massacre)
January 2, 1932	Ollie Crosswhite	Greene County Sheriff's Office	Republic	Missouri	Gunfire (Young Brothers massacre)
June 17, 1933	Orin Reed	McAlester Police Department	Kansas City	Missouri	Gunfire (Kansas City massacre)
June 17, 1933	Frank Hermanson	Kansas City Police Department	Kansas City	Missouri	Gunfire (Kansas City massacre)
June 17, 1933	William Grooms	Kansas City Police Department	Kansas City	Missouri	Gunfire (Kansas City massacre)
June 17, 1933	Raymond Caffrey	Federal Bureau of Investigation	Kansas City	Missouri	Gunfire (Kansas City massacre)
August 5, 1933	Fred Beell	Marshfield Police Department	Marshfield	Wisconsin	Gunfire
November 27, 1934	Herman Hollis	Federal Bureau of Investigation	Barrington	Illinois	Gunfire (The Battle of Barrington)
November 28, 1934	Samuel P. Cowley	Federal Bureau of Investigation	Barrington	Illinois	Gunfire (The Battle of Barrington)
April 30, 1936	Oran Pape	Iowa State Patrol	Muscatine County	Iowa	Gunfire
April 19, 1940	Humphrey See	New York Central Railroad Police Department	Little Falls	New York	Train accident (Little Falls Gulf Curve crash of 1940)
January 16, 1947	Frederick Ferdinand Moore	Los Angeles County Sheriff's Department	Los Angeles	California	Gunfire
January 28, 1948	Frank Chaffin	United States Immigration and Naturalization Service	San Benito County	California	Aircraft accident (1948 Los Gatos DC-3 crash)
November 6, 1948	Ellery Purnsley	Chester City Police Department	Chester	Pennsylvania	Gunfire (Market Street Massacre)

=== 1950s ===
Date	Name	Department	Location	State/territory	Cause of death
October 30, 1950	Ramon Villanueva-Moro	Puerto Rico Police Bureau	—N/a	Puerto Rico	Gunfire (Jayuya Uprising)
October 30, 1950	Ramon Robles-Castillo	Puerto Rico Police Bureau	—N/a	Puerto Rico	Gunfire (Jayuya Uprising)
October 30, 1950	Dionisio Rivera-Yolistruck	Puerto Rico Police Bureau	—N/a	Puerto Rico	Gunfire (Jayuya Uprising)
October 30, 1950	Luis Rivera-Cardona	Puerto Rico Police Bureau	—N/a	Puerto Rico	Gunfire (Jayuya Uprising)
October 30, 1950	Aurelio Miranda-Rivera	Puerto Rico Police Bureau	—N/a	Puerto Rico	Gunfire (Jayuya Uprising)
October 30, 1950	Jesus Feliciano-Rivera	Puerto Rico Police Bureau	—N/a	Puerto Rico	Gunfire (Jayuya Uprising)
October 30, 1950	Virgilio Camacho-Reyes	Puerto Rico Police Bureau	—N/a	Puerto Rico	Gunfire (Jayuya Uprising)
November 1, 1950	Leslie Coffelt	White House Police Force	Washington	District of Columbia	Gunfire
March 21, 1952	Oliver Williamson	Tennessee Highway Patrol	Haywood County	Tennessee	Tornado (Tornado outbreak of March 21–22, 1952)
July 26, 1952	Joseph Brock	Federal Bureau of Investigation	New York City	New York	Gunfire (Gerhard Puff)
November 22, 1952	Eugene Smith	Air Force Office of Special Investigations	Chugach Census Area	Alaska	Aircraft accident (1952 Mount Gannett C-124 crash)
August 31, 1954	Daniel O'Brien	Rhode Island State Police	South Kingstown	Rhode Island	Drowned (Hurricane Carol)
August 19, 1955	Charles Yodkins	Farmington Police Department	Farmington	Connecticut	Drowned (Hurricane Diane)
August 19, 1955	Billie Ellis	Princeton Township Police Department	Princeton	New Jersey	Drowned (Hurricane Diane)
December 24, 1955	John Talley	Sutter County Sheriff's Office	Yuba City	California	Drowned (1955 Yuba–Sutter floods)
December 24, 1955	Charles Blackburn	Sutter County Sheriff's Office	Yuba City	California	Drowned (1955 Yuba–Sutter floods)
January 5, 1956	Harold Pearce	Buchanan County Sheriff's Office	Independence	Iowa	Gunfire (Warren John Nutter)
January 25, 1956	Lyons Kelliher	Chicago Police Department	Chicago	Illinois	Gunfire

=== 1960s ===
Date	Name	Department	Location	State/territory	Cause of death
November 22, 1963	J. D. Tippit	Dallas Police Department	Dallas	Texas	Gunfire
June 2, 1965	David Rogers	Washington Parish Sheriff's Office	Varnado	Louisiana	Gunfire (Murder of Oneal Moore)
June 2, 1965	Oneal Moore	Washington Parish Sheriff's Office	Varnado	Louisiana	Gunfire (Murder of Oneal Moore)
July 5, 1965	Coley McDonough	Pittsburgh Bureau of Police	Pittsburgh	Pennsylvania	Gunfire
August 13, 1965	Ronald Ludlow	Los Angeles County Sheriff's Department	Los Angeles	California	Gunfire (Watts riots)
May 17, 1966	Terry Anderson	Federal Bureau of Investigation	Huntingdon County	Pennsylvania	Gunfire (Kidnapping of Peggy Ann Bradnick)
August 1, 1966	Billy Speed	Austin Police Department	Austin	Texas	Gunfire (University of Texas tower shooting)
June 17, 1967	Theodore Newton Jr.	United States Border Patrol	Riverside County	California	Gunfire (Murders of Theodore L. Newton Jr. and George F. Azrak)
June 17, 1967	George Azrak	United States Border Patrol	Riverside County	California	Gunfire (Murders of Theodore L. Newton Jr. and George F. Azrak)
July 14, 1967	Frederick Toto	Newark Police Department	Newark	New Jersey	Gunfire (1967 Newark riots)
July 16, 1967	John Gleason	Plainfield Police Department	Plainfield	New Jersey	Unarmed assault (1967 Plainfield riots)
July 25, 1967	Jerome Olshove	Detroit Police Department	Detroit	Michigan	Gunfire (Friendly fire; 1967 Detroit riot)
July 31, 1967	Bryan Moschea	Milwaukee Police Department	Milwaukee	Wisconsin	Gunfire (1967 Milwaukee riot)
January 16, 1968	Thomas Johnson	Metropolitan Nashville Police Department	Nashville	Tennessee	Gunfire (Charles Lee Herron)
March 17, 1968	Charles Thomasson	Metropolitan Nashville Police Department	Nashville	Tennessee	Gunfire (Charles Lee Herron)
July 23, 1968	Willard Wolff	Cleveland Division of Police	Cleveland	Ohio	Gunfire (Glenville shootout)
July 23, 1968	Leroy Jones	Cleveland Division of Police	Cleveland	Ohio	Gunfire (Glenville shootout)
July 23, 1968	Louis Golonka	Cleveland Division of Police	Cleveland	Ohio	Gunfire (Glenville shootout)
January 8, 1969	Edwin Woodriffe	Federal Bureau of Investigation	Washington	District of Columbia	Gunfire (Murders of Anthony Palmisano and Edwin R. Woodriffe)
January 8, 1969	Anthony Palmisano	Federal Bureau of Investigation	Washington	District of Columbia	Gunfire (Murders of Anthony Palmisano and Edwin R. Woodriffe)
August 1, 1969	Henry Schaad	York City Police Department	York	Pennsylvania	Gunfire (1969 York race riot)

=== 1970s ===
Date	Name	Department	Location	State/territory	Cause of death
February 18, 1970	Brian McDonnell	San Francisco Police Department	San Francisco	California	Bombing (San Francisco Police Department Park Station bombing)
April 5, 1970	Roger Gore	California Highway Patrol	Los Angeles County	California	Gunfire (Newhall incident)
April 5, 1970	Walter Frago	California Highway Patrol	Los Angeles County	California	Gunfire (Newhall incident)
April 6, 1970	James Pence	California Highway Patrol	Los Angeles County	California	Gunfire (Newhall incident)
April 6, 1970	George Alleyn	California Highway Patrol	Los Angeles County	California	Gunfire (Newhall incident)
June 12, 1970	William Brandt	Missouri State Highway Patrol	Macon County	Missouri	Tornado (Tornado outbreak sequence of June 10–16, 1970)
August 17, 1970	Larry Minard	Omaha Police Department	Omaha	Nebraska	Bombing (Rice–Poindexter case)
September 5, 1970	Gilbert Duthie	Arizona Department of Public Safety	Maricopa County	Arizona	Drowned (Tropical Storm Norma)
February 15, 1971	Arthur Robertson	Ellis County Sheriff's Department	Dallas	Texas	Gunfire (1971 shooting of Dallas police officers)
February 15, 1971	William Reese	Dallas County Sheriff's Department	Dallas	Texas	Gunfire (1971 shooting of Dallas police officers)
February 15, 1971	Samuel Infante Jr.	Dallas County Sheriff's Department	Dallas	Texas	Gunfire (1971 shooting of Dallas police officers)
August 21, 1971	Paul Krasenes	California Department of Corrections and Rehabilitation	Marin County	California	Stabbing (San Quentin Six)
August 21, 1971	Jere Graham	California Department of Corrections and Rehabilitation	Marin County	California	Stabbing (San Quentin Six)
August 21, 1971	Frank DeLeon	California Department of Corrections and Rehabilitation	Marin County	California	Stabbing (San Quentin Six)
September 11, 1971	William Quinn	New York State Department of Corrections and Community Supervision	Attica	New York	Armed assault (Attica Prison riot)
September 13, 1971	Carl Valone	New York State Department of Corrections and Community Supervision	Attica	New York	Gunfire (Friendly fire; Attica Prison riot)
September 13, 1971	Ronald Werner	New York State Department of Corrections and Community Supervision	Attica	New York	Gunfire (Friendly fire; Attica Prison riot)
September 13, 1971	Richard Lewis	New York State Department of Corrections and Community Supervision	Attica	New York	Gunfire (Friendly fire; Attica Prison riot)
September 13, 1971	John D'Arcangelo Jr.	New York State Department of Corrections and Community Supervision	Attica	New York	Gunfire (Friendly fire; Attica Prison riot)
September 13, 1971	Edward Cunningham	New York State Department of Corrections and Community Supervision	Attica	New York	Gunfire (Friendly fire; Attica Prison riot)
October 9, 1971	Harrison Whalen	New York State Department of Corrections and Community Supervision	Attica	New York	Gunfire (Friendly fire; Attica Prison riot)
January 10, 1972	Ralph Wilder	East Baton Rouge Parish Sheriff's Office	Baton Rouge	Louisiana	Gunfire (1972 Baton Rouge shooting)
January 10, 1972	Ralph Hancock	East Baton Rouge Parish Sheriff's Office	Baton Rouge	Louisiana	Gunfire (1972 Baton Rouge shooting)
April 20, 1972	Phillip Cardillo	New York City Police Department	New York City	New York	Gunfire (1972 Harlem mosque incident)
June 9, 1972	Daniel Wickard	Rapid City Police Department	Rapid City	South Dakota	Drowned (1972 Black Hills flood)
June 21, 1972	Gordon Hufnagle	Lewisburg Borough Police Department	Lewisburg	Pennsylvania	Drowned (Hurricane Agnes)
June 27, 1972	Leo Van Winkle	Philadelphia Police Department	Philadelphia	Pennsylvania	Drowned (Hurricane Agnes)
December 31, 1972	Alfred Harrell	New Orleans Police Department	New Orleans	Louisiana	Gunfire (Mark Essex)
January 7, 1973	Louis Sirgo	New Orleans Police Department	New Orleans	Louisiana	Gunfire (Mark Essex)
January 7, 1973	Paul Persigo	New Orleans Police Department	New Orleans	Louisiana	Gunfire (Mark Essex)
January 7, 1973	Phillip Coleman	New Orleans Police Department	New Orleans	Louisiana	Gunfire (Mark Essex)
January 19, 1973	Stephen Gilroy	New York City Police Department	New York City	New York	Gunfire (1973 Brooklyn hostage crisis)
March 5, 1973	Edwin Hosli Sr.	New Orleans Police Department	New Orleans	Louisiana	Gunfire (Mark Essex)
July 23, 1973	Herbert Tibbs	United States Army Criminal Investigation Division	Normandy	Missouri	Aircraft accident (Ozark Air Lines Flight 809)
July 23, 1973	Elmer Heggen	United States Army Criminal Investigation Division	Normandy	Missouri	Aircraft accident (Ozark Air Lines Flight 809)
August 5, 1974	Charles Mann	Drug Enforcement Administration	Miami	Florida	Crushed (1974 Miami DEA building collapse)
August 5, 1974	Nickolas Fragos	Drug Enforcement Administration	Miami	Florida	Crushed (1974 Miami DEA building collapse)
August 29, 1974	William Cann	Union City Police Department	Union City	California	Gunfire (Assassination of William Cann)
September 20, 1974	Gail Cobb	Metropolitan Police Department of the District of Columbia	Washington	District of Columbia	Gunfire
December 1, 1974	Sheila Regan	Federal Bureau of Investigation	Clarke County	Virginia	Aircraft accident (TWA Flight 514)
December 1, 1974	Edward Knartzer	Federal Bureau of Investigation	Clarke County	Virginia	Aircraft accident (TWA Flight 514)
March 2, 1976	Elvin Wedge	Mason County Sheriff's Department	Point Pleasant	West Virginia	Bombing (1976 Mason County jail bombing)
March 2, 1976	Kenneth Love	Mason County Sheriff's Department	Point Pleasant	West Virginia	Bombing (1976 Mason County jail bombing)
March 9, 1976	Ernest Hesson	Mason County Sheriff's Department	Point Pleasant	West Virginia	Bombing (1976 Mason County jail bombing)
July 31, 1976	Willis Purdy	Colorado State Patrol	Larimer County	Colorado	Drowned (1976 Big Thompson River flood)
July 31, 1976	Michael Conley	Estes Park Police Department	Larimer County	Colorado	Drowned (1976 Big Thompson River flood)
July 4, 1977	Mack Cantrell	District of Columbia Protective Services Division	Washington	District of Columbia	Medical emergency (1977 Washington, D.C., attack and hostage taking)
September 6, 1979	Alvin Williams	Woodbridge Police Department	Woodbridge Township	New Jersey	Drowned (Hurricane David)

=== 1980s ===
Date	Name	Department	Location	State/territory	Cause of death
May 9, 1980	James Evans	Riverside County Sheriff's Department	San Bernardino County	California	Gunfire (Norco shootout)
December 4, 1980	Gregory Adams	Saxonburg Police Department	Saxonburg	Pennsylvania	Gunfire (Donald Eugene Webb)
December 11, 1980	Jack Ohrberg	Indianapolis Police Department	Indianapolis	Indiana	Gunfire (Murder of Jack Ohrberg)
October 20, 1981	Edward O'Grady	Nyack Police Department	Nyack	New York	Gunfire (1981 Brink's robbery)
October 20, 1981	Waverly Brown	Nyack Police Department	Nyack	New York	Gunfire (1981 Brink's robbery)
December 9, 1981	Daniel Faulkner	Philadelphia Police Department	Philadelphia	Pennsylvania	Gunfire (Mumia Abu-Jamal)
January 12, 1983	Robert Hester	Memphis Police Department	Memphis	Tennessee	Unarmed assault; stabbing (Shannon Street massacre)
July 16, 1983	Steven Mayer	Will County Sheriff's Office	Homer Township	Illinois	Gunfire (Milton Johnson)
August 17, 1983	Denis Foley	Will County Sheriff's Office	Homer Township	Illinois	Gunfire (Milton Johnson)
September 26, 1983	Jeffrey C. Brown	Cochise County Sheriff's Office	Miracle Valley	Arizona	Armed assault (Miracle Valley shootout; long-term injuries)
October 11, 1983	Russell Boyd	Texas Department of Public Safety	Waller County	Texas	Gunfire (Eliseo Moreno)
January 10, 1984	William Wilkerson	Orange County Sheriff's Office	Orlando	Florida	Gunfire (Thomas Harrison Provenzano)
May 19, 1984	Troy Duncan	Alaska State Troopers	Yukon-Koyukuk Census Area	Alaska	Gunfire (Michael Silka)
September 21, 1984	Irma Lozada	New York City Transit Police	New York City	New York	Gunfire
September 27, 1985	Bruce Smalls	South Carolina Highway Patrol	Jasper County	South Carolina	Gunfire (Murder of Bruce Smalls)
October 6, 1985	Herminio Lopez-Pilar	Puerto Rico Police Bureau	Santa Isabel	Puerto Rico	Drowned (1985 Puerto Rico floods)
October 6, 1985	Francisco Diaz-Melendez	Puerto Rico Police Bureau	Santa Isabel	Puerto Rico	Drowned (1985 Puerto Rico floods)
October 6, 1985	Pedro Burgos-Lacourt	Puerto Rico Police Bureau	Santa Isabel	Puerto Rico	Drowned (1985 Puerto Rico floods)
December 12, 1985	Dirk Miller	United States Army Criminal Investigation Division	Gander, Canada	—N/a	Aircraft accident (Arrow Air Flight 1285R)
February 8, 1986	Arleigh McCree	Los Angeles Police Department	Los Angeles	California	Explosion
April 11, 1986	Benjamin Grogan	Federal Bureau of Investigation	Pinecrest	Florida	Gunfire (1986 FBI Miami shootout)
April 11, 1986	Jerry Dove	Federal Bureau of Investigation	Pinecrest	Florida	Gunfire (1986 FBI Miami shootout)
September 5, 1986	Wayne Warwick	Hot Springs Police Department	Hot Springs	Arkansas	Gunfire (The Other Place Lounge shooting; long-term injuries)
September 23, 1986	Richard Raczkoski	Indian River County Sheriff's Office	Vero Beach	Florida	Gunfire (Murder of Richard Raczkoski)
December 31, 1986	Manuel Marrero-Otero	United States Secret Service	San Juan	Puerto Rico	Fire (Dupont Plaza Hotel arson)
April 23, 1987	Ronald Grogan	Palm Bay Police Department	Palm Bay	Florida	Gunfire (1987 Palm Bay shooting)
April 23, 1987	Gerald Johnson	Palm Bay Police Department	Palm Bay	Florida	Gunfire (1987 Palm Bay shooting)
June 9, 1987	Ira Parker	Inkster Police Department	Inkster	Michigan	Gunfire (Inkster police slayings)
June 9, 1987	Clay Hoover	Inkster Police Department	Inkster	Michigan	Gunfire (Inkster police slayings)
June 9, 1987	Daniel Dubiel	Inkster Police Department	Inkster	Michigan	Gunfire (Inkster police slayings)
February 9, 1988	Robert Wallis	Denver Police Department	Denver	Colorado	Struck by vehicle (Vehicle pursuit; Phillip Hutchinson)
February 26, 1988	Edward Byrne	New York City Police Department	New York City	New York	Gunfire (Murder of Edward Byrne)
September 22, 1988	Irma Ruiz	Chicago Police Department	Chicago	Illinois	Gunfire (1988 Chicago shootings)

=== 1990s ===
Date	Name	Department	Location	State/territory	Cause of death
October 30, 1990	Wallie Howard Jr.	Syracuse Police Department	Syracuse	New York	Gunfire (Murder of Wallie Howard Jr.)
January 18, 1991	Danny Parrish	Fort Pierce Police Department	Fort Pierce	Florida	Gunfire (Murder of Danny Parrish)
January 23, 1991	Darrell Lunsford	Nacogdoches County Constable's Office - Precinct 3	Garrison	Texas	Gunfire (Murder of Darrell Lunsford)
January 26, 1991	Glen Huber	New Mexico State Police	Chimayo	New Mexico	Gunfire (1991 Chimayo shootings)
January 26, 1991	Jerry Martinez	Rio Arriba County Sheriff's Office	Chimayo	New Mexico	Gunfire (1991 Chimayo shootings)
March 15, 1991	Jordan Dalton Jr.	Orange County Sheriff's Office	Orlando	Florida	Gunfire (Thomas Harrison Provenzano; long-term injuries)
October 20, 1991	John Grubensky	Oakland Police Department	Oakland	California	Fire (Oakland firestorm of 1991)
January 3, 1992	Steven Ernest Bauer	North Miami Police Department	North Miami	Florida	Gunfire (Murder of Steven Bauer)
April 11, 1992	Bill Davidson	Texas Highway Patrol	Jackson County	Texas	Gunfire (Ronald Ray Howard)
August 21, 1992	William Degan Jr.	United States Marshals Service	Boundary County	Idaho	Gunfire (Ruby Ridge standoff)
February 22, 1993	James MacDonald	Compton Police Department	Compton	California	Gunfire (Regis Deon Thomas)
February 22, 1993	Kevin Burrell	Compton Police Department	Compton	California	Gunfire (Regis Deon Thomas)
February 28, 1993	Steven Willis	Bureau of Alcohol, Tobacco, Firearms and Explosives	McLennan County	Texas	Gunfire (Waco siege)
February 28, 1993	John Williams	Bureau of Alcohol, Tobacco, Firearms and Explosives	McLennan County	Texas	Gunfire (Waco siege)
February 28, 1993	Todd McKeehan	Bureau of Alcohol, Tobacco, Firearms and Explosives	McLennan County	Texas	Gunfire (Waco siege)
February 28, 1993	Conway LeBleu	Bureau of Alcohol, Tobacco, Firearms and Explosives	McLennan County	Texas	Gunfire (Waco siege)
October 4, 1993	Roger Motley	Opelika Police Department	Opelika	Alabama	Gunfire (Lynda Lyon Block)
December 2, 1993	James O'Brien	Oxnard Police Department	Ventura	California	Gunfire (1993 Oxnard unemployment office shooting)
August 14, 1994	Dennis Glivar	Garfield Heights Police Department	Garfield Heights	Ohio	Gunfire (Harry Mitts Jr.)
March 4, 1995	Ronald Williams	New Orleans Police Department	New Orleans	Louisiana	Gunfire (Kim Anh murders)
April 19, 1995	Alan Whicher	United States Secret Service	Oklahoma City	Oklahoma	Bombing (Oklahoma City bombing)
April 19, 1995	Kenneth McCullough	Drug Enforcement Administration	Oklahoma City	Oklahoma	Bombing (Oklahoma City bombing)
April 19, 1995	Claude Medearis	United States Customs Service	Oklahoma City	Oklahoma	Bombing (Oklahoma City bombing)
April 19, 1995	Mickey Maroney	United States Secret Service	Oklahoma City	Oklahoma	Bombing (Oklahoma City bombing)
April 19, 1995	Michael Loudenslager	Oklahoma County Sheriff's Office	Oklahoma City	Oklahoma	Crushed (Oklahoma City bombing)
April 19, 1995	Donald Leonard	United States Secret Service	Oklahoma City	Oklahoma	Bombing (Oklahoma City bombing)
April 19, 1995	Paul Ice	United States Customs Service	Oklahoma City	Oklahoma	Bombing (Oklahoma City bombing)
April 19, 1995	Paul Broxterman	United States Department of Housing and Urban Development, Office of Inspector General	Oklahoma City	Oklahoma	Bombing (Oklahoma City bombing)
April 19, 1995	Cynthia Brown	United States Secret Service	Oklahoma City	Oklahoma	Bombing (Oklahoma City bombing)
August 22, 1995	Charles Barton	Loudon County Sheriff's Office	Carroll County	Georgia	Aircraft accident (Atlantic Southeast Airlines Flight 529)
January 2, 1996	Lauretha Vaird	Philadelphia Police Department	Philadelphia	Pennsylvania	Gunfire (Murder of Lauretha Vaird)
April 3, 1996	Duane Christian	United States Department of Commerce Office of Security	Jasenice, Croatia	—N/a	Aircraft accident (1996 Croatia USAF CT-43 crash)
January 17, 1997	Clarence Dean	Los Angeles Police Department	Los Angeles	California	Automobile accident (Single-vehicle crash; 1994 Northridge earthquake)
August 19, 1997	Scott Philipps	New Hampshire State Police	Colebrook	New Hampshire	Gunfire (Carl Drega)
August 19, 1997	Leslie Lord	New Hampshire State Police	Colebrook	New Hampshire	Gunfire (Carl Drega)
January 12, 1998	Kyle Dinkheller	Laurens County Sheriff's Office	Laurens County	Georgia	Gunfire (Murder of Kyle Dinkheller)
May 19, 1998	Randy Bell	Tampa Police Department	Tampa	Florida	Gunfire (Hank Earl Carr)
May 19, 1998	Ricky Childers	Tampa Police Department	Tampa	Florida	Gunfire (Hank Earl Carr)
May 19, 1998	James Crooks	Florida Highway Patrol	Pasco County	Florida	Gunfire (Hank Earl Carr)
July 24, 1998	John Gibson	United States Capitol Police	Washington	District of Columbia	Gunfire (1998 United States Capitol shooting)
July 24, 1998	Jacob Chestnut	United States Capitol Police	Washington	District of Columbia	Gunfire (1998 United States Capitol shooting)
December 28, 1999	David Knapps	Louisiana Department of Corrections	Louisiana State Penitentiary	Louisiana	Armed assault (Murder of David Knapps)

=== 2000s ===
Date	Name	Department	Location	State/territory	Cause of death
February 10, 2000	John Garlington	Louisiana Department of Wildlife & Fisheries – Enforcement Division	Bienville Parish	Louisiana	Drowned
September 29, 2000	William Toney	Beech Grove Police Department	Beech Grove	Indiana	Gunfire (Benjamin Ritchie)
December 15, 2000	Derwin Brown	DeKalb County Police Department	Decatur	Georgia	Gunfire
December 24, 2000	Aubrey Hawkins	Irving Police Department	Irving	Texas	Gunfire (Texas Seven)
July 6, 2001	Harold Ray Presley	Lee County Sheriff's Department	Saltillo	Mississippi	Gunfire
August 31, 2001	Hagop Kuredjian	Los Angeles County Sheriff's Department	Stevenson Ranch	California	Gunfire (Stevenson Ranch shootout)
September 11, 2001	Dominick Pezzulo	Port Authority of New York and New Jersey Police Department	New York City	New York	Crushed (September 11 attacks)
September 11, 2001	Leonard W. Hatton Jr.	Federal Bureau of Investigation	New York City	New York	Crushed (September 11 attacks)
September 11, 2001	Vincent Danz	New York City Police Department	New York City	New York	Crushed (September 11 attacks)
April 13, 2002	Sam Catron	Pulaski County Sheriff's Office	Stab	Kentucky	Gunfire (Murder of Sam Catron)
November 19, 2002	David Mobilio	Red Bluff Police Department	Red Bluff	California	Gunfire (Andrew Mickel)
June 23, 2003	Rodney Pocceschi	Virginia Beach Police Department	Virginia Beach	Virginia	Gunfire
June 24, 2003	Fred Small	Inglewood Police Department	Ponoma	California	Automobile accident
December 8, 2003	Danny Wilson	Abbeville County Sheriff's Office	Abbeville County	South Carolina	Gunfire (2003 standoff in Abbeville, South Carolina)
December 8, 2003	Donnie Ouzts	Abbeville County Magistrate's Office	Abbeville County	South Carolina	Gunfire (2003 standoff in Abbeville, South Carolina)
June 17, 2004	Carlos Owen	Birmingham Police Department	Birmingham	Alabama	Gunfire (Execution of Nathaniel Woods)
June 17, 2004	Alfred Chisholm	Birmingham Police Department	Birmingham	Alabama	Gunfire (Execution of Nathaniel Woods)
June 17, 2004	Charles Bennett	Birmingham Police Department	Birmingham	Alabama	Gunfire (Execution of Nathaniel Woods)
January 26, 2005	James Tutino	Los Angeles County Sheriff's Department	Glendale/Los Angeles	California	Train accident (2005 Glendale train crash)
March 11, 2005	Hoyt Teasley	Fulton County Sheriff's Office	Atlanta	Georgia	Gunfire (Brian Nichols)
March 11, 2005	David Wilhelm	United States Immigration and Customs Enforcement	Atlanta	Georgia	Gunfire (Brian Nichols)
March 20, 2005	Carl Graham Jr.	Missouri State Highway Patrol	Carter County	Missouri	Gunfire (Murder of Carl Graham Jr.)
February 4, 2006	Jim Sell	Gassville Police Department	Gassville	Arkansas	Gunfire (Jacob D. Rodiba)
August 21, 2006	Eric Sutphin	Montgomery County Sheriff's Department	Montgomery County	Virginia	Gunfire (William Morva)
October 16, 2006	Michael Briggs	Manchester Police Department	Manchester	New Hampshire	Gunfire (Murder of Michael Briggs)
May 8, 2007	Robert Buckman	Macksville Police Department	Stafford County	Kansas	Tornado (Tornado outbreak of May 4–6, 2007)
May 19, 2007	Lee Newbill	Moscow Police Department	Moscow	Idaho	Gunfire (2007 Moscow, Idaho, shooting)
July 14, 2007	Russel Timoshenko	New York City Police Department	New York City	New York	Gunfire (Murder of Russel Timoshenko)
February 7, 2008	William Biggs	Kirkwood Police Department	Kirkwood	Missouri	Gunfire (Kirkwood City Council shooting)
February 7, 2008	Tom Ballman	Kirkwood Police Department	Kirkwood	Missouri	Gunfire (Kirkwood City Council shooting)
September 2, 2008	Anne Jackson	Skagit County Sheriff's Office	Alger	Washington	Gunfire (2008 Skagit County shootings)
September 12, 2008	Spree Desha	Los Angeles Police Department	Los Angeles	California	Train accident (2008 Chatsworth train collision)
December 12, 2008	Tom Tennant	Woodburn Police Department	Woodburn	Oregon	Bombing (Woodburn bank bombing)
December 12, 2008	William Hakim	Oregon State Police	Woodburn	Oregon	Bombing (Woodburn bank bombing)
March 19, 2009	Mark Parker	Orange County Sheriff's Office	Orlando	Florida	Gunfire (Thomas Harrison Provenzano; long-term injuries)
March 21, 2009	Daniel Sakai	Oakland Police Department	Oakland	California	Gunfire (2009 shootings of Oakland police officers)
March 21, 2009	Ervin Romans	Oakland Police Department	Oakland	California	Gunfire (2009 shootings of Oakland police officers)
March 21, 2009	Mark Dunakin	Oakland Police Department	Oakland	California	Gunfire (2009 shootings of Oakland police officers)
March 24, 2009	John Hege	Oakland Police Department	Oakland	California	Gunfire (2009 shootings of Oakland police officers)
April 4, 2009	Paul Sciullo	Pittsburgh Bureau of Police	Pittsburgh	Pennsylvania	Gunfire (2009 shooting of Pittsburgh police officers)
April 4, 2009	Stephen Mayhle	Pittsburgh Bureau of Police	Pittsburgh	Pennsylvania	Gunfire (2009 shooting of Pittsburgh police officers)
April 4, 2009	Eric Kelly	Pittsburgh Bureau of Police	Pittsburgh	Pennsylvania	Gunfire (2009 shooting of Pittsburgh police officers)
October 31, 2009	Timothy Brenton	Seattle Police Department	Seattle	Washington	Gunfire (Murder of Timothy Brenton)
November 29, 2009	Greg Richards	Lakewood Police Department	Lakewood	Washington	Gunfire (2009 Lakewood shooting)
November 29, 2009	Mark Renninger	Lakewood Police Department	Lakewood	Washington	Gunfire (2009 Lakewood shooting)
November 29, 2009	Ronald Owens	Lakewood Police Department	Lakewood	Washington	Gunfire (2009 Lakewood shooting)
November 29, 2009	Tina Griswold	Lakewood Police Department	Lakewood	Washington	Gunfire (2009 Lakewood shooting)

=== 2010s ===
Date	Name	Department	Location	State/territory	Cause of death
January 4, 2010	Stanley Cooper	United States Marshals Service	Las Vegas	Nevada	Gunfire (Las Vegas courthouse shooting)
May 20, 2010	Robert Paudert	West Memphis Police Department	Crittenden County	Arkansas	Gunfire (2010 West Memphis police shootings)
May 20, 2010	William Evans	West Memphis Police Department	Crittenden County	Arkansas	Gunfire (2010 West Memphis police shootings)
January 1, 2011	Suzanne Hopper	Clark County Sheriff's Office	Clark County	Ohio	Gunfire (Killing of Suzanne Hopper)
March 2, 2011	Nicholas Alden	United States Air Force Security Forces	Frankfurt, Germany	—N/a	Gunfire (2011 Frankfurt Airport shooting)
April 12, 2011	Ronald Johnson	South Dakota Department of Corrections	Sioux Falls	South Dakota	Armed assault (Murder of Ronald Johnson)
June 3, 2011	Jefferson Taylor	Riverside Police Division	Joplin	Missouri	Lightning (Joplin tornado)
August 13, 2012	Brian Bachmann	Brazos County Constable's Office - Precinct 1	College Station	Texas	Gunfire (2012 College Station shooting)
August 16, 2012	Jeremy Triche	St. John the Baptist Parish Sheriff's Office	LaPlace	Louisiana	Gunfire (2012 shootings of St. John the Baptist Parish police officers)
August 16, 2012	Brandon Nielsen	St. John the Baptist Parish Sheriff's Office	LaPlace	Louisiana	Gunfire (2012 shootings of St. John the Baptist Parish police officers)
December 24, 2012	Michael Chiapperini	Webster Police Department	Monroe County	New York	Gunfire (2012 Webster shooting)
February 3, 2013	Keith Lawrence	University of Southern California Department of Public Safety	Irvine	California	Gunfire (Christopher Dorner shootings and manhunt)
February 7, 2013	Michael Crain	Riverside Police Department	Riverside	California	Gunfire (Christopher Dorner shootings and manhunt)
February 12, 2013	Jeremiah MacKay	San Bernardino County Sheriff's Department	San Bernardino County	California	Gunfire (Christopher Dorner shootings and manhunt)
February 26, 2013	Elizabeth Butler	Santa Cruz Police Department	Santa Cruz	California	Gunfire (2013 shooting of Santa Cruz police officers)
February 26, 2013	Loran Baker	Santa Cruz Police Department	Santa Cruz	California	Gunfire (2013 shooting of Santa Cruz police officers)
March 13, 2013	Tom Clements	Colorado Department of Corrections	Monument	Colorado	Gunfire
April 3, 2013	Eugene Crum	Mingo County Sheriff's Office	Williamson	West Virginia	Gunfire
April 18, 2013	Sean Collier	Massachusetts Institute of Technology Police Department	Cambridge	Massachusetts	Gunfire (Boston Marathon bombing)
May 31, 2013	Cody Carpenter	Scott County Sheriff's Office	Scott County	Arkansas	Drowned (Tornado outbreak of May 26–31, 2013)
May 31, 2013	Joel Campora	Arkansas Game and Fish Commission	Scott County	Arkansas	Drowned (Tornado outbreak of May 26–31, 2013)
November 1, 2013	Gerardo I. Hernandez	Transportation Security Administration	Los Angeles	California	Gunfire (2013 Los Angeles International Airport shooting)
March 24, 2014	Mark Mayo	United States Navy Security Forces	Norfolk	Virginia	Gunfire (Norfolk Navy Station shooting)
May 1, 2014	Gabriel Rich	Alaska State Troopers	Tanana	Alaska	Gunfire (2014 Alaska State Trooper killings)
May 1, 2014	Patrick Johnson	Alaska State Troopers	Tanana	Alaska	Gunfire (2014 Alaska State Trooper killings)
June 8, 2014	Igor Soldo	Las Vegas Metropolitan Police Department	Las Vegas	Nevada	Gunfire (2014 Las Vegas shootings)
June 8, 2014	Alyn Beck	Las Vegas Metropolitan Police Department	Las Vegas	Nevada	Gunfire (2014 Las Vegas shootings)
June 17, 2014	Javier Vega Jr.	United States Border Patrol	Willacy County	Texas	Gunfire (Murder of Javier Vega Jr.)
August 10, 2014	Dennis Simmonds	Boston Police Department	Watertown	Massachusetts	Bombing (Boston Marathon bombings; long-term injuries)
September 12, 2014	Bryon Dickson	Pennsylvania State Police	Pike County	Pennsylvania	Gunfire (2014 Pennsylvania State Police barracks attack)
December 20, 2014	Rafael Ramos	New York City Police Department	New York City	New York	Gunfire (Killing of Rafael Ramos and Wenjian Liu)
December 20, 2014	Wenjian Liu	New York City Police Department	New York City	New York	Gunfire (Killing of Rafael Ramos and Wenjian Liu)
May 2, 2015	Brian Moore	New York City Police Department	New York City	New York	Gunfire (Murder of Brian Moore)
August 28, 2015	Darren Goforth	Harris County Sheriff's Office	Harris County	Texas	Gunfire (Murder of Darren Goforth)
October 2, 2015	Nathan Sartain	United States Air Force Security Forces	Jalalabad, Afghanistan	—N/a	Aircraft accident (2015 Jalalabad USAF C-130J crash)
October 2, 2015	Kcey Ruiz	United States Air Force Security Forces	Jalalabad, Afghanistan	—N/a	Aircraft accident (2015 Jalalabad USAF C-130J crash)
November 27, 2015	Garrett Swasey	University of Colorado at Colorado Springs Police Department	Colorado Springs	Colorado	Gunfire (Colorado Springs Planned Parenthood shooting)
November 28, 2015	Lloyd Reed	St. Clair Township Police Department	New Florence	Pennsylvania	Gunfire (Killing of Lloyd Reed)
December 21, 2015	Adrianna Vorderbruggen	Air Force Office of Special Investigations	Bagram, Afghanistan	—N/a	Bombing (2015 Bagram Airfield bombing)
December 21, 2015	Peter Taub	Air Force Office of Special Investigations	Bagram, Afghanistan	—N/a	Bombing (2015 Bagram Airfield bombing)
December 21, 2015	Chester McBride III	Air Force Office of Special Investigations	Bagram, Afghanistan	—N/a	Bombing (2015 Bagram Airfield bombing)
December 21, 2015	Joseph Lemm	Air Force Office of Special Investigations	Bagram, Afghanistan	—N/a	Bombing (2015 Bagram Airfield bombing)
December 21, 2015	Michael Cinco	Air Force Office of Special Investigations	Bagram, Afghanistan	—N/a	Bombing (2015 Bagram Airfield bombing)
December 21, 2015	Louis Bonocasa	Air Force Office of Special Investigations	Bagram, Afghanistan	—N/a	Bombing (2015 Bagram Airfield bombing)
July 7, 2016	Brent Thompson	Dallas Area Rapid Transit Police Department	Dallas	Texas	Gunfire (2016 shooting of Dallas police officers)
July 7, 2016	Patrick Zamarripa	Dallas Police Department	Dallas	Texas	Gunfire (2016 shooting of Dallas police officers)
July 7, 2016	Michael Smith	Dallas Police Department	Dallas	Texas	Gunfire (2016 shooting of Dallas police officers)
July 7, 2016	Michael Krol	Dallas Police Department	Dallas	Texas	Gunfire (2016 shooting of Dallas police officers)
July 8, 2016	Lorne Ahrens	Dallas Police Department	Dallas	Texas	Gunfire (2016 shooting of Dallas police officers)
July 11, 2016	Joseph Zangaro	Berrien County Trial Court	St. Joseph	Michigan	Gunfire (St. Joseph courthouse shooting)
July 11, 2016	Ronald Kienzle	Berrien County Trial Court	St. Joseph	Michigan	Gunfire (St. Joseph courthouse shooting)
July 17, 2016	Montrell Jackson	Baton Rouge Police Department	Baton Rouge	Louisiana	Gunfire (2016 shooting of Baton Rouge police officers)
July 17, 2016	Matthew Gerald	Baton Rouge Police Department	Baton Rouge	Louisiana	Gunfire (2016 shooting of Baton Rouge police officers)
July 17, 2016	Bradford Garafola	East Baton Rouge Parish Sheriff's Office	Baton Rouge	Louisiana	Gunfire (2016 shooting of Baton Rouge police officers)
November 2, 2016	Anthony Beminio	Des Moines Police Department	Des Moines	Iowa	Gunfire (2016 murders of Des Moines police officers)
November 2, 2016	Justin Martin	Des Moines Police Department	Des Moines	Iowa	Gunfire (2016 murders of Des Moines police officers)
November 20, 2016	Benjamin Marconi	San Antonio Police Department	San Antonio	Texas	Gunfire (Murder of Benjamin Marconi)
November 22, 2016	Collin Rose	Wayne State University Police Department	Detroit	Michigan	Gunfire (Killing of Collin Rose)
December 7, 2016	Nicholas Smarr	Americus Police Department	Americus	Georgia	Gunfire (Murders of Nicholas Smarr and Jody Smith)
December 8, 2016	Jody Smith	Georgia Southwestern State University Department of Public Safety	Americus	Georgia	Gunfire (Murders of Nicholas Smarr and Jody Smith)
March 22, 2017	Jason Weiland	Everest Metropolitan Police Department	Weston	Wisconsin	Gunfire (2017 Marathon County shootings)
April 26, 2017	Stephen Ballard	Delaware State Police	Bear	Delaware	Gunfire (Killing of Stephen Ballard)
May 12, 2017	Steven Eric Disario	Kirkersville Police Department	Kirkersville	Ohio	Gunfire (Kirkersville shooting)
May 27, 2017	William Durr	Lincoln County Sheriff's Office	Lincoln County	Mississippi	Gunfire (2017 Mississippi shootings)
August 12, 2017	Jay Cullen	Virginia State Police	Albemarle County	Virginia	Aircraft accident (Unite the Right rally)
August 12, 2017	Berke Bates	Virginia State Police	Albemarle County	Virginia	Aircraft accident (Unite the Right rally)
August 18, 2017	Richard "Sam" Howard	Kissimmee Police Department	Kissimmee	Florida	Gunfire (2017 Kissimmee Police Department officer killings)
August 18, 2017	Matthew Baxter	Kissimmee Police Department	Kissimmee	Florida	Gunfire (2017 Kissimmee Police Department officer killings)
August 27, 2017	Steve Perez	Houston Police Department	Houston	Texas	Drowned (Hurricane Harvey)
September 10, 2017	Joseph Ossman	Florida Department of Corrections	Hardee County	Florida	Automobile accident (Hurricane Irma)
September 10, 2017	Julie Bridges	Hardee County Sheriff's Office	Hardee County	Florida	Automobile accident (Hurricane Irma)
September 21, 2017	Héctor Torres	Puerto Rico Police Bureau	Aguada	Puerto Rico	Drowned (Hurricane Maria)
September 21, 2017	Ángel González	Puerto Rico Police Bureau	Aguada	Puerto Rico	Drowned (Hurricane Maria)
October 1, 2017	Charleston Hartfield	Las Vegas Metropolitan Police Department	Paradise	Nevada	Gunfire (2017 Las Vegas shooting)
October 12, 2017	Justin Smith	North Carolina Department of Public Safety	Elizabeth City	North Carolina	Armed assault (Pasquotank County prison murders)
October 30, 2017	Wendy Shannon	North Carolina Department of Public Safety	Elizabeth City	North Carolina	Armed assault (Pasquotank County prison murders)
December 31, 2017	Zackari Parrish	Douglas County Sheriff's Office	Highlands Ranch	Colorado	Gunfire (Copper Canyon Apartment Homes shooting)
February 10, 2018	Anthony Morelli	Westerville Division of Police	Westerville	Ohio	Gunfire (Murders of Eric Joering and Anthony Morelli)
February 10, 2018	Eric Joering	Westerville Division of Police	Westerville	Ohio	Gunfire (Murders of Eric Joering and Anthony Morelli)
September 7, 2018	Aaron Paul Roberts	Greene County Sheriff's Office	Greene County	Missouri	Drowned (Tropical Storm Gordon)
October 3, 2018	Terrence Carraway	Florence Police Department	Florence County	South Carolina	Gunfire (Florence, South Carolina shooting)
October 22, 2018	Farrah Turner	Florence County Sheriff's Office	Florence County	South Carolina	Gunfire (Florence, South Carolina shooting)
November 7, 2018	Ron Helus	Ventura County Sheriff's Office	Thousand Oaks	California	Gunfire (Thousand Oaks shooting)
November 19, 2018	Samuel Jimenez	Chicago Police Department	Chicago	Illinois	Gunfire (Mercy Hospital shooting)
December 26, 2018	Ronil Singh	Newman Police Department	Newman	California	Gunfire (Murder of Ronil Singh)
March 5, 2019	Nathan Heidelberg	Midland Police Department	Midland	Texas	Gunfire (Killing of Nathan Heidelberg)
March 13, 2019	Daniel Groves	Colorado State Patrol	Weld County	Colorado	Struck by vehicle (March 2019 North American blizzard)
December 10, 2019	Joseph Seals	Jersey City Police Department	Jersey City	New Jersey	Gunfire (2019 Jersey City shooting)

=== 2020s ===
Date	Name	Department	Location	State/territory	Cause of death
March 16, 2020	Christopher Ryan Walsh	Springfield Police Department	Springfield	Missouri	Gunfire (2020 Springfield, Missouri shooting)
May 29, 2020	David Patrick Underwood	United States Federal Protective Service	Oakland	California	Gunfire (2020 boogaloo murders)
June 6, 2020	Damon Gutzwiller	Santa Cruz County Sheriff's Office	Ben Lomond	California	Gunfire (2020 boogaloo murders)
July 22, 2020	William K. Nichols	DeSoto County Sheriff's Office	Miramar	Florida	Drowned (Hurricane Hanna)
January 7, 2021	Brian David Sicknick	United States Capitol Police	Washington	District of Columbia	Medical emergency (Death of Brian Sicknick)
February 2, 2021	Laura Schwartzenberger	Federal Bureau of Investigation	Sunrise	Florida	Gunfire (2021 Sunrise, Florida shootout)
February 2, 2021	Daniel Alfin	Federal Bureau of Investigation	Sunrise	Florida	Gunfire (2021 Sunrise, Florida shootout)
March 22, 2021	Eric Talley	Boulder Police Department	Boulder	Colorado	Gunfire (2021 Boulder shooting)
April 2, 2021	William Evans	United States Capitol Police	Washington	District of Columbia	Vehicle ramming attack (2021 United States Capitol car attack)
September 2, 2021	Brian Mohl	Connecticut State Police	Woodbury	Connecticut	Automobile accident; drowned (Single-vehicle crash; Hurricane Ida)
September 16, 2021	Austin Bush	Houma Police Department	Schriever	Louisiana	Automobile accident (Single vehicle crash; Hurricane Ida)
December 10, 2021	Robert Daniel	Graves County Jail	Mayfield	Kentucky	Tornado (2021 Western Kentucky tornado)
March 17, 2022	Barbara Fenley	Eastland County Sheriff's Office	Carbon	Texas	Fire (2022 Texas wildfires)
May 5, 2022	Nicholas Tullier	East Baton Rouge Parish Sheriff's Office	Baton Rouge	Louisiana	Gunfire (2016 shooting of Baton Rouge police officers; long-term injuries)
June 30, 2022	William Petry	Floyd County Sheriff's Office	Allen	Kentucky	Gunfire (2022 shooting of Kentucky police officers)
June 30, 2022	Ralph Frasure	Prestonsburg Police Department	Allen	Kentucky	Gunfire (2022 shooting of Kentucky police officers)
July 1, 2022	Jacob Chaffins	Prestonsburg Police Department	Allen	Kentucky	Gunfire (2022 shooting of Kentucky police officers)
October 12, 2022	Alex Hamzy	Bristol Police Department	Bristol	Connecticut	Gunfire (Bristol, Connecticut police killings)
October 12, 2022	Dustin DeMonte	Bristol Police Department	Bristol	Connecticut	Gunfire (Bristol, Connecticut police killings)
October 13, 2022	Gabriel Torres	Raleigh Police Department	Raleigh	North Carolina	Gunfire (2022 Raleigh shootings)
February 19, 2023	Kenneth Fowler	Pontotoc County Sheriff's Office	Ada	Oklahoma	Fall (January 31 – February 2, 2023 North American ice storm)
July 14, 2023	Jake Wallin	Fargo Police Department	Fargo	North Dakota	Gunfire (2023 shooting of Fargo police officers)
February 18, 2024	Matthew Ruge	Burnsville Police Department	Burnsville	Minnesota	Gunfire (2024 Burnsville shooting)
February 18, 2024	Paul Elmstrand	Burnsville Police Department	Burnsville	Minnesota	Gunfire (2024 Burnsville shooting)
March 4, 2024	Bryan Sweetman	Harris County Sheriff's Office	Harris County	Texas	Chemical exposure (Hurricane Harvey; long-term illness)
March 25, 2024	Jonathan Diller	New York City Police Department	New York City	New York	Gunfire (Killing of Jonathan Diller)
April 29, 2024	Thomas Weeks	United States Marshals Service	Charlotte	North Carolina	Gunfire (2024 Charlotte shootout)
April 29, 2024	Samuel Poloche	North Carolina Department of Adult Correction	Charlotte	North Carolina	Gunfire (2024 Charlotte shootout)
April 29, 2024	Alden Elliott	North Carolina Department of Adult Correction	Charlotte	North Carolina	Gunfire (2024 Charlotte shootout)
April 29, 2024	Joshua Eyer	Charlotte-Mecklenburg Police Department	Charlotte	North Carolina	Gunfire (2024 Charlotte shootout)
May 30, 2024	Jamal Mitchell	Minneapolis Police Department	Minneapolis	Minnesota	Gunfire (2024 Minneapolis shooting)
September 27, 2024	Lynn Quintero	Madison County Sheriff's Office	Yancey County	North Carolina	Drowned (Hurricane Helene)
September 28, 2024	Jim Lau	Macon County Sheriff's Office	Macon County	North Carolina	Drowned (Hurricane Helene)
February 22, 2025	Andrew Duarte	West York Borough Police Department	Shiloh	Pennsylvania	Gunfire (Friendly fire; UPMC Memorial Hospital shooting)
July 18, 2025	William Osborn	Los Angeles County Sheriff's Department	East Los Angeles	California	Explosion (2025 East Los Angeles explosion)
July 18, 2025	Victor Lemus	Los Angeles County Sheriff's Department	East Los Angeles	California	Explosion (2025 East Los Angeles explosion)
July 18, 2025	Joshua Kelley-Eklund	Los Angeles County Sheriff's Department	East Los Angeles	California	Explosion (2025 East Los Angeles explosion)
July 28, 2025	Didarul Islam	New York City Police Department	New York City	New York	Gunfire (2025 Midtown Manhattan shooting)
September 17, 2025	Isaiah Emenheiser	Northern York County Regional Police Department	York County	Pennsylvania	Gunfire (2025 North Codorus Township shooting)
September 17, 2025	Cody Becker	Northern York County Regional Police Department	York County	Pennsylvania	Gunfire (2025 North Codorus Township shooting)
September 17, 2025	Mark Baker	Northern York County Regional Police Department	York County	Pennsylvania	Gunfire (2025 North Codorus Township shooting)
April 25, 2026	John Bartholomew	Chicago Police Department	Chicago	Illinois	Gunfire (2026 Chicago Endeavor Swedish Hospital shooting)
May 29, 2026	Logan Utt	Carroll County Sheriff's Office	Cana	Virginia	Gunfire

== Incidents where multiple law enforcement officers were killed ==
Year	Event	Officers killed
1886	Haymarket affair	7
1893	Battle of Ingalls	3
1902	Tuscumbia shooting	6
1906	Asheville shooting	2
1916	Black Tom explosion	2
1916	Everett massacre	2
1917	Milwaukee Police Department bombing	9
1921	Battle of Blair Mountain	4
1932	Young Brothers massacre	6
1933	Kansas City Massacre	4
1934	The Battle of Barrington	2
1950	Utuado uprising	8
1955	Hurricane Diane	2
1955	Yuba–Sutter floods	2
1965	Shooting of Washington Parish officers	2
1967	Murder and kidnapping of Border Patrol agents	2
1968	Shooting of Nashville police officers	2
1968	Glenville shootout	3
1969	FBI Washington D.C. shooting	2
1970	Newhall incident	4
1971	Shooting of Dallas police officers	3
1971	Attica prison riot	7
1971	San Quentin riot	3
1972	Baton Rouge shooting	2
1972	Hurricane Agnes	2
1972–73	Mark Essex shootings	5
1973	Ozark Air Lines Flight 809	2
1974	Miami DEA building collapse	2
1974	TWA Flight 514	2
1976	Mason County jail bombing	3
1976	Big Thompson River flood	2
1981	Brink's robbery	2
1983	Homer Township shooting	2
1984	Orange County courthouse shooting	3 (Note: One officer died of his injuries in 1991 and another in 2009)
1985	Puerto Rico floods	3
1986	FBI Miami shootout	2
1987	Palm Bay shooting	2
1987	Inkster police slayings	3
1988	Hank Earl Carr	3
1991	Chimayo shootings	2
1993	Compton shooting	2
1993	Waco siege	4
1995	Oklahoma City bombing	9
1997	Colebrook shooting	2
1998	United States Capitol shooting	2
2001	September 11 attacks	71 in the attacks, 1 in a related incident
2003	Standoff in Abbeville, South Carolina	2
2004	Birmingham shooting	3
2005	Atlanta courthouse shooting	2
2008	Kirkwood City Council shooting	2
2008	Woodburn bank bombing	2
2009	Shootings of Oakland police officers	4
2009	Shooting of Pittsburgh police officers	3
2009	Lakewood shooting	4
2010	West Memphis police shootings	2
2012	Shootings of St. John the Baptist Parish police officers	2
2013	Christopher Dorner shootings and manhunt	3
2013	Shooting of Santa Cruz police officers	2
2013	Boston Marathon bombing	2 (Note: Includes a victim who died in 2014 of his injuries)
2013	Tornado outbreak of May 26–31, 2013	2
2014	Alaska State Trooper killings	2
2014	Las Vegas shootings	2
2014	Shooting of Sacramento police officers	2
2014	Killing of Rafael Ramos and Wenjian Liu	2
2015	Jalalabad USAF C-130J crash	2
2015	Bagram Airfield bombing	6
2016	Shooting of Dallas police officers	5
2016	St. Joseph courthouse shooting	2
2016	Shooting of Baton Rouge police officers	4
2016	Murders of Des Moines police officers	2
2017	Hurricane Harvey	2 (Note: One officer died of chemical exposure in 2024)
2017	Hurricane Irma	2
2017	Hurricane Maria	2
2017	Unite the Right rally	2
2017	2017 Pasquotank County prison murders	2
2017	2017 Kissimmee Police Department officer killings	2
2018	Murders of Eric Joering and Anthony Morelli	2
2018	Florence, South Carolina shooting	2
2020	Boogaloo murders	2
2021	Sunrise, Florida shootout	2
2021	Hurricane Ida	2
2022	Shooting of Kentucky police officers	3
2022	Bristol, Connecticut police killings	2
2024	Burnsville shooting	2
2024	Charlotte shootout	4
2024	Hurricane Helene	2
2025	East Los Angeles explosion	3
2025	North Codorus Township shooting	3

== Gallery ==
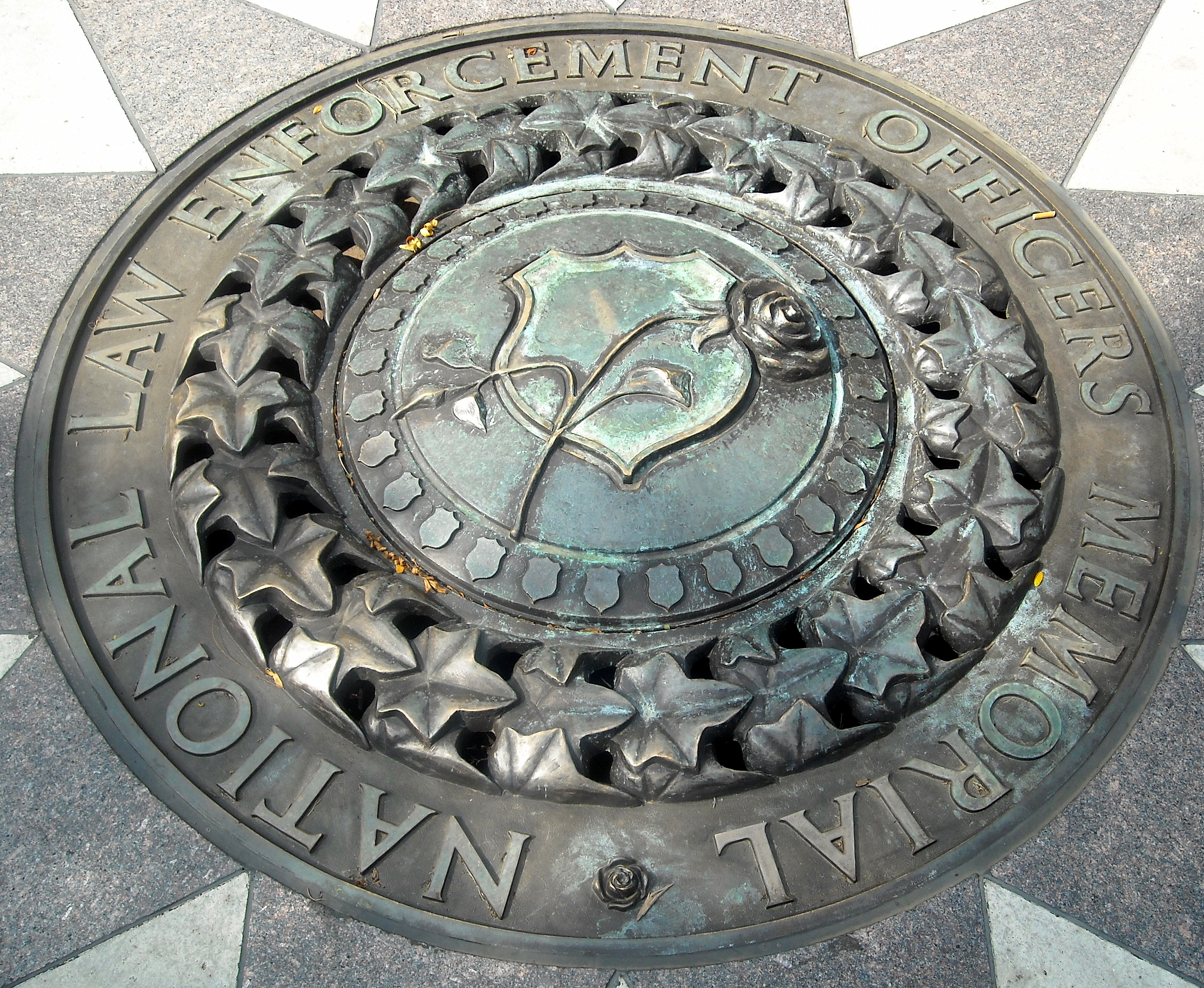
National Law Enforcement Officers Memorial in Washington, D.C.

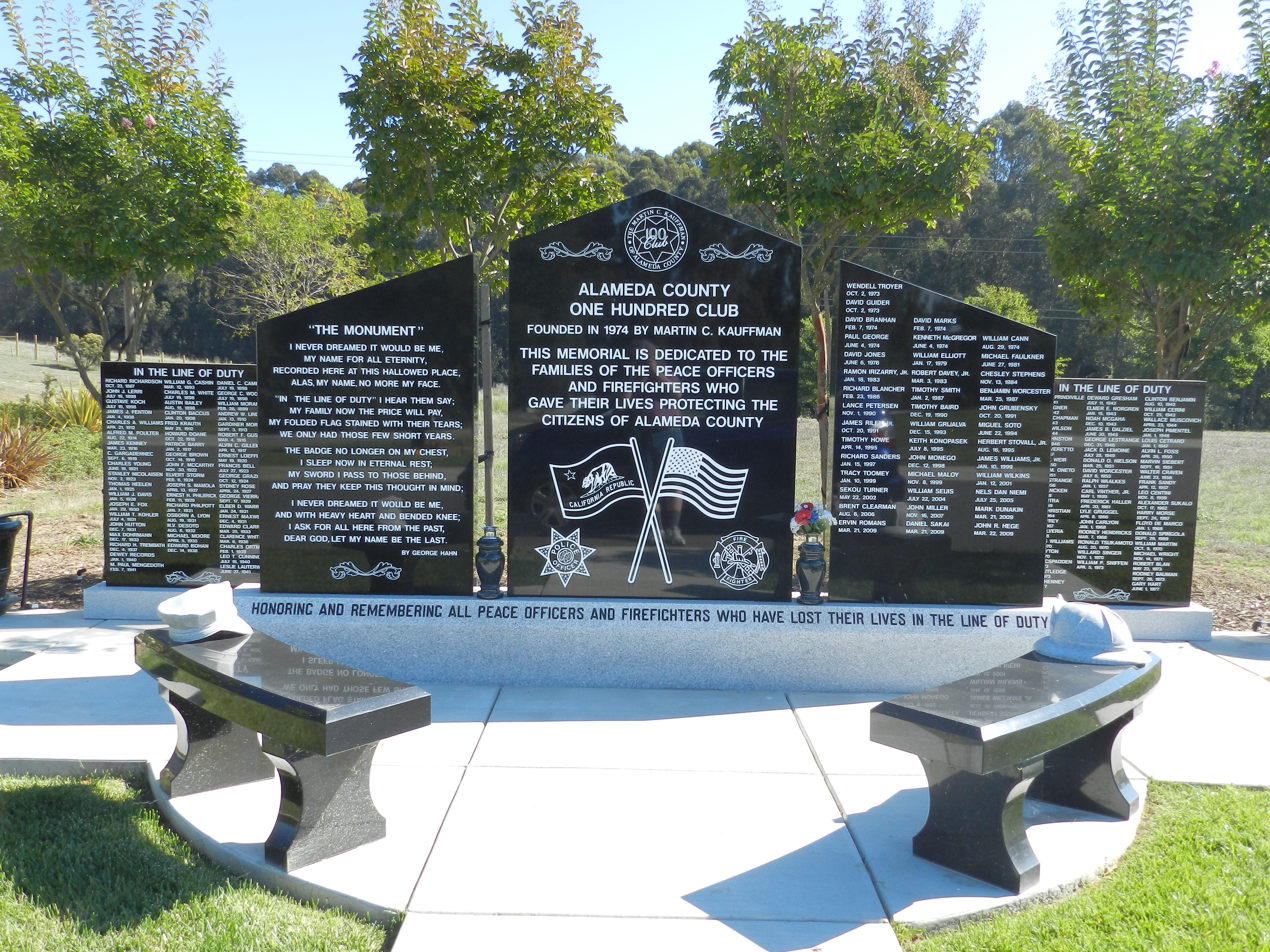
Memorial in Alameda County, California

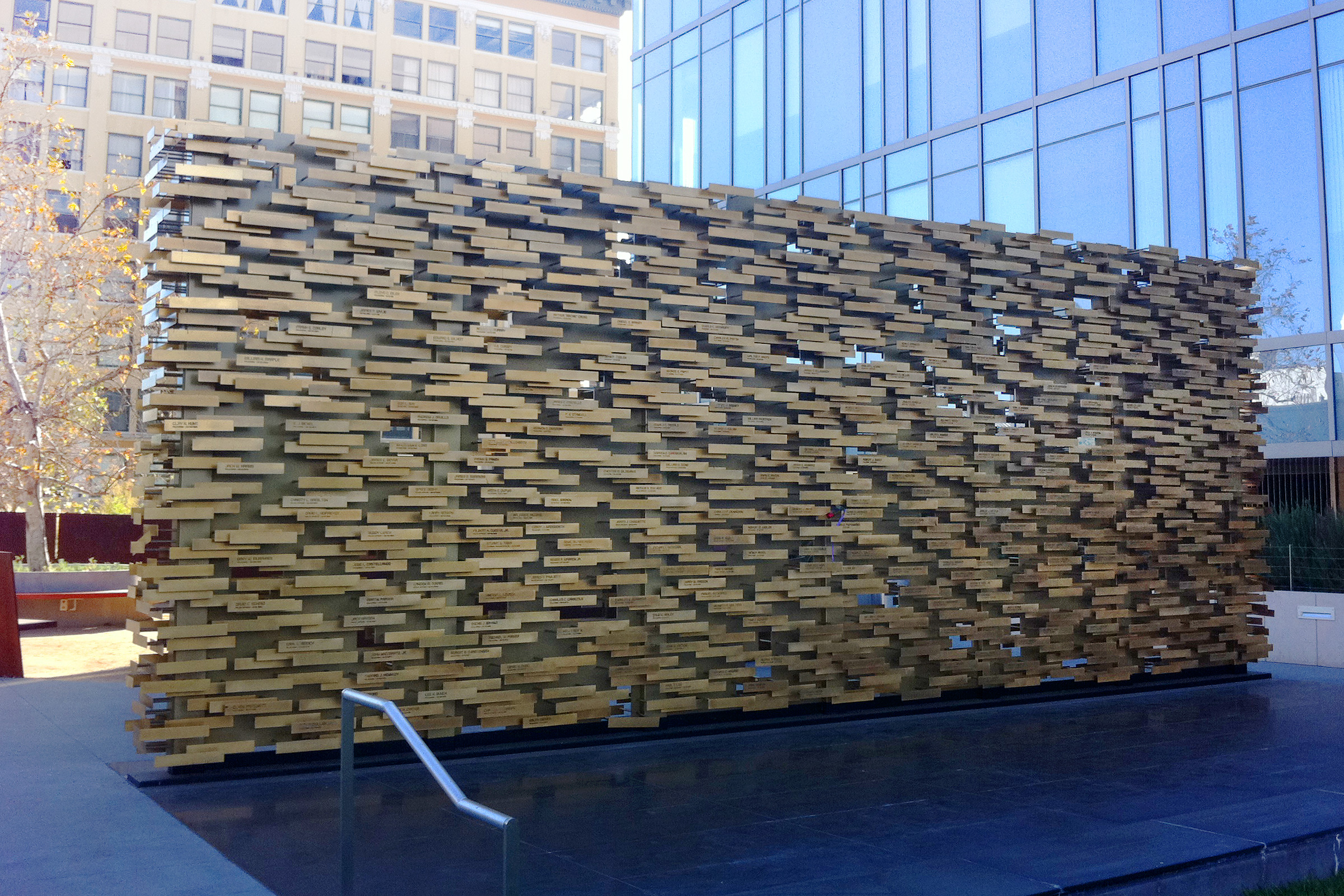
Los Angeles Police Department memorial

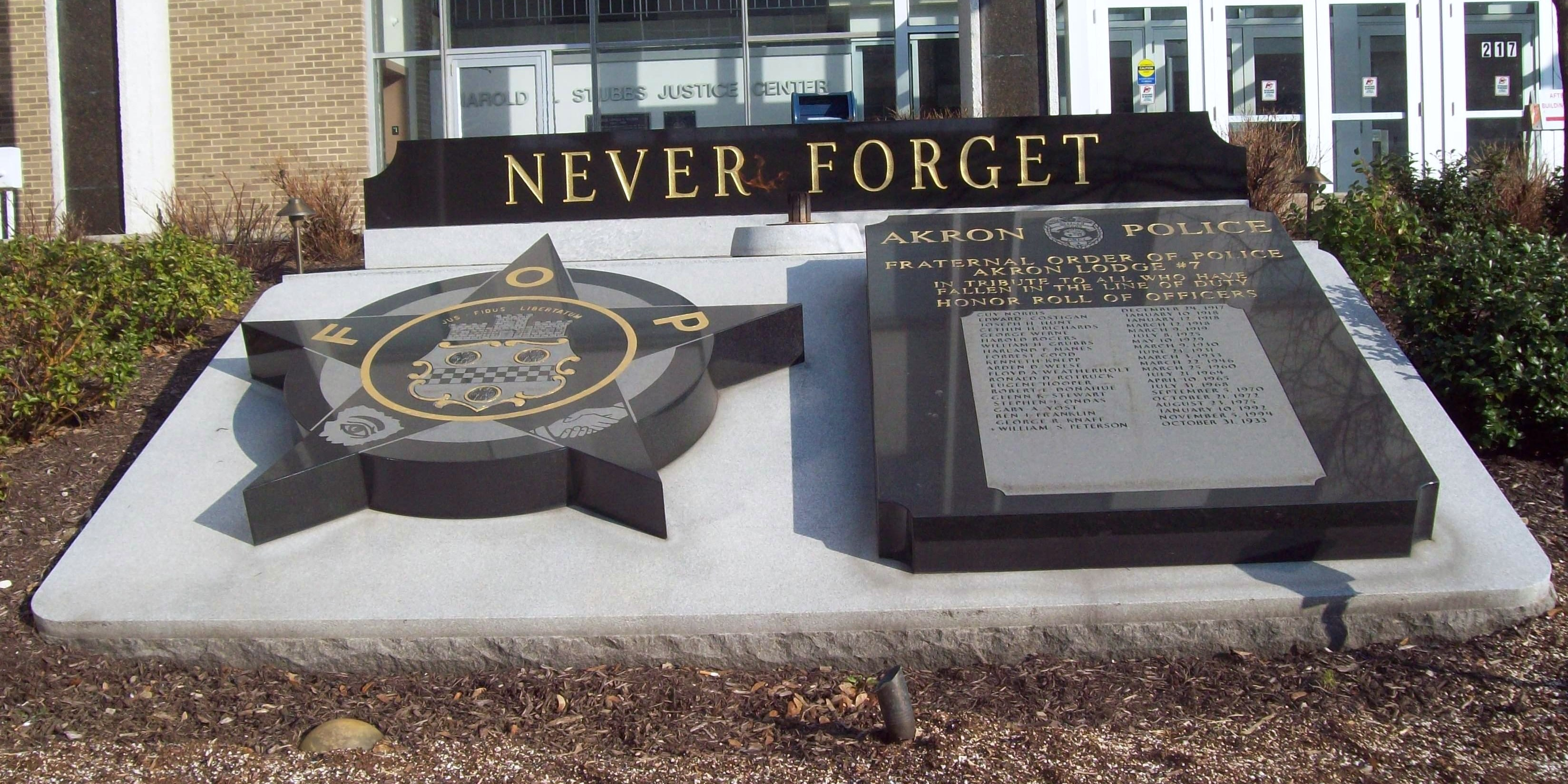
Memorial in Akron, Ohio

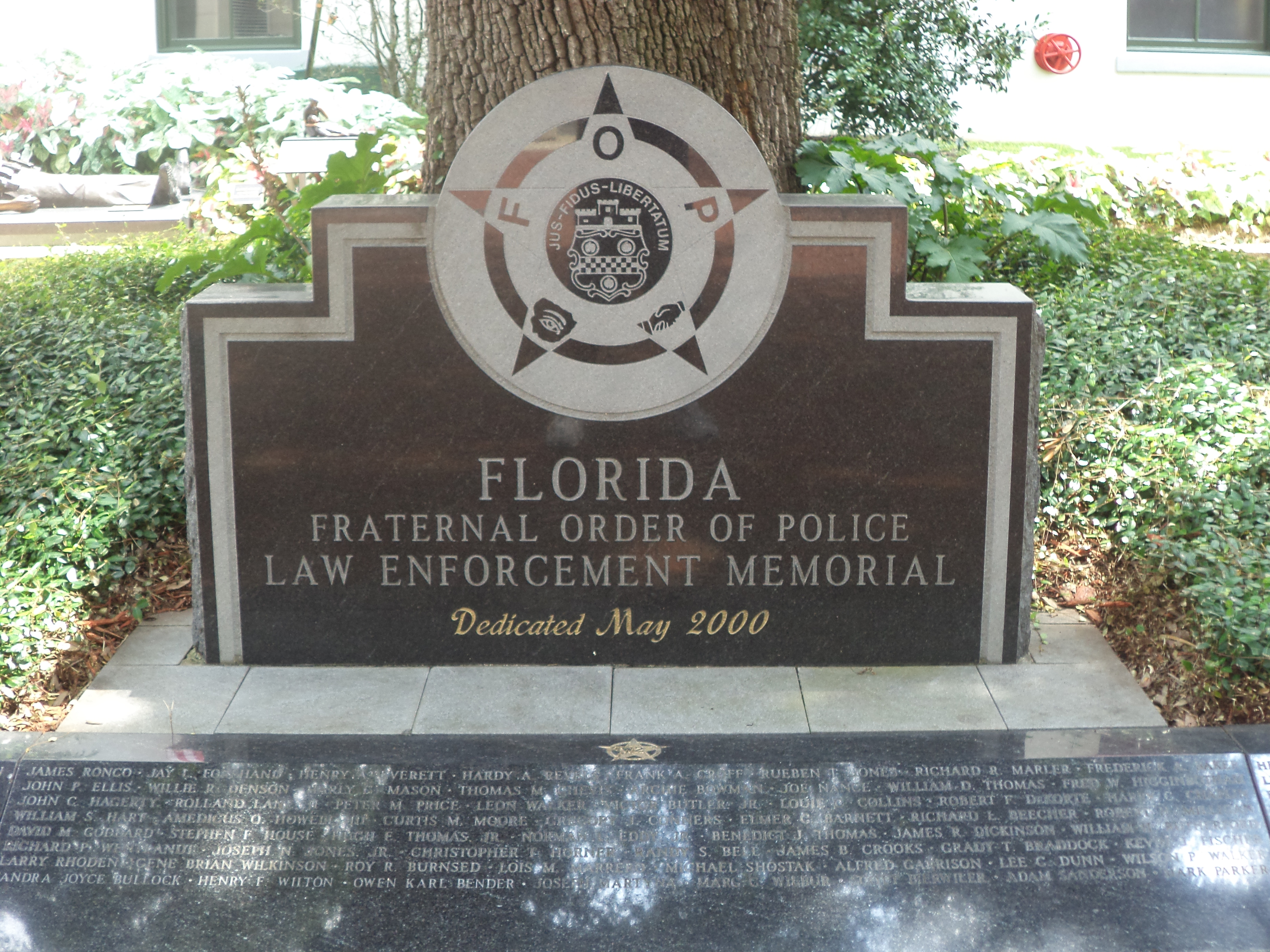
Memorial in Tallahassee, Florida

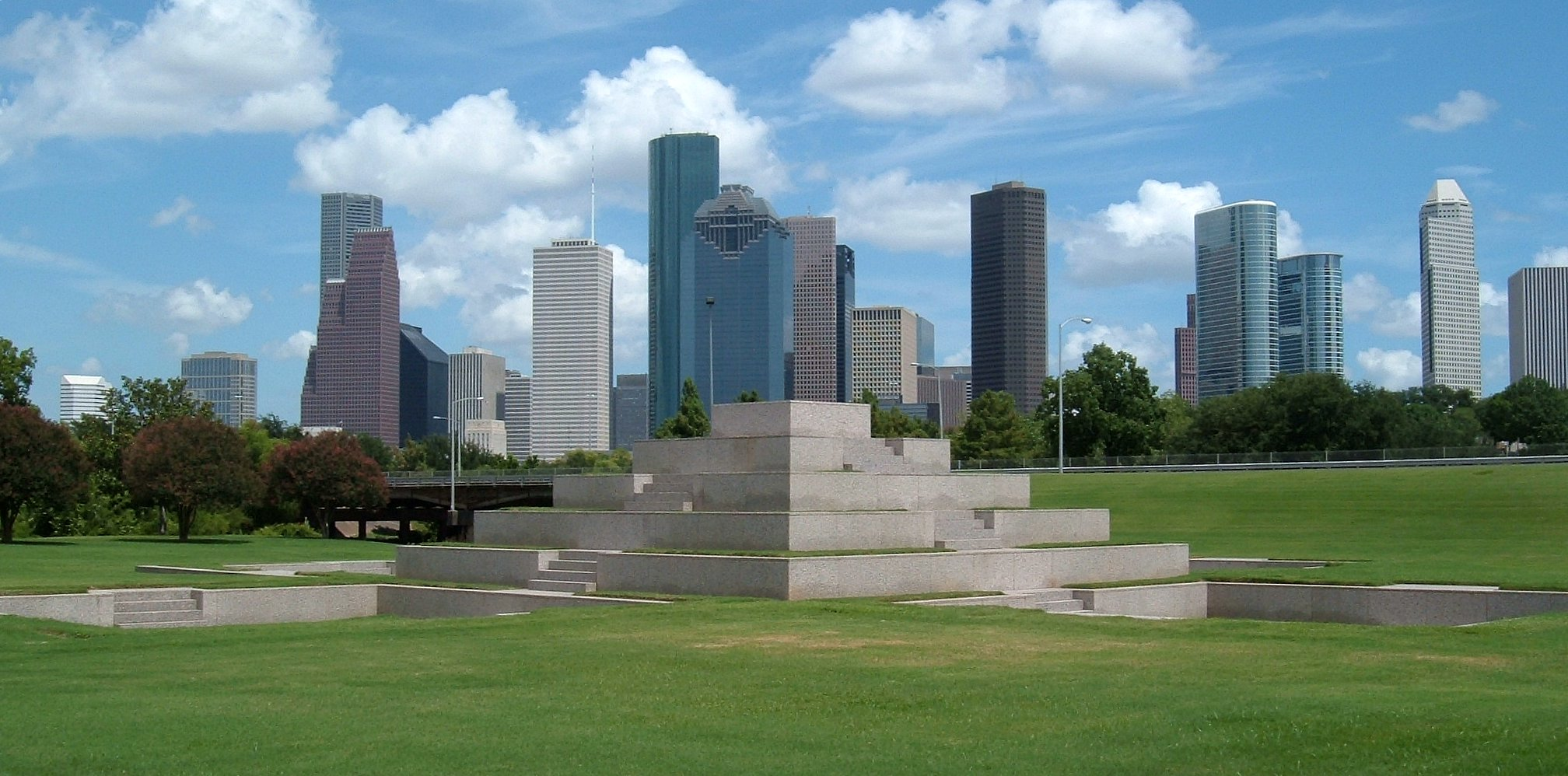
Houston Police Department memorial

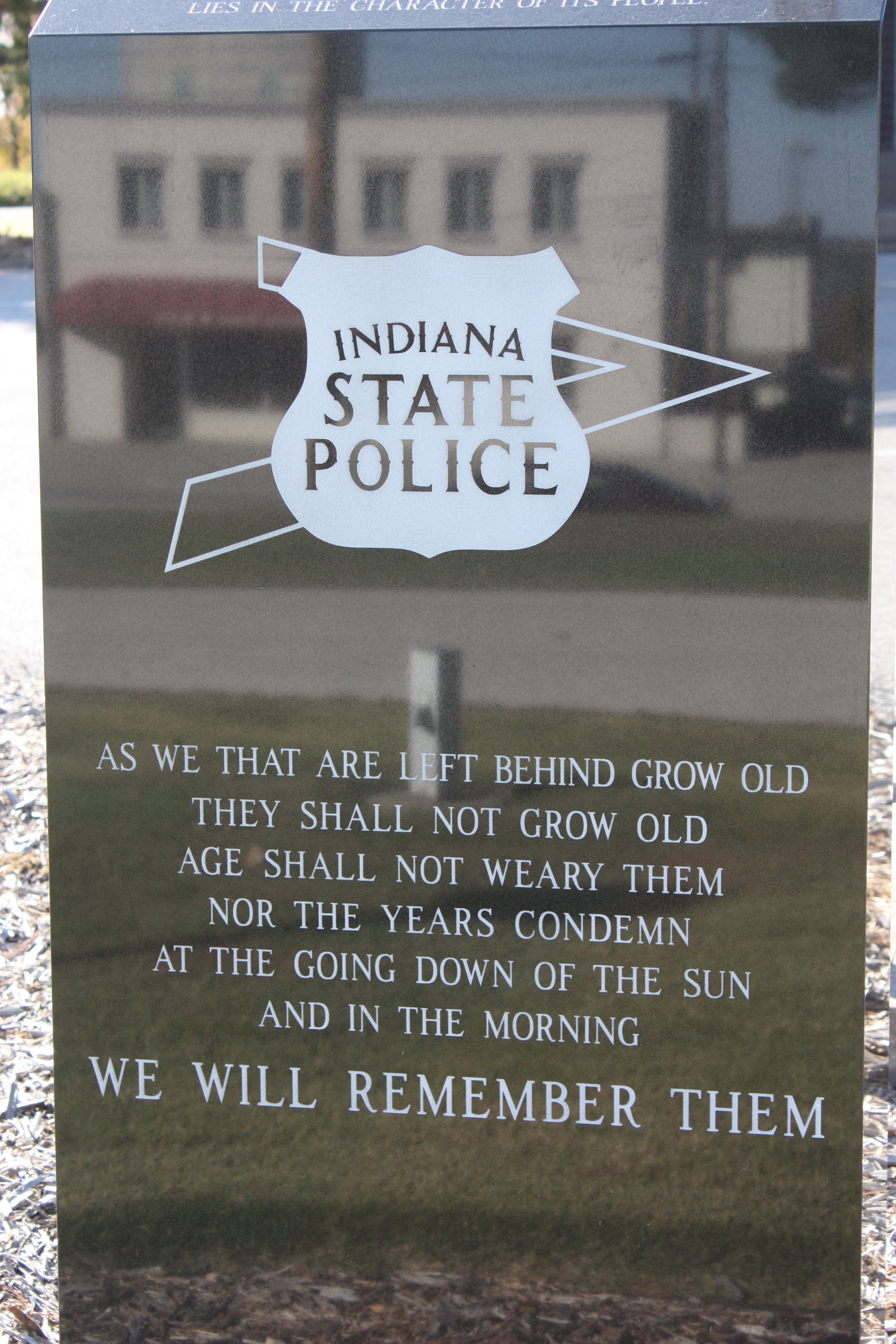
Indiana State Police memorial in Jasper

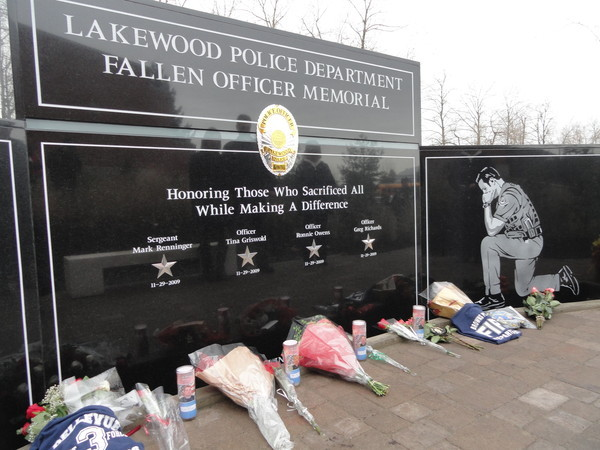
Memorial for Lakewood shooting victims

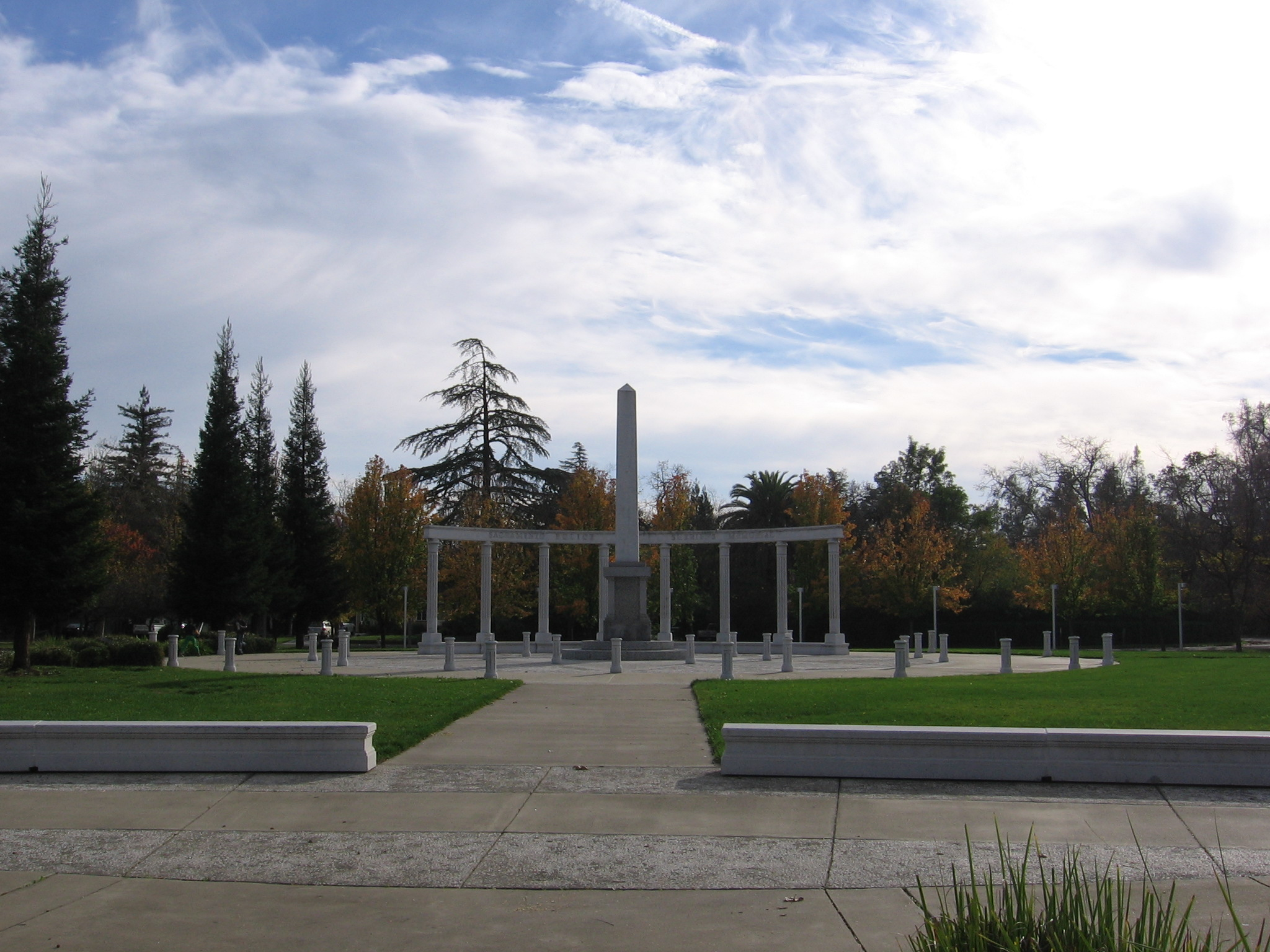
Memorial in Sacramento, California

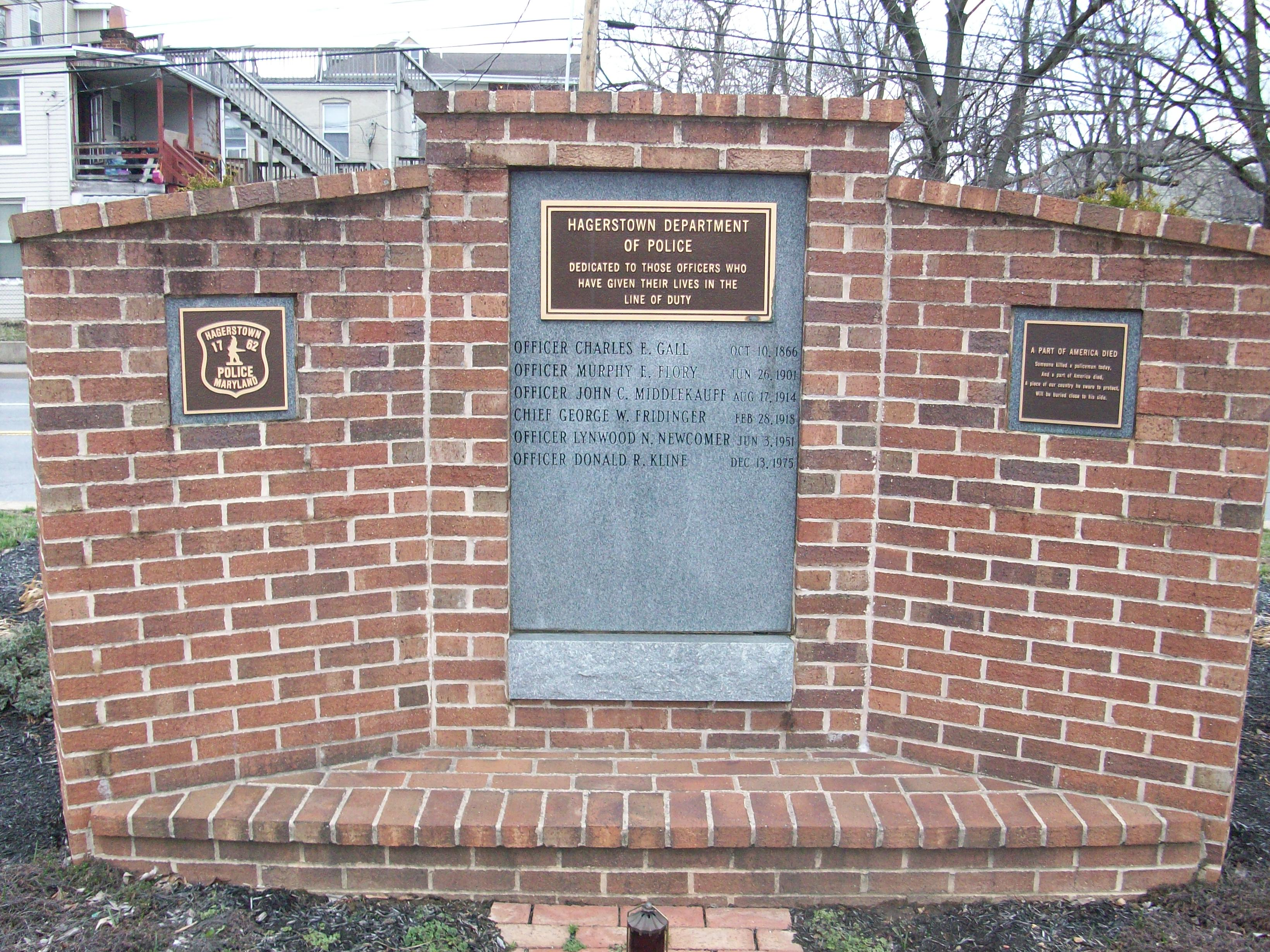
Memorial in Hagerstown, Maryland

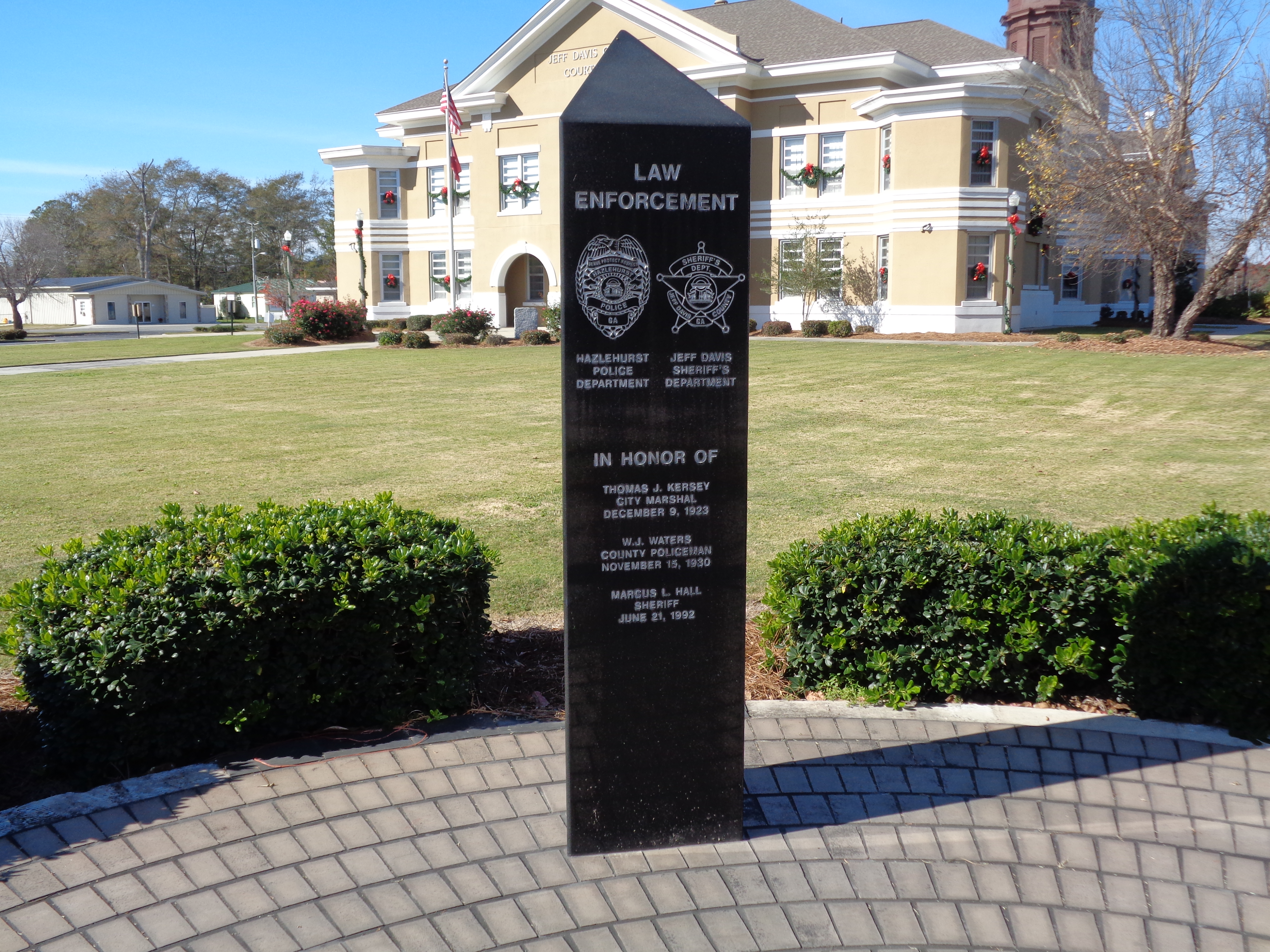
Memorial in Jeff Davis County, Georgia

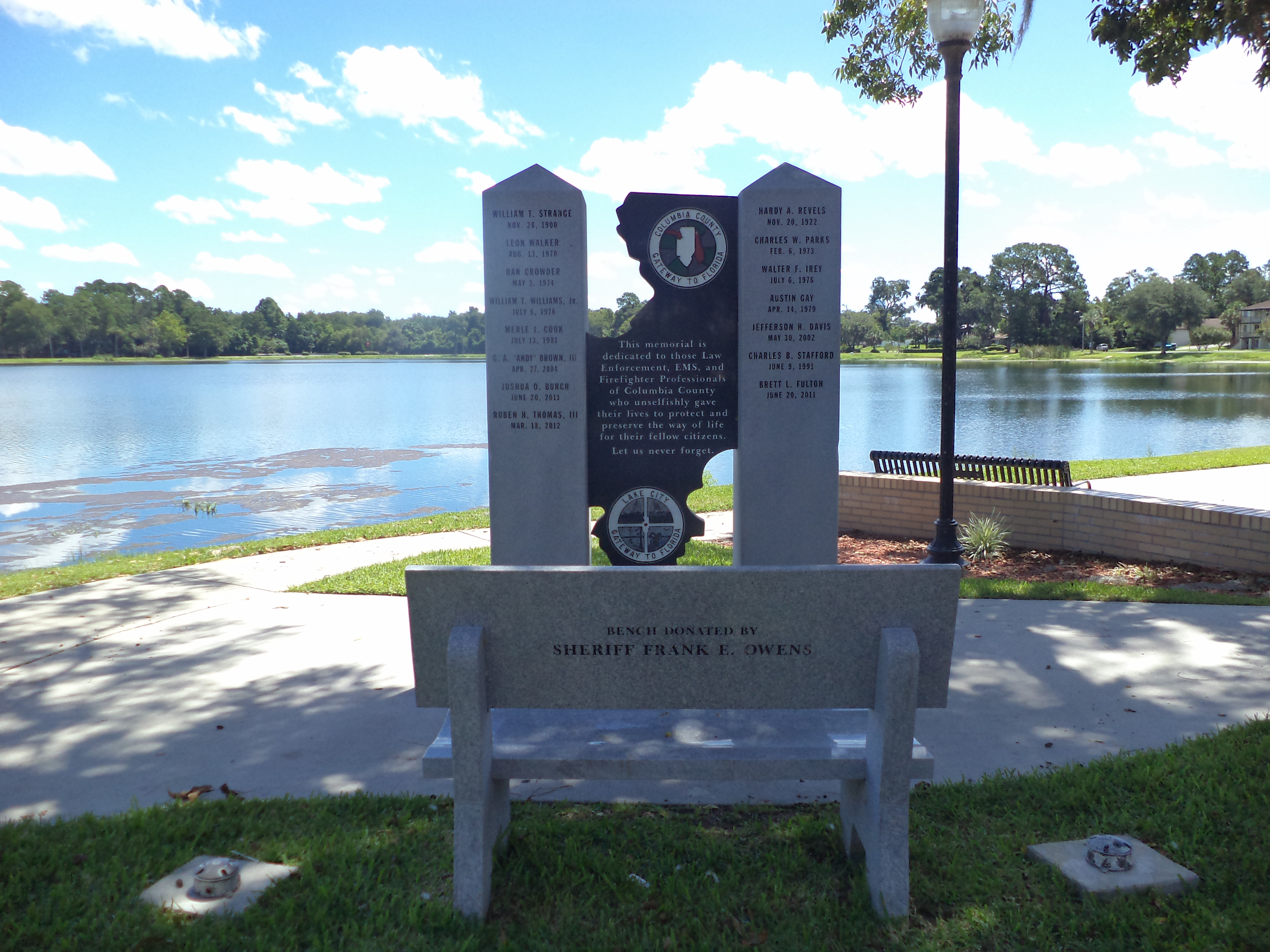
Memorial in Columbia County, Florida

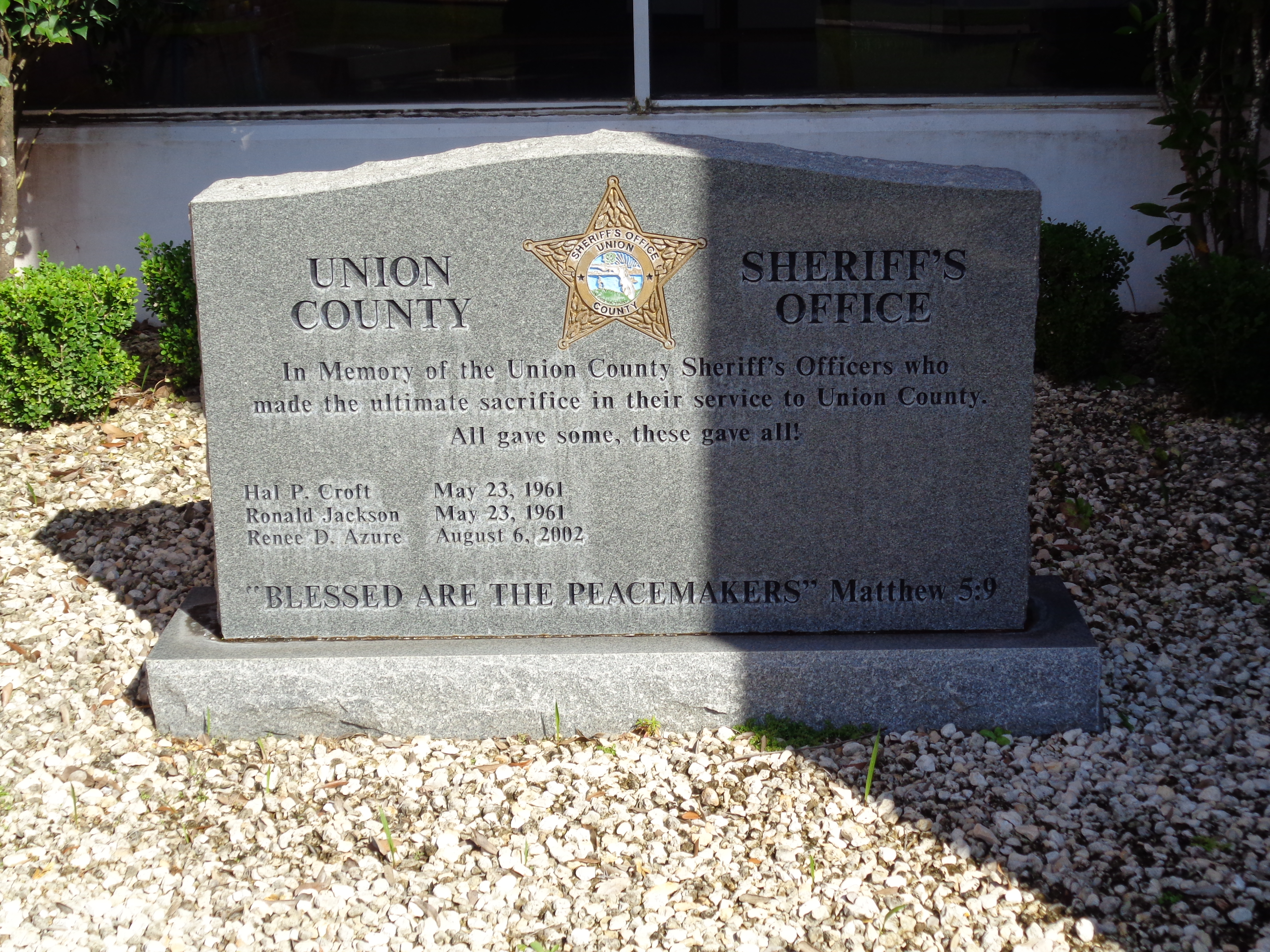
Memorial in Union County, Florida

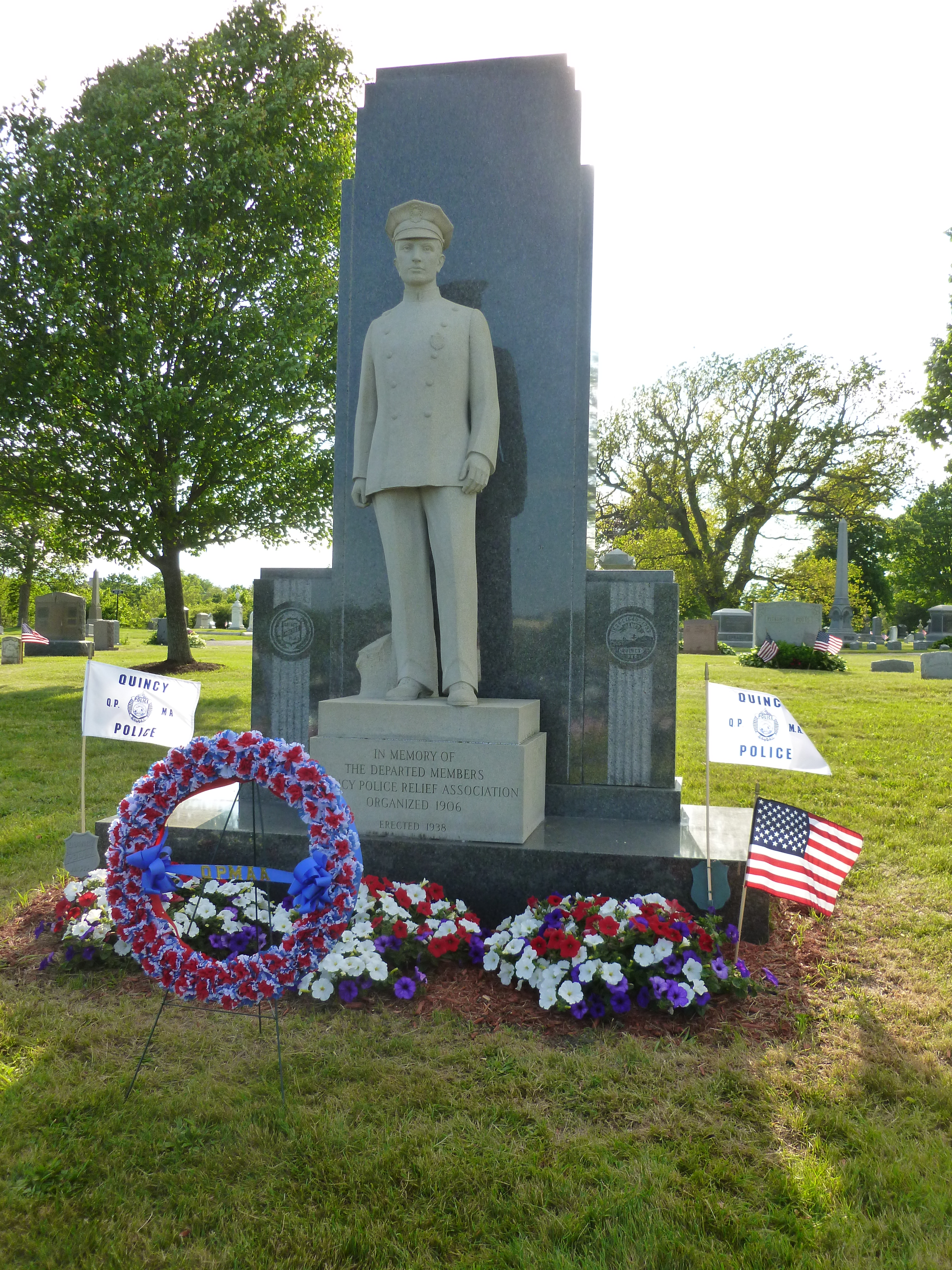
Memorial in Quincy, Massachusetts

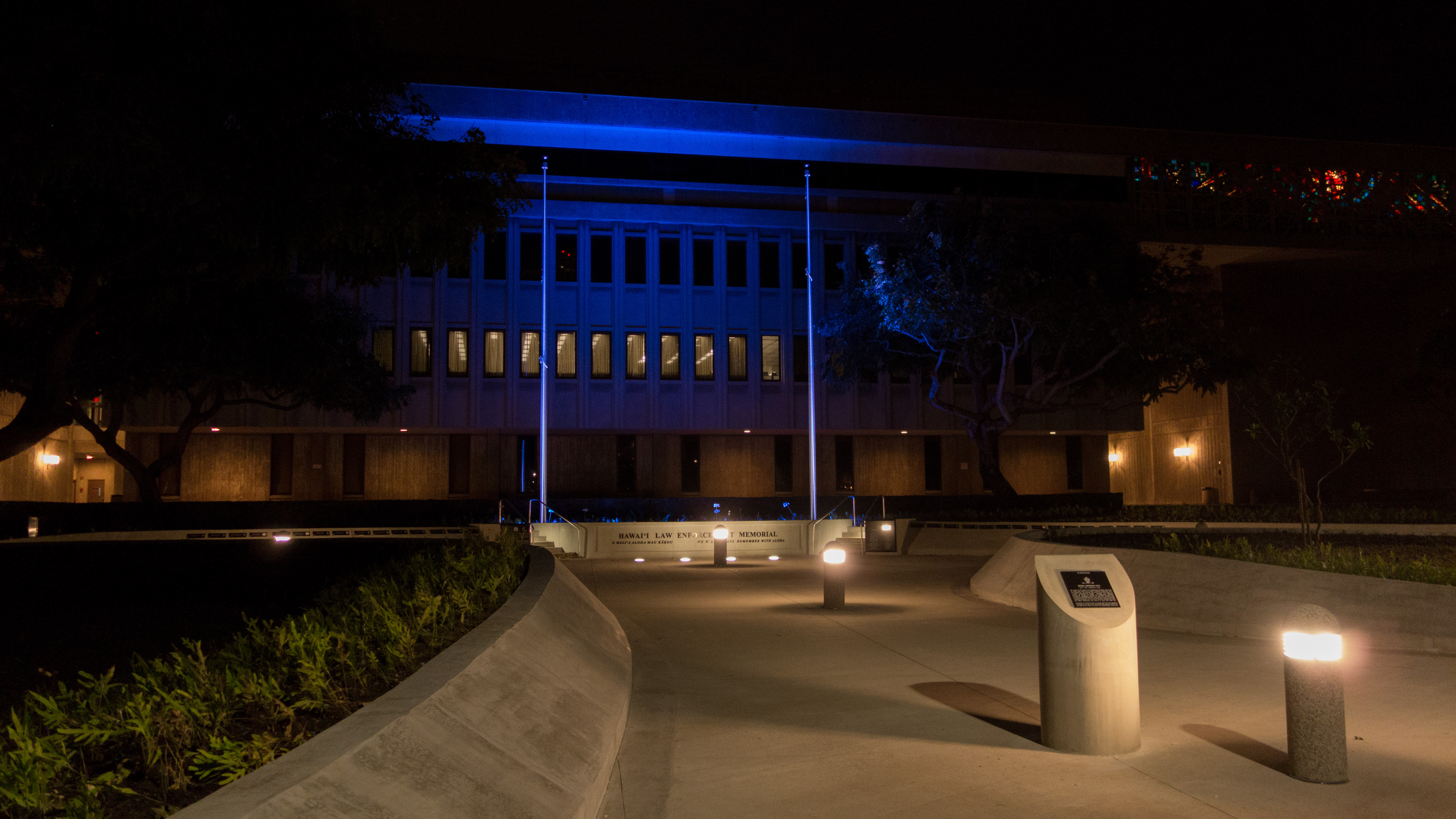
Hawaii Law Enforcement Memorial in Honolulu

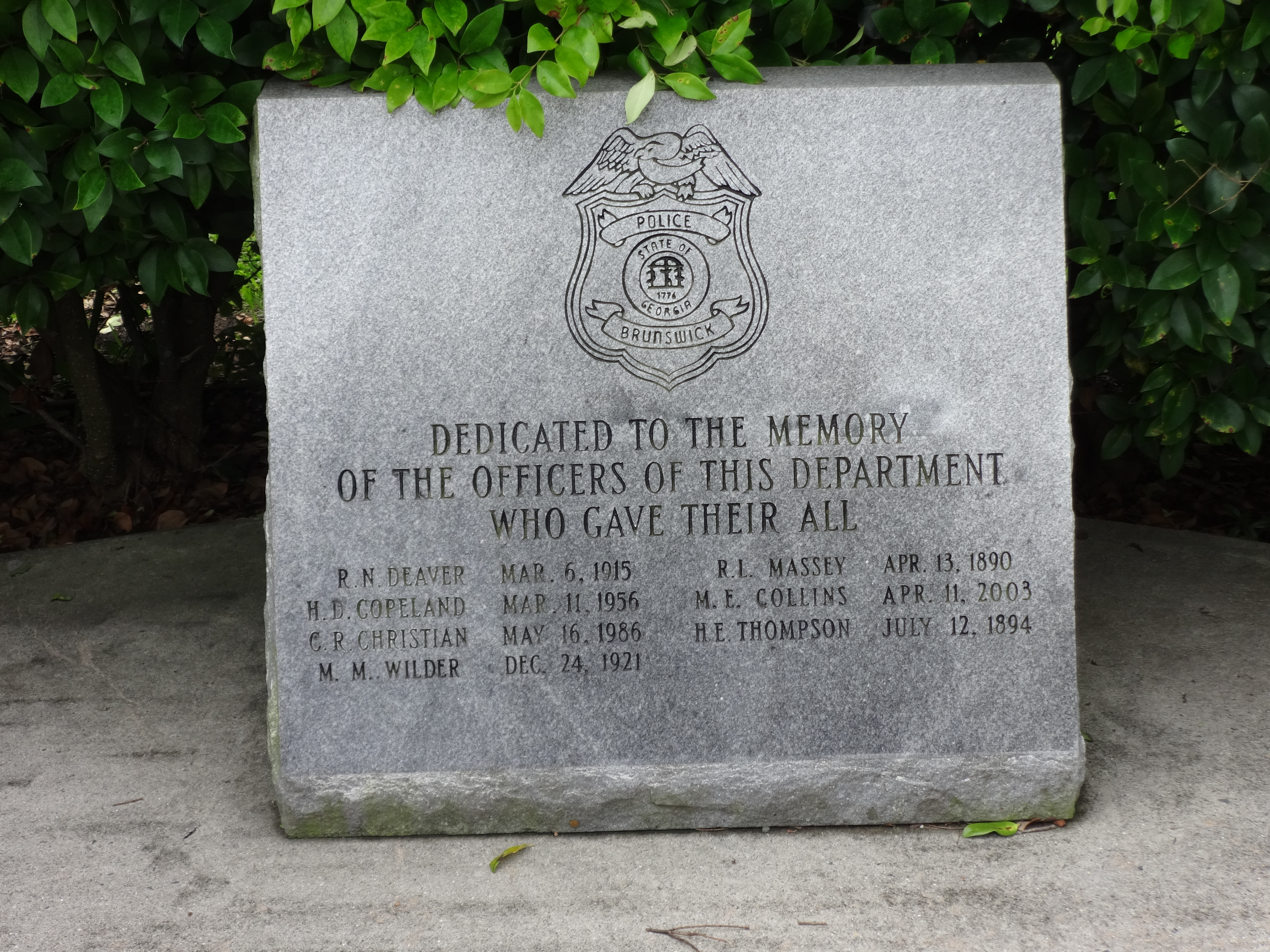
Memorial in Brunswick, Georgia

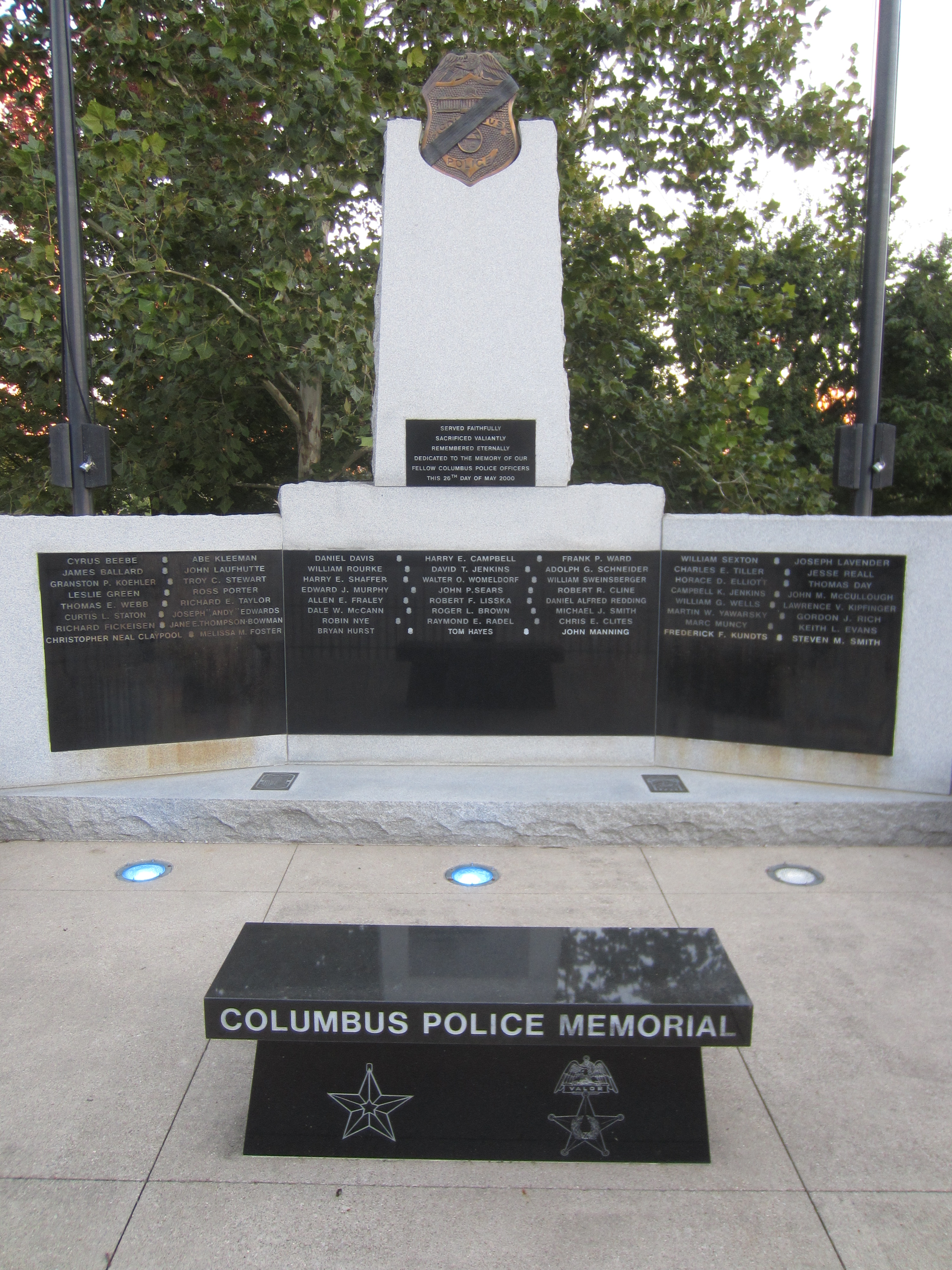
Columbus Division of Police memorial

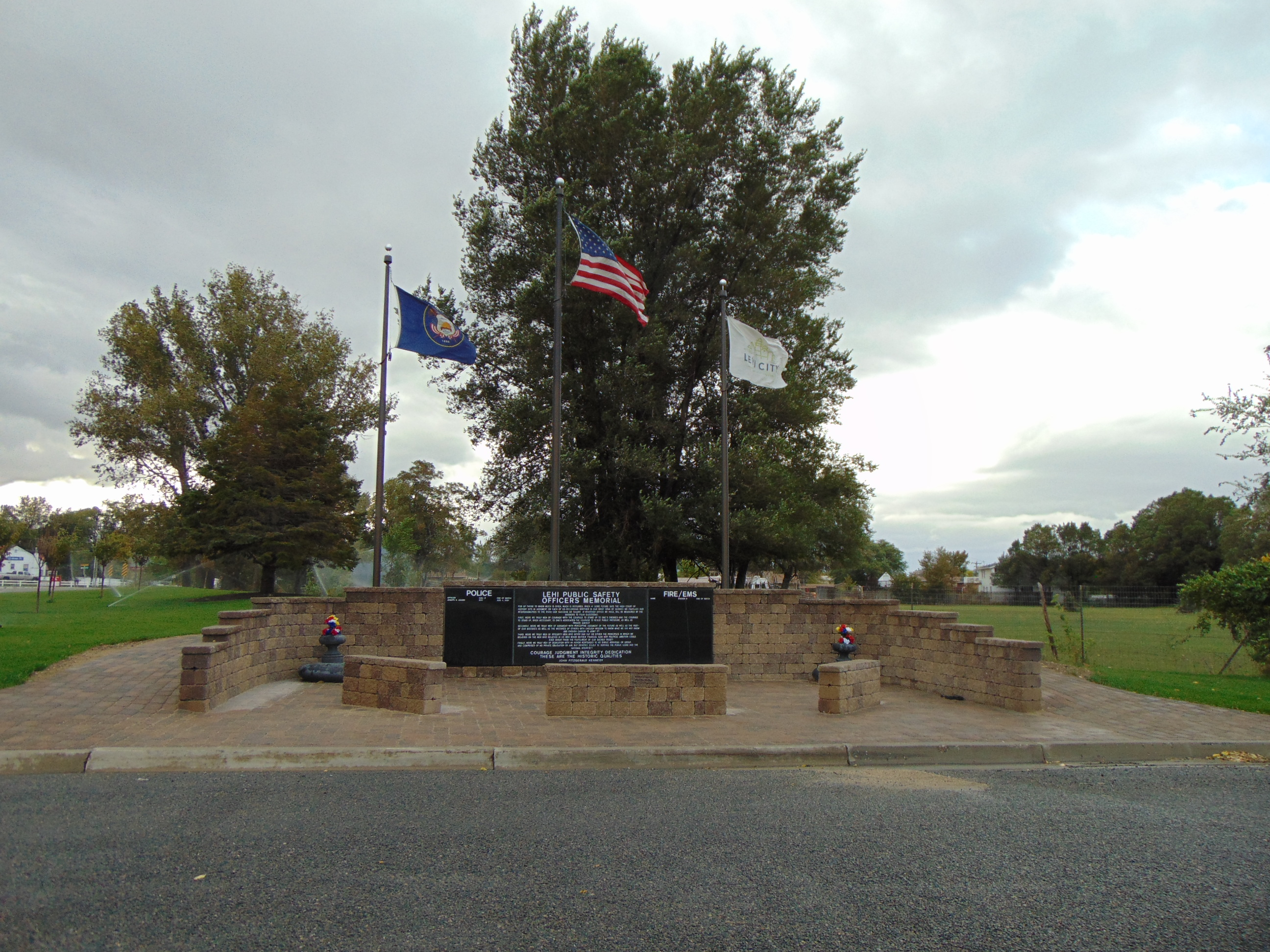
Public Safety Officers Memorial in Lehi, Utah

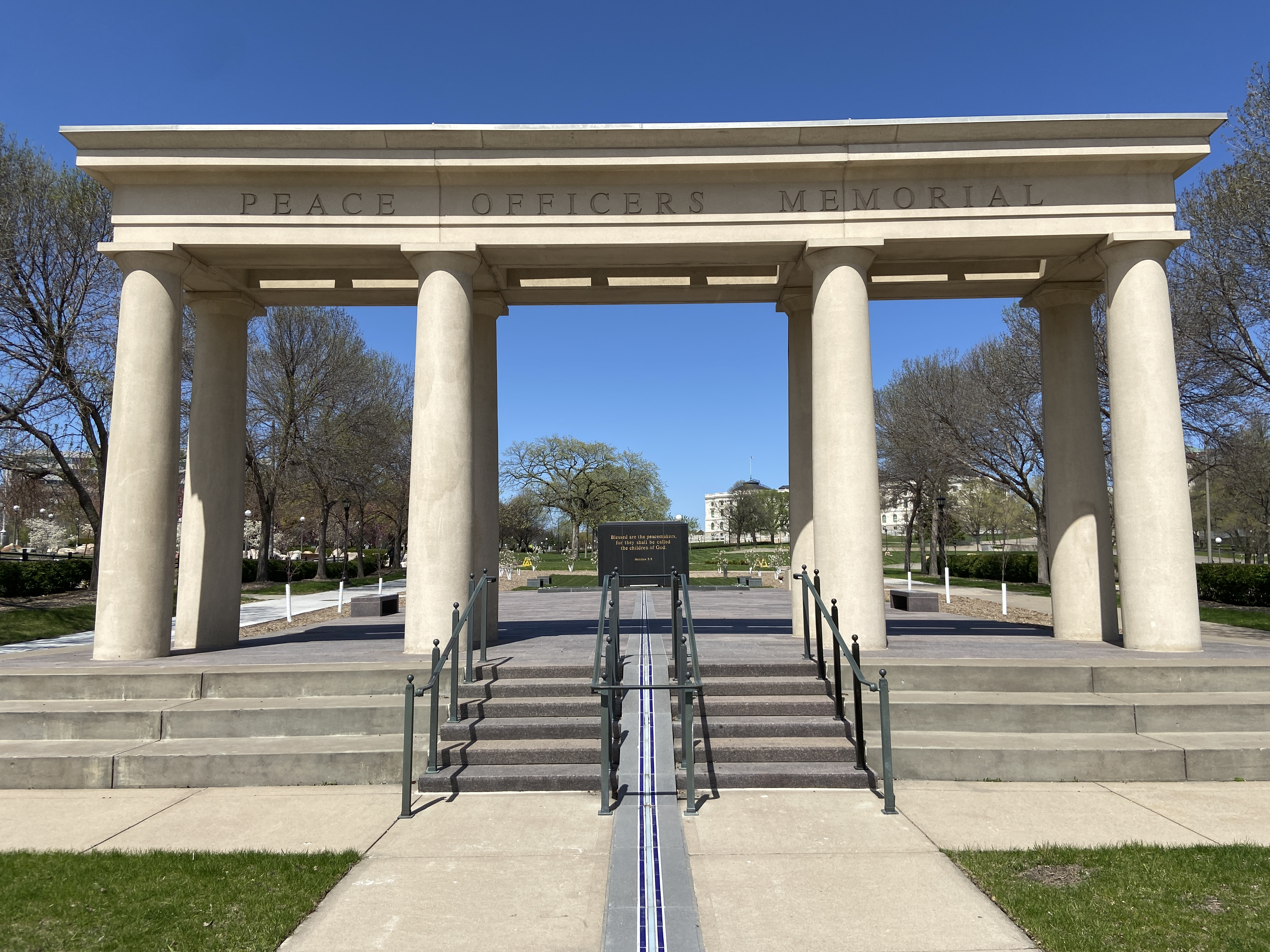
Peace Officers Memorial in St. Paul, Minnesota

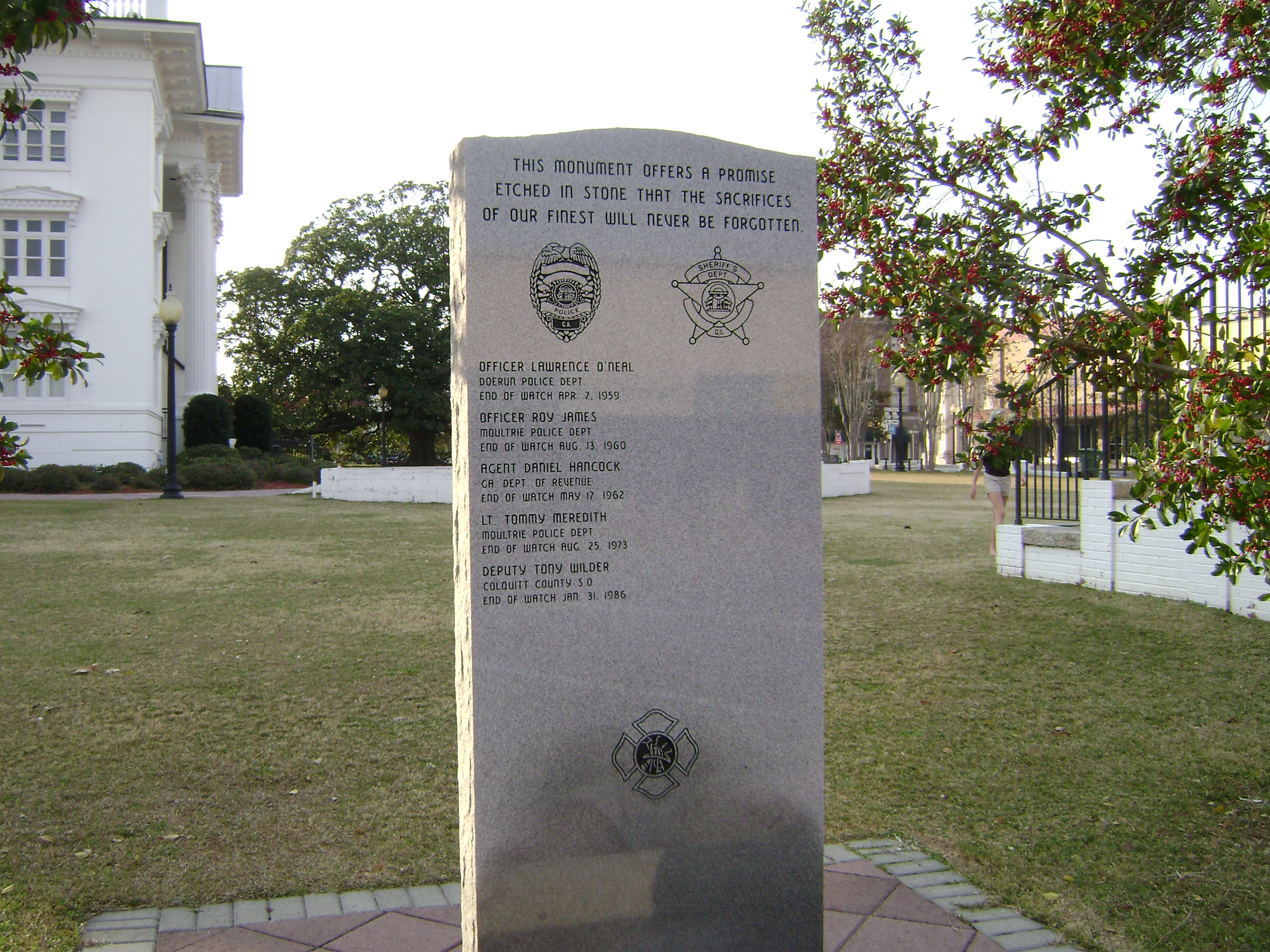
Memorial in Colquitt County, Georgia

== See also ==
- List of FBI employees killed in the line of duty
- Law enforcement in the United States
- List of firefighters killed in the line of duty in the United States

=== Other nations ===
- List of law enforcement officers killed in the line of duty in Canada
- List of British police officers killed in the line of duty
- List of Irish police officers killed in the line of duty
- List of Malaysian police officers killed in the line of duty
- List of New Zealand police officers killed in the line of duty
- List of Singapore police officers killed in the line of duty
- List of People's Armed Police personnel killed in the line of duty

=== Killings by law enforcement ===
- List of killings by law enforcement officers in the United States
- List of law enforcement officers convicted for an on-duty killing in the United States
