= 2014 Alaska State Trooper killings =

Shooting of police officers in Alaska, U.S.

2014 Alaska state trooper killings
- Location: 65°10′12″N 152°04′33″W; Tanana, Alaska, U.S.
- Date: May 1, 2014
- Weapon: Ruger Mini-14
- Deaths: 2
- Perpetrator: Nathanial Lee Kangas
- Verdict: 203 years in prison
- Convictions: First-degree murder; Third-degree assault

On May 1, 2014, two Alaska State Troopers were killed in Tanana after responding to a report of a resident brandishing a gun in an altercation over the private sale of a $150 couch. The Fairbanks-based troopers, Sergeant Patrick Scott Johnson and Trooper Gabriel Lenox Rich, had been featured in the National Geographic Channel program Alaska State Troopers. Nineteen-year-old Tanana resident Nathanial Lee Kangas was charged with two counts of first-degree murder and a single count of third-degree assault.

== Events ==
Kangas shot and killed the officers as they attempted to arrest his father, Arvin Kangas, at the family's home. Arvin Kangas, 58, was charged with assault for pointing a shotgun at the local Village Public Safety Officer (VPSO) during the incident that prompted the troopers' investigation.

== Aftermath ==
On May 5, the chairman of the Tanana Tribal Council issued a statement expressing the council's shock and grief and offering condolences to the families of the officers, stating, "We want them to know that this was the action of individuals and that this was not, and is not, Tanana." Later that week, the tribal council voted unanimously to ban the elder Kangas and another resident from the community for their indirect roles in the deaths of the officers.

Nathanial Kangas was tried in May 2016 in Fairbanks for the deaths of troopers Johnson and Rich, and was found guilty of two counts of first-degree murder, one count of third-degree assault for pointing a weapon at a VPSO, and one count of tampering with evidence. He was sentenced in November to 203 years in prison (99 for the death of each trooper, 5 for evidence tampering). Arvin Kangas was convicted in May 2015 of three counts of evidence tampering (two for altering the position of the troopers' weapons, one for disposing of marijuana plants) and was sentenced to 10 years in prison, 8 of which must be served.
