= 2025 East Los Angeles explosion =

Explosion in California, U.S.

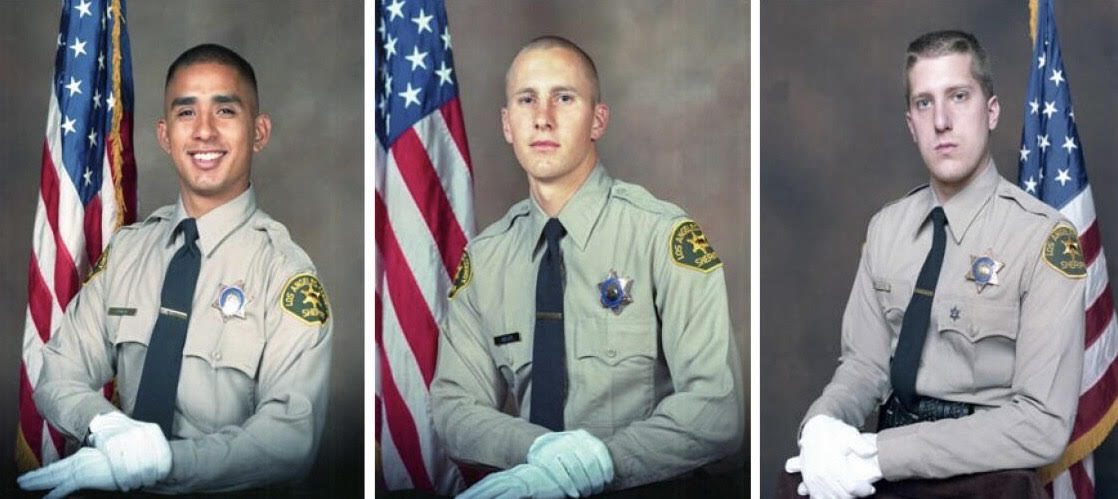
- Detectives Victor Lemus (left), Joshua Kelley-Eklund (middle) and William Osborn (right)
- Location of Biscailuz Center
- Date: July 18, 2025
- Location: Biscailuz Center, East Los Angeles, California, U.S.; 34.048963°N 118.169171°W
- Cause: Confiscated grenades
- Deaths: 3

On July 18, 2025, an explosion occurred at the Los Angeles County Sheriff's Department (LASD) Biscailuz Center training facility in East Los Angeles, California, United States. The explosion killed three police officers and is the deadliest incident for the LASD since 1857.

== Incident ==
The explosion initially occurred at 7:30 a.m. PDT on Friday, July 18, 2025. US media sources indicated that the officers were in the process of handling an unexploded ordnance during the incident when it exploded. Sheriff Robert Luna said that the grenades were originally retrieved from an apartment complex in Santa Monica, and at the time of the incident, were believed to have been inactive.

The three officers who died were a part of the arson unit and explosives units, and were in the process of disposing of them when one of them went off. Aerial cameras from the affiliate news KABC-TV showed an explosion occurring in a parking lot sheriff’s vehicles and box trucks. The surrounding area was evacuated and fenced off as investigating authorities worked at the scene, and Luna said that the area was still inaccessible to the public on Friday.

All fatalities in the incident were deputy officers, and were described as "fantastic experts" in their field. With three fatalities, the incident marked the most deaths in a single day in the history of the Los Angeles County Sheriff's Department. The incident is still under investigation.

== Victims ==
Later that day, the three deputies killed were identified as Detective Joshua Kelley‑Eklund, Detective Victor Lemus, and Detective William Osborn, all assigned to the LASD Special Enforcement Bureau's Arson‑Explosives Detail. They were seasoned veterans with a combined 74 years of service—Kelley‑Eklund (19 years), Lemus (22 years), and Osborn (33 years).

== Aftermath and later developments ==
On July 18, a search warrant was conducted at a storage unit in Santa Monica in connection with the explosion, as well as a search in Marina del Rey on July 22. Authorities found explosives linked to the training facility explosion at both locations.

One of the explosive devices recovered at the Santa Monica site later went unaccounted for and, after a search of the training facility, was determined to be missing. Authorities used X-ray technology to search for the device in the area surrounding the disaster zone, but were unsuccessful. Luna said: "You get the drift. We have looked at everything out there that we possibly could."
