= 1991 Chimayo shootings =

1991 mass shooting in New Mexico, US

- Location: Chimayo, New Mexico, U.S.
- Date: January 26, 1991
- Attack type: Mass murder
- Weapons: 7mm Magnum rifle; .38-caliber revolver; .357 Magnum revolver
- Deaths: 7
- Injuries: 1
- Perpetrator: Ricky Abeyta

On January 26, 1991, a mass shooting took place in Chimayo, New Mexico. Seven people, including an infant and two police officers, were killed before the perpetrator, 28-year-old Ricky Abeyta, surrendered to police after a one-day manhunt.

Abeyta was convicted and sentenced to life in December 1991. The crime remains the deadliest mass murder in New Mexico history.

== Background ==
Ricky Abeyta lived in the same house as his girlfriend, 36-year-old Ignacita R. Vasquez. She filed a restraining order against him and was trying to move out of the house at the time of the killings, hence the police presence.

== Shooting ==
Armed with a 7mm magnum rifle and a .38-caliber handgun, Abeyta killed his girlfriend by shooting her in the head, her daughter, her daughter's boyfriend by shooting him in the spine, her daughter's infant by shooting him in the head, and one of her relatives. His girlfriend's son was also badly wounded and hospitalized with two total bullet wounds in his chest and groin. Rio Arriba Deputy Sheriff Jerry Martinez was the first to arrive at the scene and was shot two times in the head while in his police cruiser before Abeyta then stole the Marzinez's .357 magnum revolver. New Mexico State Police Officer Glen Huber was shot in the head through the window of his car as well.

=== Victims ===
- Ignacita R. Vasquez, 36
- Maryellen Sandoval, 19
- Macario Gonzales, 19
- Justin Gonzales, 6 months
- Cheryl Rendon, 25
- Jerry Martinez, 35
- Glen Huber
- Eloy Sandoval, 13 (survived)

== Aftermath ==
After a large manhunt with up to 60 lawmen searching the area, Abeyta turned himself a day after the murders, at about 10pm.

Abeyta claimed self-defense but was convicted of four counts of first degree murder, two counts of second degree murder, and one count of involuntary manslaughter. The prosecution sought a death sentence. However, after deliberating for 11 days, the jury voted for a life sentence. In December 1991, Abeyta was sentenced to four life terms plus 36 years, the maximum for all the charges.
