= 1906 Asheville shooting =

Mass shooting in North Carolina, U.S.

- Location: Asheville, North Carolina, U.S.
- Date: November 13, 1906
- Target: Civilians
- Attack type: Mass murder, mass shooting
- Weapon: Savage 99 (.303)
- Deaths: 6 (including the perpetrator)
- Injuries: 12
- Perpetrator: Will Harris

On November 13, 1906, a mass shooting occurred in Asheville, North Carolina, United States. The perpetrator, 29-year-old Will Harris, who had arrived in Asheville the day before, fatally shot five people and injured at least twelve others with a lever-action rifle, before he went on the run.

The perpetrator, Will Harris, had previously been convicted of theft, robbery and assault in nearby Charlotte. After escaping from a chain gang of African-American felons, the city had hired its first black detective, Van Griffin, to track down Harris. Griffin apprehended Harris, sending him back to the county jail. However, Harris soon escaped, causing Griffin to send him to the state prison in Raleigh. Harris escaped a third time, breaking out by hiding in a wagon of bricks, and left Griffin’s jurisdiction for Asheville.

Following the killings, a mob of several hundred people chased Harris from his hiding place in the Biltmore Estate around midnight November 15. He took refuge in a barn near Buena Vista and was not found until he left his hiding place, carrying the same gun used in the murders. As the mob pursued him, Harris turned and fired his gun, causing hundreds of shots to be exchanged; he was killed in the resulting gunfire. Initial reports claimed that the body was not Harris's, but this was proven wrong.

At the time it was the deadliest mass shooting in North Carolina until the Carthage nursing home shooting in 2008.
