= List of mass shootings in the United States in 2024 =

Mass shootings in the contiguous United States in 2024
Mass shootings in Alaska in 2024
Mass shootings in Hawaii in 2024
Mass shootings in Puerto Rico in 2024
Mass shootings in the United States Virgin Islands in 2024

This is a list of mass shootings that took place in the United States in 2024. Mass shootings are incidents in which several people are injured or killed due to firearm-related violence, specifically for the purposes of this article, a total of four or more victims. A total of 712 people were killed and 2,389 people were wounded in 587 shootings.

== Definitions ==
Several different inclusion criteria are used; there is no generally accepted definition. Gun Violence Archive, a nonprofit research group that tracks shootings and their characteristics in the United States, defines a mass shooting as an incident in which four or more people, excluding the perpetrator(s), are shot in one location at roughly the same time. The Congressional Research Service provides a definition of four or more killed. The Washington Post and Mother Jones use similar definitions, with the latter acknowledging that their definition "is a conservative measure of the problem", as many shootings with fewer fatalities occur. The crowdsourced Mass Shooting Tracker project applies the most expansive definition: four or more shot in any incident, including the perpetrator.

A 2019 study of mass shootings published in the journal Injury Epidemiology recommended developing "a standard definition that considers both fatalities and nonfatalities to most appropriately convey the burden of mass shootings on gun violence." The authors of the study further suggested that "the definition of mass shooting should be four or more people, excluding the shooter, who are shot in a single event regardless of the motive, setting or number of deaths."

Definitions generally exclude consideration of the number of persons targeted with lethal intent, perhaps with degraded accuracy from a greater distance, who escape injury from bullets or bullet spall, regardless of injury sustained while evading live gunfire, or medical complications resulting from those injuries (such as infection, concussion, stroke, or PTSD) further down the road.

Definitions of the term "mass shooting"
Organization(s)	Definition
Mass Shooting Tracker	Four or more persons shot in one incident, at one location, at roughly the same time.
Gun Violence Archive Vox	Four or more shot in one incident, excluding the perpetrators, at one location, at roughly the same time.
Stanford University MSA Data Project	Three or more persons shot in one incident, excluding the perpetrator(s), at one location, at roughly the same time. Excluded are shootings associated with organized crime, gangs or drug wars.
ABC News	Four or more shot and killed in one incident, excluding the perpetrators, at one location, at roughly the same time.
Mother Jones	Three or more shot and killed in one incident at a public place, excluding the perpetrators. This list excludes all shootings the organization considers to be "conventionally motivated" such as all gang violence and armed robberies.
The Washington Post	Four or more shot and killed in one incident at a public place, excluding the perpetrators.
Congressional Research Service	Four or more shot and killed in one incident, excluding the perpetrators, at a public place, excluding gang-related killings and those done with a profit-motive.

Only incidents considered mass shootings by at least two of the above sources are listed below. Many incidents involving organized crime and gang violence are included. All definitions can be exceeded with a single shotgun blast into a target cluster at short range. Mass shootings do not require multiple gunshots.

For statistical purposes, armed accomplices are likely to be classified as perpetrators, even if later analysis determines that the accomplice never discharged a firearm. Bystanders struck by bullets fired in self-defense by another bystander would potentially be classified as victims of a mass shooting, while a bystander firing in self-defense who injures or kills another bystander would almost certainly not be classified as a perpetrator. The classification of a bystander struck by police while attempting to take out a believed perpetrator falls into a gray zone.

== List ==
2024 date	Location	State or territory	Dead	Injured	Total	Description
December 31	Adams County	Mississippi	1	5	6	A man was killed and five others were injured in a shooting attack south of Natchez.
December 31	Oakland (4)	California	1	3	4	A group of people were fired at in the Jack London Square area, killing a man and wounding three others.
December 30	Rochester (3)	New York	0	4	4	Three teenagers and a young adult were shot in the north side.
December 30	New York City (10)	New York	0	6	6	Six people were shot in the Williamsbridge neighborhood of The Bronx. Police allege the intended targets ran into a convenience store after they were fired at by two people in the street and that one of the targets used a woman who happened to be in the store as a human shield. The woman's 12-year-old daughter was also injured.
December 28	Signal Hill	California	1	6	7	Seven teenagers, including a girl who died, were shot at a party.
December 28	Calhoun County	West Virginia	2	2	4	South of Grantsville, two people were killed and two others were injured in a shooting at a house by the homeowner's son, who was later arrested in Fayette County.
December 28	Vacherie	Louisiana	0	7	7	Seven people were wounded outside a sports bar, three of whom were shot and four of whom suffered graze wounds. One person suffered other injuries.
December 27	North Charleston	South Carolina	4 (Note: Including the perpetrator or suspect)	0	4	A man entered the home of his estranged wife armed with a rifle and shot and killed her and two other people. Afterwards, the man kidnapped a child from the home and brought the child to his home where, upon being confronted by police, the man told the child to walk to the officers before shooting and killing himself.
December 26	Macon (2)	Georgia	1	6	7	A man was killed and six others were injured in a shooting at a home known to serve alcohol illegally.
December 25	Naranja	Florida	0	4	4	Four people were shot at a home during the evening hours.
December 25	Indianapolis (8)	Indiana	1	5	6	During an afternoon holiday gathering, a shooting that broke out left a woman dead and five others injured in the Devington neighborhood of Northeast Indianapolis.
December 24	Rossville	Maryland	1	3	4	A juvenile was killed and three others, including a suspect, were injured in a shooting that stemmed from a domestic-related incident.
December 22	Savannah (2)	Georgia	0	5	5	Five people were wounded at an establishment near the Thomas Square neighborhood.
December 21	Saint Thomas (2)	United States Virgin Islands	1	6	7	One person was killed and six injured in a shooting at a guest house.
December 21	Louisville (8)	Kentucky	2	3	5	Two men were killed and three others were injured in a late night shooting in the California neighborhood.
December 20	Oklahoma City (6)	Oklahoma	2	2	4	Officers responding to a home in the Canyon North neighborhood after they received a call from a teenager that their dad was armed with a machete and a gun and wasn't "supposed to be there" were met with gunfire as they approached the home, leaving one officer wounded. Police returned fire, killing the man, and found two teenagers inside the home suffering from gunshot wounds, with one later succumbing to their injuries at the hospital. A woman who was also inside the home was left uninjured.
December 19	Kaufman County	Texas	0	5	5	As officers attempted to break up a large fight outside North Forney High School, a Kaufman County sheriff's deputy was attacked by someone in the crowd who tried to take the officer's sidearm, causing the gun to go off, a bullet to strike the street, and scatter bullet fragments into the crowd. The Kaufman County sheriff's deputy, a Forney Independent School District resource officer, and three juveniles were struck by bullet fragments.
December 18	Mahomet	Illinois	4	0	4	A man broke into a home in Mahomet and shot and killed the three occupants, a woman and her adult children. Later the same day, the man travelled to Berwyn, where officers responded to reports of an armed man, and upon being confronted the man fled and broke into a home where he shot to death two dogs before running from the home. Officers caught up to him and after being confronted again, the man opened fire at police before being fatally shot. Far-right political commentator and streamer Nick Fuentes claimed that the man approached his door in Berwyn while he was streaming and shouted his name while armed with a handgun and crossbow.
December 17	Milpitas	California	4	0	4	A man fatally shot his wife and two children in an apartment before killing himself.
December 17	Parkville	Maryland	1	8	9	Nine people were fired upon in a minivan by four people in another vehicle before they crashed outside a funeral home, causing the vehicle to burst into flames. After the crash, one of the attackers exited their vehicle and approached the crash, continuing to fire, before getting back into their vehicle and fleeing. One of the victims was killed.
December 17	West Valley City	Utah	5	1	6	A man killed his wife and three children while critically injuring another teenager before killing himself.
December 16	Madison (2)	Wisconsin	3	6	9	Abundant Life Christian School shooting: A 15-year-old student opened fire with a handgun inside a study hall at Abundant Life Christian School, killing a teacher and another student and injuring six others before killing herself.
December 15	New Orleans (8)	Louisiana	2	2	4	Two people, including a 16-year-old, were killed and two others were injured in a shooting in the Milneburg neighborhood.
December 15	Philadelphia (15)	Pennsylvania	1	4	5	A man was killed and four others were injured in a shooting in the Feltonville neighborhood of North Philadelphia.
December 14	Shreveport (3)	Louisiana	1	3	4	A teenage boy was killed and three others were injured in a drive-by shooting during a house party.
December 14	Houston (6)	Texas	2	4	6	Two teenagers were killed and four others were injured after a male suspect opened fire during a pop-up party outside of an abandoned business in the Eastex-Jensen neighborhood of Northeast Houston.
December 14	Valencia County	New Mexico	4	0	4	South of Rio Communities, a teenage boy was arrested after killing four of his family members while intoxicated.
December 14	Aurora (2)	Colorado	3	1	4	A man fatally shot a one-year-old girl and a woman and injured another woman before killing himself at a home in the Dayton Triangle neighborhood.
December 13	Valdosta	Georgia	0	4	4	An altercation that escalated into a shooting injured four juveniles during a party.
December 10	Lake Worth Beach	Florida	3	1	4	A shooting during a Christmas party at a pub killed two men and injured two others in Downtown Lake Worth Beach. One of the injured later died.
December 8	Cicero (2)	Illinois	1	3	4	A man was killed and three women were injured when they were fired upon in a vehicle on eastbound Roosevelt Road near Cicero Avenue in Cicero. The victims fled north onto Cicero Avenue into Chicago where they crashed, leading to three others being injured in the crash.
December 7	DeKalb County (2)	Georgia	5	0	5	East of Atlanta, a suspected murder-suicide killed five people, including two children, inside an apartment complex.
December 7	Seattle (3)	Washington	0	5	5	Four men and a woman were shot at a hookah bar in the Chinatown-International District.
December 6	Mobile County	Alabama	1	6	7	A drive-by shooting killed a man and injured six juveniles during a bonfire party at an auto repair business south of Theodore.
December 5	Lafayette	Indiana	2	2	4	A man fatally shot another man and injured two others at a laundromat before mortally wounding himself. The shooter succumbed to his injuries two days later.
December 3	Kalamazoo (2)	Michigan	0	4	4	Three people were shot and another was hit by debris in a shooting in the parking lot of a Little Caesars restaurant.
December 2	Chicago (26)	Illinois	3	5	8	Three men were killed and five others were injured when gunshots broke out during a large house party in the Chicago Lawn neighborhood on the southwest side.
December 1	Red Springs	North Carolina	0	5	5	Five people were shot outside of a nightclub.
December 1	Hollywood	Florida	2	2	4	Two people were killed and two others were injured when an altercation at a parking lot venue escalated into a shooting during a baby shower in the Park East neighborhood.
December 1	New Orleans (7)	Louisiana	0	4	4	Four people were wounded in a late night shooting in the Central Business District.
November 29	Manatee County (2)	Florida	0	5	5	South of Bradenton, an argument between two men at a sports bar escalated into a shooting, injuring five. The shooter who boarded an Amtrak train headed for North Carolina was later arrested at a train station in Savannah.
November 28	San Antonio (4)	Texas	2	2	4	A man shot and killed two people and injured two others at a home he was staying at in the Eastside Promise Neighborhood the day he was meant to leave.
November 26	Jackson (3)	Tennessee	1	4	5	A two-year-old was killed and four others were injured when a suspect opened fire on them inside an SUV.
November 25	Miami	Florida	0	4	4	Four people were shot in a car in the Liberty Square neighborhood.
November 24	Venice	Illinois	0	12	12	A man was arrested and charged after shooting twelve people at a lounge.
November 24	Denver (3)	Colorado	0	4	4	Four juveniles were shot across from the Denver School of the Arts campus in the east side between the East Colfax and Park Hill neighborhoods.
November 24	St. Louis (8)	Missouri	2	3	5	A suspected argument that led to a shooting near The Dome at America's Center in the Columbus Square neighborhood killed two and injured three others.
November 21	New Orleans (6)	Louisiana	1	3	4	A suspected targeted shooting in the French Quarter neighborhood killed a woman and injured three others during the afternoon hours.
November 18	Denver (2)	Colorado	0	4	4	Four men were wounded at a strip mall in the Washington Virginia Vale neighborhood following a dispute over a work ticket in the southeast side.
November 17	Walthall County	Mississippi	1	4	5	A shooting during a social gathering killed a woman and injured four others.
November 17	New Orleans (5)	Louisiana	0	10	10	Ten people were injured in a drive-by shooting during an ongoing parade in the St. Roch neighborhood.
November 17	Columbus (5)	Ohio	0	4	4	Four people were injured in an early morning shooting near the Hungarian Village neighborhood in the south side.
November 16	Riverside	California	0	4	4	Four people were shot and two others, including the shooter, were stabbed following a fight at a street party in the La Sierra neighborhood.
November 16	Lancaster (2)	California	4	0	4	Emergency crews responding to a house fire found four people, including a teenager, fatally shot. On November 21, the suspect was arrested.
November 15	National City	California	1	4	5	During an ongoing illegal party being held at an abandoned house, a shooting that broke out killed a 12-year-old boy and injured four other men.
November 13	San Diego	California	3	1	4	A man shot and killed his ex-girlfriend and her husband inside a car in the Little Italy neighborhood of Downtown San Diego when they arrived near the courthouse to attend the restraining order hearing during the morning hours. Minutes later, he shot at the police after they located him, wounding one officer. The shooter was then killed when police fired back.
November 11	Albuquerque (2)	New Mexico	1	3	4	A man who was pointing a gun at people at a gas station in the northeast side opened fire at the police after being asked to drop the weapon. Officers then returned fire and killed the suspect. Three others were injured by police gunfire in the shootout.
November 10	Wichita (3)	Kansas	5	0	5	Five men were found dead from gunshot wounds at three different homes. Police later learned that a man killed his father, his stepfather, and his two neighbors before taking his own life.
November 10	Atlanta (6)	Georgia	0	4	4	A dispute over a firearm escalated into a shooting that injured four on the southeast side.
November 10	Tuskegee (2)	Alabama	1	12	13	Tuskegee University shooting: During the 100th homecoming week celebration at Tuskegee University, a man opened fire on campus, killing an unaffiliated teen and wounding at least twelve others, including students. Four others suffered non-gunfire-related injuries.
November 10	Laurel	Mississippi	0	5	5	Five people were injured when a man opened fire at a party center after being denied entry.
November 9	Huntsville (2)	Alabama	1	3	4	Four people, one fatally, were injured when an altercation between the two groups escalated into a shooting at a restaurant on the west side.
November 9	Lafayette	Louisiana	2	2	4	Two people were killed and two others were injured when gunfire broke out near the University of Louisiana campus during a homecoming game.
November 8	Lynchburg	Virginia	0	5	5	A shooting on the patio of a restaurant in the Sandusky neighborhood wounded five.
November 8	Mount Joy & Dauphin County	Pennsylvania	3	2	5	A man entered the apartment of a woman who had a restraining order against him and opened fire, striking three family members of the woman, one fatally. The man then kidnapped the woman and responding officers engaged in a high-speed pursuit with him into Dauphin County where he was stopped with a PIT maneuver by Pennsylvania State Police on Route 147. After being stopped, the man opened fire on police who returned fire and fatally shot him. The kidnapped woman was found dead inside the man's car, but it's unclear who shot her.
November 7	Duluth	Minnesota	5	0	5	A man went to his ex-partner's home in the Cody neighborhood and fatally shot her and their son. The man then returned to his home in the Denfield neighborhood and fatally shot his wife and their son before committing suicide.
November 7	Pittsburgh (2)	Pennsylvania	0	4	4	Three people were shot on the porch of a home in the Northview Heights neighborhood in the North Side. A fourth victim, a man, was found inside a vehicle by responding officers suffering a gunshot wound after he crashed in East Allegheny.
November 3	Stillwater	Oklahoma	0	4	4	A shooting that disrupted a homecoming party injured four.
November 3	Summit View	Washington	1	3	4	Authorities began receiving calls about a shooting at a house party shortly after midnight and responding officers found a man suffering a mortal gunshot wound on the ground outside a car crashed in a ditch near the party. Later, three other men arrived at hospitals with gunshot wounds.
November 3	Detroit (8)	Michigan	2	4	6	Two people were killed and four others were injured in the Claytown neighborhood in the city's west side.
November 2	Cecil County	Maryland	2	2	4	Two people were killed and two others were injured in an early morning shooting north of Elkton.
November 2	Reno	Nevada	1	3	4	One person was killed and three others were injured outside of a tavern in Midtown Reno.
November 1	Northglenn	Colorado	3	3	6	An argument that sparked into a gunfight killed three people and injured three others at a Halloween house party.
November 1	New Haven (2)	Connecticut	0	4	4	Four people, including two teenagers, were injured in a shooting in Downtown New Haven in which counterfeit bills were found strewn around the scene of the attack.
November 1	Orlando (2)	Florida	2	7	9	2024 Orlando Halloween shooting: Two men were killed and seven others were wounded when a suspect, a 17-year-old boy, opened fire in Downtown Orlando during Halloween festivities. One woman was hospitalized after she was trampled by people fleeing the shooting.
October 31	Wilmington	Delaware	1	3	4	A man was killed and three other men were injured in a shooting in northeastern Wilmington.
October 30	Pasco County (2)	Florida	0	4	4	Four people were injured after a fight between two neighbors escalated into a shooting north of Zephyrhills.
October 28	Memphis (10)	Tennessee	0	5	5	Five men were injured when a man opened fire at an apartment complex in the southeast side.
October 27	Clarksdale (2)	Mississippi	1	3	4	A man was killed and three others were injured in a shooting during the evening.
October 27	Kalamazoo (1)	Michigan	0	6	6	Six people were shot at a former laundromat being used to host a party after an argument broke out. One of the victims returned fire.
October 27	Bella Vista	California	1	5	6	A teenager was killed and five others were injured in a shooting at a Halloween house party.
October 27	Corpus Christi (3)	Texas	2	2	4	Two people were killed and two others were injured after a fight in a parking lot escalated into a shooting in the Southside neighborhood.
October 27	Corpus Christi (2)	Texas	0	5	5	A fight at a party escalated into a shooting that wounded five men, including two teenagers.
October 26	Union Springs	Alabama	2	3	5	Two teenagers were killed and three others were injured in an overnight shooting.
October 26	Durham (2)	North Carolina	0	4	4	A shooting which injured no one on the North Carolina Central University campus during a homecoming celebration led to a lockdown and a sweep of the campus by police officers. During the sweep, another shooting happened on campus, unrelated to the first shooting, in which four people, including one student, were injured.
October 26	Fresno (2)	California	0	6	6	Six men were shot in the Mural District of Downtown Fresno.
October 26	McKees Rocks	Pennsylvania	1	3	4	A man was killed and three others were injured when at least two people opened fire.
October 24	Waco	Texas	0	4	4	A late night shooting injured four people in the Brook Oaks neighborhood.
October 23	Montgomery (4)	Alabama	1	4	5	Five people, including two children, were injured in a shooting at an apartment complex in southeast Montgomery. One of the wounded died six days later.
October 21	King County	Washington	5	1	6	A 15-year-old boy fatally shot three of his siblings and his parents at their home west of Snoqualmie. One of his sisters survived by playing dead after being shot before escaping through a window.
October 20	Jackson (2)	Tennessee	1	8	9	One person was killed and eight others were injured in a shooting at a party.
October 20	Baton Rouge (3)	Louisiana	1	5	6	A shooting in a parking lot of a nightclub hosting a concert killed a man and injured five others.
October 19	Fort Wayne (2)	Indiana	1	9	10	Nine people, mostly teenagers, were injured when a teenager opened fire at a high school party after being refused entry. One of the injured returned fire, killing the shooter.
October 19	Albany (3)	Georgia	1	4	5	A teenager was killed and four others, including a teenage girl, were injured in a shooting on the campus of Albany State University during a homecoming celebration.
October 19	Holmes County	Mississippi	3	8	11	During a celebration at an outdoor trail north of Lexington following a high school football game, an argument between two young men escalated, killing three, including two teenagers, and injuring eight others.
October 19	Philadelphia (14)	Pennsylvania	0	7	7	An argument at an 'Instagram' party escalated into a shooting that left seven people injured, including a teenage girl, near Fotterall Square in the Hartranft neighborhood in the city's north side.
October 14	Detroit (7)	Michigan	1	3	4	An argument among a group of men in the MorningSide neighborhood on the city's east side escalated into a shooting that killed one and injured three others.
October 12	Elbert County	Georgia	1	7	8	A teenager was killed and seven others, mostly other teenagers, were injured in a shooting at a nightclub near Elberton.
October 12	East Cleveland	Ohio	1	4	5	One person was killed and four others were injured after an altercation at an unauthorized bar escalated.
October 12	Nashville (7)	Tennessee	1	9	10	One person was killed and nine others were injured when two groups exchanged gunfire near Tennessee State University's homecoming game.
October 12	Oklahoma City (5)	Oklahoma	1	14	15	An argument at a Halloween party that escalated into a shooting killed a person and wounded fourteen others in the city's southwest side.
October 11	Newberry	South Carolina	0	4	4	Four people were injured in a shooting at a private party.
October 9	Kansas City (8)	Missouri	0	5	5	Four adult men and one teenage male were shot in the Westport area.
October 6	Fort Worth (3)	Texas	1	4	5	A teenager was killed in a shooting in the North Side neighborhood while out celebrating his birthday. Four others were injured.
October 5	Oklahoma City (4)	Oklahoma	0	4	4	An argument that escalated into a shooting injured four people in the Bricktown area of Downtown Oklahoma City.
October 4	Redding	California	2	3	5	Two men were killed and three others were injured in a shooting at a shopping center overnight in the Westwood neighborhood.
September 29	Houston (5)	Texas	0	4	4	Four people, including a security guard, were injured when a fight escalated into a shooting at a nightclub in the Briarmeadow neighborhood.
September 29	Gresham Park	Georgia	1	3	4	An apparent dispute over a choice in music led to an attempted robbery and a shooting that killed a man and injured three other men.
September 29	Danville	Virginia	1	3	4	A man was killed and three others were injured in an early morning shooting at a restaurant.
September 28	Henderson	North Carolina	0	5	5	A fight during a party at a venue escalated into a shooting when two people opened fire on each other, striking five.
September 28	Washington (13)	District of Columbia	1	3	4	A man was killed and three others were injured in the Woodland neighborhood of Southeast DC.
September 27	Merrydale	Louisiana	3	2 (Note: Including at least one of the perpetrators)	5	A dispute led to two teenagers opening fire outside an apartment complex, killing three people. One of the victims returned fire and wounded both suspects.
September 27	Shreveport (2)	Louisiana	0	4	4	A man opened fire with a rifle at a gathering at an apartment complex in the Mooretown neighborhood, wounding four, including a baby.
September 27	Spartanburg County	South Carolina	3	1	4	Four people were shot, three fatally, over a dispute over who had the rights to hunt on a particular piece of land south of Woodruff.
September 26	Chicago (25)	Illinois	0	4	4	Multiple shooters from a vehicle opened fire at a group of men walking, wounding four near a music studio in the Irving Park neighborhood on the northwest side.
September 25	Los Angeles (5)	California	0	6	6	Three people opened fire in the Vermont Knolls neighborhood of South Los Angeles, wounding six.
September 21	Chicago (24)	Illinois	1	6	7	During a prayer vigil at a home, a person pulled up in their vehicle in front of the residence and then opened fire, killing a man and injuring six others in the Little Village neighborhood on the city's west side.
September 21	Birmingham (6)	Alabama	4	17	21	September 2024 Birmingham shooting: Four people were killed and seventeen others were wounded when multiple people drove up to a hookah bar and exited their vehicles to open fire on a line of queued people in what is suspected to be a murder-for-hire motivated attack.
September 21	New York City (9)	New York	0	6	6	Six people were shot near the border of the Greenpoint and East Williamsburg neighborhoods in Brooklyn.
September 21	Minneapolis (6)	Minnesota	2	3	5	Two men were killed and three others, including two teenage girls, were injured in a shooting following a fight in the Downtown West area.
September 20	Philadelphia (13)	Pennsylvania	1	3	4	One person was killed and three others were injured in the Elmwood Park neighborhood on the southwest side.
September 20	Phoenix	Arizona	1	3	4	A teenage boy was killed and three others, including two other teenagers, were wounded in the area between the Garfield and Eastlake Park neighborhoods of Central Phoenix.
September 18	Minneapolis (5)	Minnesota	2	3	5	Two people were killed and three injured in a series of shootings at homeless camps. A Native Mob member was arrested for the shootings.
September 18	St. Louis (7)	Missouri	3	1	4	An exchange of fire between two people in the Academy neighborhood in North St. Louis killed three people and wounded one other person.
September 16	Chicago (23)	Illinois	0	4	4	Four people, including a 13-year-old girl, were wounded when shots were fired into a fitness studio in the Back of the Yards neighborhood on the city's south side.
September 15	St. Louis County	Missouri	0	4	4	Four men were shot in a neighborhood north of Florissant.
September 15	New York City (8)	New York	0	4	4	Several NYPD officers fired shots into a crowd at an allegedly knife-wielding fare evader at the Sutter Avenue station in Brooklyn, striking the suspect, one officer, and two bystanders. Footage later revealed the fare evader was standing still with his arms by his side when police opened fire.
September 14	Selma	Alabama	0	4	4	Four people were wounded on the city's east side.
September 14	Louisville (7)	Kentucky	0	4	4	Four men were shot at a gas station in the Portland neighborhood on the city's northeast side.
September 14	Houston (4)	Texas	3	8	11	A drive-by shooting during a block party in the Houston Gardens neighborhood on the city's northeast side killed three and injured eight during the early morning hours.
September 13	Alexandria (2)	Louisiana	2	2	4	A man shot three relatives, killing one, before taking his own life at the nail salon he owned.
September 13	Nashville (6)	Tennessee	3	1	4	Three men were fatally shot at a home in the Colemont neighborhood. A bicyclist who was riding by at the time of the killings was shot in the hip by a stray bullet.
September 12	Cleveland (4)	Ohio	2	2	4	A man arrived at a home in the Old Brooklyn neighborhood and began arguing with a woman who he fatally shot before injuring two others. The man then fled the scene and was chased by police before he committed suicide.
September 12	Suffolk	Virginia	2	3	5	Two men were killed and three others were injured at a business.
September 7	Amarillo	Texas	4	0	4	A man killed his wife and two children before turning the gun on himself.
September 7	Miami Gardens (2)	Florida	0	5	5	An argument between two people at a fraternity center for Florida Memorial University escalated into a shooting that wounded five.
September 7	Ellport	Pennsylvania	1	4	5	A man returned to a bar after being asked to leave and opened fire before driving down the road and firing into several other homes and businesses before he was arrested. One woman was killed and four others were injured.
September 7	Laurel County	Kentucky	1	5	6	Interstate 75 Kentucky shooting: A man opened fire on the northbound and southbound lanes of Interstate 75 near exit 49 northwest of London from a cliff ledge, striking twelve vehicles and wounding five people, before fleeing the scene and prompting a manhunt and causing multiple schools, businesses, and churches to close in the county and surrounding counties. Three others were injured as a result of vehicular accidents caused by the attack. Police said they found the suspect dead close by on September 18.
September 6	Washington (12)	District of Columbia	0	5	5	Five people were shot in the Washington Highlands neighborhood of Southeast DC.
September 5	Saraland	Alabama	0	4	4	At least two people driving on Interstate 65 in Saraland opened fire on each other, resulting in three people being wounded in one vehicle and a fourth being injured in the other.
September 5	Milwaukee (8)	Wisconsin	0	4	4	Three police officers were shot and injured attempting trying to serve a warrant at an apartment building near Timmerman Airport. The suspect, who was also shot, was later arrested.
September 4	Barrow County	Georgia	4	7	11	2024 Apalachee High School shooting: A student opened fire at Apalachee High School, located southwest of Winder, killing two students and two teachers, and wounding six other students and another teacher. Two other students sustained non-gunshot injuries. The shooter surrendered immediately upon being confronted by responding police. He was charged with four counts of felony murder. The father, who gave him the weapon, was charged with four counts of involuntary manslaughter, two counts of second degree murder, and eight counts of cruelty to children.
September 3	West Haven	Utah	4	0	4	A woman and her three children were found dead inside a vehicle after police responded to a report of a suspected homicide near the house. Officials later stated the woman had killed the three children and herself.
September 2	Newark	New Jersey	0	4	4	A man stole a car from East Orange and then drove to the Clinton Hill neighborhood of Newark where he opened fire, striking four people. The stolen vehicle was later found on fire in the south part of the neighborhood.
September 2	Bessemer	Alabama	0	4	4	A shooting during a candlelight vigil for a fatal shooting that killed three men at a Citgo gas station injured four people.
September 2	Seattle (2), Federal Way, Tukwila, & Fife	Washington	0	5	5	A man went on a shooting spree along Interstate 5 across King and Pierce counties, wounding five in six different shooting attacks in a two and a half hour timespan.
September 2	Birmingham (5)	Alabama	1	3	4	One person was killed and three others were injured when someone broke down the door of the apartment they were playing cards in and opened fire in the Titusville neighborhood. The attack was believed to be robbery-motivated.
September 2	New York City (7)	New York	1	4	5	During the annual West Indian Day Parade, a dispute escalated into a shooting that left five people wounded in the Crown Heights neighborhood of Brooklyn. One of the wounded later died.
September 2	Nashville (5)	Tennessee	0	5	5	Five people were injured in a late night shooting at a nightclub in the Antioch neighborhood on the city's southeast side.
September 2	Oak Park	Illinois	4	0	4	Four people were fatally shot on a Blue Line train between Oak Park and Harlem stations in the Oak Park area. The suspect was later located and arrested at the California station on the Pink Line in Chicago. The attack caused the Blue Line to be shut down between the Forest Park and Austin stations.
September 1	St. Louis (6)	Missouri	0	5	5	Five people were injured in a shooting in Downtown West. One woman suffered a gunshot wound while four others suffered wounds from bullet fragments.
September 1	Bullard	Texas	3	1	4	A mother and her three children were shot at their home. A baby survived with a severe gunshot wound to the face.
September 1	Cleveland (3)	Ohio	0	4	4	Four people were shot in the east side during a dispute over stolen property.
September 1	Milford	Delaware	0	4	4	Police responding to reports of shots fired found four people suffering from gunshot wounds.
September 1	Dayton (3)	Ohio	0	4	4	Four people were injured in an early morning shooting.
September 1	New Orleans (4)	Louisiana	1	4	5	Following a fight at a bar, a group of five women were driving away when they were fired upon in Mid-City, causing a roll-over crash. One woman was killed and the four others were injured.
August 31	Waianae (2)	Hawaii	4	2	6	A man rammed his tractor into several vehicles outside his neighbor's residence where a party was being held, then shot into the tractor's fuel drums and into the home's carport and at fleeing partygoers, killing three and injuring two others, before he was fatally shot by the homeowner.
August 31	Albuquerque (1)	New Mexico	4	0	4	Four people at an apartment were drinking together throughout the day in the Near North Valley area. During the late evening an argument escalated into a shooting in which a man shot and killed the three he had been drinking with before fatally shooting himself.
August 30	Euclid (2)	Ohio	1	4	5	A teenager was killed and four other teenagers were injured in a shooting near the campus of Euclid High School following a high school football game.
August 30	Burnsville (2)	Minnesota	0	5	5	Five teenagers were shot in a sports park during the evening hours.
August 29	Dallas (6)	Texas	2	2	4	A man sought out a police officer and fatally shot him as he sat in his patrol car in a parking lot in Cedar Crest (near Oak Cliff). Officers responded after hearing gunshots over the fallen officer's radio and were fired upon by the man, with two officers being struck by gunfire. The man then fled north along Interstate 35E before he was stopped by pursuing police officers 40 miles away in Lewisville where he was fatally shot after an exchange of gunfire.
August 29	Tulare	California	0	4	4	Four men were shot during the evening hours in a residential area.
August 27	Philadelphia (12)	Pennsylvania	0	4	4	Three men and a woman were shot in the Kensington neighborhood on the northeast side.
August 25	Warner Robins	Georgia	0	4	4	A drive-by shooting during a house party wounded a man and three women.
August 25	Sioux Falls (2)	South Dakota	1	3	4	A man was killed and three other men were injured in a shooting at Dunham Park.
August 25	Allentown (2)	Pennsylvania	0	8	8	A man fired at another group during a Dominican Festival in Downtown Allentown, resulting in a shootout that injured eight people.
August 25	Lubbock County	Texas	1	5	6	One person was killed and five others were injured in a shooting south of Lubbock.
August 25	Syosset	New York	5	0	5	A man fatally shot himself outside the home of his recently deceased mother after shooting and killing three of his siblings and a niece inside the home. They had gathered at the home for the funeral and planned to sell the estate.
August 25	Mobile (3)	Alabama	0	6	6	Six people were shot shortly after midnight in the Africatown neighborhood.
August 24	Chester (2)	Pennsylvania	1	3	4	One person was killed and three others were injured in a shooting at an intersection.
August 24	Whitfield County	Georgia	4	0	4	A 16-year-old boy fatally shot four men at a sports park north of Dalton in what was believed to be a robbery-motivated attack.
August 22	Houston (3)	Texas	0	4	4	Three masked people fired into a home in the Eastwood neighborhood, striking three teenagers and a young child, before fleeing.
August 22	Milwaukee (7)	Wisconsin	1	3	4	A man was killed and three other men, including a security guard, were injured in an early morning shooting at a north side bar in the Washington Park neighborhood.
August 21	Philadelphia (11)	Pennsylvania	0	4	4	Two people ran across a storefront area and opened fire, injuring four men in the process, in the Haverford North neighborhood on the west side.
August 20	Jackson (5)	Mississippi	0	6	6	Six people, including a three-year-old girl, were shot in a drive-by shooting in the Belhaven neighborhood.
August 20	Everett	Washington	0	4	4	Four people were shot overnight in the Westmont neighborhood.
August 20	Chicago (22)	Illinois	1	5	6	Two people opened fire in the Back of the Yards neighborhood on the south side, killing a man and injuring five other men, including a man who was driving by at the time of the attack.
August 19	Elizabethtown	Kentucky	3	1	4	A man killed two people and wounded one other outside the Hardin County courthouse and later shot and wounded himself after a police chase. The suspect later died at a hospital.
August 18	Oklahoma City (3)	Oklahoma	0	4	4	Four people were wounded when a person opened fire into a group of people in the Bricktown area of Downtown Oklahoma City. Two officers fired at the suspect before they eventually surrendered.
August 18	Baltimore (3)	Maryland	1	7	8	A man was killed and seven others were injured in a shooting at a gathering in the Oliver neighborhood.
August 18	Boston (2)	Massachusetts	0	5	5	Five people were shot at Franklin Park on the outskirts of the Dominican Festival.
August 18	Minneapolis (4)	Minnesota	0	4	4	A group of five children stole a vehicle and were followed by another vehicle. After some time at least one occupant in the other vehicle opened fire in the Jordan neighborhood, striking four of the children. Two of the children had been arrested less than two weeks prior for stealing another vehicle.
August 17	Oakland (3)	California	2	2	4	A crowded argument escalated into a shooting that killed two people and wounded two others in the city's east side.
August 17	Jackson (4)	Mississippi	1	5	6	An early morning shooting at a bar in Downtown Jackson killed one and injured five others.
August 16	Memphis (9)	Tennessee	0	4	4	A man shot four others outside a Midtown restaurant after arguing about a parking spot.
August 14	Colorado Springs	Colorado	1	3	4	One person was killed and three people were injured in a shooting at the Sandcreek Commons Condos.
August 14	Waianae (1)	Hawaii	1	3	4	A man chased a woman into a neighbor's home as a result of a domestic incident and began firing into the home, striking three people inside, before he was fatally shot by responding police.
August 14	Ettrick	Virginia	0	4	4	Four people were injured in an on-campus shooting at Virginia State University. None of the victims or suspects are students of the school.
August 12	Indianapolis (7)	Indiana	2	2	4	A man killed one person and wounded two adolescents before taking his own life.
August 12	Lawrence	Massachusetts	1	3	4	A man opened fire on his ex-girlfriend, her sister and brother, and her friend after he broke into their apartment. The man wounded his ex-girlfriend and her siblings and fatally shot her friend when he attempted to disarm him in a struggle.
August 12	Chicago (21)	Illinois	0	4	4	Four people were injured in a shooting at a Near West Side club after an argument escalated.
August 11	Tucson (2)	Arizona	0	4	4	Four people were injured in a shooting.
August 11	Sharpsburg	North Carolina	3	2	5	A man killed a woman and a six-year-old child while wounding two others before taking his own life in a domestic-related incident.
August 10	Cleveland (2)	Ohio	0	4	4	Four people were injured in a shooting at a car meet at the Lee Harvard Shopping Center in the Lee–Miles neighborhood.
August 10	Jacksonville (2)	Florida	0	6	6	Six people were shot outside of a pop-up nightclub in the Brentwood neighborhood.
August 10	Atlanta (5)	Georgia	0	5	5	A shooting at an event left five people wounded, including three teens, near a park on the city's southwest side in the Mechanicsville neighborhood.
August 9	Dallas (5)	Texas	0	4	4	Four people were injured in a shooting at Far North Dallas.
August 9	Charlotte (6)	North Carolina	0	4	4	A shooting at a Shell gas station injured four people on the city's south side in the Montclaire South neighborhood.
August 9	Lexington	Kentucky	1	5	6	One person was killed and five others were injured in an overnight shooting.
August 8	Birmingham (4)	Alabama	2	2	4	A man opened fire at two homes in the West End Manor neighborhood, killing two and injuring two others, in a domestic-related incident.
August 7	New York City (6)	New York	0	6	6	Six men were injured near St. James Park when two other men pulled up on scooters and opened fire in the Fordham neighborhood of The Bronx.
August 6	Morgan County	West Virginia	0	4	4	A fight at a house party at a home east of Berkeley Springs led to a shooting that wounded four.
August 5	Seattle (1)	Washington	0	4	4	A drive-by shooting on the edge of Downtown Seattle in Capitol Hill injured four people. One of the victims crashed his vehicle into the Swedish First Hill hospital while fleeing the scene.
August 5	Beechwood	Mississippi	1	3	4	A teenager killed another teenager and injured three other people after a dispute over a stolen cell phone east of Vicksburg.
August 5	Kansas City (7)	Missouri	1	5	6	One person was killed and five others were injured after an argument escalated into a shootout at a gathering in the city's south side.
August 4	Oakland (2)	California	0	5	5	A shooting during a sideshow injured five in the Dimond District neighborhood on the city's east side.
August 4	Memphis (8)	Tennessee	0	4	4	Three women and a man were injured when four men opened fire on them outside a nightclub on the city's northeast side.
August 4	Chicago (20)	Illinois	0	5	5	Five men were shot in the Washington Park neighborhood in the city's south side. The five shooting victims were uncooperative with responding police.
August 4	Chicago (19)	Illinois	1	3	4	A man was killed and three others were injured in a shooting outside a restaurant in Chinatown on the city's south side.
August 4	Tulsa	Oklahoma	0	8	8	Eight people were injured in an early morning shooting in the city's north side.
August 3	Springfield	Ohio	0	5	5	Five people were injured in a shooting attack southeast of downtown Springfield. Multiple vehicles were shot during the attack.
August 3	Washington (11)	District of Columbia	2	2	4	Two people were killed and two were injured in a shooting in the NoMa neighborhood of Northeast DC.
August 3	Milwaukee (6)	Wisconsin	0	5	5	Five people were shot outside of a bar in the city's north side in the Williamsburg neighborhood.
August 2	Charlotte (5)	North Carolina	1	3	4	One person was killed and three others were injured in the city's east side near the Charlotte Museum of History.
August 2	Lake County	Florida	4	2	6	A woman called law enforcement for a well-being check on a nearby home east of Umatilla and when officers arrived it appeared that a home had been burglarized, and they ordered people they heard inside to come out. When the officers made entry they were fired upon by the woman's husband and two daughters. All three attackers and one of the deputies were killed, while two other deputies sustained gunshot wounds. The woman who called 911 was later arrested and charged with premeditated murder.
August 1	Aurora (1)	Colorado	1	3	4	One person was killed and three others were injured in an afternoon shooting.
July 30	South Fulton	Georgia	1	3	4	A shooting at a Shell gas station left one dead and three others injured.
July 29	Portland	Maine	1	3	4	Four people were shot, one fatally, in the parking lot of an auto repair shop in the North Deering neighborhood.
July 28	Auburn	Washington	0	4	4	A group of four masked men opened fire on another group exiting a bus at a bus stop, injuring four, in what is believed to be a targeted attack. One of the victims in the group returned fire.
July 28	South Bend (2)	Indiana	0	4	4	Four people were injured in the city's northeast side.
July 28	St. Louis (5)	Missouri	1	3	4	A woman was killed and three others were injured in a shooting at a restaurant in the Tower Grove East neighborhood on the city's south side.
July 28	Escambia County	Florida	2	5	7	A drive-by shooting at a community center northwest of Brent where a basketball game was being held killed two people and injured five others.
July 28	Los Angeles (4)	California	0	4	4	Four people, including a 14-year-old boy, were wounded in a drive-by shooting in the South Park neighborhood of South Los Angeles.
July 28	Rochester (2)	New York	2	5	7	Two people were killed and five others were injured in a shooting in Maplewood Park in the Maplewood Historic District.
July 28	Milwaukee (5)	Wisconsin	0	5	5	Five teenagers were shot in the city's northwest side.
July 28	Champaign	Illinois	2	2	4	Three teenagers and a woman were shot in an apartment complex parking lot, with two of the teens being killed.
July 27	Dallas (4)	Texas	0	5	5	Three shooters opened fire at a gas station, wounding five, in the city's south side.
July 26	Kankakee	Illinois	0	6	6	A fight at a birthday party among a group of adults and juveniles at Pioneer Park escalated into a shooting that wounded six.
July 25	Jeanerette	Louisiana	1	3	4	A Lafayette police SWAT team member was killed and three others were wounded in a shootout during a hostage situation, in which a man wanted for a drive-by shooting barricaded himself inside a home with two others, including a juvenile.
July 24	Yancey County	North Carolina	0	4	4	Three people were injured when a man opened fire on a tree trimming crew. The suspect was shot by police before being taken into custody.
July 23	Burton	South Carolina	0	4	4	Four people were shot inside a vehicle when they were fired upon by at least one other person inside another vehicle.
July 22	Milwaukee (4)	Wisconsin	1	8	9	A shooting in a Dineen Park parking lot left a teenage girl dead and eight others wounded.
July 21	Anderson	Indiana	0	7	7	A shooting at a block party injured seven people, including two teenagers.
July 21	Jackson (3)	Mississippi	2	4	6	A shooting at a Shell gas station killed two, including the owner, and injured four others.
July 21	Indianola	Mississippi	3	16	19	Three men, including two suspects, were killed and sixteen people wounded in a shooting near a club.
July 21	Philadelphia (10)	Pennsylvania	3	6	9	An altercation at a block party escalated into a gunfight that killed three people and injured six others, including one of the shooters in the Carroll Park neighborhood of the city's west side.
July 20	Vista	California	1	3	4	A shooting killed a young man and injured three others.
July 19	Broken Arrow	Oklahoma	4	0	4	A man killed his brother, grandfather and aunt before committing suicide.
July 18	Bibb County	Alabama	5	0	5	A man killed his wife and four children north of West Blocton.
July 18	Washington (10)	District of Columbia	2	2	4	Three suspects opened fire with rifles in an intersection in the Shipley Terrace neighborhood of southeast DC, killing two men and injuring two others, including a two-year-old girl.
July 18	Los Angeles (3)	California	0	4	4	Two suspects opened fire near a taco stand in the Westlake neighborhood, injuring one intended target and three others.
July 15	Orange (2)	Texas	0	4	4	Four people were injured in a shooting on the city's east side.
July 15	Minneapolis (3)	Minnesota	1	5	6	One person was killed and five other people were injured in a shooting at an encampment in the Ventura Village neighborhood of Phillips on the city's south side. One man was arrested on obstruction charges and unrelated warrants.
July 14	Goose Creek	South Carolina	1	3	4	A male teenager opened fire on three women, including two other teenagers, as they attempted to enter a vehicle at an apartment complex. After killing one of the teenagers, the shooter then shot himself.
July 14	Indianapolis (6)	Indiana	0	5	5	Five people, including a boy, were injured in a shooting at a basketball court in the Carson Heights neighborhood on the city's south side.
July 14	Holly Springs	Mississippi	4	0	4	Officers responding to a home found three women shot to death in a car and a man dead on the driveway. Investigators later determined it was a murder-suicide.
July 14	Chicago (18)	Illinois	0	4	4	Four people were wounded when someone fired multiple shots into the group during a celebration in the Jeffery Manor neighborhood of the city's south side.
July 13	New Haven (1)	Connecticut	0	4	4	Four people were shot in the Newhallville neighborhood on the city's north side.
July 13	Birmingham (3)	Alabama	4	10	14	A drive-by shooting in the city's north side killed four people and injured ten others at a birthday party held by a social club.
July 13	Meridian	Pennsylvania	2	3	5	Attempted assassination of Donald Trump in Pennsylvania: A man opened fire on former President Donald Trump during a campaign rally being held at the Butler Farm Show fairground from atop a nearby roof, killing an audience member, grazing Trump on the ear, and critically injuring two other audience members. The man was then killed by a Secret Service sniper. A Butler Township officer who attempted to climb onto the roof to confront the shooter severely injured his ankle when he fell off the roof when the man pointed his rifle at him just before opening fire on the rally.
July 12	Louisville (6)	Kentucky	0	5	5	Three women and two men were shot in the Russell neighborhood.
July 12	Wichita (2)	Kansas	1	4	5	Four people were found shot, one fatally, in the city's southwest side. One of the victims critically wounded in the same shooting was also found in the South Seneca neighborhood.
July 12	Chicago (17)	Illinois	0	5	5	A drive-by shooting in the North Lawndale neighborhood on the city's west side left five people wounded.
July 11	Wichita (1)	Kansas	0	4	4	Two males opened fire on a group of teenagers, wounding all four, in the Murdock neighborhood.
July 10	Alameda	California	5	0	5	A man fatally shot his wife, her parents, and two of his sons at their home before being arrested.
July 10	Boston (1)	Massachusetts	0	5	5	Five people, including an 11-year-old, were shot while celebrating at a gathering in the Dorchester neighborhood.
July 9	Charlotte (4)	North Carolina	1	3	4	A drug deal gone wrong resulted in a shooting that killed one and injured three in the Westover Hills neighborhood in the city's west side.
July 8	Fort Lauderdale	Florida	2	3	5	Two people were killed and three others, including a two-year-old, were injured in a drive-by shooting.
July 8	Washington (9)	District of Columbia	0	4	4	Four people were injured near the Navy Yard neighborhood of southeast DC.
July 8	New Bedford	Massachusetts	0	6	6	A shooting at a playground left six people injured.
July 7	Washington County	North Carolina	1	3	4	A man was killed and three others were injured when shots were fired at a house party at a home north of Roper.
July 7	Detroit (6)	Michigan	2	19	21	A block party shooting left two dead and nineteen injured in the Mohican Regent neighborhood on the city's northeast side. Teenagers were among the victims.
July 6	Akron (2)	Ohio	0	4	4	A toddler and three adults were injured in the Goodyear Heights neighborhood.
July 6	Milwaukee (3)	Wisconsin	0	4	4	Four people, including three teenagers, were shot in the Williamsburg neighborhood.
July 6	Florence	Kentucky	5	3	8	2024 Florence shooting: Four people were killed and three others were injured in a shooting at a residence. The shooter fled the scene in a vehicle and was pursued by police before committing suicide and crashing his car into a ditch.
July 5	Clarksdale (1)	Mississippi	1	3	4	A drive-by shooting left a man dead and three other men injured when they were fired upon while sitting in a car together.
July 5	Poughkeepsie	New York	0	4	4	Four people were shot overnight along the city's main street.
July 5	Pontiac	Michigan	0	5	5	A fight during a party escalated when someone opened fire into a crowd, striking five teenage boys.
July 5	Albany (2)	Georgia	1	3	4	A fight in a nightclub was brought out into the parking lot where multiple people retrieved guns and opened fire, killing a man and injuring three others.
July 5	Tampa (3)	Florida	0	4	4	Four people, including a security guard, were injured after a fight between two suspects escalated into a shooting at an adult entertainment club.
July 5	Albany	New York	0	6	6	Six teenagers were shot during a large Independence Day party at home.
July 5	Chicago (16)	Illinois	1	6	7	A shootout between two individuals killed one person and wounded six, including a 15-year-old boy in the Austin neighborhood on the city's west side.
July 5	Chicago (15)	Illinois	0	8	8	Eight people were wounded during a shootout between two individuals in the Little Italy neighborhood in the city's west side.
July 4	Ocean Springs	Mississippi	0	16	16	A man fired a round of birdshot at a neighbor's Independence Day party, injuring sixteen people, including multiple children.
July 4	Spanish Lake	Missouri	1	5	6	A man was killed and five others were injured.
July 4	St. Louis (4)	Missouri	0	7	7	Seven people, including four teenagers, were wounded in a shooting in Downtown St. Louis.
July 4	Nashville (4)	Tennessee	0	4	4	Four people were struck by celebratory gunfire in Downtown Nashville during an Independence Day celebration.
July 4	Fort Worth (2)	Texas	3	3	6	A fight at a car wash in the Far Southwest neighborhood developed into a shooting in which a man fatally shot another man as well as a baby and a toddler and injured two others. During the gunfire the shooter was also injured.
July 4	Philadelphia (9)	Pennsylvania	1	8	9	A man was killed and eight others were injured in a drive-by shooting in the city's southwest side.
July 4	Indianapolis (5)	Indiana	1	3	4	A dispute over fireworks led to a man opening fire on a group in the Marian - Cold Springs, killing a woman, before he was fired back upon and injured.
July 4	Chicago (14)	Illinois	3	2	5	Two adults and a child were killed and two other children were wounded in the Greater Grand Crossing neighborhood on the city's south side after a personal dispute escalated.
July 2	Knoxville	Tennessee	3	1	4	Two men opened fire outside a bar in northwest Knoxville, killing two, including a security guard, and wounding another. One of the shooters later fatally shot himself on July 11 in a Jacksonville, Florida hotel room after U.S. Marshals closed in on him.
July 1	Philadelphia (8)	Pennsylvania	0	5	5	Five people were wounded during a shootout at a Chinese restaurant in the Grays Ferry neighborhood in the city's south side.
July 1	Charleston	Missouri	0	6	6	Six people were shot in a civic center parking lot.
July 1	Cincinnati (2)	Ohio	3	1	4	Four people were shot, three fatally, in a shooting in Corryville near the campus of the University of Cincinnati.
June 29	Screven County	Georgia	0	6	6	Six people were wounded during a block party when multiple shooters opened fire at a fireworks festival in the Lawton Place neighborhood near Sylvania.
June 29	Coweta County	Georgia	4	0	4	A man shot and killed three people at a home before killing himself.
June 28	Crete	Nebraska	1	7	8	A man opened fire at a home across from his, wounding seven, including four children. After police made entry into the shooter's house they found him dead of a self-inflicted gunshot wound. The victims were Guatemalan immigrants, and authorities are investigating if there was a racial motive.
June 28	Niagara Falls	New York	0	4	4	A fight escalated into a shooting that wounded four, including a teenage boy, shortly after midnight.
June 28	Corpus Christi (1)	Texas	2	3	5	Two teenagers were killed and three others were injured in a midnight shooting in the city's west side.
June 26	Lancaster (1)	California	2	5	7	Two men were killed and five others were injured when a group of men outside an apartment complex were fired upon.
June 26	Milwaukee (2)	Wisconsin	0	4	4	Four people were injured in a targeted shooting at a BP gas station, including two children, in the White Manor neighborhood.
June 24	North Las Vegas (2)	Nevada	6	1	7	Five people were killed and a teenage girl was critically injured at an apartment complex. The suspect later committed suicide after being located by officers.
June 24	Manatee County (1) & Memphis	Florida	4	0	4	A man drove to a Motel 6 east of Bradenton where he fatally shot his mother. He then drove to a home in Memphis where he killed one of his cousins. Finally, he drove to a home south of West Bradenton where he killed his final victim, the friend of one of his ex-girlfriends. During the early morning of the following day the shooter was killed in a shoot-out with Hamilton County Sheriff's Office deputies at a service station off Interstate 75.
June 24	York	Pennsylvania	0	4	4	Four teenage girls were shot during the early evening.
June 24	Dayton (2)	Ohio	1	4	5	Four people, including an 11-year-old boy, were injured in a domestic related shooting in the Greenwich Village neighborhood. The suspect was also injured and drove himself to a hospital where he later died.
June 24	Dayton (1)	Ohio	2	5	7	A woman was killed and six others were injured in a drive-by shooting in the MacFarlane neighborhood. One of the victims who was a teenager later died.
June 23	Trenton	New Jersey	0	4	4	Four people were shot in the Greenwood & Hamilton neighborhood during the early morning.
June 23	Vallejo	California	0	4	4	Four people were shot during the early morning hours.
June 23	Winston-Salem	North Carolina	1	4	5	An 18-year-old man was killed and four others were injured, including the man who killed him, in an early morning shooting.
June 23	Montgomery (3)	Alabama	0	9	9	A shooting at a party wounded nine, including three juveniles, in the Boylston neighborhood. Four others were injured while fleeing the gunfire either in vehicular accidents or by broken glass.
June 23	St. Louis (3)	Missouri	1	5	6	A fight in Downtown St. Louis erupted in gunfire, killing a man and injuring five others. A police officer was assaulted while responding to the scene.
June 23	Rochester (1)	New York	0	6	6	A fight at a park in Downtown Rochester escalated into a shooting that wounded six. While securing the scene a police officer was assaulted and suffered a knee injury by a man who was then arrested.
June 23	Tampa (2)	Florida	1	3	4	Jacksonville-based rapper Julio Foolio was killed and three others were injured in an 'ambush' shooting at the Holiday Inn parking lot near the University of South Florida campus.
June 23	Columbus (4)	Ohio	0	10	10	Ten people were shot in the Short North Arts District near Downtown Columbus.
June 22	Henrico County (2)	Virginia	0	6	6	Six adults were shot north of Glen Allen off of State Route 626 shortly before midnight.
June 22	Canton	Mississippi	1	5	6	A 19-year-old man fatally shot another man and injured five others at a popular city hangout spot.
June 22	Louisville (5)	Kentucky	1	7	8	Eight people were shot at a nightclub, with one man being killed, in the Russell neighborhood shortly after midnight.
June 21	Meridian	Mississippi	1	3	4	A man was killed and three others were injured in a shooting during the late afternoon.
June 21	Washington (8)	District of Columbia	0	4	4	Three men and a woman were shot in the Congress Heights neighborhood of southeast DC shortly before midnight.
June 21	Fordyce	Arkansas	4	10	14	2024 Fordyce shooting: A shooting at a local grocery store left four people dead and nine others injured, including two police officers. The shooter was shot by responding police and arrested.
June 19	Oakland (1)	California	0	15	15	During a Juneteenth celebration near Lake Merritt, an illegal sideshow began, and a fight escalated, leading to fifteen people being struck by gunfire. One woman was also arrested for assaulting a police officer.
June 19	Philadelphia (7)	Pennsylvania	0	7	7	Three shooters opened fire at a crowd in the Allegheny West neighborhood on the city's north side, wounding seven, including a teenage girl. Police believe the victims were targeted.
June 18	Richmond	California	2	2	4	Two people were killed, including a pregnant woman, and two others were injured in a shooting in the Iron Triangle neighborhood. Two of the shooting victims are juveniles.
June 17	Macon (1)	Georgia	1	3	4	A woman was killed and three men were wounded in a shooting shortly before midnight.
June 17	Chicago (13)	Illinois	0	7	7	A shootout between two people in the West Englewood community on the city's southwest side left seven people injured in the crossfire.
June 17	Chicago (12)	Illinois	0	5	5	A person fired into a crowd of people in the Humboldt Park community on the city's west side, wounding five, including three teenagers. A woman also suffered a broken ankle while fleeing the gunfire.
June 16	South Bend (1)	Indiana	0	4	4	A shooting at a Marathon gas station left four people injured.
June 16	Methuen	Massachusetts	0	7	7	Seven people were shot during a gathering in a commercial area, including several teenagers, with one other sustaining a head injury while fleeing.
June 16	Pine Bluff	Arkansas	1	3	4	Four people were shot, one fatally, in the parking lot of a lakeside park.
June 15	Detroit (5)	Michigan	1	4	5	Four females, including at least one teenager, and a man were shot in the Osborn area on the city's northeast side. One adult female was killed.
June 15	Northdale	Florida	3	1	4	A 19-year-old man killed his parents and injured one officer in a shootout. He was then shot and killed by officers.
June 15	Round Rock	Texas	2	14	16	Two people were killed and at least fourteen people were injured in a shooting at Old Settlers Park during a Juneteenth festival, which featured performances from artists such as Sean Ardoin and Paul Wall, when two groups opened fire on each other.
June 15	Cincinnati (1)	Ohio	0	5	5	Five people were wounded in a shooting at an event being held at a park in the Madisonville neighborhood in the city's northeast side.
June 15	Lathrup Village	Michigan	0	6	6	A shooting at a party being held at a home wounded six, including several teenagers.
June 15	Tuskegee (1)	Alabama	1	3	4	A shooting at a gas station killed a man and injured three others, including a city fire marshal.
June 15	Rochester Hills	Michigan	1	9	10	2024 Rochester Hills shooting: A man pulled up and exited his vehicle, approached a splash pad before opening fire, wounding nine people, including two children. The suspect died of a self-inflicted gunshot wound hours later after barricading himself in a house.
June 14	Mercer County	West Virginia	0	5	5	Two family members opened fire on each other at a Days Inn east of Lilly Grove. One shooter and four bystanders, including a five-year-old, were struck by gunfire.
June 14	Franklin Park	Florida	1	4	5	A man was killed and four others were injured in a drive-by shooting.
June 14	Columbus (3)	Ohio	2	2	4	Four people were shot, with two men being killed, at a nightclub in Downtown Columbus.
June 14	Chicago (11)	Illinois	0	4	4	A drive-by shooting in the Calumet Heights community in the city's south side left three men and a woman injured.
June 13	Chicago (10)	Illinois	0	4	4	A drive-by shooting in the West Pullman community in the city's south side left three women and a man injured.
June 12	Pasco County (1)	Florida	4	0	4	A family of four was murdered and set ablaze east of Hudson. Officers found the bodies inside the burn pit two days later and arrested the suspect the next day.
June 11	La Junta	Colorado	4	0	4	A murder-suicide at a home left two adults and two children dead.
June 11	Lost Nation	Illinois	0	4	4	Police responded to a person barricaded in a home threatening suicide. Police were then fired upon from inside the home, striking three officers, before the shooter was shot and injured and taken into custody.
June 11	Atlanta (4)	Georgia	0	4	4	A man shot three people after an altercation at a mall food court in the Peachtree Center of Downtown Atlanta before being shot by a police officer.
June 11	Memphis (7)	Tennessee	0	5	5	Four minors and an adult were injured in a shooting on I-240 in East Memphis. A car chase then occurred as police chased the suspects believed to be involved in the shooting, which resulted in an officer crashing in Raleigh. The suspects later crashed and were detained in Frayser.
June 9	Dallas (3)	Texas	0	4	4	Three men and a teenage boy were shot in the Deep Ellum neighborhood in the city's east side overnight.
June 9	Richmond (3)	Virginia	0	4	4	Four people were shot in Downtown Richmond shortly before midnight.
June 9	Washington (7)	District of Columbia	0	6	6	Six people were injured in a shooting in the Fairlawn neighborhood of Southeast DC, including three teenagers, during the late afternoon. A police officer crashed and was injured while responding to the scene.
June 9	Madison (1)	Wisconsin	0	10	10	Ten people were shot after at least one person opened fire at a rooftop party at an apartment complex near the University of Wisconsin–Madison campus, including several teenagers. Two people suffered other injuries.
June 8	Eufaula	Alabama	0	4	4	Four people were shot at a block party during the evening hours.
June 8	Charlotte (3)	North Carolina	0	4	4	An argument in a business parking lot escalated when a man retrieved a firearm from his car and opened fire, striking four, in the Fourth Ward.
June 8	Sioux Falls (1)	South Dakota	3	2	5	Three adults were found dead overnight and two others injured after police responded to a disturbance call.
June 7	Beaufort County	South Carolina	0	4	4	A teenage girl was among four wounded in a shooting at a graduation party being held in the yard of a home east of Sheldon.
June 7	Compton (3)	California	1	5	6	One person was killed and five were injured in a shooting at a backyard birthday party in the evening.
June 7	Jennings	Missouri	1	4	5	A shooting at a park left a man dead and four other men injured during the afternoon.
June 6	Ponce	Puerto Rico	3	2	5	Several suspects fired into a crowd, killing three people and injuring two.
June 6	Kansas City (6)	Missouri	2	2	4	A shooting at a home in a domestic violence incident left a man and a boy dead and two others, including another boy, injured in the Oak Park Northwest neighborhood.
June 3	Philadelphia (6)	Pennsylvania	0	4	4	Two men riding a moped opened fire on a group in the Fairhill neighborhood in the city's north side, wounding four, including two teenagers.
June 3	Dumfries	Virginia	1	3	4	A 15-year-old boy was killed and three others, including two other teenagers, were wounded in a shooting during the late evening.
June 3	Memphis (6)	Tennessee	0	4	4	Four people were wounded in a shooting in the Raleigh neighborhood in the city's north side.
June 2	Pensacola	Florida	0	4	4	A large fight escalated into a shooting that wounded four shortly after midnight.
June 2	St. Louis (2)	Missouri	0	6	6	Six people were shot outside a bar in the Fairgrounds neighborhood in the city's north side.
June 2	Newport News	Virginia	0	4	4	Four men were shot in the Chestnut neighborhood during the early morning hours.
June 2	Penn Hills	Pennsylvania	2	7	9	A man and a woman were killed and seven others were injured in an exchange of gunfire inside a bar.
June 2	Louisville (4)	Kentucky	0	6	6	Six minors were wounded in a shooting during a party at a business.
June 2	Akron (1)	Ohio	1	29	30	A man was killed and 29 others were injured in an overnight shooting at a street party.
June 2	Kendale Lakes	Florida	4	0	4	Police discovered four bodies inside a home during afternoon. It was learned that a man fatally shot his parents and his partner before turning the gun on himself.
June 1	Philadelphia (5)	Pennsylvania	1	3	4	A shooting in the Cobbs Creek neighborhood in the city's west side left one man dead and three others injured.
June 1	Columbus (2)	Ohio	1	3	4	A man was killed and three others were injured in a shooting in the Mount Vernon neighborhood on the city's east side.
June 1	Rock Hill	South Carolina	2	2	4	A man and a woman were killed and two others were injured in a shooting during a block party.
June 1	Detroit (4)	Michigan	1	3	4	Four people were wounded in a shooting at a block party in the Miller Grove neighborhood on the city's westside, including a suspect by police gunfire. One of the victims later died of her injuries.
June 1	Santan	Arizona	2	4	6	Two people, including a police officer, were killed when at least one person opened fire on a crowd outside a home in the Gila River Indian Community during the early morning. Four others were injured, including another police officer.
May 30	DeKalb County (1)	Georgia	0	6	6	A shootout at a home east of Candler-McAfee injured six men.
May 30	Elkridge	Maryland	4	1	5	A man fatally shot his wife, daughter, and daughter-in-law and injured his son before committing suicide at a town-home. A three-month-old baby was left unharmed.
May 30	Minneapolis (2)	Minnesota	4	3	7	2024 Minneapolis shooting: Two men were shot and killed in an apartment building in the Whittier neighborhood by a gunman. The gunman exchanged fire with police who responded to the scene, killing one officer and injuring three other people. The gunman was then killed. One injured victim later succumbed to his wounds on June 9.
May 28	Waterbury	Connecticut	0	4	4	Four people were shot during the late afternoon.
May 27	Richmond (2)	Virginia	2	2	4	A 15-year-old boy and a man were killed and two others, including another teenager, were wounded in a shooting shortly before midnight in the Whitcomb neighborhood on the city's East End.
May 27	Sacramento	California	0	5	5	Five people were shot at an apartment complex in the Meadowview neighborhood on the city's south side.
May 27	Lansing	Michigan	1	6	7	A 17-year-old was killed and six other people, mostly teenagers, were injured in a late night shooting at a park in Downtown Lansing.
May 26	Chicago (9)	Illinois	1	3	4	A man was killed and three others, including a teenager, were injured in a shooting in the North Lawndale neighborhood of the city's West Side during the early morning.
May 26	Kansas City (5)	Missouri	1	5	6	A man shot five people in the entertainment district of Westport on the city's south side before he was fatally shot by a public safety officer.
May 26	Cleveland (1)	Ohio	1	3	4	A man was killed and three other people were injured in a late night shooting in Downtown Cleveland.
May 25	San Fernando	California	0	5	5	A man shot five people at a home before barricading himself. During a stand-off with police the man fired shots at an LAPD helicopter before he was arrested.
May 25	North St. Paul	Minnesota	0	4	4	Four people were injured, including a teenage boy, in a shooting at a park during the evening hours.
May 25	Fort Pierce (2)	Florida	0	5	5	Five people, including three teenagers, were wounded in a shooting shortly after midnight.
May 24	Hopkins Park	Illinois	2	3	5	Three people were injured and two were killed in a shooting during a party at a banquet hall shortly before midnight.
May 22	Chester (1)	Pennsylvania	2	3	5	A man armed with a handgun shot five people at a linen business, killing two. The suspect was allegedly a disgruntled employee.
May 21	Harrisburg (2)	Pennsylvania	0	4	4	Three people were found shot at an intersection in the Allison Hill neighborhood. A fourth person was also found shot on the next street over.
May 21	Chicago (8)	Illinois	0	4	4	Four men who were walking were shot when someone in a car pulled up and opened fire in the North Lawndale neighborhood on the city's west side.
May 20	Detroit (3)	Michigan	1	4	5	A verbal argument escalated when a man pulled out a gun and fired multiple shots, killing another man and wounding four other people in the Bagley neighborhood in the city's northwest side.
May 18	Caswell County	North Carolina	3	2	5	A man fatally shot a woman and a juvenile and injured two other juveniles at a home in Stoney Creek Township. Alamance County deputies spotted the shooter in a car in Burlington and after commanding him to surrender he fatally shot himself.
May 18	St. Louis (1)	Missouri	1	3	4	A shooting in the Midtown neighborhood killed a man and injured three others.
May 18	Bridgeton	Missouri	0	5	5	Police responded to calls of around 100 vehicles being driven recklessly on Missouri Route 141 and a connecting road. Once police arrived they were fired upon from multiple vehicles and five people were struck by gunfire, none of them being officers.
May 18	Savannah (1)	Georgia	0	11	11	Shortly before midnight, a dispute between two women led to a shooting that left eleven people injured in Ellis Square.
May 18	Chicago (7)	Illinois	0	6	6	Three people opened fire on a group of men in the East Garfield Park neighborhood on the city's west side, wounding six.
May 18	Fort Pierce (1)	Florida	3	1	4	A man shot three, mortally wounding two, before being killed by police.
May 18	Sarasota County	Florida	1	4	5	A shooting during the early morning at a shopping plaza just outside of Sarasota killed one and injured four.
May 18	Columbus (1)	Ohio	3	3	6	An early morning shooting between the Weinland Park and Italian Village neighborhoods resulted in three people killed and three others wounded.
May 12	Ridgeland	Mississippi	4	0	4	A man fatally shot his mother and his two adult sisters at a home before fleeing the state. Arizona Highway Patrol officers located him on U.S. 191 a day after the murders between Morenci and Clifton where he was fatally shot after brandishing a firearm at police.
May 12	Riverview	Missouri	1	3	4	A 15-year-old boy was killed and three others were injured in a shooting during the evening hours.
May 12	Tallahassee	Florida	2	2	4	Two men were killed and two others were injured in a shooting at a shopping center during the early morning hours.
May 12	Northborough	Massachusetts	1	3	4	Shortly after midnight a partygoer flagged down police officers and told them that someone at a house party was brandishing a firearm. When police arrived they heard gunshots and found four people had been shot. A 16-year-old boy was killed.
May 12	Atlanta (3)	Georgia	2	4	6	Two people were killed and four were injured after a fight at a nightclub escalated into a shooting in the Colonial Homes neighborhood.
May 11	Atlanta (2)	Georgia	1	3	4	Officers responded to a report of an armed man in the Capitol View neighborhood. When they arrived, they found a man armed with a handgun, and when one of them attempted to restrain him, he opened fire and struck three of them. They then returned fire, killing him.
May 11	Baldwin County	Alabama	3	15	18	Three people were killed and fifteen were injured in a shooting at a May Day event being held in a field north of Stockton.
May 11	Louisville (3)	Kentucky	2	2	4	Two men were killed and two others were injured in a shooting at a bar in the Southland Park neighborhood.
May 8	Durham (1)	North Carolina	1	3	4	A man shot three men and a woman at an apartment complex, killing one of the men.
May 8	Bexar County	Texas	1	4	5	Two people opened fire at a home in a targeted attack just outside of San Antonio, striking five, including three children. A four-year-old was killed.
May 8	Gwinnett County (2)	Georgia	4	0	4	A man killed three children he was babysitting at a park before he killed himself just north of Tucker.
May 6	Fort Wayne (1)	Indiana	0	4	4	A large fight escalated into a shooting that wounded four in the Pettit-Rudisill neighborhood.
May 5	Gallup	New Mexico	2	2	4	A man shot four people, including a child, at a shopping mall during the early morning hours. Two men were killed.
May 5	Huntsville (1)	Alabama	0	5	5	A shooting at a bar wounded five during the late evening hours.
May 5	Birmingham (2)	Alabama	1	6	7	A shooting outside a gas station in the Bush Hills neighborhood left one dead and six injured.
May 5	Tuscaloosa County (2)	Alabama	1	3	4	An altercation at a home just outside of Tuscaloosa escalated into a shooting, leaving one dead and three injured.
May 4	Fresno (1)	California	0	5	5	A man got into an argument at a family gathering at a home. The man then returned to the gathering armed with two of his brothers, striking five, including a five-year-old and a teenager, as well as both of his brothers.
May 4	Buffalo	New York	1	5	6	A shooting at a house party in the Cold Springs neighborhood killed a 14-year-old girl and wounded five other teenagers.
May 4	Long Beach	California	0	7	7	Two people opened fire on a group outside a nightclub in the Davenport Park neighborhood, injuring seven, in what is believed to be a gang-related incident.
May 4	New York City (5)	New York	1	3	4	A shooting at an event center where a baby shower was being held in the Richmond Hill area of Queens killed a man and injured three other men.
May 4	Memphis (5)	Tennessee	1	3	4	Four people were shot, one fatally, near a shopping center in the Hickory Hill neighborhood.
May 4	Philadelphia (4)	Pennsylvania	1	3	4	An 18-year-old was killed and three others, including two other teenagers, were injured in a shooting at a home in the Kingsessing neighborhood.
May 3	Pulaski County & Russell County	Kentucky	3	1	4	A woman fatally shot her husband outside their home in Pulaski County before driving southwest to the home of her sister in Russell County where she fatally shot her sister. She then drove northeast to the home of her brother where she forced herself inside, injuring him before he mortally wounded her in self-defense.
May 3	Westbury	New York	0	6	6	Six people were shot at a birthday party, five of whom were minors.
May 2	Henrico County (1)	Virginia	1	3	4	A shooting at an apartment complex during a cook-out killed a man and injured three other men just north of Richmond.
May 1	Detroit (2)	Michigan	0	4	4	An altercation between two women at a park near Frank Cody High School on the city's west side lead to a man opening fire, hitting two women and two children. One of the women shot is pregnant.
May 1	Fort Worth (1)	Texas	0	6	6	A drive-by shooting outside an apartment complex wounded six, the youngest of whom was three years old and the oldest of whom was 19 years old.
April 29	Charlotte (2)	North Carolina	5	4	9	2024 Charlotte shootout: Four police officers were killed and four others were injured in a shootout during a U.S. Marshals task force search for a wanted fugitive in the Shannon Park neighborhood. The subject of the warrant was also killed.
April 29	Miami Gardens (1)	Florida	0	5	5	A fight amongst a group of students at Miami Norland Senior High School was brought off-campus to be discussed among a group of adults and teenagers. During the discussion, another fight occurred and an adult pulled out a gun and opened fire, striking two teenagers and three adults.
April 28	Saint Thomas (1)	United States Virgin Islands	1	5	6	A man was killed and five others injured in the area of a heavy equipment company.
April 28	Hinds County	Mississippi	1	4	5	An argument among a group at a club just northeast of Utica escalated into a shooting that killed a man and injured four others.
April 28	Kenner	Louisiana	1	5	6	A man wanted for an armed robbery and shooting the previous week shot two more men whom he mistook for undercover police officers, which led to a standoff in which he shot three police officers before being killed by a police sniper.
April 28	Seminole County	Florida	0	10	10	Ten people were shot when a 16-year-old boy opened fire early Sunday during a verbal altercation at Cabana Live, a restaurant and event venue near Sanford. The suspect was apprehended and booked into the juvenile detention center.
April 28	San Antonio (3)	Texas	2	4	6	Two people were killed and four were injured in a late-night shootout involving police officers at Market Square during the Festival San Antonio. An 18-year-old man shot and killed another man before being fatally shot by police. Four bystanders were injured.
April 28	Tucson (1)	Arizona	1	3	4	A shooting during a party at a home killed a young woman and injured three others.
April 28	Fitzgerald	Georgia	1	3	4	A 15-year-old opened fire at an after-prom party and killed another 15-year-old and wounded three other teenagers.
April 27	Orangeburg County	South Carolina	1	3	4	A 16-year-old opened fire shortly after midnight at the end of an after-prom party for Lake Marion High School students and killed a 19-year-old and wounded three others.
April 27	Mobile (2)	Alabama	0	5	5	Five people were injured when two people opened fire upon each other at a barber shop in the Pleasant Valley neighborhood.
April 27	Daytona Beach	Florida	0	4	4	Four people were injured after a street fight turned into a shooting in the Seabreeze neighborhood.
April 26	Washington (6)	District of Columbia	0	6	6	A man who was kicked out of a bar pulled out a gun and shot six people, including a security guard, in the Dupont Circle neighborhood of in Northwest DC.
April 24	Springdale	Arkansas	2	2	4	A man shot and killed a woman and wounded two other people in a car before killing himself.
April 22	Dinwiddie County	Virginia	0	5	5	Five people, including two teenagers, were injured in a drive-by shooting outside an apartment complex southwest of Petersburg.
April 22	Oklahoma City (2)	Oklahoma	5	0	5	A man killed his wife and three of their children before killing himself in their home near Yukon. A fourth child was found unharmed.
April 21	Oak Forest	Illinois	1	3	4	Two teenage girls and a 12-year-old girl were shot in a neighborhood. Authorities then tracked down and stopped a car believed to be involved in the shooting. Inside they found two people, one with a mortal gunshot wound to the head and a person of interest who was arrested.
April 20	Memphis (4)	Tennessee	2	7	9	At least two shooters opened fire and killed two people, while wounding seven others at a large block party being held at a park in the Orange Mound neighborhood.
April 20	Weirton	West Virginia	3	1	4	A man fatally shot two women and injured another at a home before committing suicide.
April 19	Washington (5)	District of Columbia	0	4	4	A drive-by shooting outside a convenience store in the Trinidad neighborhood of Northeast DC wounded four, including a teenager.
April 19	Greenbelt	Maryland	0	5	5	Around 500 juvenile and young adult students gathered at a park for "senior skip day" for a water gun fight. During the fight, someone opened fire with an actual gun, striking five teenagers.
April 18	Chackbay	Louisiana	0	4	4	A fight among a group of people escalated into a shooting that wounded four during the evening hours.
April 16	New York City (4)	New York	1	3	4	One person was killed and three were injured by two shooters riding scooters in the Mount Eden neighborhood of The Bronx.
April 16	Sampson County	North Carolina	1	3	4	A man was killed and three others were injured south of Clinton.
April 14	Hopkinsville	Kentucky	0	4	4	A drive-by shooting outside a county health department office wounded four, including three juveniles.
April 14	New Orleans (3)	Louisiana	1	11	12	A shooting at a nightclub in the Lower Garden District killed a woman and injured eleven others.
April 14	Richmond (1)	Virginia	1	3	4	A teenager was killed and three others were injured in a shooting outside a home in the Montrose Heights neighborhood.
April 14	Dallas (2)	Texas	1	8	9	A shooting believed to have stemmed from gang violence killed a woman and injured eight others after a large party went out onto the street in South Dallas.
April 14	Nashville (3)	Tennessee	0	6	6	An argument between the two individuals escalated into a shooting that left six people injured near a nightclub in South Nashville.
April 13	Coldwater	Mississippi	1	3	4	A man was killed and three others were injured in a shooting at a home during the morning hours.
April 13	Albany (1)	Georgia	0	4	4	A fight at a nightclub between gang members escalated when a man fired shots into a crowd, striking four, during the early morning hours.
April 13	Chicago (6)	Illinois	1	10	11	A child was killed and ten others, including three other children, were injured when three shooters walked up to a street and opened fire at a remote crowd during a family gathering in the Back of the Yards neighborhood on the South Side.
April 13	Wynne	Arkansas	1	9	10	A man was killed and nine others were injured in a shooting erupted at a block party during the evening hours.
April 12	Memphis (3)	Tennessee	2	3	5	Two suspects engaged in a shootout with Memphis Police Department officers, leaving a suspect and a police officer dead and the other suspect and two others wounded. The dead officer was killed by friendly fire from other officers.
April 11	Lockhart	Florida	1	3	4	Four men were shot, one fatally, near an apartment complex during the evening hours in a targeted attack.
April 10	Washington (4)	District of Columbia	1	5	6	One man was killed and five others injured, including two children, in Northeast DC.
April 9	Tampa (1)	Florida	0	4	4	Three women were injured after a verbal altercation between two groups of teenagers escalated into a shooting near Armature Works in Tampa Heights. A teenager who was involved in the shooting was also injured and later arrested.
April 7	Oklahoma City (1)	Oklahoma	1	3	4	Four bystanders to a fight in an event center parking lot in the Grand Portland neighborhood were shot, with one woman being killed.
April 7	Washington (3)	District of Columbia	0	4	4	Three men and a woman were shot in the Bellevue neighborhood of Southwest DC during the evening hours.
April 7	San Antonio (2)	Texas	0	6	6	Six people, including three teenagers, were struck by gunfire in an event center parking lot in Uptown when they were fired upon from across the street.
April 6	Stockton	California	1	3	4	A man was found in a car suffering a gunshot wound following reports of shots fired. Shortly afterwards, police engaged in a chase with a car believed to be involved with the previous shooting and after the vehicle was stopped, three teenagers were found inside injured. A teenage boy later died from his injuries.
April 6	Doral	Florida	2	7	9	During a fight at a nightclub in the CityPlace Doral mall, a man pulled out a gun and shot a security guard who attempted to intervene, killing him. The man and the security team got into a shootout, ending with the gunman killed and seven people, including a police officer, wounded.
April 5	North Little Rock	Arkansas	1	3	4	A man fatally shot a woman in a car and injured three others in a domestic violence incident. The shooter was located by a police dog in an abandoned house and arrested.
April 5	Riviera Beach	Florida	0	4	4	Three adults and a juvenile were shot at an intersection during the evening hours.
April 2	Des Moines	Iowa	1	3	4	A shooting at an apartment complex in the McKinley School/Columbus Park neighborhood shortly before midnight killed one and injured three.
April 1	Eastpointe	Michigan	0	4	4	A victim's car was rammed into and at least one occupant in the ramming vehicle then opened fire, wounding four, including a pregnant woman.
March 31	Jacksonville (1)	Florida	3	1	4	An argument between a son and father turned into a shooting in which the son killed the father and one of his brothers and wounded his mother before taking his own life in the Duclay neighborhood of Westside.
March 31	Paris	Texas	0	4	4	A fight between two men at a block party being held at a government housing complex turned into a shooting that injured four during the early morning hours.
March 31	St. Petersburg	Florida	0	4	4	An argument in a bar in the United Central neighborhood escalated into a shooting that injured four, including a 17-year-old girl.
March 31	Jackson (2)	Mississippi	0	5	5	A young adult woman opened fire at a birthday party at a park in Belhaven due to a fight and injured four, including an eight-year-old and a teenager. The shooter accidentally shot herself as well.
March 31	Jackson (1)	Mississippi	1	3	4	An altercation among a group of young men at a gas station escalated into a shooting that killed one and injured three during the early morning hours.
March 31	Nashville (2)	Tennessee	1	5	6	A man opened fire on an Alabama family for "invading" his "personal space" at a restaurant in the Salemtown neighborhood. The shooter killed another man and injured five others before fleeing, and he was later arrested two days later in Princeton, Kentucky.
March 31	Dublin	Georgia	2	5	7	Two people were killed and five others were injured in a suspected gang shooting. Three men were later arrested in connection to the shooting.
March 31	Chicago (5)	Illinois	1	3	4	A 16-year-old boy was fatally shot in the head and three men were injured when two people got out of a car and opened fire on them in the Austin neighborhood on the city's west side.
March 30	Indianapolis (4)	Indiana	0	7	7	Seven young people between the ages of 12 and 17-years-old were shot outside the Circle Centre Mall in Downtown Indianapolis.
March 30	Bridgeport	Connecticut	2	2	4	Four people were shot, two fatally, in the East End neighborhood.
March 29	Sparks	Nevada	1	3	4	A man shot and wounded a police officer during a traffic stop, then invaded a home and shot at officers, wounding two. The suspect and officers exchanged gunfire, during which time the suspect was killed.
March 29	Mobile (1)	Alabama	1	4	5	A man was killed and four others were injured when a group drove a car into the backyard of a home and opened fire in the Rickarby neighborhood.
March 29	Detroit (1)	Michigan	0	5	5	Five people were shot in a dispute over a parking space at a blues club in the Barton-McFarland neighborhood on the city's west side.
March 27	Houston (2)	Texas	1	3	4	A dispute between two families escalated when a person opened fire with a rifle in the Fifth Ward, killing a woman and injuring three others.
March 25	Pompano Beach	Florida	1	3	4	A 16-year-old was killed and three others were injured in a shooting near a convenience store during the late afternoon.
March 24	Indianapolis (3)	Indiana	1	5	6	Three men and two women were injured when a shooting occurred in a bar parking lot near east Washington Street just after midnight. Two police officers exchanged gunfire with a suspect and mortally wounded the man.
March 23	Thomasville	North Carolina	1	3	4	A man was killed and three others were injured in a shooting during the late afternoon in a neighborhood.
March 22	New Orleans (2)	Louisiana	2	2	4	Two men were killed and two others were injured when they were fired upon from a pickup truck near an intersection in the Seventh Ward as they sat outside on lawn chairs.
March 21	Huntington	West Virginia	3	1	4	A man fatally shot two women, including his wife, and injured a toddler at a home. The man later fatally shot himself on the bank of the Ohio River near McClelland Park.
March 17	Washington (2)	District of Columbia	2	5	7	Two people were killed and five others were injured in an early morning shooting in the Shaw neighborhood of Northwest DC.
March 16	Manteca	California	0	4	4	Shortly before midnight, a bar fight erupted and then spilled out into the parking lot where a shooting occurred, leaving four injured.
March 16	Montgomery (2)	Alabama	1	3	4	Four men were shot, one fatally, in southern Montgomery shortly before midnight.
March 16	El Paso	Texas	1	3	4	A shooting during the early morning hours at a bar in the Vista Del Sol West area of East El Paso killed a man and injured three others.
March 16	Euclid (1)	Ohio	0	4	4	Four people were shot, including one who was also hit by a car, and one other person was injured when a shooting erupted at a gathering at a business during the early morning hours.
March 16	Indianapolis (2)	Indiana	1	5	6	A person was killed and five others were injured in a shooting at a bar in the Broad Ripple neighborhood not too long after midnight.
March 14	Memphis (2)	Tennessee	1	4	5	A street fight among a group of children in South Memphis escalated when a man shot an armed woman, killing her, and injured three children. The slain woman's daughter then grabbed her mother's gun and shot the man who killed her.
March 12	North Las Vegas (1)	Nevada	4	0	4	A 43-year-old man was fatally shot by police after he shot and killed three women and a dog at an apartment.
March 12	Bradford County	Florida	3	1	4	A 46-year-old man fatally shot his girlfriend and her two adult daughters and injured her granddaughter in a domestic violence incident at a home south of Lawtey.
March 10	Nashville (1)	Tennessee	1	3	4	A 25-year-old man who formerly resided at an apartment in Antioch showed up armed at it and opened fire, wounding two women and a young boy on the boy's birthday before fatally shooting himself.
March 10	Sumter	South Carolina	0	4	4	Four people were injured in a shooting at a bar and grill.
March 10	Shreveport (1)	Louisiana	1	3	4	Multiple shooters are believed to have shot four men outside a closed CVS Pharmacy in the Sunset Acres neighborhood. The following day, a 22-year-old man died from his injuries at a hospital.
March 10	Jonesboro	Arkansas	3	5	8	A man fatally shot two and injured five others in a domestic incident at a house party before committing suicide.
March 8	San Antonio (1)	Texas	4	0	4	A man shot and killed his wife and two children. He killed himself after setting his house on fire.
March 7	Goldsboro	North Carolina	0	4	4	A suspect was arrested and charged with attempted murder after wounding four people, including a one-year-old boy.
March 6	Philadelphia (3)	Pennsylvania	0	8	8	Eight Northeast High School students were shot while waiting at a bus stop when three people in a car pulled up and opened fire on them in the city's northeast side.
March 4	Philadelphia (2)	Pennsylvania	1	4	5	A student from Imhotep Institute Charter High School was killed and four others were injured at a SEPTA bus stop in the Ogontz neighborhood when two people opened fire on them.
March 4	Sonoma County	California	1	4	5	Four deputies were shot while chasing a man in a car near Santa Rosa. The suspect then crashed and died.
March 3	Clay County	Mississippi	1	12	13	At least three people opened fire at a nightclub north of West Point shortly after midnight, killing a woman and injuring twelve others.
March 3	King City	California	4	7	11	Four adults were killed and seven others were injured in a suspected gang shooting at a house party.
March 2	Sherrelwood	Colorado	0	5	5	Two strangers opened fire at a birthday party at a sports bar, injuring each other as well as three others, including a teenager.
March 2	Pembroke	North Carolina	2	4	6	Two people were killed and four others were injured after a fight escalated into a shooting at an apartment complex frequented by University of North Carolina at Pembroke students. A teenage student was among the dead.
March 2	Houston (1)	Texas	0	4	4	Four people were injured outside a Washington Corridor club after a fight between patrons and security guards escalated.
March 2	Natchez	Louisiana	1	3	4	A group of four were fired upon as they drove away from an apartment complex, killing a teenager and wounding three others, and causing them to crash.
February 29	Lexington	Missouri	1	3	4	A teenage boy opened fire on three other teenage boys at an apartment complex, killing one and injuring the others. He injured himself in the process.
February 29	Independence	Missouri	2	3	5	A police officer and civil process server were killed and two other police officers were injured when a man opened fire during an attempted eviction at a residence. The man was injured in an exchange of gunfire and arrested.
February 28	Country Club	Florida	4	0	4	A man fatally shot his wife and their two children before committing suicide at an apartment. Their bodies were not found for about two weeks.
February 28	Orlando (1)	Florida	1	6	7	One person was killed and six were injured in the Rosemont neighborhood after an argument over a vehicle escalated.
February 27	Minneapolis (1)	Minnesota	1	3	4	Multiple shooters opened fire in the Ventura Village neighborhood, killing a man and injuring three others.
February 26	Louisville (2)	Kentucky	1	3	4	Four men were shot, one fatally, at an apartment complex in the Fern Creek neighborhood shortly before midnight.
February 26	Chicago (4)	Illinois	1	4	5	A dispute led to one person killed, and four others, including the suspect wounded in the Greater Grand Crossing neighborhood in the city's south side.
February 25	Point Hope	Alaska	2	2	4	A 16-year-old boy was taken into custody after killing two people and seriously injuring two others at a home.
February 25	Kansas City (4)	Missouri	1	3	4	An argument in a parking lot during the early morning led to a shooting that killed one and injured three others in the South Indian Mound neighborhood.
February 25	Milwaukee (1)	Wisconsin	3	1	4	After a domestic violence incident turned into a fight, multiple people pulled out firearms and began firing at each other. A 28-year-old man and 21-year-old woman were killed and two others were injured. The shooting occurred in the Sherman Park neighborhood on the city's northwest side. On February 29, a 39-year-old man succumbed from his injuries at a hospital.
February 25	Chicago (3)	Illinois	3	1	4	Two unidentified gunmen fatally shot three males and injured a teenage boy inside a residence in the West Chatham district in the Chatham neighborhood on the city's south side.
February 25	Chicago (2)	Illinois	1	3	4	A teenager was fatally shot and three others, including another teenager, were injured when two people opened fire upon them in Pottawattomie Park in the Rogers Park neighborhood in the city's north side.
February 24	Frisco City	Alabama	0	6	6	Six people were injured, two critically, when a fight broke out at a bonfire. One 25-year-old man is facing two counts of attempted murder while another man has been arrested.
February 24	Pittsburgh (1)	Pennsylvania	1	3	4	A man was killed and three others were injured near a bar after a dispute in the Marshall-Shadeland neighborhood on the city's North Side.
February 20	Allentown (1)	Pennsylvania	0	4	4	A man fired into a crowd outside a home in the West Park neighborhood, striking four.
February 19	Indianapolis (1)	Indiana	1	5	6	One person was killed and five were injured when an altercation escalated at a Waffle House in the city's southwest side.
February 18	Middleton	Wisconsin	3	1	4	A woman fatally shot her two children and injured their father before fatally shooting herself at an apartment complex in the Maywood neighborhood.
February 18	Carson	California	0	4	4	Four people were injured in a shooting at a warehouse party.
February 18	Montgomery (1)	Alabama	1	3	4	A man was killed and another man and two women were injured in a shooting at a home. A suspect has been charged with one count of murder.
February 18	New York City (3)	New York	0	4	4	Four people were injured when a man opened fire outside a bar on Adam Clayton Powell Jr. Boulevard in Harlem.
February 18	Burnsville (1)	Minnesota	4	1	5	2024 Burnsville shooting: Police and medics were fired upon from a home while responding to a domestic incident. Two officers and a firefighter were killed while another officer suffered a gunshot wound. After opening fire on first responders, the shooter fatally shot himself.
February 16	Birmingham (1)	Alabama	4	0	4	Four people were fatally shot at a car wash in the College Hills neighborhood.
February 15	Fayetteville	Arkansas	1	4	5	One man was killed and four others were injured after an argument escalated into a shootout in the parking lot of an environmental center. The perpetrator received a sentence of 13 years in prison.
February 14	Atlanta (1)	Georgia	0	4	4	Four people were injured at Benjamin Elijah Mays High School in a drive-by shooting.
February 14	Kansas City (3)	Missouri	1	21	22	2024 Kansas City parade shooting: A DJ for KKFI was killed and twenty-one others, including at least nine children, were injured in a shooting outside of Kansas City Union Station at the end of the Super Bowl LVIII victory parade for the Kansas City Chiefs. The shooting stemmed from an argument among four males, with one man opening fire on three of the others, prompting a shootout in which one of the other men fired the fatal bullet. At least two of the shooters were injured.
February 14	Evans County	Georgia	2	2	4	Two people were killed and two others were injured in a morning motel shooting outside of Claxton.
February 13	Baltimore (2)	Maryland	0	4	4	Four people were shot in the Johnstone Square neighborhood.
February 12	Toa Baja	Puerto Rico	5	3	8	Five people were killed and four others were critically injured in a shooting at a streetside bar.
February 12	New York City (2)	New York	1	5	6	One person was killed and five others injured after a fight turned into a shooting at the Mount Eden Avenue station in the Highbridge neighborhood of The Bronx.
February 11–12	Huntington Park, Florence-Graham, & Cudahy	California	4	1	5	Three males went on an apparent random shooting spree in Los Angeles County, killing four, including a teenager, and wounding another teenager.
February 11	Jackson (1)	Tennessee	1	4	5	A man shot four people inside a bar before being fatally shot by a responding police officer.
February 11	Chicago (1)	Illinois	0	7	7	An argument in the Little Village neighborhood in the city's west side led to a man shooting a woman and firing into a crowd, striking six others.
February 9	Washington (1)	District of Columbia	1	3	4	One man was killed and three others were injured in a shooting in the Trinidad neighborhood of Northeast DC.
February 9	Dallas (1)	Texas	0	5	5	Five people, including two juveniles, were shot in an apartment complex parking lot in southern Dallas.
February 7	East Lansdowne	Pennsylvania	6	2	8	2024 East Lansdowne shooting: A man killed his niece and shot two police officers before setting his house on fire, killing himself and four other relatives who were trapped inside.
February 6	Gurabo	Puerto Rico	3	4	7	Seven people were shot in front of a liquor store.
February 4	Denver (1)	Colorado	2	4	6	Two people were killed and four others were injured in an early morning shooting in the Green Valley Ranch neighborhood.
January 31	Alexandria (1)	Louisiana	0	5	5	Five people were shot at multiple locations over a narcotics dispute.
January 31	Louisville (1)	Kentucky	1	3	4	A shooting in the Russell neighborhood left one man dead and three others injured.
January 30	Grenada (2)	Mississippi	0	4	4	At least one person fired into a window of an apartment, injuring four inside.
January 30	Gwinnett County (1)	Georgia	3	1	4	A man shot and injured his partner and killed two others before killing himself at an apartment complex southwest of Snellville.
January 28	Memphis (1)	Tennessee	2	2	4	Two people were killed and two were injured in a shooting at a home in northeast Memphis.
January 28	Compton (2)	California	0	4	4	Four people were injured in a shooting during a street takeover in the late evening.
January 28	Harrisburg (1)	Pennsylvania	0	4	4	Four people were injured in a shooting near an intersection in southeast Harrisburg.
January 28	Palm Bay (2)	Florida	4	2	6	A man killed three people before injuring two police officers in a shootout. He was killed after getting in a chase with additional police officers.
January 27	Grenada (1)	Mississippi	1	3	4	A spree of connected shootings during the early morning in which at least one person shot into four different residences killed one and injured three, including a child.
January 27	Los Angeles (2)	California	4	0	4	A man opened fire at a home in the Granada Hills neighborhood, killing his wife, son, and daughter before fatally shooting himself.
January 27	Kings Mountain	North Carolina	1	3	4	A woman was killed and three others were injured in a shooting at an intersection.
January 27	Charlotte (1)	North Carolina	3	1	4	A fight in the parking lot of an apartment complex in the Montclaire South neighborhood escalated into a shooting that killed three and injured one other.
January 25	Kansas City (2)	Missouri	0	4	4	Four people were injured, including a teenager who was put in critical condition, in a shooting in the Santa Fe neighborhood of the East Side.
January 24	Yauco	Puerto Rico	4	0	4	A man shot and killed his ex-girlfriend, her brother, and her mother before killing himself at a relative's house.
January 24	New Orleans (1)	Louisiana	1	3	4	A shooting during the early morning left a man dead and three others injured, including two juveniles, in the Algiers neighborhood.
January 23	San Bernardino County	California	6	0	6	Six people were found shot to death in a dispute over illegal marijuana in a remote part of the Mojave Desert off U.S. Route 395 northwest of Adelanto. Five people have been arrested.
January 21	Preston Heights & Joliet	Illinois	9	1	10	2024 Joliet shootings: A man opened fire at four different locations in the Joliet area of Will County, including at two homes. A total of eight people, mostly family members of the shooter, were killed and one person was injured. The suspect fatally shot himself in a confrontation with law enforcement officials near Natalia, Texas a day later.
January 21	Harris County (2)	Texas	3	2	5	Three people were killed and two were injured in a short-term rental property northeast of Katy.
January 21	Tinley Park	Illinois	4	0	4	A man killed his wife and three adult daughters in his home.
January 21	New York City (1)	New York	1	3	4	A man was killed and three others were injured in a shooting at a restaurant in the Wakefield neighborhood of the Bronx.
January 20	Plantation	Florida	1	3	4	Four people were injured in a parking lot shooting. One of the victims later died from their injuries.
January 20	Palm Bay (1)	Florida	3	2	5	A man killed three people and wounded two others, including a teenager, at an apartment complex. He was later arrested in Melbourne.
January 20	Coraopolis	Pennsylvania	1	3	4	A man was killed and three others were injured in a shooting at a bar during the early morning hours.
January 20	Tuscaloosa County (1)	Alabama	1	3	4	A shooting at a gathering near Buhl left a man dead and three others injured.
January 19	Baltimore (1)	Maryland	3	1	4	An argument at a business in the Woodmere neighborhood led to a shooting that killed three and injured one.
January 18	San Francisco	California	1	4	5	One person was killed and four others were injured during a shooting in the Tenderloin District.
January 17	Las Vegas	Nevada	2	2	4	Two people were killed and two others were injured in a shooting after an altercation between multiple individuals escalated in Downtown Las Vegas.
January 17	Kansas City (1)	Missouri	0	6	6	A man shot and injured six people at the Crown Center mall after an argument.
January 17	Union Township	New Jersey	4	0	4	A woman fatally shot her husband and two daughters before committing suicide.
January 16	Ceiba	Puerto Rico	5	0	5	Five people, including a 16-year-old boy, were killed in a drive-by shooting motivated by drug trafficking.
January 14	West Point	Mississippi	2	3	5	Multiple shooters opened fire at two different locations a block apart, including at a hospital where a teenager was killed. In total, two were killed and three were injured.
January 14	Harris County (1)	Texas	0	4	4	Four teenagers were injured during a shooting at a party at a warehouse southeast of Aldine.
January 14	Philadelphia (1)	Pennsylvania	2	4	6	Two people were killed and four others were injured in the Strawberry Mansion neighborhood of North Philadelphia.
January 13	Fort Bend County	Texas	5	0	5	A man killed his estranged wife and three other family members, including his eight-year-old niece, at a home southwest of Four Corners before committing suicide.
January 11	Compton (1)	California	0	5	5	A man injured five people at an intersection in a drive-by shooting that is thought to be gang-related.
January 9	Portsmouth	Virginia	2	2	4	Two people were killed and three others were injured after an argument led to a shooting.
January 7	Henry County	Alabama	0	4	4	Four people were shot and two to three other people were hurt while fleeing a shootout during a party near Abbeville.
January 6	Reedley	California	4	0	4	A teenager fatally shot four of his neighbors at their home and robbed the house of its firearms before attempting to hide two of the victim's bodies with the help of his mother.
January 4	Baton Rouge (2)	Louisiana	1	5	6	Multiple shooters opened fire outside of an apartment complex from a car, killing one person and injuring five others.
January 4	Perry	Iowa	3	6	9	Perry High School shooting: One student was killed and four other students and three staff members were injured at Perry High School. The shooter, a 17-year-old student at the school, committed suicide. One of the people who was shot died from his injuries on January 14.
January 2	Cicero (1)	Illinois	3	1	4	A man fatally shot his girlfriend and her cousin and injured his infant son before killing himself.
January 1	Maywood	Illinois	2	2	4	A man fatally shot a teenager and another man and injured two other men.
January 1	Halawa and Honolulu	Hawaii	1	3	4	A man wanted for shooting a man and stabbing another on December 16, 2023, in the Kalihi neighborhood of Honolulu shot a woman on the interstate in Halawa on New Years and stole her car. Officers attempted to apprehend the man in Kalihi, but he opened fire and successfully escaped. He then stole another woman's car at gunpoint after crashing near Kaneohe and drove back to Honolulu. The man then shot two police officers before being killed in the Manoa neighborhood.
January 1	Orange (1)	Texas	4	0	4	A man fatally shot three of his family members at a house before turning the gun on himself.
January 1	Baton Rouge (1)	Louisiana	1	4	5	A teenager was killed and four other people were injured in a drive-by shooting spanning a six-block radius.
January 1	Greene County	Missouri	0	4	4	Four people were shot at an event center. While investigators initially said a security guard shot them, it was later stated that he did not shoot any of the victims.
January 1	Los Angeles (1)	California	2	8	10	Two people were killed and eight others were injured when a fight occurred at a New Year's party in Downtown Los Angeles.

== Monthly statistics ==
2024 US mass shooting statistics by month
Month	Mass shootings	Total number dead (including the shooter/s)	Total number wounded (including the shooter/s)	Occurred at a school or university	Occurred at a place of worship	Total days without mass shootings
January	47	100	124	1	0	9
February	37	62	136	1	0	12
March	44	54	165	0	0	11
April	46	44	208	0	0	7
May	53	62	211	0	0	12
June	79	80	383	0	0	7
July	69	78	320	0	0	4
August	60	54	228	1	0	5
September	50	48	190	2	0	10
October	31	29	156	2	0	13
November	35	44	138	1	0	11
December	39	63	136	1	0	6
Total	587	712	2,389	9	0	109

== State/territory statistics ==
State	Number of shootings
FL, CA	40
IL	39
TX	36
PA	31
AL, GA	29
MO	25
MS	24
LA	23

This table is based on the above list as of December 31, 2024.
