= 2023 shooting of Fargo police officers =

Mass shooting in North Dakota, U.S.

- Location: 25th Street and Ninth Avenue South, Fargo, North Dakota, United States
- Date: July 14, 2023; 3 years ago 3:04 – 3:06 p.m. (CT)
- Target: Fargo police officers
- Attack type: Mass shooting, shootout, ambush
- Weapons: .223 Remington Anderson Manufacturing AM-15 AR-15–style semi-automatic rifle; 2 handguns (both carried, one brandished, both unfired)
- Deaths: 2 (including the perpetrator)
- Injuries: 3
- Perpetrator: Mohamad Barakat
- Motive: Unknown

On July 14, 2023, 37-year-old Mohamad Barakat opened fire on a group of police officers who were responding to an unrelated traffic collision in Fargo, North Dakota. Police officer Jake Wallin was killed, officers Andrew Dotas, Tyler Hawes, and a civilian bystander were injured, before Barakat was killed in a shootout with another police officer, Zach Robinson.

== Background ==
Barakat was observed on a security camera he had installed in his apartment in the hours before the shooting, which showed him preparing for the attack. On the evening of July 13, 2023, he was seen checking his apartment door with a handgun, assembling a short-barrelled shotgun, and, at midnight, holding the Quran.

On the morning of July 14, he was seen using his computer to access footage from trail cameras and deleted some files. Later, he is shown handling several firearms and putting on his tactical vest a few times. He then packs the equipment and weapons into a suitcase, a rifle case and a bag. Barakat left the apartment and secured the door with a strap. North Dakota Attorney General Drew Wrigley suggested the strap was most likely used so Barakat could tell if anyone had entered his apartment, with Wrigley postulating that Barakat may have intended to return to his apartment after the shooting.

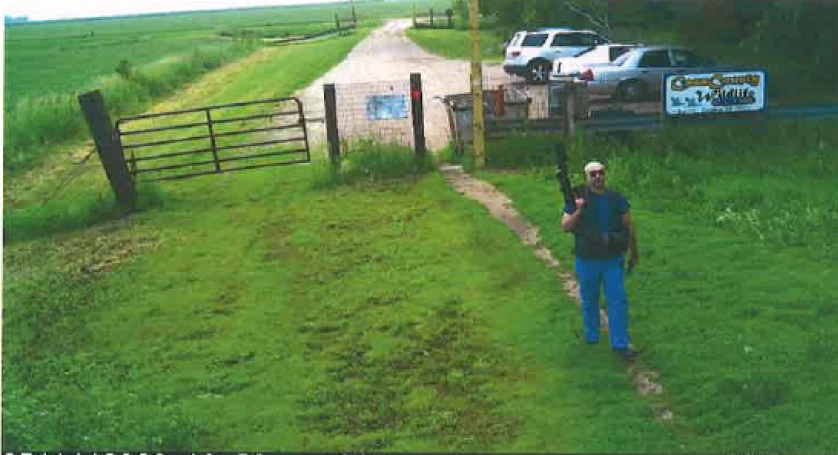
CCTV still of Barakat at a shooting range on July 14, 2023

Barakat then loaded the guns in the garage before leaving at around 10:20 a.m. to visit a shooting range he frequented in Casselton. Barakat spent about 20 minutes at the shooting range and then bought gasoline and cigarettes at a convenience store and a soda at a dollar store.

Barakat drove around Fargo and returned to his apartment several times throughout the day, checking the strap he used to secure his door. At around 2:30 p.m., Barakat was observed arguing with a property manager on the surveillance cameras of the apartment building. The subject of the argument is not publicly known.

Separately, at around 2:40 p.m., a vehicle accident occurred on 25th Street and Ninth Avenue South, which prompted a small emergency response of police and firefighters.

Barakat left his apartment for a final time at 2:46 p.m., heading north on 25th Street, where he encountered the vehicle accident. Barakat circled the scene for about 15 minutes before he parked in a lot adjacent to the site and waited in his car. Three police officers began a routine investigation in the area of the parking lot, and walked in the direction of Barakat's parked vehicle.

== Shooting ==
At around 3:04 p.m., when police officers began approaching the direction of his vehicle, Barakat fired a .223-caliber rifle equipped with a binary trigger out of his driver-side car window. Officers Andrew Dotas and Tyler Hawes were immediately incapacitated by multiple gunshot wounds and could be seen laying motionless on bodycam footage, critically injured, while Officer Jake Wallin was killed by a single shot from Barakat. He then opened fire on bystander Karlee Koswick. Subsequently, Barakat exited his vehicle, wearing a tactical vest carrying several magazines and two handguns. He fired several more shots towards Koswick, whereupon she collapsed, having sustained two gunshot wounds. The binary trigger on Barakat's semi-automatic rifle enabled rapid gunfire against the officers, which led Officer Robinson to believe he had an "AK-47".

A fourth police officer, Officer Zach Robinson, who was approximately 75 feet away and uninjured in the initial barrage of gunfire, then engaged Barakat in a brief shootout. Robinson, using a vehicle involved in the traffic accident for cover, eventually struck Barakat and effectively disabled his rifle by hitting its magazine. Barakat collapsed to the ground wounded and brandished one of his handguns, despite repeated demands from Robinson to drop his weapons. As Barakat continued to aim his handgun, Robinson fired five more shots at Barakat, killing him. Robinson fired a total of 31 rounds during the altercation, 21 of which struck Barakat.

== Victims ==
=== Killed ===
- Fargo Police Officer Jake Wallin

=== Injured ===
- Fargo Police Officer Andrew Dotas
- Fargo Police Officer Tyler Hawes
- Karlee Koswick (bystander)

== Perpetrator ==
The perpetrator was Mohamad Barakat, a 37-year-old Syrian national who was born in 1986, came to the U.S. as an asylum seeker in 2012, and became a U.S. citizen in 2019. Barakat worked "odd jobs" and at one point trained to be an emergency responder at a local college. In 2016, he claimed he was training to be a dentist. Though Barakat reportedly had family in the U.S., they did not live in the Fargo area and he did not have contact with them. Barakat did not have a criminal record and obtained the firearms used in the shooting legally. Barakat was not known to be an active member of the Muslim community in Fargo, had no friends, had no social media presence, and was essentially described as a loner.

No clear motive has been established for the ambush or any other potential plot Barakat may have planned. Barakat's search history included articles about Syrian refugees, immigration arrests and drone strikes in Syria, though no indication was found of a political or religious motive or any connection to a terrorist group. Forensic analysis of Barakat's computer revealed that he had searched online for the terms "kill fast", "explosive ammo", "incendiary rounds", "mass shooting events", and "area events where there are crowds", as well as information on the Red River Valley Fair. Investigators have suggested that Barakat likely intended to carry out a larger attack based on the amount of weapons and ammunition he had, but may have decided to open fire on the police officers to create a diversion. Both the Downtown Fargo Street Fair and the Red River Valley Fair were ongoing at the time of the ambush, and attracted hundreds of visitors.

Barakat was wearing a tactical vest carrying several magazines and used a .223-caliber rifle equipped with a binary trigger and double-stacked high-capacity magazines, which were capable of holding up to 60 rounds, in the attack. He also had two handguns on his person, one of which he drew but did not fire in the attack. A search of Barakat's vehicle, which he had spray-painted the back windows of, after the shooting discovered seven additional guns, 1,800 rounds of ammunition, a homemade grenade, three gasoline containers, and two propane tanks filled with a homemade explosive compound similar to Tannerite.

=== Previous encounters with law enforcement ===
In July, 2016, Barakat gave up several of his own firearms to the Cass County Sheriff's Office. Barakat said he bought the guns "in an attempt to fit in" after co-workers had asked him if he liked hunting or shooting, but decided that he did not enjoy shooting after trying it. Barakat also stated that "the current state of affairs in the world" convinced him to dispose of the guns, telling officers he was a Muslim from Syria and did not want to be suspected as a violent person by the government. Barakat told officers that he was not able to return the guns to the store he had bought them from as the store said "all sales were final." Despite being suggested alternative ways to dispose of the firearms, Barakat insisted that the sheriff's office take the guns and sell them as a donation. The sheriff's office accepted the four guns, a Mossberg 500 Cruiser shotgun, a Mossberg Patriot rifle hunting package, a Remington Model 870 and an Izhmash Saiga rifle, valued at $1,512.

In 2021, the FBI received an anonymous tip about Barakat from a woman in Minnesota, who raised concerns about his large collection of firearms, his mental state and his alleged use of threatening language. She claimed that Barakat was "mentally unstable", knew him to use anti-LGBTQ and racial slurs, and was worried he would "become a mass shooter." This information was forwarded to the Fargo Police Department, who interviewed Barakat, but took no further action due to a lack of evidence regarding any illegal activity. In the interview, Barakat "denied any ill-intentions."

In 2022, Barakat was again interviewed by police following a fire in his apartment kitchen, when responding firefighters reported the large amount of firearms, ammunition and explosive materials in his home. Police found that all firearms were legally obtained and he was not prohibited from owning any of the items of concern, so no further action was taken.

In May, 2023, Barakat had an encounter with a Cass County deputy after he shot at explosive Tannerite targets at a Casselton firing range, which prompted concerned calls from neighbors who thought a "cannon" may have been being used due to the loud bangs. The range did not allow such targets, so Barakat was warned and was made to dump the explosive compounds, as federal law did not allow their transport after being mixed.

== Aftermath ==
In March, 2024, North Dakota Attorney General Drew Wrigley announced that he would ask the ATF to destroy the rifle used in the shooting, as well as Barakat's other weapons and ammunition.

== See also ==
- 2024 Burnsville shooting
