= 2024 Fordyce shooting =

Mass shooting in Arkansas, U.S.

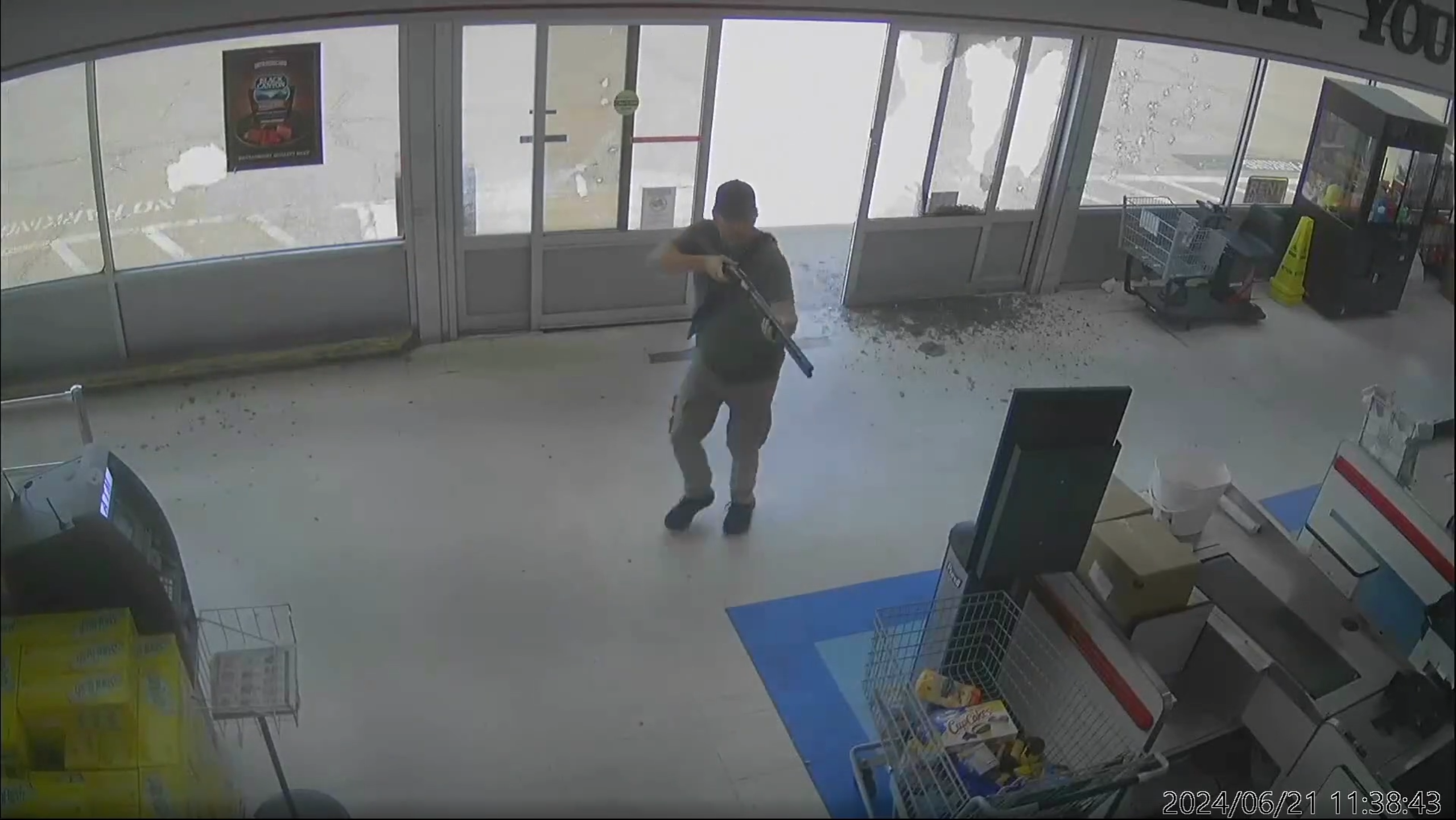
- CCTV still of Posey shooting inside the store
- Location: 33.813420°N 92.422147°W; Fordyce, Arkansas, U.S.
- Date: June 21, 2024; 11:38 a.m. (CDT; UTC−05:00)
- Attack type: Mass shooting, shootout, mass murder
- Weapons: 12-gauge Mossberg 500A pump-action shotgun; 9x19mm Smith and Wesson M&P Shield Plus semi-automatic pistol (unused)
- Deaths: 4
- Injuries: 12 (including the perpetrator)
- Perpetrator: Travis Eugene “Joey” Posey
- Motive: Undetermined
- Verdict: Guilty
- Convictions: Capital murder (x4); Attempted murder (x11)

On June 21, 2024, four people were killed and 11 others injured in a mass shooting at the Mad Butcher supermarket in Fordyce, Arkansas, United States. The perpetrator, 44-year-old Travis Eugene Posey of neighboring New Edinburg, was injured during a shootout with police before being taken into custody. On August 4, 2025, Posey was sentenced to four life sentences plus 220 years without parole. The incident had the highest number of casualties of any active shooter incident that year in the United States.

== Shooting ==
At 11:38 a.m. CDT, police received calls about an active shooter at the Mad Butcher supermarket. The shooting, carried out by 44-year-old Travis Posey, who was armed with a Mossberg 12-gauge shotgun and a 9mm semi-automatic pistol, and wore a bandolier, began in the supermarket's parking lot, close to U.S Route 79.

Just before the shooting began, Posey arrived in the parking lot in his pickup truck. He parked his truck at a parking space before stepping out and walking up to the supermarket's entrance. The first person to be shot was Roy Sturgis. Just before the shooting, Sturgis was exiting the supermarket after purchasing steak. Posey mortally wounded him just as he was outside the supermarket. Sturgis quickly ran to his vehicle and drove himself to a hospital, where he would succumb to his injuries. After shooting Sturgis, Posey fired through the windows and entrance of the supermarket, injuring two employees working in the checkout area. Posey then entered the supermarket. A man who witnessed the parking lot shootings ran into the store to stop Posey, but Posey quickly turned around and shot him in the head and upper body. The man ran out of the store and tried warning a passerby before falling unconscious from his injuries. Posey moved towards the back of the store and fatally shot Shirley Taylor. After shooting Taylor, Posey moved back towards the front of the store. He encountered Callie Weems, who was rendering aid to one of the victims in the checkout area. Posey fatally shot her before exiting the supermarket.

When six law enforcement officers arrived at the scene from the Dallas County Sheriff's Office and Fordyce Police Department, Posey exited the store and engaged in a shoot-out with officers in the parking lot. He shot and injured two of the officers before opening fire indiscriminately in the parking lot. He fatally shot Ellen Shrum as she was loading groceries into her car. He then began opening fire at parked and moving vehicles. He tried shooting at three moving vehicles, only wounding the drivers of two of the vehicles. Posey also wounded two other people in the parking lot. Afterwards, police officers critically injured Posey with several shots. Throughout the incident, Posey fired 37 shots from the shotgun while never using the pistol. As police arrested Posey, he repeatedly said the word "trust" and also only mentioned "God" when being asked if there were other people with him.

Three officers suffered non-life-threatening injuries during the ensuing shootout, and the suspect was grazed in the head. Two of the officers were wounded by gunfire. Posey was taken into custody after less than five minutes with non-life-threatening injuries. The shooter shot fifteen people, killing four and wounding eleven, whose injuries ranged from non-life-threatening to critical. The fourth victim died the following day.

== Victims ==
Four shoppers were killed as a result of the shooting, with one victim, 81-year-old Ellen Shrum, dying a day later. Roy Sturgis, 50, was shot when exiting the store. Callie Weems, a 23-year-old nurse, was killed while rendering aid to a shooting victim. A cousin of Weems ran into the Mad Butcher to try and help people inside, leading to him being shot in the head but he survived and was able to escape from the store. Shirley Kay Taylor, 63, was also killed inside of the store.

== Perpetrator ==
The Ouachita County Sheriff's Office identified the perpetrator as then 44-year-old Travis Eugene "Joey" Posey (born July 26, 1979), of neighboring New Edinburg, Arkansas. Posey lived in the area throughout his entire life, and at the time of the shooting, Posey was the owner of a Kingsland landscaping company which he operated since 2010 as well as a local trucking service. Earlier records show that Posey attended the University of Arkansas at Monticello in 1997.

Posey was once arrested while working as a trucker by the New York State Police and charged with a single fourth-degree criminal possession of a weapon charge near Watertown, New York, on November 14, 2011, after attempting to bring a weapon through the gates of Fort Drum, pleading guilty to a reduced charge of disorderly conduct and was released on a $200 fine. Police confiscated the gun, which was not registered in New York.

=== Criminal case ===
On June 25, 2024, Posey appeared in court for the first time, in which he pleaded not guilty to four counts of capital murder and 10 counts of attempted murder. A trial date of February 3, 2025 was set by Judge Spencer Singleton in Camden during the October 11 hearing for this case, while being held at Ouachita County Detention Center.

On July 21, 2025, Posey agreed to plead guilty to all four counts of capital murder as well as 11 counts of attempted capital murder, forcing a cancellation of the trial and replacing the trial with his sentencing. On August 4, 2025, Posey was sentenced to four consecutive life sentences without parole, plus 220 years, and was transported to Varner Supermax Unit that same day, where he is incarcerated per his sentence.

=== Civil case ===
In August 2024, Posey was sued by a woman who was injured in the shooting and her husband, seeking monetary damages for medical care, lost earnings and other expenses. Lawsuit was filed in state court. In July 2025, when Posey pleaded guilty to criminal charges against him, it was reported that attorneys for the woman have requested the judge to enter default judgement, since Posey hasn't responded to the complaint. On October 20, 2025, it was announced that plaintiffs had won $3.7 million civil judgement against Posey.

== Aftermath and response ==
On June 23, hundreds gathered outside the Mad Butcher to hold a candlelight vigil for the victims of the attack and candles with the names of the victims were left outside in order to honor them. Mad Butcher was temporarily closed as a result of the shooting as authorities carried out their investigation and repairs were made to the store. As Mad Butcher is the only grocery store in the area, multiple sites were set up as food distribution centers such as Fordyce High School.

Multiple state politicians and officials offered condolences for the victims and condemned the attack. Arkansas Governor Sarah Huckabee Sanders ordered flags to be lowered to half-staff on June 28 from sunrise to sunset in honor of the four dead. Sanders stated that the deaths were "a tragedy for the entire State of Arkansas".

Fordyce Mayor John MacNichol expressed shock over the attack, stating that, "I never dreamed of this happening in our town", but he also expressed gratitude for assistance that was given to the city from all over the state as a result of the attack. Dallas County Sheriff Mike Knoedl set up a fund to support the victims of the attack as well as the Fordyce police officer that was wounded while responding to it.

The owners of Mad Butcher, Kentucky-based Houchens Food Group, released a statement in which they expressed remorse for the attack, thanked law enforcement for their response, and promised full cooperation with the investigation. Houchens later announced that they were working with local and state food pantries by donating food in order to aid the Fordyce community until they are able to reopen the grocery store.

On July 2, the Mad Butcher reopened and according to store representatives they will temporarily have limited hours and will continue to work with local food pantries. Arkansas Attorney General Tim Griffin attended the reopening to show support for the community saying that, "there's a certain amount of healing that comes with retaking this ground that's so interwoven into the people's lives here in the community".

== See also ==
- List of mass shootings in the United States in 2024
