= 2024 Minneapolis shooting =

Mass shooting in Minnesota, U.S.

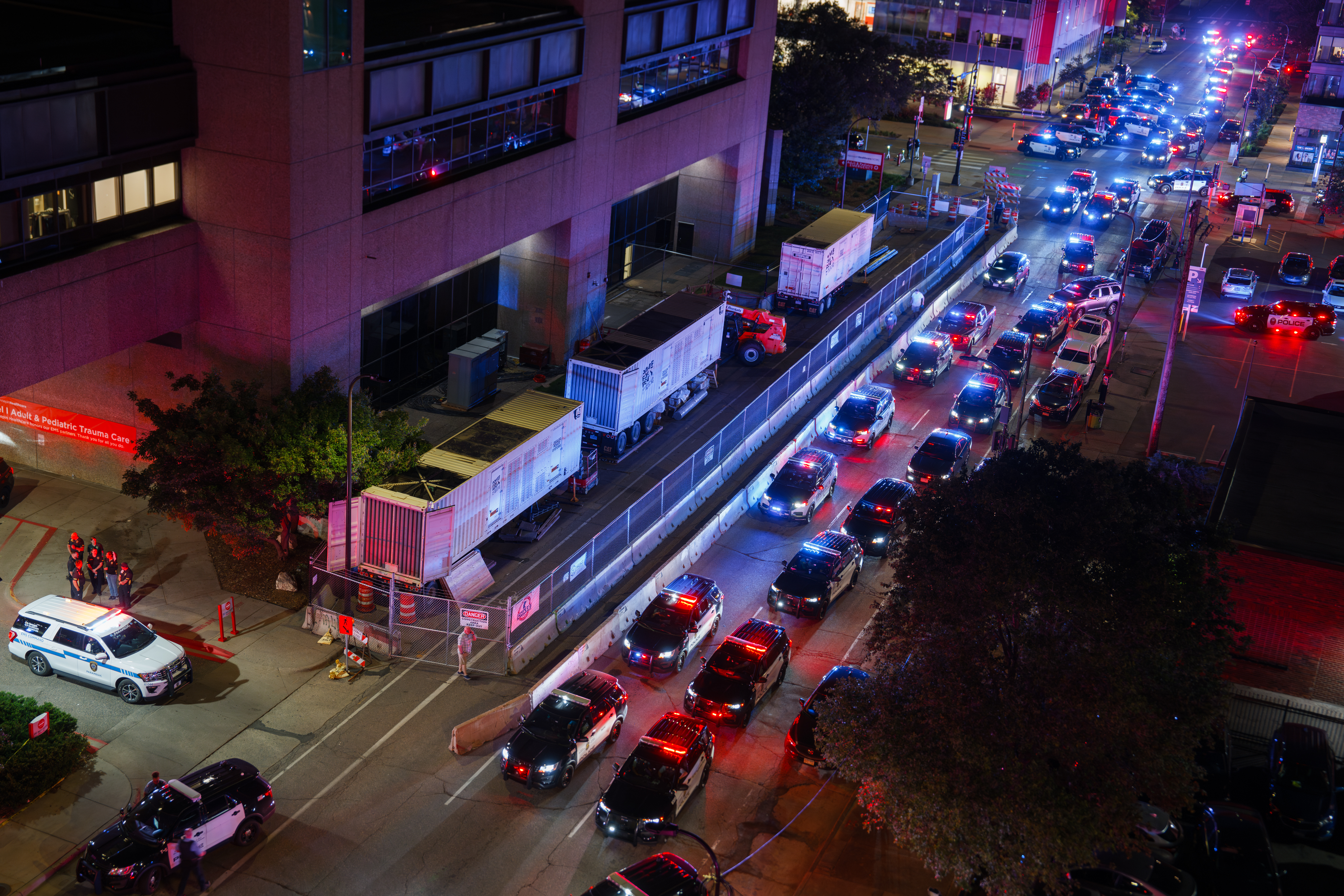
- A vehicle procession for Jamal Mitchell, a police officer who was killed in the line of duty on May 30, 2024.
- Approximate shooting location in Minneapolis.
- Location: 44.960887°N 93.279610°W; Minneapolis, Minnesota, U.S.
- Date: May 30, 2024; 2 years ago c. 5:15 p.m. (CDT)
- Attack type: Mass shooting, triple-murder
- Weapon: 9mm Glock 26 semi-automatic pistol
- Deaths: 4 (including the perpetrator)
- Injuries: 3
- Perpetrator: Mustafa Ahmed Mohamed

On May 30, 2024, a mass shooting occurred in the Whittier neighborhood of Minneapolis, Minnesota, United States. Four people were killed by gunfire: two civilians, Minneapolis Police Department officer Jamal Mitchell, and the gunman Mustafa Ahmed Mohamed. Three other people were injured by gunfire.

== Incident ==
The shooting began on the evening of May 30, 2024. Residents at an apartment building near the intersection of Blaisdell Avenue and West 22nd Avenue in Whittier, a neighborhood south of downtown Minneapolis, heard four or five gunshots. A bystander overheard a woman say that her boyfriend and another man had been shot.

At about 5:15 p.m. CDT, Minneapolis Police Department officers responded to reports that two people had been shot inside an apartment. Several police vehicles and ambulances arrived at the scene at about 5:20 p.m. Jamal Mitchell, an officer of the Minneapolis Police Department, was among the first responders to arrive at the scene. He was heading to the apartment building when he stopped his car about two blocks away. He said via a radio transmission that he observed two men with injuries, who were later identified as a wounded bystander and Mustafa Ahmed Mohamed.

Mitchell exited his police vehicle and approached Mohamed, who was sitting on the ground next to a parked vehicle on the 2100 block of Blaisdell Avenue. Mitchell asked Mohamed if he needed assistance. Mohamed pulled out a handgun and shot at Mitchell at close range. Mitchell fell to the ground and was incapacitated. Two other officers who arrived at the scene observed Mohamed repeatedly firing at Mitchell. Mohamed shot at the two officers, who then exchanged fire with him. One of the officers was struck by gunfire. Mohamed was killed at the scene by multiple gunshot wounds. A 38-year-old civilian sustained critical injuries while driving through an intersection on his way home from work. He was caught in the crossfire during the shootout.

Other police officers entered the apartment building and found two gunshot victims, a deceased person and another with life-threatening injuries. In response to the active shooter situation, police officers evacuated the building and kicked in several apartment doors in a search of the building.

=== Victims ===
Two civilians were killed by the initial gunfire inside the apartment building. Osman Said Jimale, a 32-year-old man, was found dead inside an apartment. According to the Hennepin County medical examiner, he had died of multiple gunshot wounds. Mohamed Bashir Aden, a 36-year-old man from Columbia Heights, was found inside the same apartment with life-threatening injuries and he was transported to a hospital. Aden died on June 7, 2024, from complications relating to multiple gunshot wounds, according to the medical examiner.

Two Minneapolis police officers and a firefighter with the Minneapolis Fire Department were struck during an exchange of gunfire. Jamal Mitchell, a 36-year old police officer was transported from the scene to nearby Hennepin County Medical Center where he died that night. According to the Hennepin County medical examiner, his death was the result of multiple gunshot wounds. The other police officer was treated at the hospital for non-life threatening injuries and released within a few days. The firefighter sustained non-life threatening injuries. A civilian bystander was also critically injured by gunfire.

=== Perpetrator ===
Authorities identified Mustafa Ahmed Mohamed (October 4, 1988 – May 30, 2024), a 35-year-old Minnesota resident, as the gunman who shot at Mitchell multiple times and was subsequently killed in an exchange of gunfire with police. At the time of the shootout, Mohamed had two active warrants for his arrest and he was ineligible to carry a firearm. Mohamed had been convicted of state burglary charges related to incidents in 2006 and 2007. He received a four-year sentence and was put on probation. In 2008, he was convicted of a state burglary charge in Minnesota and for violating the previous terms of his sentence; he received a 1½-year sentence that ran concurrently with his prior convictions. In 2009, he was convicted for vehicle tampering in Missouri, and back in Minnesota a few years later, Mohamed was convicted of federal charges in 2015 for felony possession of a stolen gun and received an eight-year sentence. He left prison in 2020 and was put on supervised release. In 2022, Mohamed was arrested after reports of a robbery in downtown Minneapolis when he was allegedly seen with a firearm, which violated the terms of his prior state sentence. Mohamed was released from custody on a non-cash bond while awaiting pending state criminal charges. Warrants were issued for his arrest when he failed to appear for a court hearing.

== Aftermath ==
Mitchell died as the Minneapolis Police Department was struggling to fill its ranks and improve public trust. At the time of his death, Mitchell was working a mandatory overtime shift assigned to a one-man squad. The shootout that led to his death occurred a few days after the fourth anniversary of the 2020 murder of George Floyd by a Minneapolis police officer and the protests over alleged racial injustice and police brutality that ensued. The city had become the center of the "defund the police” movement, though a ballot measure to abolish the city's police department failed in 2021. Mitchell's death was also part of an upward trend in reported attacks on law enforcement officers in Minnesota. Mitchell became the third Minnesota law enforcement officer to be killed in the same year, following the two officers who were killed in the suburban Burnsville shooting in February 2024.

=== Investigation ===
The Minnesota Bureau of Criminal Apprehension (BCA) was the lead government agency that investigated the incident. At a press conference on the evening of the shooting, BCA superintendent Drew Evans who viewed a video of the incident, described Mitchell's death as the result of an ambush-style attack. Police chief Brian O'Hara said Mitchell had stopped to help a man who appeared to be injured, but who instead shot him. The BCA released a preliminary report on June 2, 2024. The report said Mitchell was shot and killed by Mohamed and that two other officers exchanged gunfire with Mohamed killing him at the scene.

=== Memorials to Jamal Mitchell ===
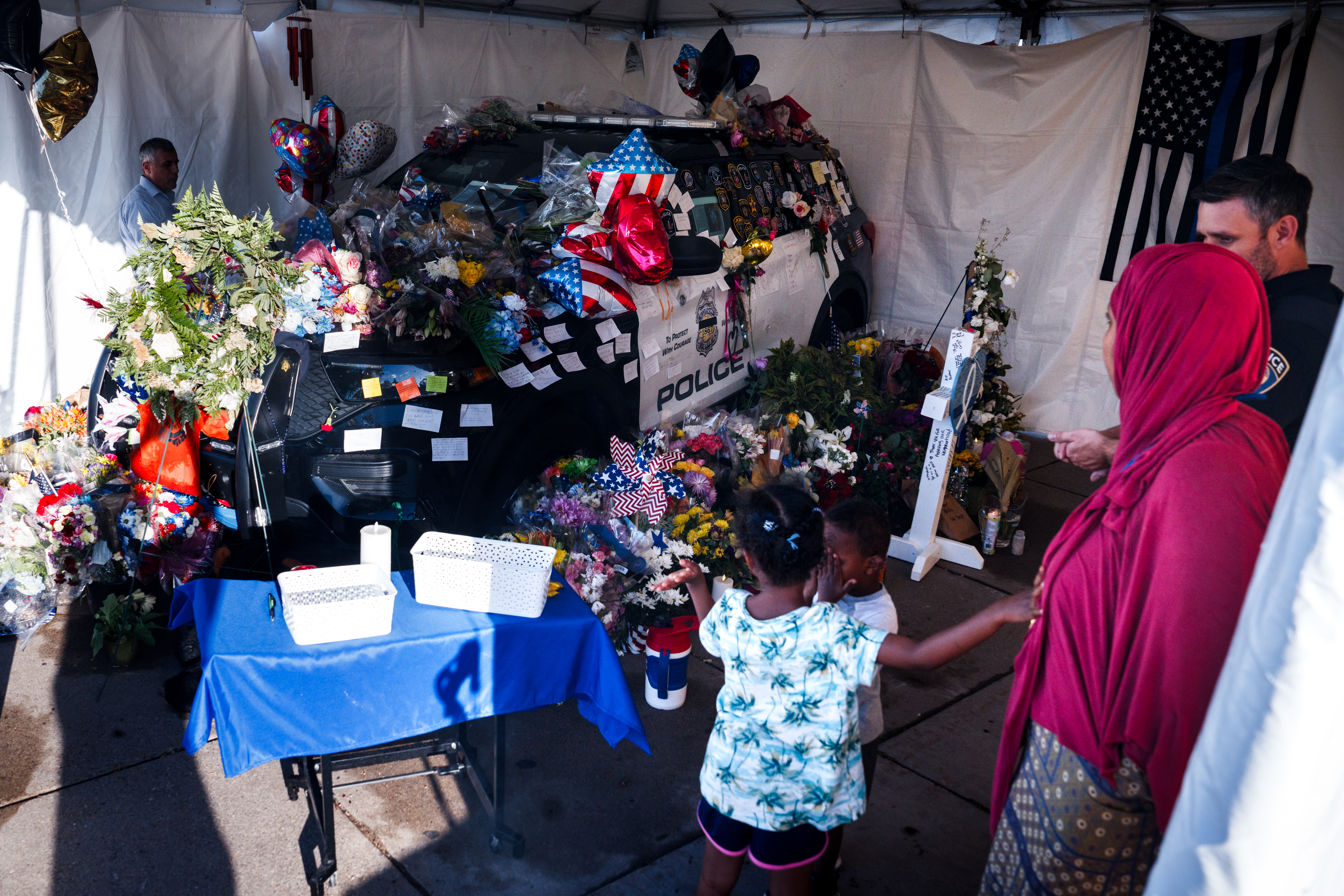
A memorial for Mitchell in Minneapolis

Minneapolis Police Department officers held a vehicle procession for Mitchell when his body was transferred from Hennepin County Medical Center to the Hennepin County medical examiner's office on the night of the shooting. A memorial was placed outside the Minneapolis Police Department's fifth precinct station. Minneapolis mayor Jacob Frey, police chief O'Hara, U.S. Representative Ilhan Omar, and several elected officers officials made public statements honoring Mitchell as a heroic figure. Several Minneapolis city councilors who were critical of the police department released statements about the shooting that did not use Mitchell's name or note that a police officer had been killed. Minnesota Governor Tim Walz ordered flags in the state to be flown at half-staff on May 31, 2024. Michell's death was compared to the last two Minneapolis police officers killed in the line of duty, Jerry Haaf in 1992 and Melissa Jayne Schmidt in 2002.

A public memorial service for Mitchell was held on June 11, 2024, at Maple Grove Senior High School. O'Hara posthumously awarded Mitchell a Medal of Honor and Purple Heart. Mitchell is to be buried in his home state of Connecticut.

== See also ==
- List of law enforcement officers killed in the line of duty in the United States
- List of mass shootings in the United States in 2024
