= 2024 Burnsville shooting =

Shootout in Minnesota, U.S.

- Location: Burnsville, Minnesota, U.S.
- Date: February 18, 2024; 2 years ago c. 5:30 a.m. (CST)
- Attack type: Mass shooting, murder-suicide, triple-murder, shootout
- Weapons: Multiple firearms, including two AR-15-style rifles obtained via straw purchase
- Deaths: 4 (including the perpetrator) • Officer Paul Elmstrand • Officer Matthew Ruge • Firefighter-Paramedic Adam Finseth
- Injuries: 2 (1 by gunfire)
- Perpetrator: Shannon Cortez Gooden
- Charges: Ashley Anne Dyrdahl: Conspiracy (1 count); Straw purchasing (5 counts); Making false statements (5 counts)

On February 18, 2024, during a police standoff in Burnsville, Minnesota, Shannon Gooden shot and killed police officers Paul Elmstrand and Matthew Ruge and firefighter-paramedic Adam Finseth, who had responded to a 911 call reporting an alleged sexual assault. After a shootout with first responders, Gooden killed himself with a single gunshot to the head.

Federal authorities later filed charges against Gooden's girlfriend, Ashley Anne Dyrdahl, for allegedly straw purchasing the guns for Gooden. She eventually pleaded guilty and was sentenced to over three years in prison.

== Background ==
=== Perpetrator ===
The perpetrator, identified as 38-year-old Shannon Gooden (December 30, 1985 – February 18, 2024), had a violent criminal history dating as early as December 2004. Gooden lost his firearm ownership rights after being convicted for felony assault after an August 2007 fight with family members at the Burnsville Center. He unsuccessfully attempted to restore his firearm rights in 2020. Gooden had previously been accused of intimate partner violence multiple times in court, and at least three women had sought orders of protection from him. One ex-girlfriend said Gooden had gotten other family members to assault her, and that he had previously fantasized about dying in a shootout with the police, in an attempt to keep her from contacting law enforcement. The woman and Gooden had three children together, who were among the seven children overall present in the house during the shootout.

=== Victims ===
The first responders killed in the shooting were Burnsville police officers Paul Elmstrand and Matthew Ruge, both 27, along with firefighter-paramedic Adam Finseth, 40. In addition, another police officer, Sgt. Adam Medlicott, 38, was shot twice and hospitalized. He was discharged the day following the shootout to recover at home. A child who lived at the home was cut by flying glass after Gooden shot through a window.

== Events ==
In Burnsville, Minnesota, a suburb of Minneapolis, a woman, presumably Dyrdahl, called 911 at 1:50 am to report an alleged sexual assault by her husband and to request a police presence at her house. The caller provided her address, but the call cut off shortly after. The 911 dispatcher called back several times to try and gain more information, but was unable to make contact.

Officers from the Burnsville Police Department were dispatched and arrived at the house just before 2:00 am. Gooden, Dyrdahl, and seven children between the ages of 2 and 15 were in the house. Officers entered the home and made contact with Gooden and Dyrdahl. Gooden told officers he was unarmed, but at some point barricaded himself in a bedroom. Officers attempted to negotiate with him for several hours and at 5:26 am Gooden opened fire without warning, shooting Medlicott, Elmstrand, and Ruge. Medlicott and officer Daniel Wical returned fire, shooting Gooden in the leg. In process of leaving the house and seeking cover behind an armored vehicle that was parked in the driveway, Medlicott and Ruge were both shot a second time. Finseth was subsequently killed by gunfire while attempting to aid the wounded officers. Gooden continued firing from inside the house at police, including shooting through a window. At some point Dyrdahl exited the house. The standoff ended after Gooden killed himself with a single gunshot to the head. A child in the house called 911 around 6:55 am to report the suicide and all children left the house safely shortly afterwards. Officers found Gooden's body and cleared the house at 10:15 am.

Investigators later found that Gooden had fired multiple guns and over 100 rifle rounds, which were capable of piercing tactical armor. A large amount of ammunition and several firearms were found in the house, including one equipped with a binary trigger.

== Reaction ==
=== Statements ===
The shooting was the subject of national media coverage in the United States.

Angie Craig, whose United States House of Representatives district includes Burnsville, said, "Today serves as another solemn reminder that those who protect our communities do so at great personal risk. We must do everything in our power to prevent tragedies like these before they happen and hold violent criminals accountable to the fullest extent of the law."

Minnesota Governor Tim Walz and United States Senator Amy Klobuchar expressed condolences to the families of the victims. Walz ordered flags in the state to be flown at half-mast.

Violence Free Minnesota, an anti-domestic-violence advocacy group, said it considered the victims of the shooting to be the 2nd, 3rd, and 4th known Minnesotan victims of intimate partner homicide in 2024, and that they represent the way domestic violence "touches and impacts communities and people beyond those just in the relationship".

=== Minnesota Legislature ===
Following the shooting, members of the Minnesota Legislature discussed implementing stricter gun storage, safety, and reporting requirements, as well as providing additional services for victims of domestic violence. Later, following the indictments against Dyrdahl, they also began to discuss tightening the penalties for making straw gun purchases, as well as banning binary triggers like the ones on the guns used in the shooting. A ban on binary triggers was passed as part of a 2024 tax bill, but the provision was struck down in August 2025 by a Ramsey County judge due to violation of the Minnesota Constitution.

=== Memorials ===
On February 24, a convoy of several hundred cars, fire engines, tow trucks and semitrucks traveled across Burnsville to commemorate the deceased first responders and to raise donations for their families. The convoy, which was organized primarily via Facebook, began and ended at the Burnsville Center, lasting several hours. A memorial processional was also announced for Wednesday, February 28, which resulted in changes to the local bus schedule for that day. Burnsville-Eagan-Savage School District also cancelled all classes on the day of the memorial.

== Legal proceedings ==
Dyrdahl, a former girlfriend of Gooden, was federally indicted on March 14, 2024, for allegedly straw purchasing five firearms on Gooden's behalf, two of which were used during the shooting. One of the firearms fired was acquired on January 5, 2024, at a local gun store by Dyrdahl. According to U.S. Attorney Andrew M. Luger, "The indictment makes it clear that Dyrdahl and Gooden knew exactly what they were doing. ... That he could not purchase firearms because he was a convicted felon. So instead, he would pick out specific weapons and she would buy them in violation of federal law—placing powerful weapons in the hands of a violent, convicted felon."

Dyrdahl was charged with one count of conspiracy, five counts of straw purchasing, and five counts of making false statements during the purchase of a firearm and faced up to 15 years in prison, if convicted. The guns she purchased were:

- Franklin Armory FAI-15 .300-caliber semi-automatic pistol
- Palmetto State Armory PA-15 semi-automatic rifle
- Palmetto State Armory Sabre-15 semi-automatic rifle
- Glock 47 9mm semi-automatic pistol
- Glock 43X 9mm semi-automatic pistol

She initially pleaded not guilty to the charges at a hearing on March 14, 2024, but changed her plea to guilty on January 14, 2025. On September 10, 2025, she was sentenced to 3 years and 9 months in prison, followed by 2 years of supervised release.

A GoFundMe was established for Dyrdahl and her children, which raised over $20,000. Following her incarceration, the fundraiser is only for her children.

== See also ==
- 2023 Fargo, North Dakota shooting
- 2024 Minneapolis shooting
- Gun politics in the United States
- List of mass shootings in the United States in 2024
