= Maplewood Historic District =

Historic district in New York, United States

- U.S. National Register of Historic Places
- U.S. Historic district
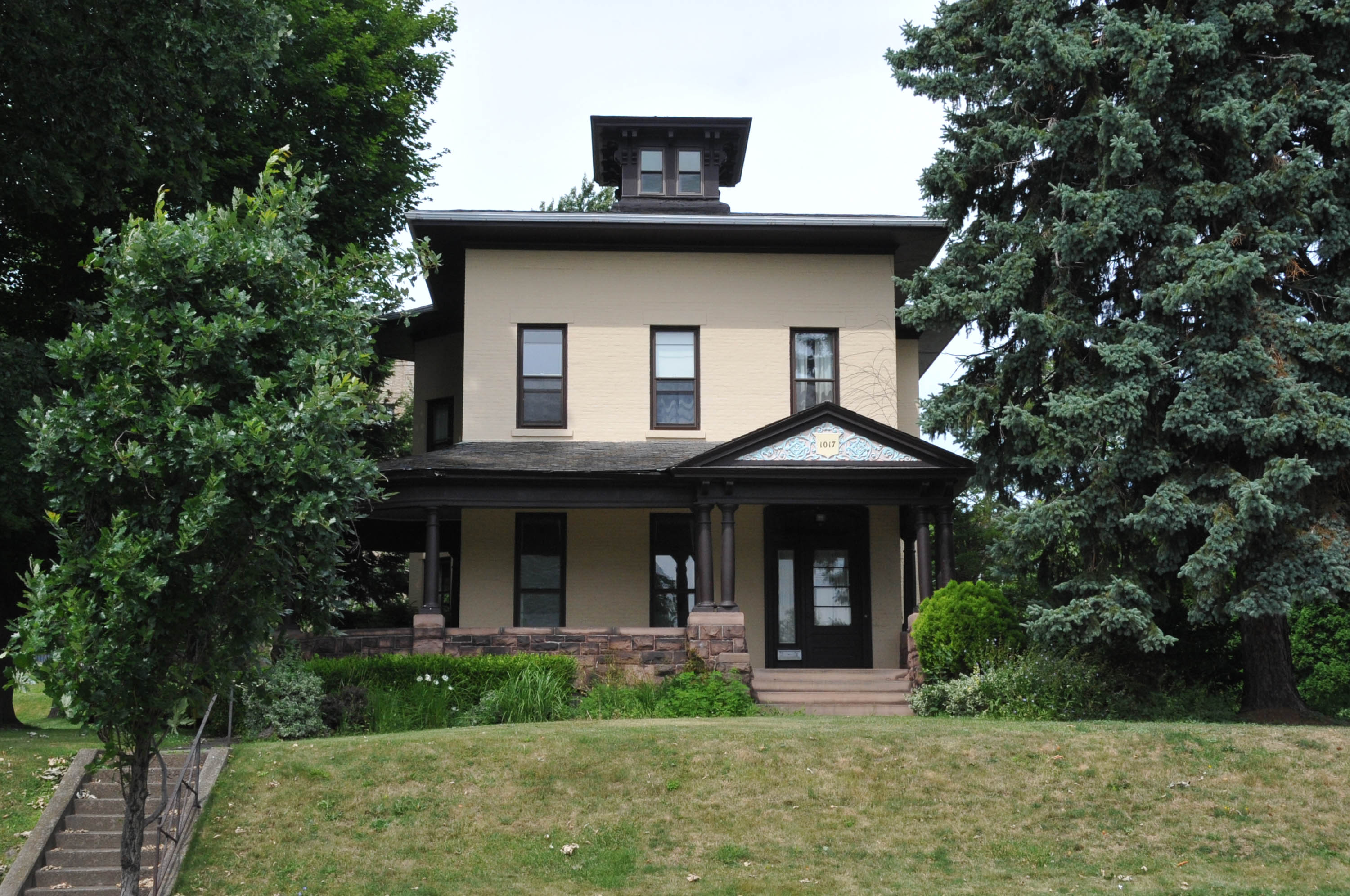
- 1017 Lake Avenue in the Maplewood Historic District, January 2008

- Location within New York Location within the United States
- Location: 21-267 Alameda, 26-284 Albemarle, 21-148 Augustine, 36-68 Birr Sts., 1-9 Burke Terrace, 1136-1212 Dewey Ave., Rochester, New York
- Coordinates: 43°11′20″N 77°37′49″W
- Area: 178 acres (72 ha)
- Architect: multiple
- Architectural style: Italianate, Second Empire, Queen Anne
- NRHP reference No.: 97001454 (original); 16000779 (increase)

Significant dates
- Added to NRHP: December 08, 1997
- Boundary increase: November 15, 2016

The Maplewood Historic District is located in Rochester in Monroe County, New York. The district is distinguished as having landscape designs, including Maplewood Park, originally laid out by Frederick Law Olmsted.

The district consists of 432 contributing structures and four contributing sites. They include 245 contributing primary buildings (234 houses, two apartments, three churches, two church-related residences, three buildings associated with a church school, and one recreational facility). There are also 187 contributing outbuildings (carriagehouses and garages). The four contributing sites are three parks and one archaeological site.

It was listed on the National Register of Historic Places in 1997. In 2016 its boundaries were increased to take in more properties.

== See also ==
- National Register of Historic Places listings in Rochester, New York
