= Lilly Grove, West Virginia =

- Unincorporated community
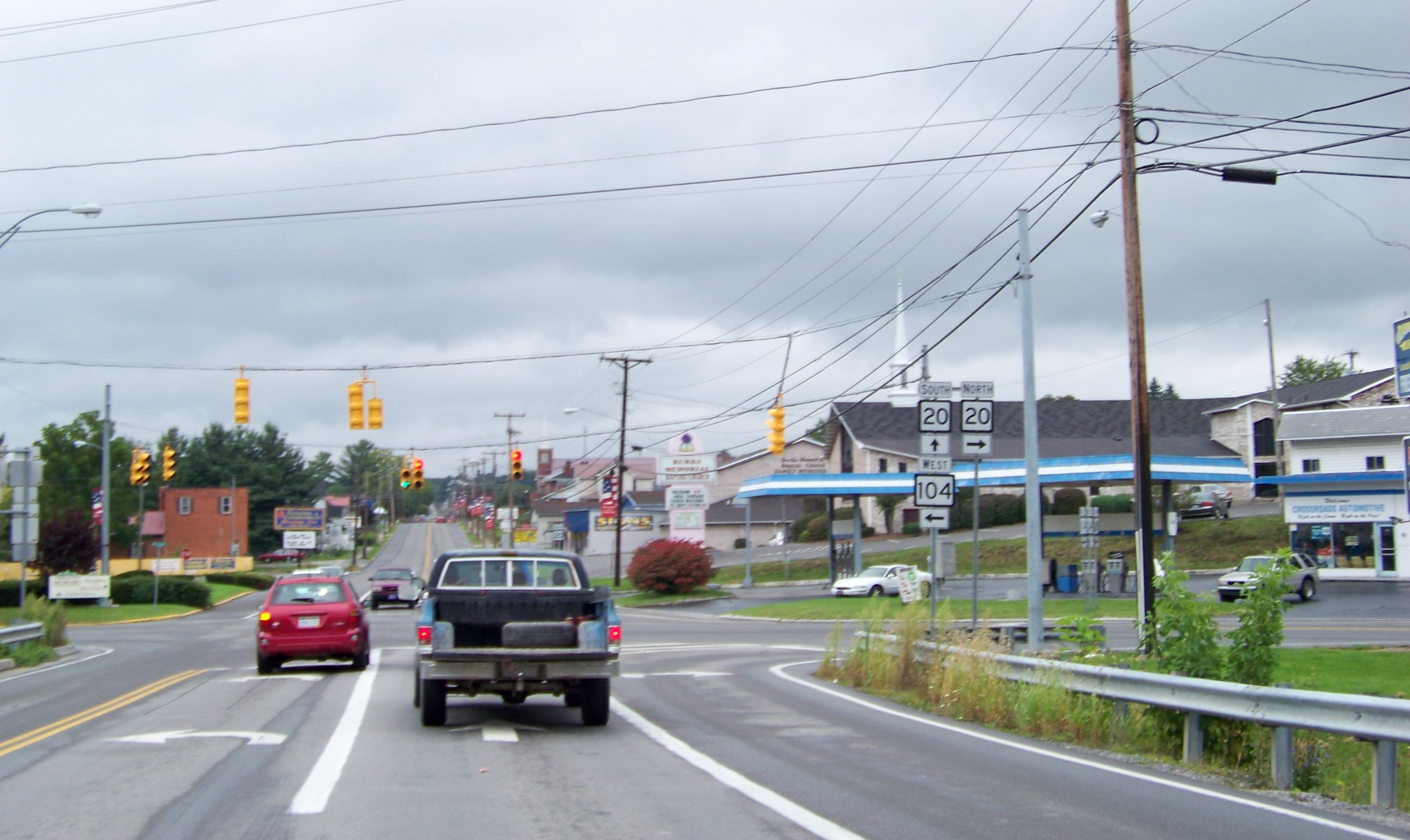
- Entering Princeton from Lilly Grove

- Location within the state of West Virginia Lilly Grove, West Virginia (the United States)
- Coordinates: 37°22′18″N 81°04′14″W
- Country: United States
- State: West Virginia
- County: Mercer
- Elevation: 2,434 ft (742 m)
- Time zone: UTC-5 (Eastern (EST))
  - Summer (DST): UTC-4 (EDT)
- Area codes: 304 & 681
- GNIS feature ID: 1554953

Lilly Grove is an unincorporated community in Mercer County, West Virginia, United States. Lilly Grove is located along West Virginia Route 20, 2 miles (3.2 km) east of Princeton.
