= Southland Park, Louisville =

Neighborhood in Louisville, Kentucky

Coordinates: 38°09′44″N 85°45′32″W

Southland Park is a neighborhood in Louisville, Kentucky, United States. Its boundaries are Southside Drive to the west, the Greater Louisville Technology Park (formerly Naval Ordnance) to the north, the CSX railroad tracks to the east, and the pre-merger Louisville city limits to the south.
