= Baton Rouge shooting =

Baton Rouge shooting may refer to:

- Killing of Yoshihiro Hattori, the fatal shooting of a Japanese exchange student on October 17, 1992
- Killing of Alton Sterling, the fatal shooting of an African American man by police on July 5, 2016
- 2016 shooting of Baton Rouge police officers, in which three officers were killed and three others injured on July 17, 2016
