= 2016 shooting of Dallas police officers =

Mass shooting in Texas, U.S.

- Screenshot from a video showing Micah Johnson in front of El Centro College, on the Lamar Street side
- Location: 32°46′48″N 96°48′16″W; Main Street and S. Lamar Street, Dallas, Texas, U.S
- Date: July 7–8, 2016; 10 years ago 8:58 p.m. – 2:30 a.m. (CT)
- Target: White police officers in Dallas
- Attack type: Mass shooting, mass murder, shootout, ambush, domestic terrorism
- Weapons: Saiga AK-74 5.45×39mm semi-automatic rifle; Glock 19 Gen4 semi-automatic pistol; Fraser .25 ACP semi-automatic pistol (unused)
- Deaths: 6 (including the perpetrator)
- Injuries: 11 (9 officers, 2 civilians)
- Perpetrator: Micah Johnson
- Motive: Anti-police sentiment, anti-white racism

On July 7, 2016, Micah Xavier Johnson ambushed and shot police officers in Dallas, Texas, killing five, injuring nine others, and wounding two civilians. Johnson, a 25-year-old Army Reserve Afghan War veteran, was angry over police shootings of black men. He shot the officers at the end of a protest against the recent killings by police of Alton Sterling in Baton Rouge, Louisiana, and Philando Castile in Falcon Heights, Minnesota.

Johnson fled to a building on the campus of El Centro College, where acting police Sergeant Thomas Sible and other officers cornered him. After a standoff lasting several hours, police killed Johnson using a remote-controlled robot armed with an explosive device. This marked the first time in history U.S. law enforcement used a robot to kill a suspect.

The shooting was the deadliest incident for U.S. law enforcement since the September 11 attacks, surpassing two related March 2009 shootings in Oakland, California, and a November 2009 ambush shooting in Lakewood, Washington, each of which killed four police officers and the gunmen. It was the second-deadliest targeted attack of U.S. law enforcement officers in history; and the largest since the Young Brothers massacre of 1932 killed six officers in Missouri.

== Background ==
=== 2015 attack ===
Approximately one year before the shooting, a different attack was perpetrated against the Dallas Police Department (DPD) which The New York Times likened to the 2016 shooting, comparing their outcomes and the armament of the perpetrators. Several officers were involved in both incidents.

On June 13, 2015, at approximately 12:30 a.m., 35-year-old James Lance Boulware (October 26, 1979 – June 13, 2015) parked an armored van in front of DPD headquarters, which is located in the Cedars neighborhood. There, he opened fire using what appeared to be a semi-automatic rifle. When police officers responded, Boulware rammed a Dallas Police patrol car and began shooting at officers from inside the van, striking the squad cars. He then fled in the van to nearby Hutchins, Texas (10 miles (16 km) south of Dallas), where he stopped in the parking lot of a Jack in the Box franchise. He remained in the van as a standoff with police ensued. Further gunfire was exchanged with the police while a perimeter was set up around the van, and a SWAT team was called in.

The driver identified himself to police as James Boulware, and claimed that the police had taken his son, accusing him of "being a terrorist". He then cut off communication with officers after making increasingly agitated and angry rants against police. The driver then threatened to blow the police up. The standoff continued as SWAT officers used a .50-caliber rifle to disable the engine block of the armored van. The standoff ended when a sniper fired additional rounds into the vehicle, killing the driver.

Police subsequently sent in robots that used water charges in an attempt to make entry into the vehicle, which succeeded in breaching the windshield. Police were then able to verify that the suspect was the only person in the vehicle, and that he was deceased. Police robots also used water charges to disable two sets of pipe bombs found in the van. Due to concerns that the van, which was identified as a purpose-built "Zombie Apocalypse Assault Vehicle and Troop Transport" with gun ports and armor-plated windows, was booby-trapped with explosives, police then destroyed the van in a controlled explosion. No police officers or civilians were injured in the incident. Four suspicious bags were found at the police headquarters, one of which contained pipe bombs. Another bag exploded while being moved by a police bomb disposal robot, and a third bag found under a police vehicle was detonated by an explosive ordnance disposal team. At 6:19 a.m., the headquarters building was confirmed clear of all explosives.

Dallas officers initially stated that up to four suspects were involved in the attack on their headquarters, but later said they believed only one person was involved and the reports of multiple suspects had resulted from him changing positions during the attack. The only clearly identified suspect communicating with police gave his name as James Boulware. News reports confirmed that Boulware was arrested in Paris, Texas, in 2013 after a report of family violence, and several firearms he owned were also confiscated. Boulware's family members then reported to authorities that they were concerned that he might go on a shooting spree after he threatened to kill all the adult members of his family and to shoot up some churches and schools. Boulware later made threats against a judge in his child custody case after he and the mother of his eleven-year-old son lost custody of their son to Boulware's mother, on the grounds that they were unfit for sole custody of the child.

=== July 2016 protests ===
On July 7, 2016, a protest took place in Dallas in response to the killings of two men, Alton Sterling and Philando Castile, by police officers in Louisiana and Minnesota, respectively, days before. The Dallas protest was one of several held across the United States on the night of July 7. Around 800 protesters were involved, and around 100 police officers were assigned to monitor the event. About 20 to 30 open-carry gun rights activists joined the protest march, some wearing gas masks, bulletproof vests, and fatigues, according to Dallas Police Chief David Brown.

== Shootings ==
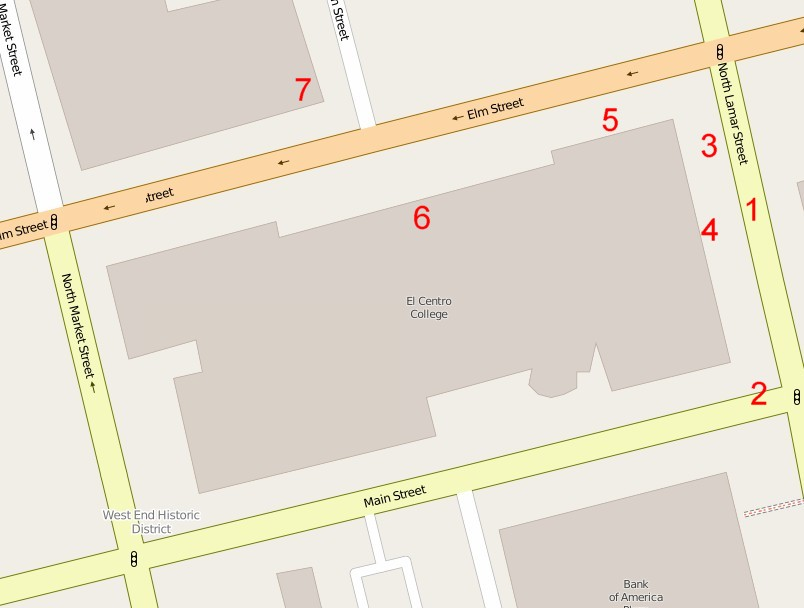
Map of events.: 1. Johnson parks SUV and fires towards Main Street; 2. Senior Corporal Lorne Ahrens, Officer Patrick Zamarippa, and Officer Michael Krol are killed. Several other officers and a civilian were injured.; 3. Johnson chases down and kills DART Police Officer Brent Thompson.; 4. Johnson attempts but fails to enter the college.; 5. Johnson enters the college from Elm Street (location unknown); 6. Johnson goes to second floor, runs into a dead end, and shoots towards a 7-Eleven.; 7. 7-Eleven where Sergeant Michael Smith is shot and killed.

Most of the events happened in the streets and buildings around El Centro College, which forms a city block composed of multiple buildings. The block is bordered by Main Street on the south where the protest march was taking place; Lamar Street (now Botham Jean Blvd.) to the east from where Johnson initiated the shooting spree; and Elm Street to the north where Johnson eventually entered the college.

=== Main Street shootings ===
Around 8:58 p.m. Johnson parked his SUV sideways on Lamar Street, in front of the east entrance to the college, at Building A, and left the vehicle hazard lights blinking. At the time, the street had been cleared out in anticipation of the protest. Taking cover at street level, he began shooting at groups of police and protesters who were gathered on Main Street. Johnson was believed to have talked to three of the officers he shot before he first opened fire.

Three officers were killed in the initial gunfire, while at least three others and a civilian were injured. Eleven officers fired back. During the shooting, officers, unaware where the shots were coming from, scrambled to block intersections and were exposed to gunfire as a result.

Immediately afterwards, Johnson made his way north on Lamar Street, encountering Officer Brent Thompson along the way. A civilian recorded video of the encounter from his hotel balcony on Lamar Street. The video showed Johnson, clad in tactical clothing and armed with a rifle, loading his rifle and firing indiscriminately to draw officers near his position. When Thompson approached a corner, Johnson engaged him in a gunfight, forcing Thompson to take cover behind a concrete pillar. Johnson fired towards one side of the pillar, then ran over to the other side of the pillar to flank Thompson and shot him multiple times from behind, killing him.

=== El Centro College shootout ===
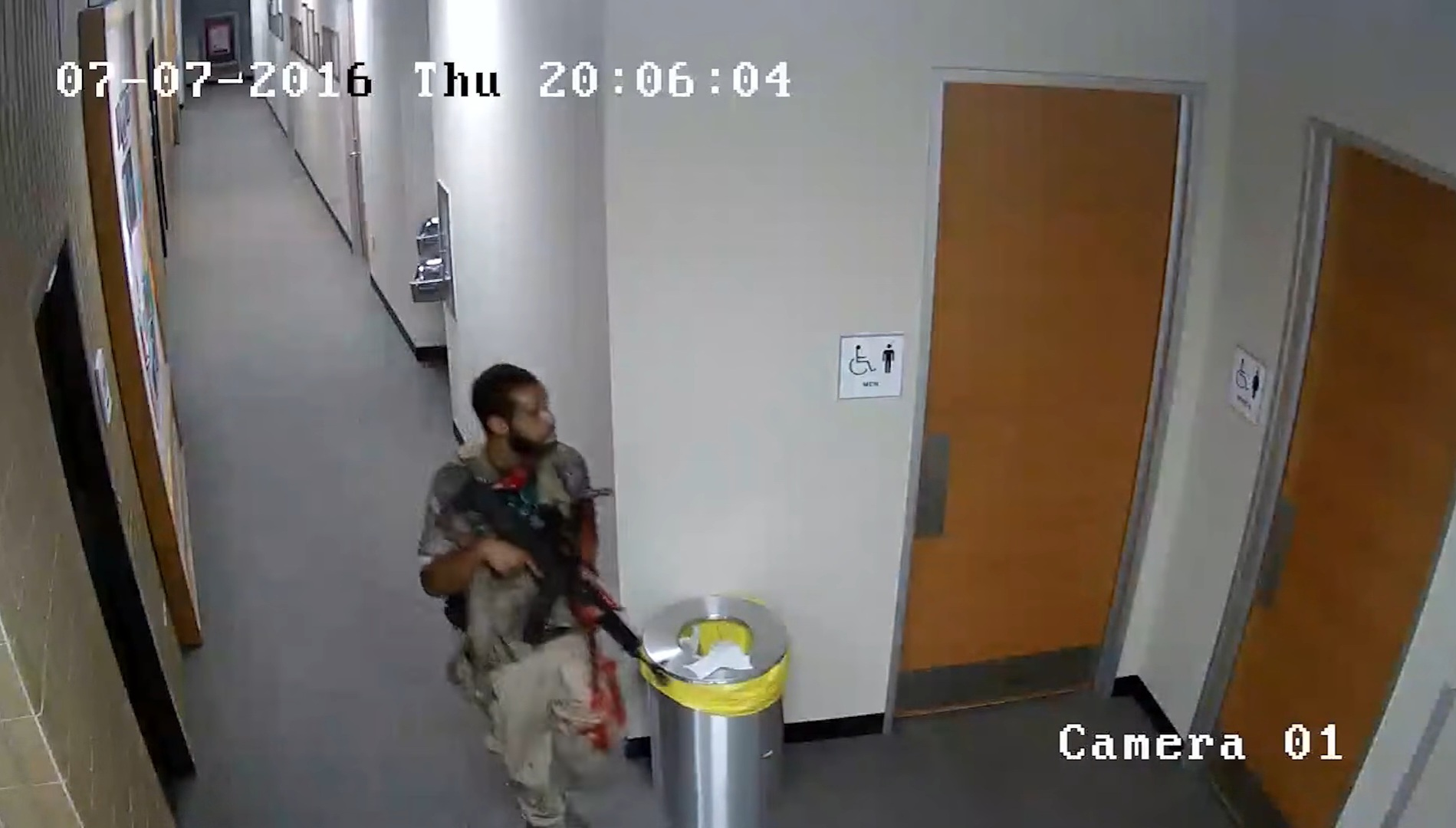
A screenshot of CCTV footage in El Centro college of Micah roaming around.

Johnson, injured during the firefight, attempted to enter the Lamar Street entrance of the college by shooting out the glass door but was unable to make his way in. He wounded two campus police officers who were near the doorway inside the building. Corporal Bryan Shaw was shot in the stomach underneath his bulletproof vest, while Officer John Abbott was hit by flying glass in the legs. Johnson then made his way to Elm Street where he shot out another glass door and entered the college unseen; he then made his way to Building B. Hearing the shattering glass, one of the injured campus officers, Corporal Shaw, made his way through the building and discovered a trail of blood leading to a stairwell. Accompanied by another police officer, Shaw entered the stairwell and was met with a hail of gunfire coming from above. Unable to see Johnson, he held his fire and retreated with the other officer.

Afterwards, Johnson made his way along a mezzanine between the school's second-floor dining area and third-floor library, but came onto a dead end of windows facing down onto Elm Street. He shot out multiple windows and fired repeatedly at officers on Elm Street. He hit Michael Smith, a police officer standing in front of a 7-Eleven, killing him and shattering the store-front glass. Officers began entering the college, sealing escape routes from the building, and evacuating students and teachers in the building, including those on a floor above Johnson, through a different stairwell.

Approaching Johnson on the second floor near the library, Dallas SWAT officers led by SWAT Sergeant Thomas Sible found him secured behind a corner firing intermittently. He was in an area filled with offices and the school's computer servers, with only two doors leading to where he was positioned, and a hallway about 30 feet (9.1 m) long separating him from SWAT members. At least 200 gunshots were believed to have been fired by Johnson and SWAT officers in that area during the standoff.

=== Standoff and shooter's death ===
Body camera video released in July 2021 pursuant to an open records request shows Senior Corporal Larry Gordon, a SWAT negotiator at the time, and other officers attempting for several hours to negotiate with Johnson. Officers interviewed by WFAA later said that they had sought to negotiate with Johnson because he was too heavily armed for the officers to risk charging him, but that they were under pressure and could not wait indefinitely because Johnson could pop out from behind a corner at any time to shoot an officer. The body camera footage shows Senior Corporal Matt Banes expressing concern that the bullets Johnson fired on the second floor were easily penetrating the drywall, making it impossible for the negotiators to find safe cover, and posing a risk to any students who might have remained in the building.

Johnson shouted "Black supremacy! Black liberation!" and began firing on police officers when they initially cornered him in the hallway. As the officers began asking Johnson questions, Johnson said he would speak to black police officers only and repeatedly referred to himself as "X". When the negotiator, Sr. Corporal Gordon, told Johnson that he was black, Johnson initially responded, "No way." Johnson told Sr. Corporal Gordon that he served overseas in the military. At one point, as negotiations deteriorated, Johnson told Sr. Corporal Gordon, "The talking is over. It's time for a revolution, brother. If you are my brother, turn your weapon on those behind you."

Johnson said that he had acted alone and was not part of any group. According to Chief Brown, Johnson appeared delusional during his standoff; "We had negotiated with him for about two hours, and he just basically lied to us, playing games, laughing at us, singing, asking how many did he get and that he wanted to kill some more." However, Sr. Corporal Gordon indicated in an interview that the shooter "wasn't delusional" and that "he was very lucid, seemed to be very sane and very in control".

Johnson repeatedly taunted police by goading them into the hallway and claiming to have planted bombs throughout the city. Later searches of Downtown Dallas found no evidence of explosives. After several hours of negotiations, police determined that Johnson could not be persuaded to surrender and that they could not "wait him out" any longer because he might charge officers in the narrow hallway at any moment, as he had done several times earlier. So, the team began considering several tactical plans to end the standoff.

Sr. Cpl. Banes said they considered using a .50 caliber rifle to fire at the shooter, which had been successful in the 2015 attack approximately one year earlier. However, in that case, the suspect had driven an armored truck into police headquarters and remained inside the vehicle. Johnson was holed up inside a populated college with thin drywall walls, so the tactical team deemed that approach too dangerous. They also considered rappelling down the building or attacking Johnson through the ceiling after opening it with explosives. Both options were ruled out due to the risks they might pose to the officers who would carry it out.

Ultimately the SWAT team arrived at the idea to use a bomb disposal remote control vehicle armed with about 1 pound (0.45 kilograms) of C-4 explosive. The plan was to move the robot to a point against a wall facing Johnson and then detonate the explosives. The device exploded as intended at approximately 2:30 a.m. the next morning, killing Johnson immediately. It was the first time that explosives strapped to a robot had been used in American domestic law enforcement. Although its arm sustained damage in the blast, the robot was still functional.

In the aftermath, police investigated Johnson's body and equipment. He was found lying next to a rifle, two handguns, additional rifle magazines, and a bag filled with supplies. Police had initially located Johnson within the college by following a trail of blood he had left behind as he climbed to the second floor, bleeding from a wound he had sustained on Lamar Street. After the standoff, investigators discovered that Johnson had scrawled the letters "RB" and other messages in his own blood while making his way up a stairwell. Police investigated the markings made by Johnson, but did not conclusively determine if they had any special meaning.

Asked about the remarks Johnson made during the negotiation, Sr. Corporal Gordon later reflected, "I think he was angry ... and he felt powerless, I think. And that's why I think he took the rifle and took it upon himself to attack us. Because he felt powerless, and he wanted to die to show ... because he says he's doing this for his people ... And I think the hook that I had with him was that I was an African-American male."

== Victims ==
Five officers were killed; nine other officers and two civilians were injured.

Most of the victims were shot during the protests, and at least one other during a shootout. The dead comprised four DPD officers and one Dallas Area Rapid Transit (DART) officer. Four of the injured officers were from DPD, three were from DART, and two were from El Centro College. Seven of the injured officers were treated at Parkland Memorial Hospital. Two officers underwent surgery. One civilian was shot in the back of the leg, breaking her tibia.

The officers killed were identified as:

- DPD Senior Cpl. Lorne Ahrens, 48, who had been with the department since 2002 and formerly served with Los Angeles County Sheriff's Department from 1991 to 2002.
- DPD Officer Michael Krol, 40, who had been with the department since 2003.
- DPD Sgt. Michael Smith, 55, a former Army Ranger who had been with the department since 1989.
- DART Officer Brent Thompson, 43, a former enlisted Marine who had been with the department since 2007. Thompson was the first DART officer to be killed in the line of duty since the department's inception in 1989.
- DPD Officer Patricio "Patrick" Zamarripa, 32, a former Navy sailor and Iraq War veteran who had been with the department since 2010.

This was the deadliest single incident for law enforcement officers in the United States since the September 11 attacks, surpassing two 2009 shootings in Lakewood, Washington, and Oakland, California, which each left four officers dead.

== Perpetrator ==
Police identified the gunman as Micah Xavier Johnson and said they had found no direct ties between him and Black Lives Matter protesters, instead believing that he had been planning an attack for some time and acted on his own. He had no criminal record in Texas.

Johnson participated in John Horn High School's Junior Reserve Officers' Training Corps program, according to the Mesquite Independent School District. Johnson enlisted in the U.S. Army Reserve and served from March 2009 to April 2015; from November 2013 to July 2014, he was deployed to Afghanistan. Documents released by the Army on July 29, 2016, detailed early signs of disturbing behavior being exhibited by him, but specific details were redacted.

On May 1, 2014, during his deployment, Johnson was accused of sexual harassment by a female soldier, who sought a protective order against him and said that he needed mental health counseling. The accusation was made after the soldier reported four pairs of women's underwear missing from her laundry bag; they were later recovered from Johnson's quarters and person during an inspection. Upon being confronted about it, Johnson fled with the undergarments and attempted to dispose of them in a nearby dumpster. He then lied that a female civilian acquaintance gave the underwear to him, but the female soldier confirmed that they were in fact hers.

Following the inspection, he was disarmed and moved to Bagram Airfield on May 3, but he did not have enough time to pack all of his belongings. While soldiers were emptying Johnson's quarters and packing his belongings for him on May 14, they discovered an unauthorized single M430I High Explosive Dual Purpose 40mm grenade, a .50-caliber round, and another soldier's prescription medication in his sleeping bag. Later, the Army sent Johnson back to the U.S. and initiated proceedings to give Johnson an "other than honorable" discharge. On the advice of his attorney, Johnson waived his right to a hearing in exchange for a more favorable general discharge under honorable conditions. He was honorably discharged in September 2014, apparently as a result of an Army error.

Chief Brown said that Johnson, who was black, was furious about recent police shootings of black men and "stated he wanted to kill white people, especially officers". Friends and former coworkers described Johnson as "always [being] distrustful of the police" and being affected by recent police shootings of black men. Investigations into his online activities uncovered his interest in Black nationalist groups and Marxist Leninist groups associated with "Revolutionary Black Nationalism", a left-wing counterpart of right-wing "black nationalism". Among other activities, Johnson "liked" the Facebook page of the African American Defense League, whose leader, Mauricelm-Lei Millere, called for the murders of police officers across the U.S. following the 2014 murder of Laquan McDonald. In response to the police killing of Alton Sterling, the organization had "posted a message earlier in the week encouraging violence against police".

Conversely, people familiar with Johnson during his military service believed he may have been severely stressed with serving in a combat zone. They also said he had little interest in the topics of racial injustice and the killing of Trayvon Martin that occurred at the time. In an interview, Johnson's parents said that he was once extroverted and patriotic and wanted to become a police officer. Following his discharge from the Army, they described him as disillusioned, reclusive, and resentful of the U.S. government; and believed he had been disappointed by his experience in the military.

The Veterans Health Administration released documents in August 2016 showing that Johnson had symptoms for post-traumatic stress disorder (PTSD) following his return from Afghanistan. He was not formally diagnosed with the condition, and doctors concluded that he presented no serious risk to himself or others. Johnson had sought treatment for anxiety, depression, and hallucinations and was prescribed several medications, including a muscle relaxant, an antidepressant, and anti-anxiety and sleep medication.

== Investigation ==
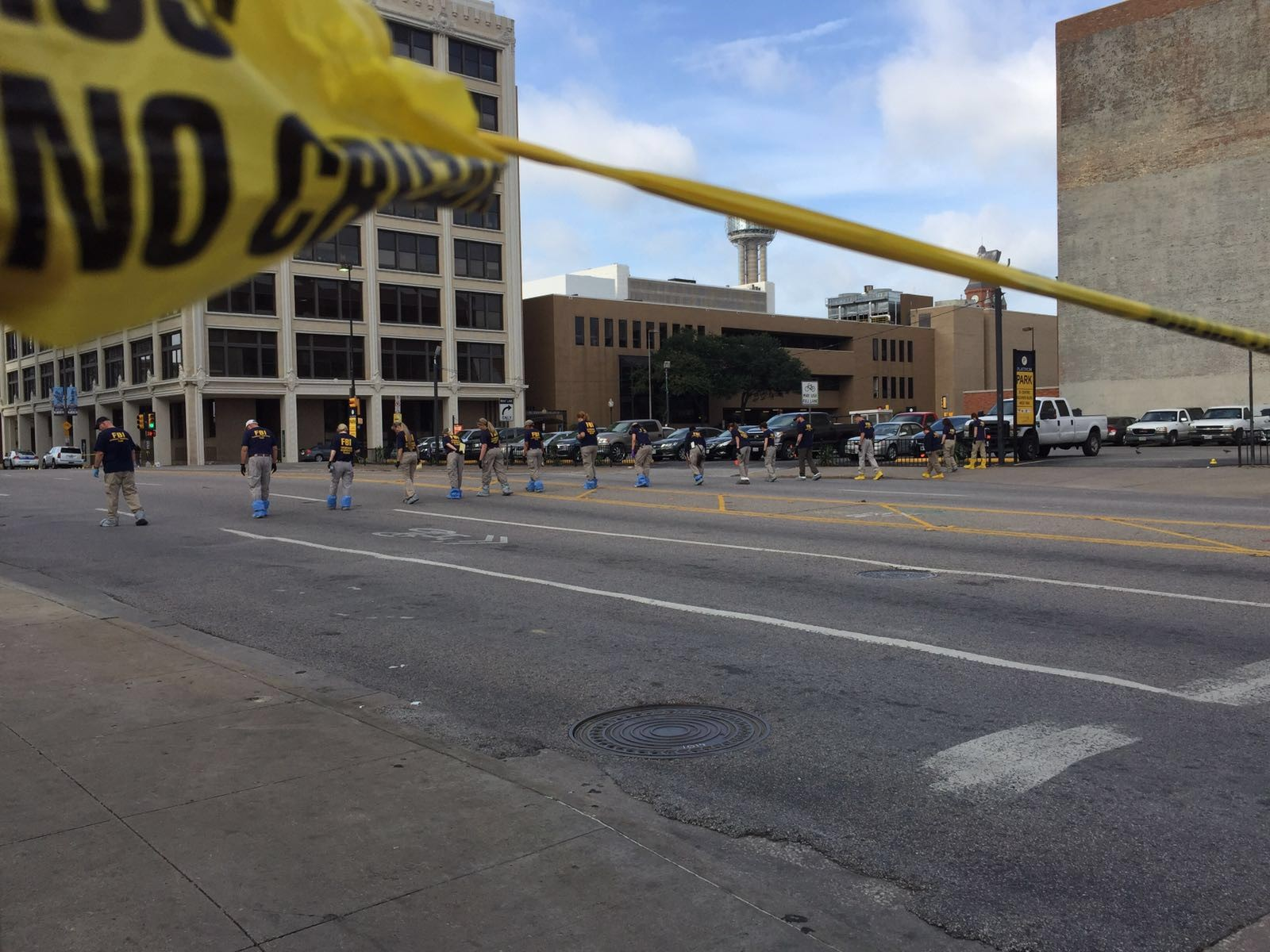
Law enforcement personnel investigating the crime scene

=== Weapons ===
There were conflicting reports on the type of semi-automatic rifle that Johnson used during the shooting. Clay Jenkins, the Dallas County chief executive and the director of homeland security and emergency management, said Johnson used an SKS. News reports, all citing unnamed officials familiar with the investigation, said Johnson used an Izhmash-Saiga 5.45mm rifle, which is a variation on the AK-74.

The New York Daily News interviewed a man who sold Johnson a semiautomatic AK-74 pattern rifle in November 2014. The man said he sold Johnson the rifle and made the deal in a Target parking lot. When the man asked the ATF if his weapon played a part in the shooting, the ATF agent who responded said, "All we can say is it was recovered. We're just finding out everything we can."

In addition to the rifle, Johnson carried at least one handgun with a high-capacity magazine during the attack. CNN, citing an unnamed official, reported that two handguns were recovered, one a Glock 19 Gen4 pistol and the other a Fraser .25-caliber.

The FBI reported that Johnson wore ballistic body armor with hard armor plates during the shooting.

=== Searches ===
Johnson's family home was searched by authorities the day after the shooting. Bomb-making materials, ballistic vests, two rifles, ammunition, and a "personal journal of combat tactics" containing "instruction on shooting techniques and tactical movements" were recovered from the home by detectives. Chief Brown reported that the journal included "quite a bit of rambling ... that's hard to decipher."

Chief Brown said that recovered evidence pointed to Johnson practicing detonations and having enough explosive material to cause "devastating effects" throughout Dallas and the North Texas area. However, the latter claim was contradicted on July 18 by two officials familiar with the investigation, who both said small amounts of Tannerite, a binary explosive used to make explosive targets for gun ranges, and acetone, an accelerant in explosives, were recovered from the home.

Investigators interviewed 300 witnesses and officers after the shooting. Investigators examined Johnson's laptop, journal, and cell phone, along with 170 hours of body camera footage. However, there were concerns about the resolution quality of some of the 90 cameras installed in downtown Dallas, which could have recorded parts of the shooting essential to the investigation. The cameras were part of a multimillion-dollar downtown surveillance system implemented to reduce crime in the area. The DPD planned to release surveillance footage of the shooting on August 29, but held off, saying the release would interfere with its investigation.

=== Related arrests ===
Officials initially said two or more snipers carried out the shooting, with the confusion later attributed to ricocheting bullets and the echoes of gunshots. They later said that Johnson appears to have been the lone gunman, with all of the gunshots traced back to him. Three other people were taken into custody by police, "but officials have not said what roles they may have played". These three included two people seen carrying camouflage bags and leaving the shooting scene on Lamar Street. They were both stopped and detained after a six-mile chase. The detained persons were all later determined to be fleeing protesters who were either armed or carrying ammunition gear. However, police announced on July 9 that they were continuing to investigate whether Johnson acted alone or conspired with others in planning the shooting. Investigators obtained a search warrant to look for phone numbers connected to Johnson.

One of the people taken into custody by police had attended the protest wearing a camouflage T-shirt and openly carrying an unloaded AR-15 rifle. Shortly after the shooting, the DPD tweeted a photo of the man describing him as one of their suspects and asked the public's help in finding him. The police-released image of the suspect was widely shared on social media and broadcast on national television. The suspect turned himself in and was subsequently released after questioning without charge.

=== Criticism by Dallas Police Association ===
The then-president of the Dallas Police Association, Mike Mata, stated that due to the criticism of militarization of police, someone within the DPD's chain of command ordered the officers assigned to the protest to not wear military-style bulletproof vests because they did not want the officers to look too "militaristic, aggressive" and instead to wear standard issue kevlar vests, which were not able to protect against the rifle rounds Johnson fired. For the same reasons, officers were not able to arm themselves with long guns, such as AR-15s. Mata was interviewed by the local news station KDFW and said, "[A] lot of those shots, and a lot of those wounds... were chest shots, lower abdomen wound shots, and those heavy vests would have covered them".

=== Army internal review ===
On July 13, Pentagon officials announced that the U.S. Army had launched an internal review into Johnson's military service. The review was initiated after questions were raised about the appropriateness of his honorable discharge despite the sexual harassment allegations made against him, and the fact that the Army had been highly considering an "other than honorable discharge" for Johnson.

During the investigation, the Army uncovered an incomplete amount of information regarding the sexual harassment allegations. The following day, another review was initiated by the Army's Criminal Investigation Command, to determine if a full investigation was made into the allegations. An Army official echoed a statement made by the lawyer who represented Johnson, saying that Johnson's honorable discharge may have been the result of an administrative error. The same official added that nothing had been found in Johnson's record that indicated a willingness to commit murder.

On July 29, the Army released a heavily redacted report, which detailed the incident behind Johnson's discharge but did not address why he was discharged honorably. Another investigative report was released on August 17. On September 7, the Army released Johnson's personnel files.

== Aftermath ==
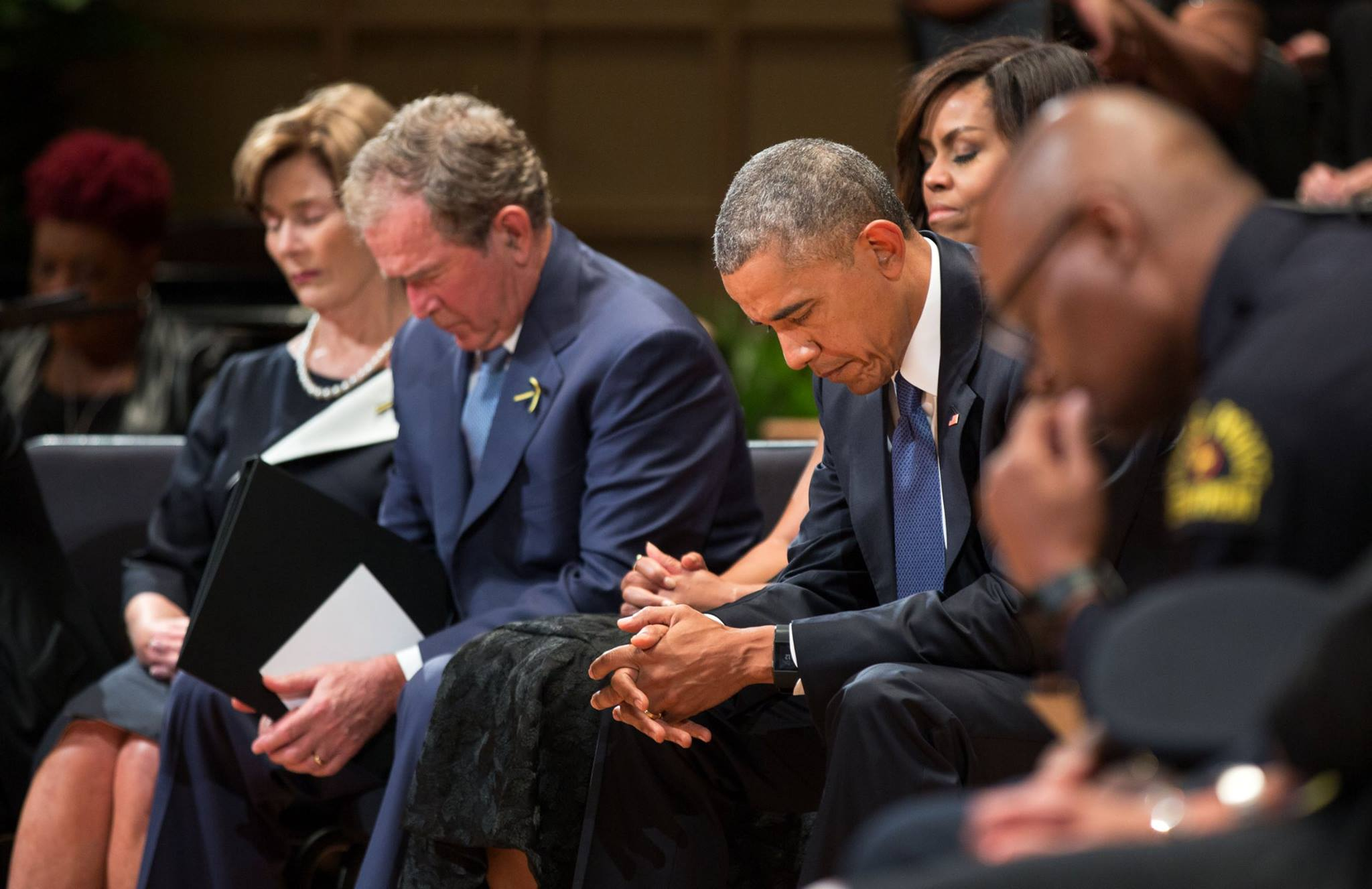
Former first lady Laura Bush, former President George W Bush, President Barack Obama and First Lady Michelle Obama at a memorial service for one of the officers killed in the shooting

DART suspended service in downtown Dallas after the shooting, but resumed the next morning with the exception of West End station. The Federal Aviation Administration issued a temporary flight restriction of civilian aircraft for the immediate vicinity in which the shooting occurred, allowing only police aircraft in the airspace.

El Centro College canceled all classes on July 8. Police barricaded the perimeter and began canvassing the crime scene. The explosion that killed Johnson also destroyed the school's servers, further delaying reopening. The school partially reopened on July 20, with staff returning that day and students on the following day. Buildings A, B, and C remained closed pending the FBI investigation. A "Reflect and Renew" ceremony dedicated to demonstrating citywide efforts to unify Dallas was held at the college on July 27. Students and staff, along with city and community officials, were in attendance.

Chief Brown said that police efforts to identify the gunman were made more difficult by the presence of up to thirty civilians openly carrying rifles during the protest, which is legal in Texas. Brown said, "We're trying as best we can as a law enforcement community to make it work so that citizens can express their Second Amendment rights. But it's increasingly challenging when people have AR-15s slung over their shoulder and they're in a crowd. We don't know who the good guy is versus the bad guy when everyone starts shooting." In an interview after the shooting, Dallas Mayor Mike Rawlings said that he supported changing state law to restrict the public carrying of rifles and shotguns so that the police could distinguish between suspects and civilians more easily during crises.

The Dallas Observer noted several similarities between Johnson and Mark Essex, a discharged U.S. Navy sailor and Black Panther who committed two attacks against White civilians and police officers on December 31, 1972, and January 7, 1973, in New Orleans. The attacks left nine people dead, including five police officers.

Information regarding the shootout and standoff, such as ballistics reports, autopsies for the victims and gunman, and full transcripts of the negotiation audio, remain sealed.

=== Lawsuits ===
In November 2016, Enrique Zamarripa, the father of Officer Patrick Zamarripa, one of the murdered police officers, filed a lawsuit against Black Lives Matter and 13 other defendants, including the Nation of Islam, the New Black Panther Party, the Reverend Al Sharpton, and individual activists. The lawsuit seeks $550 million in damages and claims that Johnson was acting as an agent for the defendants and alleged that the defendants incited violence and caused the Dallas shooting as a "direct result". The mother of the officer, Valerie Zamarripa, distanced herself from her ex-husband's lawsuit, saying that it did not reflect her views, or the views of the foundation set up in her son's name.

Earlier, in September 2016, a Dallas police officer, Sgt. Demetrick Pennie, represented by lawyer Larry Klayman, filed a lawsuit in the U.S. District Court for the Northern District of Texas against 17 people—including Louis Farrakhan, the Nation of Islam, Sharpton, the National Action Network, Black Lives Matter, DeRay Mckesson, Malik Zulu Shabazz, the New Black Panther Party, George Soros, President Barack Obama, Eric Holder, Hillary Clinton, and Jesse Jackson—blaming them for the attack and seeking damages of over $500 million. Klayman has used his nonprofit group Freedom Watch to pursue lawsuits that "further supposed 'far-right' causes" in the past. The lawsuit was seen as "unlikely to be taken too seriously by a judge" and all of Klayman's claims against Mckesson and Black Lives Matter were dismissed or withdrawn. Attorneys for Mckesson have argued that "Klayman should have known his claims were frivolous."

In January 2017, Pennie separately sued Twitter, Facebook, and Google in the U.S. District Court for the Northern District of California, claiming that the websites "knowingly and recklessly" allowed terrorist propaganda to be spread on their social networks.

=== Effects on policing ===
As a result of the shooting, local law enforcement officers worked more than $800,000 in overtime to help the DPD. This included $86,000 spent by the Dallas County Sheriff's Office, $88,000 spent by the Arlington Police Department, about $705,250 by DPD, and unknown sums by the Irving Police Department and the Dallas Fire-Rescue Department.

Following this shooting and another in Baton Rouge, Louisiana, that killed three police officers and wounded three others, local law enforcement agencies across the U.S. began re-adjusting response strategies, with more officers being paired up in patrol vehicles. (Note: While it was once standard practice to pair officers in patrol vehicles, budget cuts and other staffing demands prompted many police departments to implement more single-officer patrols.) Departments also began to increase security and surveillance at protest events against police.

Within twelve days of the shooting, DPD received 467 job applications, representing a 344% increase from the 136 applications received by the department in June. In the months before the shooting, DPD, along with other police departments across the country, had been struggling to recruit new officers. DPD had to cancel academy classes because there were not enough applicants, and also struggled in retaining officers due to a low salary. On August 25, DPD announced their goal of hiring 549 officers by October 2017, though some police and City Council officials called the effort unrealistic due to the department's strict hiring requirements.

=== Use of a police robot to kill Johnson ===
The killing of Johnson was the first time in United States history a robot was used by police to kill a suspect. The Remotec ANDROS Mark V-A1, a bomb disposal remote control vehicle used by police, was rigged with about 1 pound (0.45 kilograms) of C-4 explosive. The decision to attack Johnson with a robot was made after it was concluded that the heavily armed assailant had secured himself behind a corner at the end of a hallway, with no safe way for police to rush him or reach him with a sniper.

There were various reactions to the lethal use of a robot by police. P. W. Singer, a robotics expert at the New America Foundation, said it was the first instance of which he was aware of a robot being used lethally by police. Seth Stoughton, an assistant professor of law at the University of South Carolina, said, "This is sort of a new horizon for police technology. Robots have been around for a while, but using them to deliver lethal force raises some new issues."

To this effect, Stoughton said, "I'm not aware of any police department having on hand something that is intended to be used as a weaponized explosive." He believed that the manner in which the police used the robot was justified due to Johnson being an imminent threat to police personnel and civilians, stating, "The circumstances that justify lethal force justify lethal force in essentially every form."

== Reactions ==
Texas Governor Greg Abbott ordered the director of the Texas Department of Public Safety to offer any assistance to Dallas when requested. He also said, "In times like this we must remember—and emphasize—the importance of uniting as Americans." Texas Lieutenant Governor Dan Patrick attributed the violence to individuals on social media, "former Black Lives Matter protesters", and others with anti-police views, later expressing regret for his statement.

President Barack Obama called the shooting a "vicious, calculated, despicable attack" and a "tremendous tragedy". He also made immediate calls for gun control. The Fraternal Order of Police, the largest police union in the U.S., called for the shooting to be investigated as a hate crime and criticized President Obama's response, saying that he needed to speak for everyone and not give one speech for police officers and another one for African Americans.

Leaders associated with the Black Lives Matter movement, including organizers of the protest rally, condemned the shooting.

External videos
- "Memorial Service for Slain Dallas Police Officers", C-SPAN, July 12, 2016

On July 8, the day after the shooting, a special interfaith vigil attracted hundreds of people to Thanks-Giving Square in Downtown Dallas, where Dallas Mayor Mike Rawlings and regional faith leaders led prayers for the officers involved in the shooting and for everyone affected by it.

An interfaith memorial to the dead officers was held at Dallas's Morton H. Meyerson Symphony Center on July 12. U.S. President Barack Obama and former President George W. Bush, a Texan who previously served as the 46th Governor of Texas, spoke at the ceremony, which was also attended by then-Vice President Joe Biden. Obama praised the Dallas police as heroes and called the killings "an act not just of demented violence but of racial hatred." In the aftermath, Obama urged Americans not to give in to despair, saying, "[W]e are not so divided as we seem."

Attorney General Loretta Lynch said that agents from the ATF, FBI, Marshals Service, and other U.S. Department of Justice agencies were on the scene working with state and local agencies. Lynch stated that the proper response to uncertainty and fear "is never violence" but rather is "calm, peaceful, collaborative and determined action". Lynch also said, "To all Americans, I ask you, I implore you, do not let this week precipitate a new normal in this country."

Kalyn Chapman, a model and the first black woman to be named Miss Alabama, called the perpetrator "a martyr" in a Facebook Live video, stating: "I wasn't surprised by what the shooter did to those cops, and I think a lot of us feel the same way." Chapman subsequently told CNN that she regretted referring to Johnson as a martyr, stating: "While I detest the killing of those officers and the taking of innocent lives, I did, in a way, I understood what could drive the shooter to do something like that. I don't consider him a hero." Chapman's employer, WPBT, announced that she had been placed on administrative leave following her comments.

After the shootings at Dallas, Louisiana, and Minnesota, the Bahamian government issued a travel advisory telling citizens to use caution when traveling to the U.S. due to racial tensions. They specifically advised that young men use "extreme caution" when interacting with police and to be non-confrontational and cooperative.

== See also ==
- 1971 shooting of Dallas police officers
- Mark Essex (attacks in December 1972 and January 1973)
- 1985 MOVE bombing
- 2004 shooting of Birmingham police officers
- 2009 shootings of Oakland police officers (March 2009)
- 2009 shooting of Pittsburgh police officers (April 2009)
- 2009 Lakewood shooting (November 2009)
- Christopher Dorner shootings and manhunt (2013)
- 2014 killings of NYPD officers
- 2016 shooting of Baton Rouge police officers (July 2016)
- 2016 murders of Des Moines police officers (November 2016)
- 2020 shooting of Los Angeles police officers
- 2022 shooting of Kentucky police officers
- 2023 shooting of Fargo police officers
- 2024 shooting of Charlotte police officers
- Gun violence in the United States
- List of American police officers killed in the line of duty
- List of killings by law enforcement officers in the United States
- List of rampage killers (religious, political, or ethnic crimes)
