= Brave Cave =

Former inmate processing center

- Location: Baton Rouge, Louisiana
- Managed by: Baton Rouge Police Department

The Brave Cave (Note: An unofficial title, as the site lacks an official documented name) is a former inmate processing center, and more recently an off-site interrogation facility, in Baton Rouge, Louisiana. It was run by the Baton Rouge Police Department's street-crime squad, Brave (Baton Rouge Area Violence Elimination), until August 2023. It has been described by some as having been a 'black site' or 'torture warehouse', where detainees were held off the books and could be coerced into providing information or capitulation, beaten, or subjected to extensive cavity/strip searches. The facility came to the national forefront in 2023 following the widely publicized lawsuits of Jeremy Lee and Ternell Brown, who had been held at the facility in separate, unrelated incidents. It is currently being reviewed by the FBI as the result of a civil rights investigation into lawsuits stemming from the facility. The Deputy Chief, along with other BRPD officials, have insisted that the now defunct facility was never a cause for concern and not covert by nature.

== Background ==
Baton Rouge police indicated in a statement that the facility had been a former "processing center" where "thousands of inmates" have been processed over the years. In recent years, it fell under the command of the Street Crimes Unit, known as Brave, for interrogation purposes and "narcotics processing".

Official knowledge regarding the facility is somewhat dubious. When initially reached out to by WAFB, neither the Baton Rouge Police Chief, Murphy Paul, along with his staff, nor the BRPD spokesmen, were aware of the facility. However, the Deputy Chief, Myron Daniels, along with other leaders, were "adamant" that it had been used for years and was in no way a secretive site. Attorneys have alleged, however, that the facility is a black site:

In our view it almost seems like they take people to what we consider a black site, an area where there’s not many cameras and where people don’t really know about it and they can essentially hold you there until they decide what to do with you...I believe that he was taken to this room because there were no cameras in this room, and it was to actually beat my client. I believe that’s what it was for.

In August 2024, the facility was permanently shut down and the Brave unit was disbanded by Mayor-President Sharon Weston Broome. On February 1, 2025, as part of an exhibition with art gallery Yes We Cannibal, artist Jeremy Toussaint-Baptiste, 2025 Creative Capital awardee and inaugural Triple Canopy fellow, lead a collaborative performance outside the Brave Cave using a decommissioned LRAD to play DJ Casper's Cha Cha Slide for the purpose of gathering a crowd rather than dispersing it, an inversion of the technology's purpose. Later that month, new Mayor-President Sid Edwards announced plans to partner with the YMCA to transform the facility into a community center.

== Lawsuits ==
Several incidents occurred at the facility throughout 2023, leading to the filing of lawsuits by individuals which garnered national media attention and the opening of an FBI investigation into civil rights abuses. On June 10, Ternell Brown was pulled over, on grounds that were never identified through documentation, upon which officers switched their body cameras off and searched her without a warrant. The officers discovered that Brown had a bottle of mixed yet legal medical prescription pills. Brown attempted to provide proof of her prescriptions, but according to lawsuit filings, officers declined this and instead took her to the Brave Cave where she was forcibly strip searched, with two male officers conducting the search extensively verifying the absence of narcotics specifically in the rectal and genital areas. Brown was released after two hours without charges.

In a separate incident occurring earlier into the year on January 9, Jeremy Lee was detained in front of his home without reasonable suspicion or probable cause. Lee was then forcibly searched next to his home with the officers pulling down his pants, and then beating and shoving him around, whilst frequently muting and switching their body cams off. Lee was then taken to the Brave Cave by the two officers where they were joined by a third, with the trio engaging in a pummeling on Lee repeatedly punching and kicking him, resulting in a fractured rib, chest pains, and abrasions to the head. According to the lawsuit, the officers mocked and laughed at Lee in responses to his pleadings and visible pain. A still bodycamera image of Lee shackled in the interrogation-style warehouse is available in the lawsuit. Lee was taken to the EBR Parish Prison, which refused to accept him due to the severity of his injuries, and he was subsequently admitted to the hospital with no charges ever being filed. Troy Lawrence Jr., an officer involved in this beating, who is the son of the Deputy Chief of Patrol Operations, resigned shortly after WAFB initially broke the story.

The FBI has stated that it is currently "reviewing allegations that members of the department may have abused their authority."

== See also ==
- Homan Square facility
