= Micah Xavier Johnson =

American U.S. army reserve and mass murderer (1991–2016)

- Johnson in 2014
- Born: July 2, 1991; Magee, Mississippi, U.S.
- Died: July 8, 2016 (aged 25); Dallas, Texas, U.S.
- Cause of death: Blunt trauma from C-4 explosion
- Occupations: U.S. Army reservist, caregiver
- Known for: Perpetrator of the 2016 shooting of Dallas police officers
- Motive: Anti-police sentiment, anti-white racism

Details
- Date: July 7, 2016
- Locations: Dallas, Texas, U.S.
- Target: White police officers
- Killed: 5
- Injured: 11 (9 officers, 2 civilians)
- Weapons: Saiga AK-74 5.45×39mm semi-automatic rifle; Glock 19 Gen4 Semi-automatic handgun

Micah Xavier Johnson (July 2, 1991 – July 8, 2016) was an American Army reserve Afghan war veteran, black nationalist, and mass murderer who perpetrated the 2016 shooting of Dallas police officers during a Black Lives Matter protest. He ambushed and killed five officers and wounded eleven others in Downtown, Dallas, Texas. He was killed by police during a standoff after expressing anger over police killings of black men. The shootings were the second-deadliest targeted attack on law enforcement officers in U.S. history, surpassed only by the Young Brothers massacre of 1932, which killed six officers in Missouri.

== Early life ==
Micah Xavier Johnson was born in Magee, Mississippi, on July 2, 1991, and he was raised in Mesquite, Texas. He once described his childhood as "stressful" during a VA visit on August 15, 2014, but further details were redacted on the visit report. When he was four, his parents divorced.

Johnson transferred into John Horn High School when he was 17 and participated in its Junior Reserve Officers' Training Corps program, according to the Mesquite Independent School District. He struggled academically, graduating in 2009 with a 1.98 grade-point average and a ranking of 430 out of 453 students in his class.

In the spring of 2011, he enrolled in four classes at Richland College but never completed any of them. Investigators believed that Johnson had access to El Centro College through his enrollment at Richland, citing his pre-planned and coordinated movements throughout Building B.

== Military service ==
Immediately after high school, Johnson enlisted in the U.S. Army Reserve and served from March 2009 to April 2015 as a 12W carpentry and masonry specialist. He completed basic training, which required qualification on handling of an M16 rifle or M4 carbine, basic rifles for U.S. military personnel. According to Justin Garner, a high-school friend and classmate who later served alongside Johnson in the same unit, Johnson lacked proficiency in certain required technical skills, such as marksmanship.

Johnson was activated at the rank of private first class in September 2013 in support of the War in Afghanistan, where he was deployed from November 2013 to July 2014 with the 420th Engineer Brigade.

People who knew Johnson during his time in the Army described him as openly religious and often socializing with white soldiers. A squad leader, who trained Johnson in tactical maneuvers and protection in 2009 and 2010, described him as "klutzy", "goofy sometimes", and "a nice guy", but also quiet and unmotivated.

Documents released by the Army on July 29 detailed early signs of disturbing behavior being exhibited by him, but specific details were redacted. They also said that while Johnson was sociable, he was generally described by soldiers as a loner who sometimes ate his lunch in a vehicle alone while the rest of his unit ate outside together.

=== Discharge ===
On May 1, 2014, during his deployment, Johnson was accused of sexual harassment by a female soldier, who sought a protective order against him and said that he needed mental health counseling. The accusation was made after the soldier reported four pairs of women's underwear missing from her laundry bag. A "health and welfare inspection" of soldiers' rooms found one pair in Johnson's quarters, while a soldier discovered the remaining three in Johnson's pocket. Upon being confronted about it, Johnson fled with the undergarments and attempted to dispose of them in a nearby dumpster. He then lied that a female civilian acquaintance gave the underwear to him, but the female soldier confirmed that they were in fact hers.

The female soldier told investigators that she and Johnson had been platonic friends for five years, but had stopped talking to each other. She described their relationship as being tumultuous and involving fights and disagreements. She specifically recalled one incident where Johnson punched out a car window over her leaving for college and severed an artery, then forced her to bring him to a hospital for treatment. However, Johnson claimed that he punched out the window when the soldier missed a movie they planned to see together, and added that he had been under stress from his job and turbulent home life at the time.

According to the soldier, Johnson asked her for a pair of her underwear before the May 1 incident, but she declined. Also, during a Facebook conversation with her, Johnson mentioned "tying her down and having her face down on the bed" but then claimed the statement was a joke. Though she told him that rape was "never a joke" and to stop contacting her, the soldier did not report him for harassment at the time because she was used to that kind of rhetoric. Though the May 1 incident did not meet the Army's criteria for sexual harassment, investigators found that Johnson's sexually suggestive comments to the female soldier met said criteria.

Following the inspection, he was disarmed under the recommendation of his platoon sergeant, who felt he posed a threat. Another Army official later described the action as unusual, as Johnson did not appear to be visibly agitated or a threat to himself or others at the time. Johnson was then placed under 24-hour escort, which was reportedly a shameful and ostracizing experience, before being temporarily moved to Bagram Airfield on May 3, but he did not have enough time to pack all of his belongings. While soldiers were emptying Johnson's quarters and packing his belongings for him on May 14, they discovered an unauthorized single M430I High Explosive Dual Purpose 40mm grenade, a .50-caliber round, and another soldier's prescription medication in his sleeping bag.

Later, the Army sent Johnson back to the U.S., and according to the military lawyer who represented Johnson at the time, the Army initiated proceedings to give Johnson an "other than honorable" discharge. The lawyer claimed this was "highly unusual" because written reprimands are usually issued before more drastic steps are taken, and also because the decision was allegedly based on a single sexual harassment allegation. The lawyer was evidently unaware of the grenade and other contraband discovered in Johnson's possession shortly before he was repatriated to the United States from Afghanistan as well as other factors in Johnson's possibly redacted record. On the advice of his attorney, Johnson waived his right to a hearing in exchange for a more favorable general discharge under honorable conditions. He was honorably discharged in September 2014, apparently as a result of an Army error. Johnson remained in the Individual Ready Reserve (IRR), meaning he could be recalled into the Army if needed, and was part of the IRR at the time of his death.

Johnson received the Afghanistan Campaign Medal with campaign star, Army Achievement Medal, Global War on Terrorism Service Medal, Armed Forces Reserve Medal, and NATO Medal for his tour of duty in Afghanistan.

Some of Johnson's fellow soldiers criticized the Army's handling of the case.

== Life before the shooting ==
According to an employment application made by Johnson seven months before his death, he worked in a Jimmy John's sandwich shop in north Dallas beginning in 2010, and took a position as a quality assurance worker at a Garland, Texas, truck plant in 2012. At the time of his death, Johnson was working as an in-home caregiver for his mentally disabled adult brother. Both men lived with their mother in her home.

Johnson had no criminal record in Texas. However, the Mesquite Police Department documented an encounter with him in January 2011. According to the report, Johnson walked into their police station "visibly upset ... bouncing from side to side." He told an officer that a female friend had lied to him and that he had nowhere else to go. He also declined mental health treatment and claimed he was not a threat to himself or others. Johnson was eventually picked up from the station by a friend from his Army Reserve unit.

The Veterans Health Administration released documents in August 2016 showing that Johnson had symptoms for post-traumatic stress disorder (PTSD) following his return from Afghanistan. He was not formally diagnosed with the condition, and doctors concluded that he presented no serious risk to himself or others. Johnson had sought treatment for anxiety, depression, and hallucinations, once telling doctors that he had experienced nightmares after witnessing fellow soldiers dying in explosions. Johnson also said that he would hear voices and mortars exploding; and that after returning to the U.S., he would be paranoid, suffer from lower back pain, and experience panic attacks a few times per week. For the latter condition, he recalled one incident at a Wal-Mart that required a police response. For his conditions, Johnson was prescribed several medications, including a muscle relaxant, an antidepressant, and anti-anxiety and sleep medication.

Chief Brown said that while Johnson had been planning the shooting before the deaths of Sterling and Philando Castile, both incidents served as the trigger to commit the shooting and that he saw the Dallas protest as "an opportunity" to attack police officers. Johnson had offered to work security at an anti-Donald Trump rally led by Dallas civil rights activist Reverend Peter Johnson on June 16, but he insisted on bringing a gun, so the reverend declined.

According to police and a neighbor, Johnson practiced military exercises in his backyard. In 2014, Johnson received training and instruction at a private self-defense school that teaches tactics such as "shooting on the move" (i.e., quickly firing, then changing position and resuming gunfire). The tactic was designed to keep a gunman's location uncertain and create the impression of multiple shooters. Although the school's website does mention such training as being offered, Justin Everman, the founder of the school, stated that Johnson only took self-defense courses two years ago. Investigators believed that he began amassing his arsenal around the same time, stockpiling guns and gathering chemicals and electronic devices and PVC piping needed to build explosives.

== Shootings ==
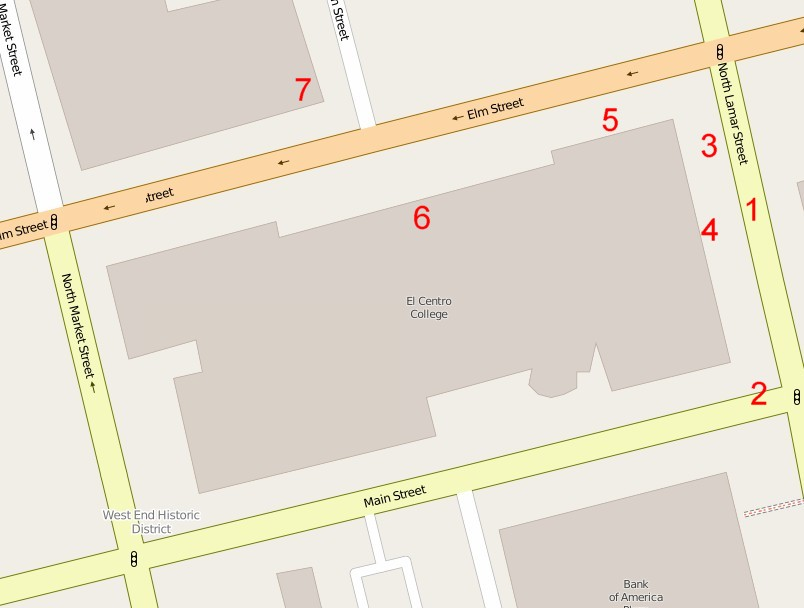
Map of events: 1. Johnson parks SUV and fires towards Main Street; 2. Senior Corporal Lorne Ahrens, Officer Patrick Zamarippa, and Officer Michael Krol are killed. Several other officers and a civilian were injured.; 3. Johnson chases down and kills DART Police Officer Brent Thompson.; 4. Johnson attempts but fails to enter the college.; 5. Johnson enters the college from Elm Street (location unknown); 6. Johnson goes to second floor, runs into a dead end, and shoots towards a 7-Eleven.; 7. 7-Eleven where Sergeant Michael Smith is shot and killed.

On July 7, 2016, a peaceful Black Lives Matter protest marched through downtown Dallas, Texas, drawing about 800 demonstrators. The event responded to the recent police killings of Alton Sterling in Baton Rouge, Louisiana, on July 5, and Philando Castile in Falcon Heights, Minnesota, on July 6—both black men shot during encounters captured on video.

Around 100 officers monitored the march, which passed near El Centro College without incident until gunfire erupted around 8:45 p.m. Johnson arrived in a dark SUV, armed with a Saiga 5.45 semi-automatic rifle, a handgun, extra ammunition, and ballistic vests. He parked near the protest's end, chatted briefly with two officers, then opened fire on police from an elevated position on Lamar Street (now Botham Jean Boulevard). He shot from behind barriers, through windows, and while moving, targeting white officers specifically. The ambush killed five officers and wounded seven more, plus two civilians. Gunfire scattered protesters in panic as Johnson used military-style tactics, like quick position changes, to prolong the assault.

=== Standoff and Johnson's death ===
Johnson fled into El Centro College's Building C, then Building B, navigating pre-planned routes with familiarity from prior enrollment at nearby Richland College. He barricaded in a parking garage, wounding more officers in close-range fights. During two-hour negotiations, he taunted police via phone—laughing, singing, asking kill counts, and claiming planted bombs (none found). He admitted solo action, rage at White officers, and no group ties. At 2:30 a.m. on July 8, SWAT ended the standoff by detonating a bomb via remote-controlled robot in the garage, killing Johnson. This marked the first U.S. police use of such a tactic.

=== Victims and investigation findings ===
The slain officers were: Brent Thompson (Transit Authority, 36), Patrick Zamarripa (Dallas PD, 33), Michael Krol (Dallas PD, 40), Lorne Ahrens (Dallas PD, 48), and Michael Smith (Dallas PD, 55). Wounded officers included Sheik Smith and John Mitchell; civilians wounded were She Tamara El-Sobky and Hillary Castro. Searches of Johnson's home revealed bomb-making materials, rifles, vests, and notes on tactics, suggesting plans for a larger attack. He had practiced explosions and honed skills post-discharge, including marksmanship.

=== Aftermath and impact ===
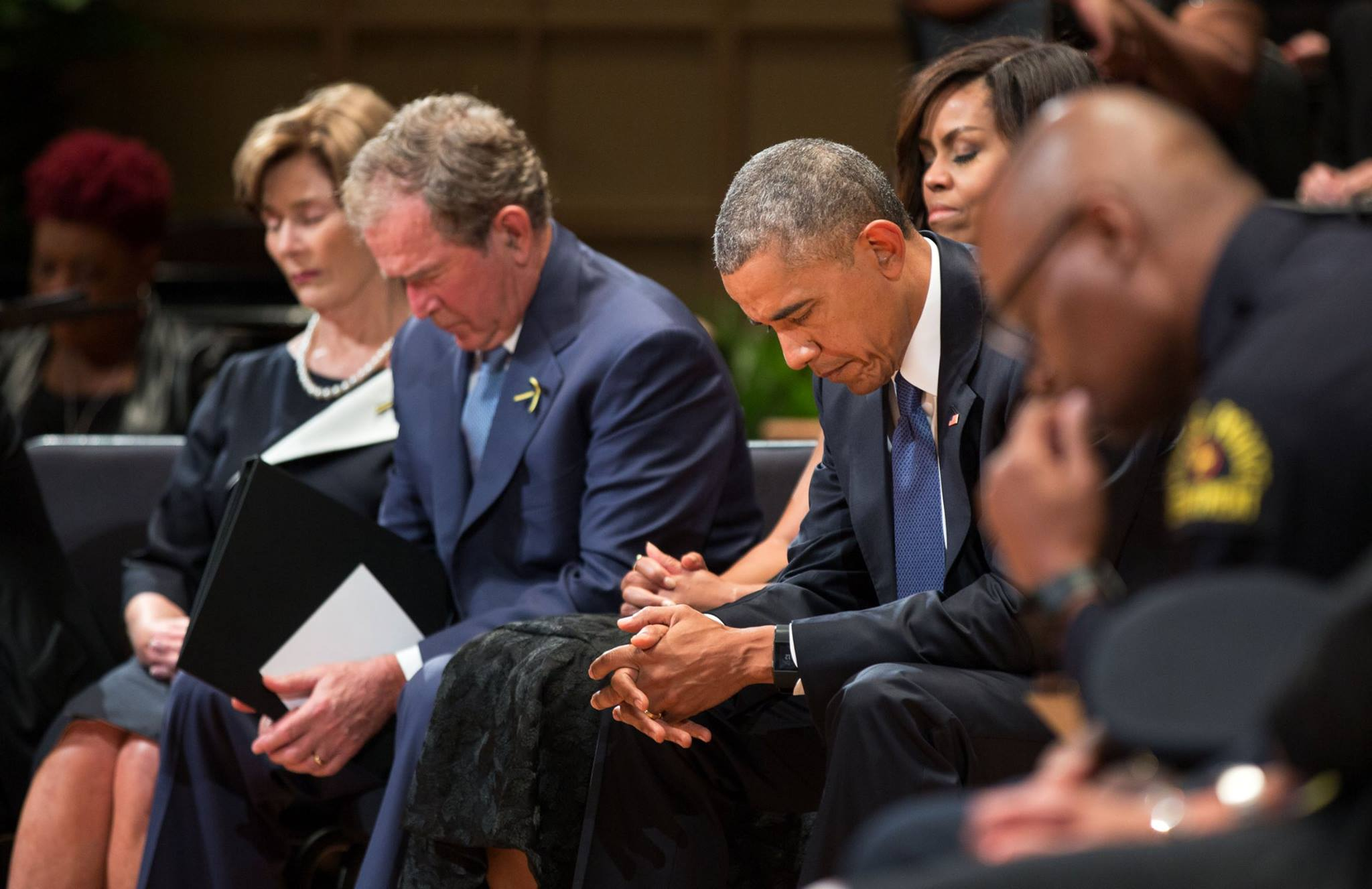
Former first lady Laura Bush, former President George W Bush, President Barack Obama and First Lady Michelle Obama at a memorial service for one of the officers killed in the shooting

Dallas mourned with vigils and memorials, while national protests against police violence continued amid grief. President Barack Obama, the first African American president of the United States, called Johnson a "demented individual" and formed a task force on race and policing. The incident fueled debates on gun control, race relations, and veteran mental health—Johnson had sought VA treatment for stress and anxiety but showed no prior violent signs to friends.

El Centro College canceled all classes on July 8. Police barricaded the perimeter and began canvassing the crime scene. The explosion that killed Johnson also destroyed the school's servers, further delaying reopening. The school partially reopened on July 20, with staff returning that day and students on the following day. Buildings A, B, and C remained closed pending the FBI investigation.

== Motive ==
Chief Brown said that Johnson, who was black, was furious about recent police shootings of black men and "stated he wanted to kill white people, especially officers". A friend and former coworker of Johnson's described him as "always [being] distrustful of the police." Another former coworker said he seemed "very affected" by recent police shootings of black men. A friend said that Johnson had anger management problems and would repeatedly watch videos of the 1991 beating of Rodney King by police officers. Brown said that Johnson had told police negotiators that he was angry about Black Lives Matter. Police said they had found no direct ties between Johnson and Black Lives Matter protesters, and believed the suspect had been planning an attack for some time and acted on his own.

An investigation into his online activities uncovered his interest in Black nationalist groups. The Southern Poverty Law Center (SPLC), and news outlets reported that Johnson "liked" the Facebook pages of Black nationalist organizations such as the New Black Panther Party (NBPP), Nation of Islam, and Black Riders Liberation Party, three groups which are listed by the SPLC as hate groups. On Facebook, Johnson posted an angry and "disjointed" post against white people on July 2, several days before the attack.

NBPP head Quanell X said after the shooting that Johnson had been a member of the NBPP's Houston chapter for about six months, several years before. Quanell X added that Johnson had been "asked to leave" the group for violating the organization's "chain of command" and espousing dangerous rhetoric, such as asking the NBPP why they had not purchased more weapons and ammunition, and expressing his desire to harm black church preachers because he believed they were more interested in money than God. Following the shooting, a national NBPP leader distanced the group from Johnson, saying that he "was not a member of" the party.

Further investigation into his digital footprint showed that Johnson visited the sites of Marxist Leninist groups associated with "Revolutionary Black Nationalism", a left wing counterpart of right wing "black nationalism". He also posted multiple BPP posters and other forms of far-left propaganda, some of which called for a "class war", though this is contradictory to other posts and likes he made. Johnson "liked" the Facebook page of the African American Defense League, whose leader, Mauricelm-Lei Millere, called for the murders of police officers across the U.S. following the 2014 murder of Laquan McDonald. In response to the police killing of Alton Sterling, the organization had "posted a message earlier in the week encouraging violence against police".

Johnson's Facebook profile photo depicted Johnson raising his arm in a Black Power salute, along with images of a Black Power symbol and a flag associated with the Pan-Africanism movement. These symbols have long represented Black empowerment, but have also been co-opted by reactionary groups with bigoted views.

Conversely, people familiar with Johnson during his military service believed he may have been severely stressed with serving in a combat zone. They also said he had little interest in the topics of racial injustice and the killing of Trayvon Martin that occurred at the time. In an interview, Johnson's parents said that he was once extroverted and patriotic, and wanted to become a police officer. Following his discharge from the Army, they described him as disillusioned, reclusive, and resentful of the U.S. government; and believed he had been disappointed by his experience in the military. According to a soldier, Johnson had a small breakdown after he began losing his friends in the Army after details of the sexual harassment accusation were released.
