= 2016 shooting of Baton Rouge police officers =

Mass shooting in Louisiana, U.S.

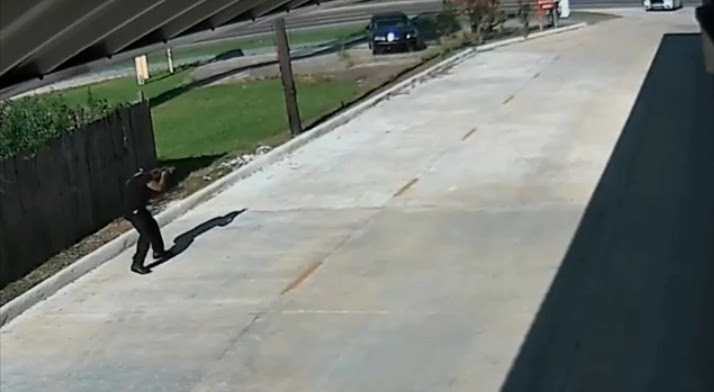
- A CCTV still of Long firing at a Baton Rouge Police squad car
- Location: 30.4338°N 91.0817°W; Baton Rouge, Louisiana, U.S.
- Date: July 17, 2016; 10 years ago 8:42 – c. 8:48 a.m. (CDT)
- Target: Police officers in Baton Rouge
- Attack type: Ambush, domestic terrorism, shootout, mass murder, mass shooting
- Weapons: 5.56 IWI Tavor SAR semi-automatic rifle; 9mm Springfield Armory XD semi-automatic pistol; 5.56 Stag Arms M4-type AR-15 semi-automatic rifle (Unused)
- Deaths: 5 (Note: including a victim who died in 2022) (including the perpetrator)
- Injuries: 2
- Perpetrator: Gavin Eugene Long
- Motive: Backlash over police brutality against African Americans (Note: The motive can be specifically attributed to Long's outrage over the shooting of Alton Sterling in Baton Rouge, which had happened just a few weeks prior, as well as by killings of African-Americans by police officers in general.)
- Litigation: Federal lawsuit against Black Lives Matter by Tullier dismissed

On July 17, 2016, Gavin Eugene Long shot six police officers in Baton Rouge, Louisiana, United States, in an ambush attack, in the wake of the killing of Alton Sterling. Four died, including one who was critically wounded and died from complications in 2022, and two others were hospitalized; of the officers who initially died, two were members of the Baton Rouge Police Department, while the third worked for the East Baton Rouge Parish Sheriff's Office. Long, who associated himself with organizations linked to black separatism and the sovereign citizen movement, was shot and killed by a SWAT officer during a shootout with police at the scene.

== Background ==
The shooting occurred during a period of unrest in Baton Rouge, though it is unclear if the events are related. Baton Rouge was experiencing ongoing protests following the officer-involved killing of Alton Sterling less than two weeks before on July 5. On July 7, the FBI's New Orleans field office issued a warning about "threats to law enforcement and potential threats to the safety of the general public" stemming from the death of Sterling. Within the previous week, four suspects were arrested in connection with an alleged plot to kill Baton Rouge police officers, which was described as a credible threat by law enforcement officials. Ten days earlier, five police officers were killed in a mass shooting in Dallas.

== Attack ==
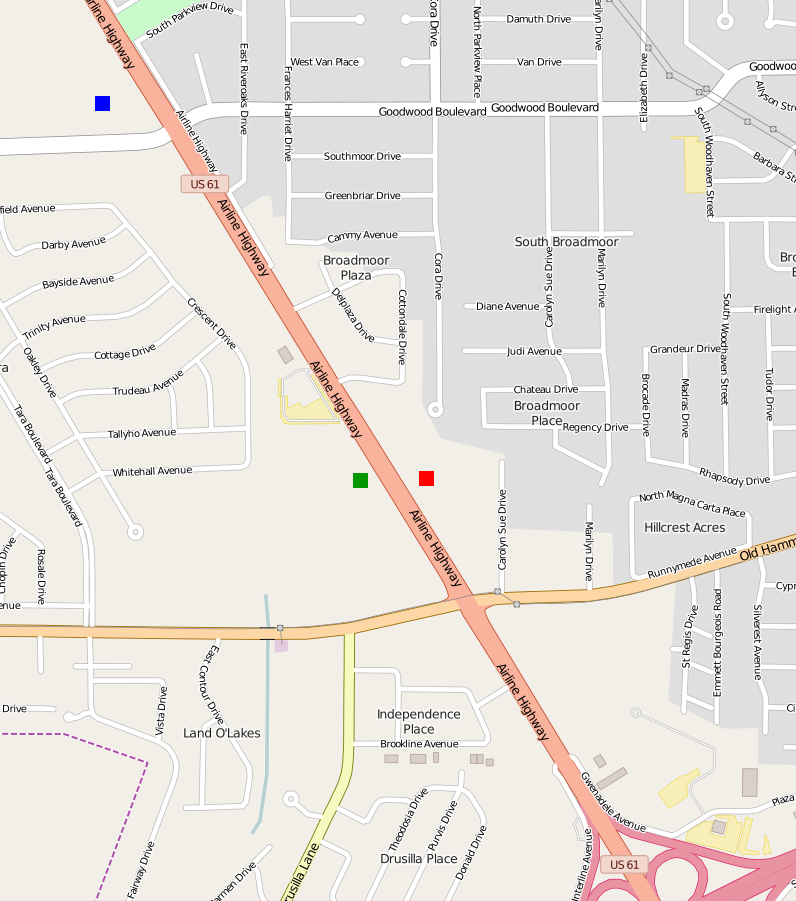
Map of area around Airline Highway near I-12: Hammond Aire Plaza, where Long began the shooting sometime before 8:40 a.m. The area around B-Quik convenience store and Hair Crown Beauty Supply where Long shot six police officers, killing three, until he was shot and killed by SWAT at 8:48 a.m. The Baton Rouge Police Department headquarters, where protests in response to the police killing of Alton Sterling took place in the weeks prior to the shooting by Long.

Long arrived at Hammond Aire Plaza, a shopping complex on Airline Highway, sometime before 8:40 a.m. CT and began scouting the area in search of police officers. He first spotted a police patrol vehicle parked at a B-Quik convenience store; it belonged to a sheriff's deputy who was working security in the area. Long parked his vehicle behind an adjacent building, got out, and prepared to shoot, but found that the vehicle was empty. He then drove north and noticed a police officer washing his vehicle a short distance away, but the officer left before Long could get close.

By 8:40 a.m., police received a call about a suspicious person carrying a rifle near the plaza. However, due to Louisiana's open carry law at the time, the potential threat of Long was downplayed, with one dispatcher describing him as a "subject walking with a coat and an assault rifle." Authorities were going to question him and had no probable cause to take him into custody.

When officers arrived at the scene, they found Long clad in black and wearing a face mask behind the Hair Crown Beauty Supply store on the 9600 block of Airline Highway. Shots were reportedly fired two minutes later. Another two minutes afterwards, there were reports that officers were down.

According to investigators, Long fired upon the first responding officers, fatally wounding three. He first shot and killed a police officer, and shot and wounded his partner who fell to the ground. A third officer tried to help the wounded policeman, but Long engaged him in a gunfight as he approached, and killed him with multiple gunshot wounds. Long then shot the first wounded officer twice more, killing him as well. Long then turned around and shot another police officer standing outside a store and then moved to another part of the complex, where he shot and wounded two sheriff's deputies who were investigating his car. At 8:46 a.m., he was reported to be near Benny's Car Wash. Officers fired on Long from behind the cover of patrol cars. Eventually, a SWAT team responded to the scene; one member took aim at Long from about 100 yards (91 m) away and killed him at about 8:48 a.m. Louisiana State Police said Long was the only person involved in the shooting. The entire shooting lasted for less than ten minutes.

During the gunfight, the assailant discharged his weapons a total of 43 times, meanwhile the police discharged a combined total of 106 rounds, 45 of which struck the assailant.

Officers used a robot to check Long's body for explosives. A preliminary investigation determined that Long was targeting officers and ignoring civilians. A preliminary autopsy indicated that in addition to being shot by the SWAT officer, Long suffered multiple other gunshot wounds. The autopsy also found traces of crystal meth and a low level of alcohol in his system.

Police recovered from the crime scene an IWI Tavor SAR 5.56x45-caliber semi-automatic rifle and a Springfield Armory XD 9mm pistol. A third weapon—a M4-type 5.56-caliber semi-automatic rifle from Stag Arms—was recovered from Long's rental Malibu. Officials believed Long had intentions of attacking the Baton Rouge police headquarters and continuing to kill officers.

== Victims ==
Two Baton Rouge Police Department (BRPD) officers and one East Baton Rouge Parish sheriff's deputy were killed in the shooting, while three others, a police officer and two sheriff's deputies were injured. Police Officer Chad Montgomery was grazed by a single bullet in the head, Sheriff's Deputy Cpl. Nicholas Tullier was shot and wounded three times in the head, abdomen and upper arm and Sgt. Bruce Simmons was hit once in the left arm. The injured were transported to Our Lady of the Lake Regional Medical Center, which said it received five patients from the shooting, three of whom later died from multiple gunshot wounds. Of the surviving two, one was in critical condition, being on life support as of August 3, and the other in fair condition. The third injured officer was transported to Baton Rouge General Medical Center and treated for non-life-threatening injuries. The critically injured officer was moved to TIRR Memorial Hermann, a recovery facility in Houston, Texas, on November 16.

The officers killed were identified as:

- Deputy Bradford Allen 'Brad' Garafola, 45, who had been with the East Baton Rouge Parish Sheriff's Office since 1992.
- Officer Matthew Lane Gerald, 41, a Marine who had been with the BRPD for four months.
- Corporal Montrell Lyle Jackson, 32, who had been with the BRPD since 2006.
- Sergeant Nicholas Tullier, 46, succumbed to his injuries on May 5, 2022, he was posthumously promoted to the rank of Sergeant by the East Baton Rouge Parish Sheriff's Office.

== Perpetrator ==
Long in a video on July 10, 2016, a week before he committed the shooting

Gavin Eugene Long (July 17, 1987 – July 17, 2016) was identified as the shooter. He was a resident of Kansas City, Missouri. In May 2015, Long filed papers in Jackson County, Missouri, to change his legal name to Cosmo Ausar Setepenra, but court officials there said he never completed the process of legally changing his name. Long was believed to have traveled more than 700 miles (1,100 km) from his hometown to Baton Rouge using a rental car. He was also believed to have been in Baton Rouge for "several days" prior to the shooting. Long committed the shooting on his 29th birthday.

Long's body was released to his family on July 26, and a funeral was planned in Arkansas for a later date.

=== Personal life ===
Long grew up in Kansas City and graduated from high school in 2005. His parents divorced when he was eleven, and his father was neglectful of Long, according to court records. He failed to appear on scheduled visits with his son while the divorce was pending, and did not deliver birthday or Christmas presents to him. Court records described one instance where Long was picked up by his father, but dropped off at a day care facility at a casino shortly after.

Long served in the U.S. Marine Corps as a data network specialist from August 22, 2005, to August 1, 2010. He was honorably discharged with the rank of sergeant. During his military service, he was deployed to Iraq from June 2008 to January 2009. He was also assigned to units in San Diego, California, and Okinawa, Japan. Long was awarded the Good Conduct Medal, along with an Iraq Campaign Medal, a National Defense Service Medal, a Navy Unit Commendation, and others.

Following his military service, Long told relatives and friends that he suffered from posttraumatic stress disorder (PTSD). He reportedly had prescriptions for Ativan and Valium, both anti-anxiety drugs; Lunesta, a sleep aid; and citalopram, an antidepressant. Health records from the U.S. Department of Veterans Affairs (VA) reportedly indicated contacts with Long from 2008 to August 2013. The VA records said that Long told doctors that he contracted PTSD after a friend showed him photos of maimed and decapitated bodies while they were in Iraq. In November 2011, doctors contradicted Long's suspicions of PTSD and instead diagnosed him as having "adjustment disorder with depressed mood." They eventually concluded that he was mentally stable, with no evidence that he was a threat to himself or others. According to Long's mother, the VA then sent him a letter denying him further treatment on the grounds that his disorder was not related to his military service. Long's mental health and related combat experience may have been a factor leading to the shooting.

Long graduated from Central Texas College, attending the college's San Diego site at Marine Corps Air Station Miramar and via an online education program from fall 2007 to summer 2011; he received an associate of arts degree in general studies. Long studied at Clark Atlanta University during the 2012–13 academic year. Long also spent one semester at the University of Alabama, in spring 2012, with his name making it to the Dean's List as a general business major. According to local court records, Long had no criminal record and was married for two years before the couple divorced.

=== Views and statements ===
Long was identified as a "black separatist" by a law enforcement official. Dr. Michael Stone, a psychiatry professor, said that Long displayed hallmarks of a "disgruntled, paranoid loner", with a narcissistic and grandiose personality.

Social media posts indicated that he was an active member of the anti-government New Freedom Group. According to CNN, a card was found on Long's body, suggesting that he was a member of the Washitaw Nation, a group of African Americans associated with the sovereign citizen movement that originated in Richwood. In addition to changing his legal name, he claimed his nationality was "United Washitaw de Dugdahmoundyah Mu'ur", (Note: Washitaw de Dugdahmoundyah is another name for the Washitaw Nation. Mu'ur is claimed by Washitaw Nation members to be the accurate spelling of Moors, a civilization that developed after the Arab conquest of North Africa.) and expressed his support for the Moorish Science Temple of America, another African American organization associated with the sovereign citizen movement. However, Long disavowed all prior associations in a recent video, saying, "Don't affiliate me with nothing. ... I'm affiliated with the spirit of justice."

In April 2015, while in West Africa, Long also became a member of a group dedicated to helping "Targeted Individuals" suffering from "remote brain experimentation, remote neural monitoring of an entire humans body." He asked to be put on the group's "buddy list", but he unexpectedly deactivated his account a month later. His mother said he once believed the Central Intelligence Agency was following him. He appeared as a guest on an online show discussing "Targeted Individuals", but downplayed his belief that he was being tracked, saying, "That's just a small aspect of me. It's not a complete picture of who I am." However, the show's host, who had frequent phone and email correspondence with Long, claimed that Long was adamant about being tracked during their communications.

In a "rambling" series of YouTube clips, Long claimed to be a former Nation of Islam member and referred to Alton Sterling, a black man killed by Baton Rouge police officers on July 5, in online videos. Long operated a YouTube channel under the name Cosmo Setepenra, making references to oppression against blacks and police protests. At one point less than two weeks before committing the shooting, Long called the shootings of five Dallas police officers an act of "justice". In one video, he said, "One hundred percent of revolutions... have been successful through fighting back through bloodshed." In another, he said the act of peaceful protesting was a futile method based on emotion and was easily forgettable. Long also maintained a personal website in which he described himself as a "freedom strategist, mental game coach, nutritionist, author and spiritual advisor." The website contained dozens of additional videos and podcasts.

Long wrote and self-published (also under the name Cosmo Setepenra) three books about "how to be a strong man" and self-empowerment for black males, which all appeared on Amazon.com in October and November 2015. The books were described by book critic Michael Schaub as "bizarre" works featuring a "combination of New Age-style jargon, pseudoscience, motivational bromides, health tips and racial theory." In the books, Long harshly criticized Western medicine, denied the germ theory of disease, and asserted that "[t]he abundance of Melanin in Black humans produces a superior organism both mentally and physically." The books were pulled from Amazon.com after the shooting. According to one of his books, he spent two years in several African countries studying their histories and cultures. In addition to the books, Long wrote two diaries—one in 2014 and the other in 2015—where he shared "rambling thoughts" about philosophy, religion, and politics.

Sahib Taylor, a nephew of Long, told The Los Angeles Times that his uncle would teach him about the importance of self-reliance, share his views on racism, and assert that "only advanced survival skills and decisive action" could overthrow the U.S. government. Taylor said that Long recently began sharing his beliefs that international corporations, federal banks, and political organizations were influencing ethnic groups for their own gain; and that the government was using police to control and kill people.

=== Before the shooting ===
Within the preceding six months, Long visited the shooting range of a gun shop in Olathe, Kansas, and purchased a target that he used in shooting practice, according to an employee. The same employee also said Long did not purchase any firearms or exhibit any strange behavior at the store.

In a ten-minute video, Long claimed that he arrived at Baton Rouge not to protest Sterling's death, but to educate local blacks. He also expressed his distaste for white people and mentioned Huey P. Newton, co-founder of the Black Panther Party, in a rambling, one-sided conversation. He had previously made a similar recording using a body camera while visiting barbershops in Dallas sometime after the shooting there, to promote one of his books. A friend said that Long visited him in DeSoto, Texas, two days after the Dallas shooting; during the visit, Long obsessively watched video footage of Sterling's death and praised the Dallas shooter Micah Xavier Johnson, saying "at least he did something". The same friend said that Long also showed him a Washitaw Nation card and unsuccessfully urged him to join. Long's mother said that he would get upset at news stories of black men being shot by police, often renting cars and using them to drive to locations where such shootings occurred to pass out his books.

Less than an hour before the shooting, Long purportedly emailed a three-page, handwritten letter, self-described as a "manifesto", to a Columbus, Ohio, musician whose YouTube videos he commented on. In the letter, Long described his belief that the shooting was necessary to "create substantial change within America's police force." He also wrote his belief that there was a "concealed war" between "good cops" and "bad cops", and that he had to attack "bad cops" as vengeance for perceived destruction that they continued to inflict on blacks.

== Aftermath ==
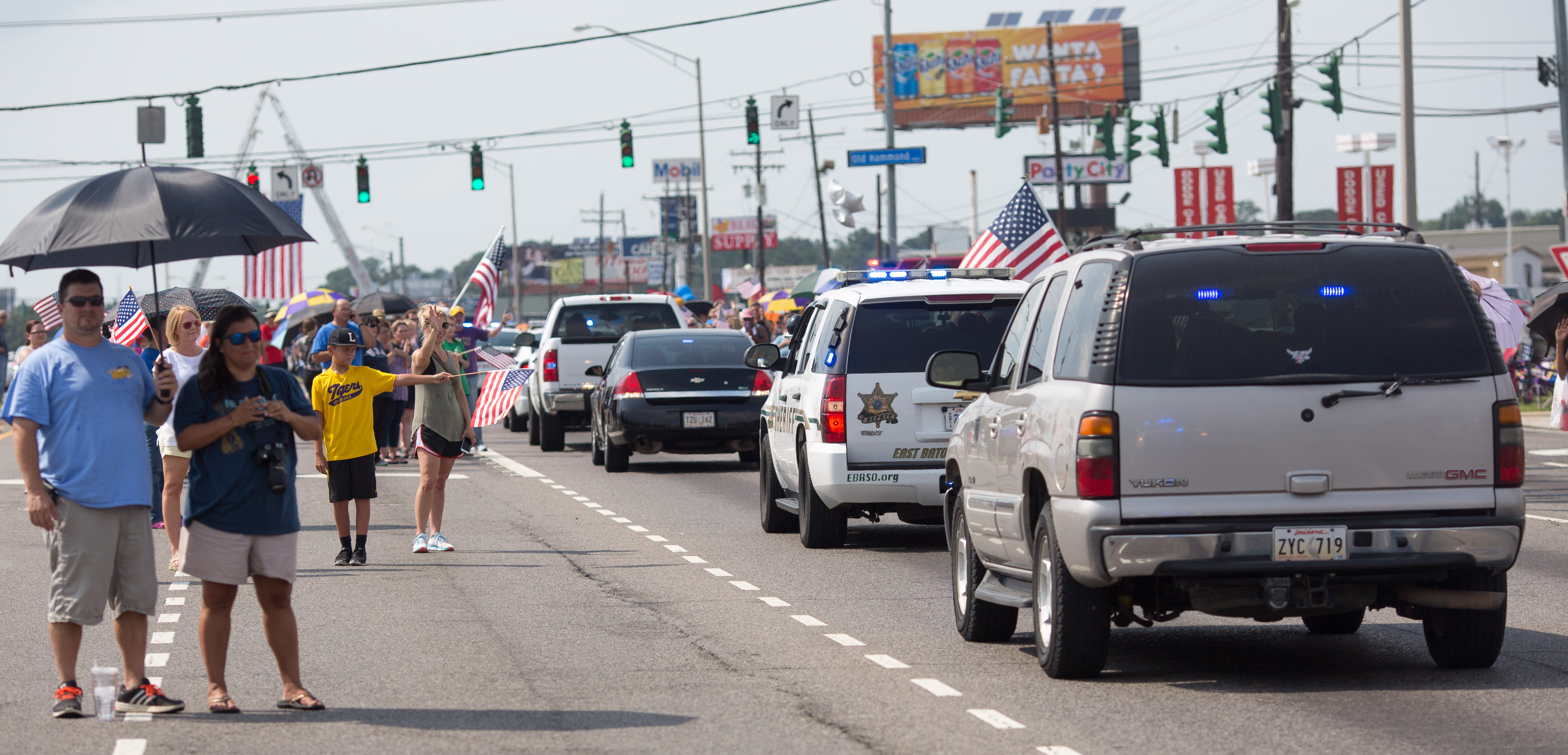
Funeral procession for one of the fallen officers on July 23, 2016

Although Long was said to have acted alone in the shooting, police arrested and questioned two other people in Addis as part of the investigation. They were later identified as Damarcus Alexander, a cousin of slain victim Corporal Montrell Jackson, and Alexander's friend Den'Trell White. According to them, police held them for seven hours, barring them from making any phone calls and refusing to give Alexander diabetic medication even after they were made aware of his condition. Both were eventually released without any charges being filed. At the time, Alexander was unaware of Jackson's death during the shooting. A spokesman for the Louisiana State Police responded to Alexander's claim of police mistreatment, saying, "No complaints or concerns have been brought to our attention."

Following this shooting and a previous one in Dallas, Texas, that killed five police officers and wounded nine others, local law enforcement agencies across the U.S. began readjusting response strategies, with more officers being paired up in patrol vehicles. (Note: While it was once standard practice to pair officers in patrol vehicles, budget cuts and other staffing demands prompted many police departments to implement more single-officer patrols.)

On July 28, the victims of the shooting were honored at a memorial service in Healing Place Church in Baton Rouge. Hundreds of people were in attendance. Governor Edwards, Vice President Joe Biden, Attorney General Loretta Lynch, and the wives of the victims made speeches during the service.

=== Louisiana's open carry law ===
The shooting renewed attention on Louisiana's open carry law, which some law enforcement officials have expressed discomfort about, believing that openly carrying citizens could complicate police matters. Some elected officials have made calls for a reevaluation of the state's open carry law. However, previous attempts at altering state gun laws have resulted in failure due to an amendment to the Louisiana State Constitution in 2012, which gave strong gun ownership protection laws and required limitations of any kind to be faced with strict scrutiny. State Senator Jean-Paul Morrell remarked that gun control bills filed every year in the state are "almost universally unsuccessful." James Gill, a columnist with The Advocate wrote an op-ed addressing the state gun laws and their legal complications on August 11.

=== Reactions ===
President Barack Obama condemned the shooting in a statement and added, "These are attacks on public servants, on the rule of law, and on civilized society, and they have to stop." Later that day, he ordered for all flags in the U.S. to be flown at half-staff in honor of the victims. On July 22, Obama met with law enforcement officials in Washington, D.C., and pledged solidarity in the wake of this shooting and another in Dallas.

Governor John Bel Edwards released a statement immediately after the shooting, saying, "This is an unspeakable and unjustified attack on all of us at a time when we need unity and healing." On the day after, he called the shooting "pure evil" and "a diabolical attack on the very fabric of society."

In an interview, Mayor Kip Holden recommended police agencies across the U.S. to put their officers on high alert and urged Americans to be "vocal about their support for law enforcement".

=== Legal ===
On June 30, 2017, district attorney Hillar C. Moore, III released a report, clearing the officers who killed Long of wrongdoing.

In July 2017, injured deputy Tullier filed a federal lawsuit against several leaders of Black Lives Matter for inciting violence. The lawsuit was later dismissed.

=== Death of Nick Tullier ===
Following nearly six years of treatment, shooting victim Cpl. Nicholas Tullier died on May 5, 2022, from complications due to injuries sustained during the shooting. He was posthumously promoted to the rank of Sergeant.

== See also ==
- 2014 killings of NYPD officers
- 2016 shooting of Dallas police officers
- 2016 shootings of Des Moines police officers
- 2020 shooting of Los Angeles police officers
- 2022 shooting of Kentucky police officers
- Gun violence in the United States
- List of American police officers killed in the line of duty
- List of killings by law enforcement officers in the United States
