= Homan Square facility =

US interrogation compound in Chicago, Illinois

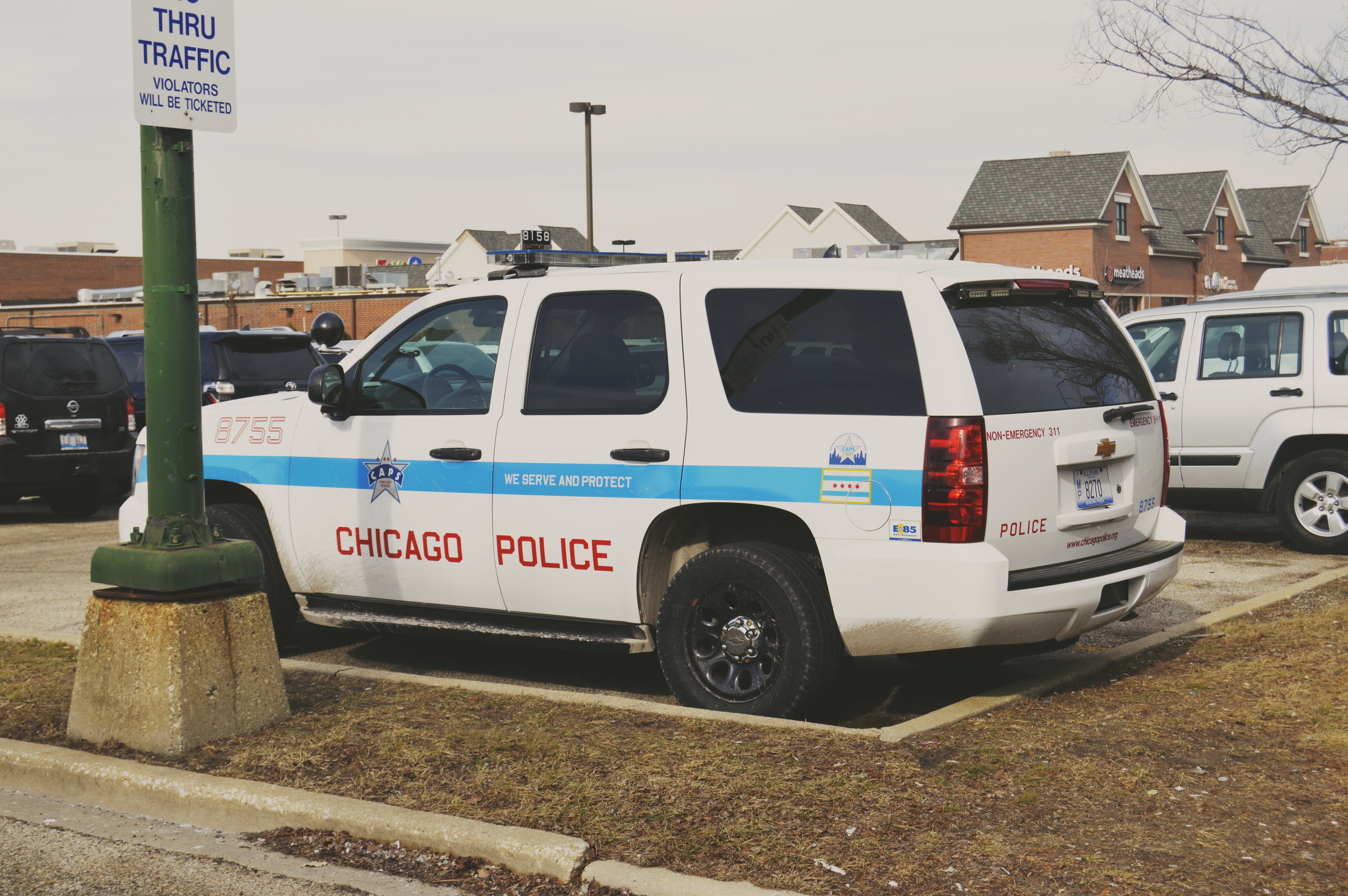

- Location within Chicago metropolitan area
- Location: Chicago, Illinois, U.S.; 41.8684°N 87.71°W
- Opened: 1999; 27 years ago

The Chicago Police Department's Homan Square facility is a former Sears, Roebuck and Company warehouse on the city's West Side. The facility houses the department's Evidence and Recovered Property Section. In 2015, the facility gained worldwide notoriety when the American journalist Spencer Ackerman wrote a series of articles in The Guardian comparing it to a CIA black site. After publication, some activists described it as a "secret torture site." Ackerman asserted that people were detained at the facility without a public record of their whereabouts, and that lawyers were often denied access.

== The Guardian series ==
In February 2015, Ackerman published a series of articles in The Guardian describing the Homan Square facility as "an off-the-books interrogation compound, rendering Americans unable to be found by family or attorneys while locked inside what lawyers say is the domestic equivalent of a CIA black site." Ackerman asserted that the Homan Square facility was the "scene of secretive work by special police units," where the "basic constitutional rights" of "poor, black and brown" Chicago city residents were violated. Ackerman asserted that "Chicagoans who end up inside do not appear to have a public, searchable record entered into a database indicating where they are, as happens when someone is booked at a precinct. Lawyers and relatives insist there is no way of finding their whereabouts. Those lawyers who have attempted to gain access to Homan Square are most often turned away, even as their clients remain in custody inside."

=== NATO 3 ===
According to the Chicago Tribune, Ackerman's series, and much of the online activism against the Homan Square facility, emerged initially as a response to several people who were arrested at the 2012 Chicago summit, who became known as the "NATO 3." Claims that the men had been "disappeared" emerged after Superintendent Garry McCarthy denied any arrests had been made, while the men were being held at Homan Square. Lawyers for the NATO 3 challenged the handling of their clients at Homan Square and filed a motion for statements made at the facility to be withdrawn as trial evidence. The incident of the NATO 3 was a crucial moment for the development of Homan Square's reputation.

== Reception ==
Ackerman's characterization of the Homan Square facility as a black site was met with resistance by some defense attorneys and legal researchers in Chicago. According to University of Chicago law professor Craig Futterman, the problems described in Ackerman's article were widespread throughout the city of Chicago, rather than being particular to the one facility. Futterman stated, "If there’s a risk, I think it’s elevating this facility. And making it look like there’s a problem in one particular station, as opposed to there’s a broader systemic problem to people who are very vulnerable who are denied their basic fundamental constitutional right." Richard Dvorak, a longtime criminal defense attorney, also said he was unaware of any issues unique to Homan Square; he stated, "Everything that was described (in the Guardian story) was something that happens every day. I think it's pretty systemic throughout CPD." Eliza Solowiej, the executive director of First Defense Legal Aid stated, "It's not just this facility. This is a citywide problem."

== CPD response ==
In response to The Guardian series, the Chicago Police Department denied any wrongdoing. In a statement, the Department stated, "CPD abides by all laws, rules and guidelines pertaining to any interviews of suspects or witnesses, at Homan Square or any other CPD facility. If lawyers have a client detained at Homan Square, just like any other facility, they are allowed to speak to and visit them. It also houses CPD's Evidence Recovered Property Section, where the public is able to claim inventoried property. There are always records of anyone who is arrested by CPD, and this is not any different at Homan Square." Some Chicago defense attorneys, however, called this response "laughable," with one stating, "The denial that the police spokesman made was way over the top and unjustified because we do know from those terrorism cases that there were abuses. Whether or not it's some (black site) plot? OK, I might be skeptical of that."

== Burge reparations ==
In 2015, as Chicago was experiencing activist pressure resulting from outrage over the Homan Square reporting and the murder of Laquan McDonald, the city under Mayor Rahm Emanuel announced a reparations deal for the 1970s survivors of torture and detention under former Chicago Police Commander Jon Burge. The deal included a $5.5 million fund for torture survivors, free city college tuition for survivors and their families, a memorial, and inclusion of the torture cases in eighth- and tenth-graders history courses in the Chicago School District. A coalition of Chicago activists, including Project NIA and We Charge Genocide, were major backers of the deal.

== See also ==
- Brave Cave
