= John Horn High School =

- Logo of John Horn High School

Location
- 3300 East Cartwright Road; Mesquite, Texas 75181; United States; 32°43′55″N 96°33′25″W

Information
- Type: Free public
- Established: 2000
- School district: Mesquite Independent School District
- Principal: Deeadra Brown
- Teaching staff: 185.41 (FTE)
- Grades: 9–12
- Enrollment: 2,874 (2023-2024)
- Student to teacher ratio: 15.50
- Campus type: Suburban
- Colors: Red, Black and White
- Mascot: Jaguar
- Website: hornhighschool.mesquiteisd.org

Dr. John D. Horn High School is a secondary school in Mesquite, Texas, United States. The school serves the southern portion of Mesquite and the Mesquite ISD portion of Seagoville.

John Horn High School, which serves grades 9 through 12, is a part of the Mesquite Independent School District. The school is under the UIL AAAAAA (or 6A) division. The Jaguar is the school mascot, and the school colors are red, black, and white.

== History ==
John Horn High School is the second-newest high school opened in the Mesquite Independent School District. It is named after the former superintendent Dr. John D. Horn.

The school opened in 2000 with only 9th and 10th grade classes. The enrollment in that first school year was approximately 550. In the 2006-2007 school year, its enrollment was over 2,000 students. Ronnie Pardun was the first principal of the school, succeeded by Bruce Perkins.

For the 1st time, Horn’s marching band advanced to the UIL State Marching Contest in 2018, in which they placed 22nd, making it the 2nd school in Mesquite to participate in the UIL State Marching competition.

== Standard dress ==
All students at Horn are required to dress according to a standardized dress code (similar to a school uniform). As of 2005, the code is at all Mesquite ISD middle and high schools.

== Notable alumni ==
- Quincy Acy, professional basketball player (class of 2008)
- Charles Demmings, NFL cornerback for the Minnesota Vikings (class of 2021)
- Taylor Gabriel, former professional football player (class of 2009)
- Jakeem Grant, professional football player currently playing for the Cleveland Browns (class of 2011)
- De'Vante Harris, former professional football player (class of 2012)
- Micah Xavier Johnson, former soldier in the U.S. Army Reserve and perpetrator of the 2016 shooting of Dallas police officers (class of 2009)
- JaCorey Shepherd, former professional football player (class of 2011)
- Megan Shipman, voice actress and ADR director (class of 2010)
