= Baton Rouge Police Department =

- Patch of the BRPD

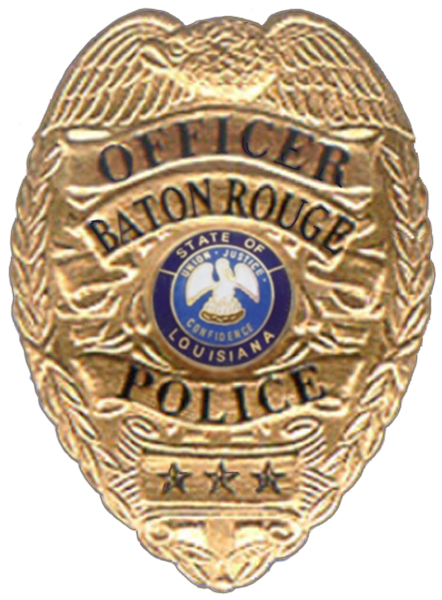
- BRPD Badge
- Abbreviation: BRPD
- Motto: One city, one mission.

Agency overview
- Formed: 1865
- Employees: 837
- Annual budget: US$98,325,000 (2025)

Jurisdictional structure
- Operations jurisdiction: Baton Rouge, Louisiana, USA
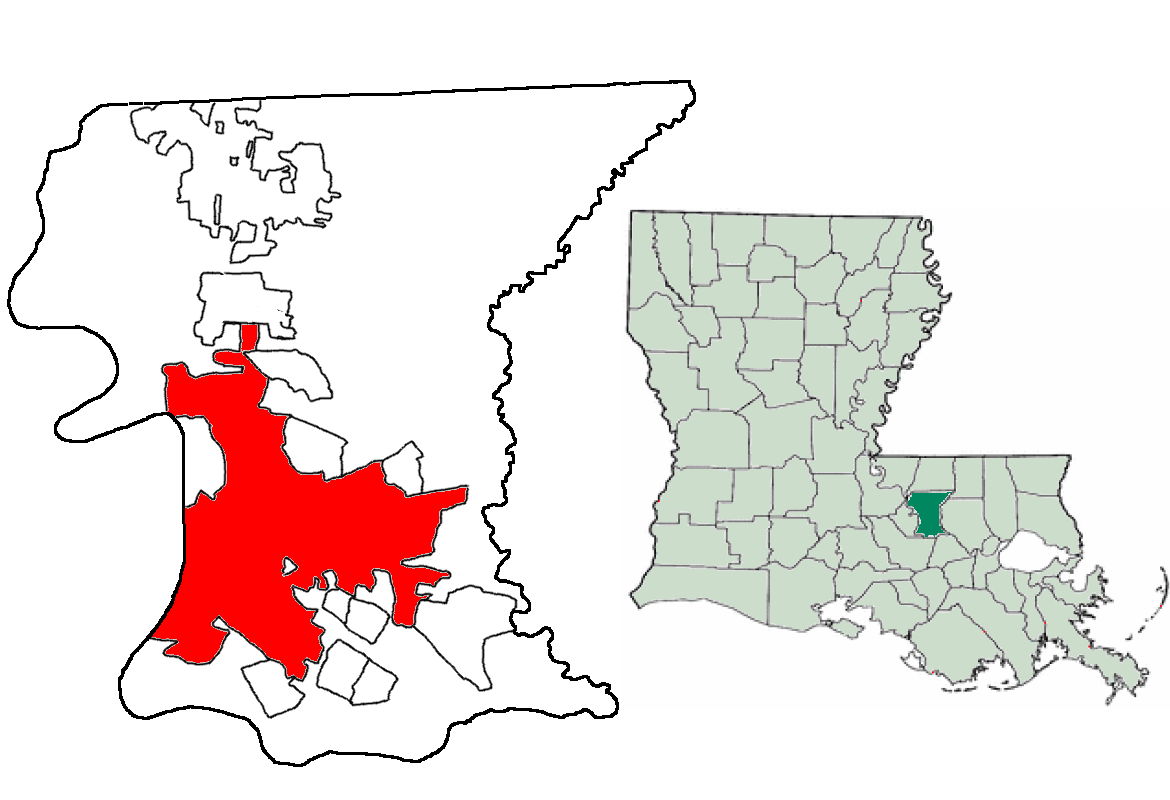
- Map of Baton Rouge Police Department's jurisdiction
- Area: 86.32 sq mi (223.6 km^{2})
- Population: 219,573 (2023)
- Governing body: Baton Rouge Metropolitan Council
- Constituting instrument: The Plan of Government
- General nature: Local civilian police

Operational structure
- Headquarters: 9000 Airline Hwy. Baton Rouge, LA 70815
- Police Officers: ▼542 of 698 (2026)
- Unsworn members: 267
- Elected officer responsible: Sid Edwards, Mayor-President
- Agency executive: Thomas "TJ" Morse, Jr., Chief of Police
- Divisions: 35: 1st District; 2nd District; 3rd District; 4th District; 5th District; K-9; Motorcycle; Hit & Run; Traffic Homicide; DWI; Special Response Team; Explosives; Dive Team; Mobile Field Force; Violent Crime Apprehension Team; Intelligence; Drone Unit; Real Time Crime Center; Mayor's Security; Financial Crimes; Auto Theft; Burglary; Narcotics; HIDTA; Special Investigation Patrol; Homicide; Major Assaults; Armed Robbery; Special Victims Unit; Missing Persons; NIBIN; Crime Scene; Tech Unit; Victims' Assistance; General Detectives; FBI Task Force; DEA Task Force; ATF Task Force; US Marshals Task Force; Recruiting; Firearms Training Unit; Training Academy
- Bureaus: 4: Uniform Patrol; Criminal Investigations; Operational Services & Special Operations; Administration

Facilities
- Districts: 5

Notables
- Award: CALEA Advanced Accreditation

Website
- https://www.brla.gov/2706/Police-Department

The Baton Rouge Police Department (BRPD) (French: Département de Police de Bâton Rouge) is the primary law enforcement agency in the city of Baton Rouge, Louisiana. Baton Rouge is the second most populous city in Louisiana and is the parish seat of East Baton Rouge Parish which is the most populous parish in the state.

Numerous local law enforcement agencies have jurisdiction that is partially or wholly within the city limits of Baton Rouge. Among them are the East Baton Rouge Parish Sheriff's Office, Baton Rouge City Constable's Office, and Baton Rouge Metropolitan Airport Police. Three universities, Louisiana State University (LSU), Southern University (SU), and Baton Rouge Community College (BRCC), each have campus police departments within the city limits.

== History ==
The first council meeting of Baton Rouge was held on April 13, 1818, during which five officials, referred to as selectmen, were seated. Among them was Pierre Gentin, identified as a police officer. At this meeting, four ordinances were passed, including one that established penalties for "all disorderly and drunken persons." For the time period from July 30, 1818 to May 11, 1819, Pierre Gentin, Charles Everard, and A. York received a salary from the Corporation of the Town of Baton Rouge for their roles as police officers.

Between 1817 and 1859, law enforcement in Baton Rouge was overseen by a town constable, an elected official responsible for maintaining order. The town constable was supported by an assistant and later by the city marshal.

During the Civil War, after Union army forces captured Baton Rouge, local law enforcement was temporarily replaced by a force appointed by James Shedden Palmer, commander of the USS Iroquois. This arrangement remained in place until Louisiana was readmitted to the Union in 1865.

In 1866, E. M. Brooks was appointed Chief of Police by the Baton Rouge City Board of Selectmen, becoming the city's second Chief of Police. The first Chief of Police, Joseph Sanchez, resigned after being appointed an officer in the state penitentiary. The same year, Chief E. M. Brooks designed the first badge to be worn by each officer.

Officers were not provided uniforms and were required to supply their own horses and clothing. Officers were responsible for covering these expenses from their annual salary. By 1879, police officers were paid $500 per year, contingent on their ability to furnish and maintain a horse.

== Training ==
=== Basic Training Academy ===
The Baton Rouge Police Training Services Division was established in 1954 following a proposal from Police Chief E.S. Arrighi to provide standardized instruction for officers. Prior to the division's creation, BRPD officers received training from Louisiana State University (LSU). The department later created its own P.O.S.T. Academy in 1955 to provide agency-specific training and direct hiring.

The academy is a 22-week program that prepares recruits for law enforcement duties. The curriculum includes classroom instruction, scenario-based training, and practical exercises.

=== Training requirements ===
- The Louisiana Peace Officer Standards and Training (POST) Council mandates a minimum of 496 training hours for Level 1 Basic Law Enforcement Peace Officers.
- BRPD provides approximately 880 hours of training during the academy.

=== Training topics ===
Recruits receive instruction in multiple subjects throughout the academy. The following are examples of courses included in training:

- Legal studies – Louisiana criminal law, search and seizure, courtroom procedures
- Patrol operations – Traffic stops, crime prevention, civil disturbance response
- Tactical training – Special Response Team (SWAT) operations, active shooter response, building searches
- Medical training – First aid, CPR, Narcan administration, Tactical Emergency Casualty Care (TECC)
- Defensive tactics – Arrest techniques, use of force, baton handling
- Firearms training – Marksmanship, tactical shooting, weapon retention
- Community policing and de-escalation – Crisis intervention, procedural justice, verbal communication skills

=== Field training program ===
Following graduation from the academy, new officers enter a field training program lasting a minimum of 16 weeks. During this period, they work under the supervision of Field Training Officers (FTOs) and receive on-the-job training in various law enforcement functions.

By the time officers complete field training, they will have spent approximately one year in training from their date of hire before being cleared for full duty.

== Organizational structure ==
=== Rank structure ===
Rank	Insignia
Chief	
Deputy Chief of Police	
Captain	
Lieutenant	
Sergeant	
Corporal	
Police Officer First Class	No Insignia
Police Officer	No Insignia
Trainee	No Insignia

The Chief of Police is appointed by, and reports to, the Mayor-President. The Chief is assisted by four Deputy Chiefs who are appointed by The Chief of Police. All other police positions are promotional and based on seniority, as mandated by state civil service law.

== Lawsuits ==
In 2016, two BRPD officers shot and killed Alton Sterling a 37-year-old black man, while trying to detain him. The killing led to protests and demonstrations in Baton Rouge and elsewhere, leading to the arrests of hundreds of individuals. Due to the violence and arrests that erupted at these protests, local organizing groups and the Louisiana branch of the American Civil Liberties Union filed a lawsuit against the Baton Route Police Department for violating the First Amendment rights of protesting individuals. Less than two weeks after the killing of Alton Sterling, three BRPD officers were shot and killed by Gavin Eugene Long. A fourth officer who was critically wounded in the incident died from complications related to his injuries in 2022.

In April 2023, Baton Rouge paid $55,000 to settle a place brutality lawsuit involving BRPD officer Troy Lawrence, Jr., the son of Deputy Chief Troy Lawrence, Sr. Lawrence Jr. was also involved in two other lawsuits that Baton Rouge settled for $86,000 and $35,000, respectively, with the latter case involving a child who had his underwear searched in public. Lawrence, Jr. later resigned in August 2023.

In February 2024, a federal lawsuit was filed by Lakeisha Varnado and Tredonovan Raby, alleging that the BRPD violated their constitutional rights after BRPD officer Joseph Carboni strip-searched and sexually assaulted their 11-year-old son following a raid on their home in 2023. The family additionally alleged Varnado herself was strip- and body-cavity-searched, and that one of her other children was put into a holding cell and beaten so hard that he was knocked out by BRPD officer Lorenzo Coleman. The incidents are alleged to have taken place at the so-called "BRAVE Cave," an interrogation facility attached to a police substation informally named after the BRPD Street Crimes Unit, and which rose to national attention following separate lawsuits filed by Jeremy Lee and Ternell Brown alleging abuse by BRPD officers at the facility. The FBI subsequently opened a civil rights investigation into the facility, and as of October 2024, 10 separate lawsuits involving the "BRAVE Cave" have been filed.

== See also ==
- List of law enforcement agencies in Louisiana
- International Union of Police Associations
- Officer Down Memorial Page
- Shooting of Alton Sterling
- 2016 shooting of Baton Rouge police officers
