= Black site =

Clandestine detention center

Black sites are clandestine state-operated detention centers where prisoners who have not been charged with a crime are incarcerated without due process or court order, are often mistreated and murdered, and have no recourse to bail.

== Argentina ==
Several clandestine detention centres operated in Argentina during the military dictatorship that ruled the country from 1976 to 1983. Prisoners, many of whom had been "disappeared", were tortured and murdered, including pregnant women who were killed after giving birth, and their babies given to military families.

== China ==
Black sites are widespread within China and a Chinese black site has been alleged to exist in Dubai by a former detainee. Black sites in China are also known as "black jails".

== Egypt ==
Black sites are used extensively by the Egyptian security service. During the Egyptian Crisis (2011–2014), hundreds of protesters alleged that torture occurred at these black sites. The Egyptian security service also operated black sites involved with the CIA's counter-terror black site program.

== Iran ==
Rights groups have claimed abuse in clandestine detention centers in Iran. Sources cited by CNN purport in 2023 that black-site torture appeared to increase during the Mahsa Amini protests.

== Israel ==
A black site in Israel is Camp 1391, noted as the "Israeli Guantanamo".

== Russia ==
In Chechnya, gay men have allegedly been tortured at black sites by the Chechen National Guard. Gay men in other parts of Russia have been kidnapped and transported to sites in Chechnya, where over 100 have been tortured, and some killed. Chechen authorities have thwarted attempts by the Russian LGBT Network to help gay people in Chechnya escape to safe locations in Russia, and inhibited investigations by the Russian Commissioner for Human Rights Tatyana Moskalkova. Despite protests in major Russian cities against the situation in Chechnya, Russian President Vladimir Putin, wanting to maintain good relations with Head of the Chechen Republic Ramzan Kadyrov, has denied that any abuses of homosexuals in Chechnya have occurred. Chechnya is arguably the most homophobic area in Russia, with 95% of its population adhering to Sunni Islam. It remains the only district of Russia where homosexuality is outlawed and punishable with jail time.

== United States ==
CIA-controlled black sites have been used by the U.S. government in its war on terror to detain enemy combatants. U.S. President George W. Bush acknowledged the existence of secret prisons operated by the CIA during a speech on September 6, 2006. A claim that the black sites existed was made by The Washington Post in November 2005 and before this by human rights NGOs.

A European Union (EU) report adopted on February 14, 2007 by a majority of the European Parliament (382 MEPs voting in favor, 256 against and 74 abstaining) stated the CIA operated 1,245 flights and that it was not possible to contradict evidence or suggestions that secret detention centers where prisoners have been tortured were operated in Poland and Romania. After denying the fact for years, Poland confirmed in 2014 that it has hosted black sites.

In January 2012, Poland's Prosecutor General's office initiated investigative proceedings against Zbigniew Siemiątkowski, the former Polish intelligence chief. Siemiątkowski was charged with facilitating the alleged CIA detention operation in Poland, where foreign suspects may have been tortured in the context of the war on terror. The involvement of Leszek Miller, Poland's Prime Minister from 2001 to 2004, is also considered possible.

A 2022 United Press International story cited former Polish President Aleksander Kwaśniewski as admitting in 2014 that his country had provided "a quiet location" for the CIA to operate a black site to torture accused 9/11 terrorists.

== See also ==
- Ain Aouda secret prison
- Enhanced interrogation techniques
- Brave Cave
- Homan Square facility
- LGBTQ rights in Chechnya
- Monopoly on violence
- Political prisoner
- Prisoner of war
- Rendition
- Torture chamber
- United Nations Convention Against Torture
