= Killing of Alton Sterling =

2016 police killing of a black man in Baton Rouge, Louisiana, United States

- Officers and Sterling during altercation
- Date: July 5, 2016
- Time: 12:35 a.m.
- Duration: 90 seconds
- Location: 2112 North Foster Drive, Baton Rouge, Louisiana; 30°28′05″N 91°08′22″W
- Type: Homicide by shooting, police killing
- Filmed by: Bystander's mobile phone and security (CCTV) cameras
- Participants: Howie Lake II, Blane Salamoni (officers)
- Deaths: Alton Sterling
- Charges: None
- Litigation: Lawsuit against city of Baton Rouge, Baton Rouge Police Department and officers settled for $4.5 million

On July 5, 2016, Alton Sterling, a 37-year-old black man, was shot and killed by two Baton Rouge Police Department officers, Blane Salamoni and Howie Lake II, in Baton Rouge, Louisiana, United States. Police were responding to a report that Sterling was selling CDs and that he had used a gun to threaten a man outside a convenience store. They attempted to arrest Sterling which led to a physical struggle on the ground. As the officers were attempting to control Sterling's arms, they shot and killed him. The officers stated that he was reaching for the loaded handgun in his pants pocket. Seconds after the confrontation had started, Salamoni threatened to shoot Sterling, yelling that he would "shoot [Sterling] in the fucking head" if he moved. The owner of the store where the shooting occurred said that Sterling was "not the one causing trouble" during the earlier situation that led to the police being called. The shooting was recorded by multiple bystanders.

The shooting led to protests in Baton Rouge and a request for a civil rights investigation by the U.S. Department of Justice. In May 2017, federal prosecutors decided not to file criminal charges against the police officers involved. In response, Louisiana's attorney general, Jeff Landry, said the state of Louisiana would open an investigation into the shooting once the Department of Justice released the physical evidence. In March 2018, Landry's office announced it would not bring charges against the officers stating that they acted in a "reasonable and justifiable manner".

In February 2021, nearly five years after the shooting, the East Baton Rouge Metro Council approved a $4.5 million settlement for the family of Alton Sterling to settle a wrongful death suit. The family accepted the settlement a few months later and the case was closed.

== Parties involved ==
=== Alton Sterling ===
Alton Sterling (June 14, 1979 – July 5, 2016) was known locally in Baton Rouge as "CD Man". He had a criminal record that included violent offenses and had been sentenced to serve 5 years following a 2009 incident that stated he had resisted arrest. During a struggle with the arresting officer in 2009, according to a Baton Rouge police report, a "black semi auto gun fell from his waistband".

=== Police ===
The police officers involved in the shooting were Howie Lake II and Blane Salamoni. Lake had three years of law enforcement experience; Salamoni had four. Lake was subsequently placed on a department-mandated leave. He was also involved in a previous shooting of an African American male, where the fleeing suspect crashed his car into a house and then began firing at the six officers pursuing him. The police returned fire, injuring the man in the torso. Salamoni and Lake had both been previously investigated and cleared by their department for allegedly having used excessive force.

== Shooting ==
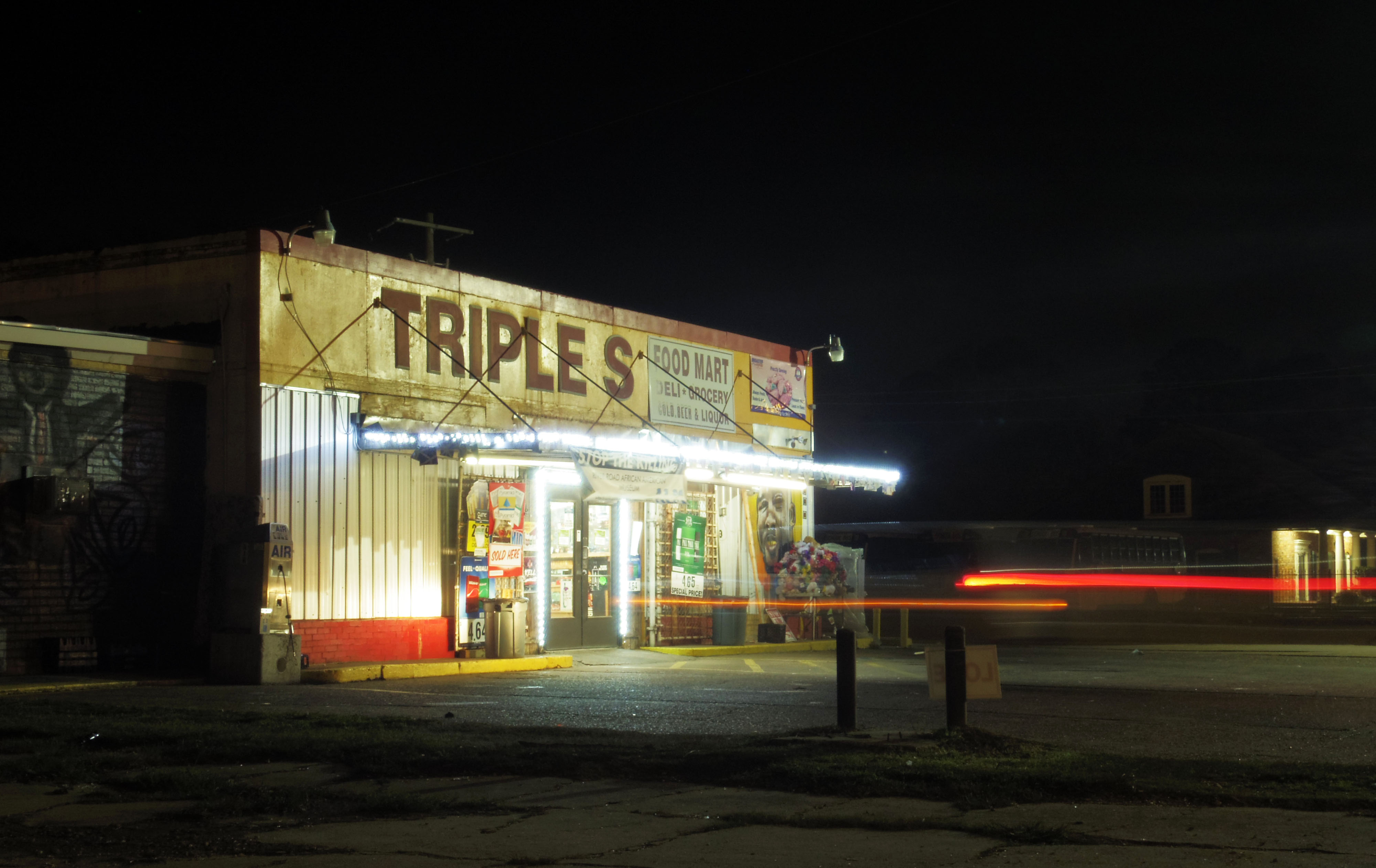
The Triple S Food Market in Baton Rouge, where Sterling was shot by the Baton Rouge Police

At 12:35 a.m., at 2112 North Foster Drive in the parking lot of Triple S Food Mart, Sterling was detained by Baton Rouge Police Department officers Blane Salamoni and Howie Lake. This came after an anonymous caller reported that a man was threatening him and waving a handgun while in the process of selling CDs. When Sterling refused to cooperate, the officers tasered Sterling for resisting several times, then forced Sterling to the hood of a sedan and then to the ground to subdue him. Sterling was pinned to the ground by both officers; one kneeling on his chest and the other on his thigh, both attempting unsuccessfully to control his arms.

As Sterling's right hand remained free, Salamoni exclaimed, "He's going into his pockets! He's got a gun! Gun!" Lake, pointing his gun, yelled, "Hey bro, if you fucking move, I swear to God!" Then Salamoni was heard on the video saying, "Lake, he's going for the gun!" The camera caught Salamoni firing three shots, panning away while three more shots were fired before panning back to show Sterling's body sprawled out. Lake was not in the picture and Salamoni was about 3 feet (0.9 m) away, with his gun drawn and pointed at Sterling, who had a gunshot wound in his chest. Sterling was shot a total of six times all within close range. The officers retrieved a loaded .38 caliber revolver from Sterling's front pants pocket. The officers then radioed for Emergency Medical Services.

According to Parish Coroner William Clark of East Baton Rouge, a preliminary autopsy, on July 5, indicated that Sterling had died from multiple gunshot wounds to his chest and back.

Multiple bystanders' cell phones captured videos of the shooting as well as store surveillance cameras and officer body cameras. One of the bystander's videos was filmed by a group called "Stop the Killing", which listens to police scanners and films crimes in progress. They also listen to police interactions in an effort to reduce violence in the community. A second video was made available the day after the shooting by the store owner and eyewitness, who said in a statement to NBC News, "Sterling never wielded the gun or threatened the officers."

The owner of the store where the shooting occurred said that Sterling had started carrying a gun a few days prior to the event as other CD vendors had been robbed recently. He also said that Sterling was "not the one causing trouble" during the situation that led to the police being called.

In March 2018, the bodycam footage from the officer who shot him was released, revealing that, seconds after arriving to help the other officer already engaged in trying to detain Sterling, he pulled his gun and threatened to "shoot [Sterling] in the fucking head" if he moved.

== Aftermath and reactions ==
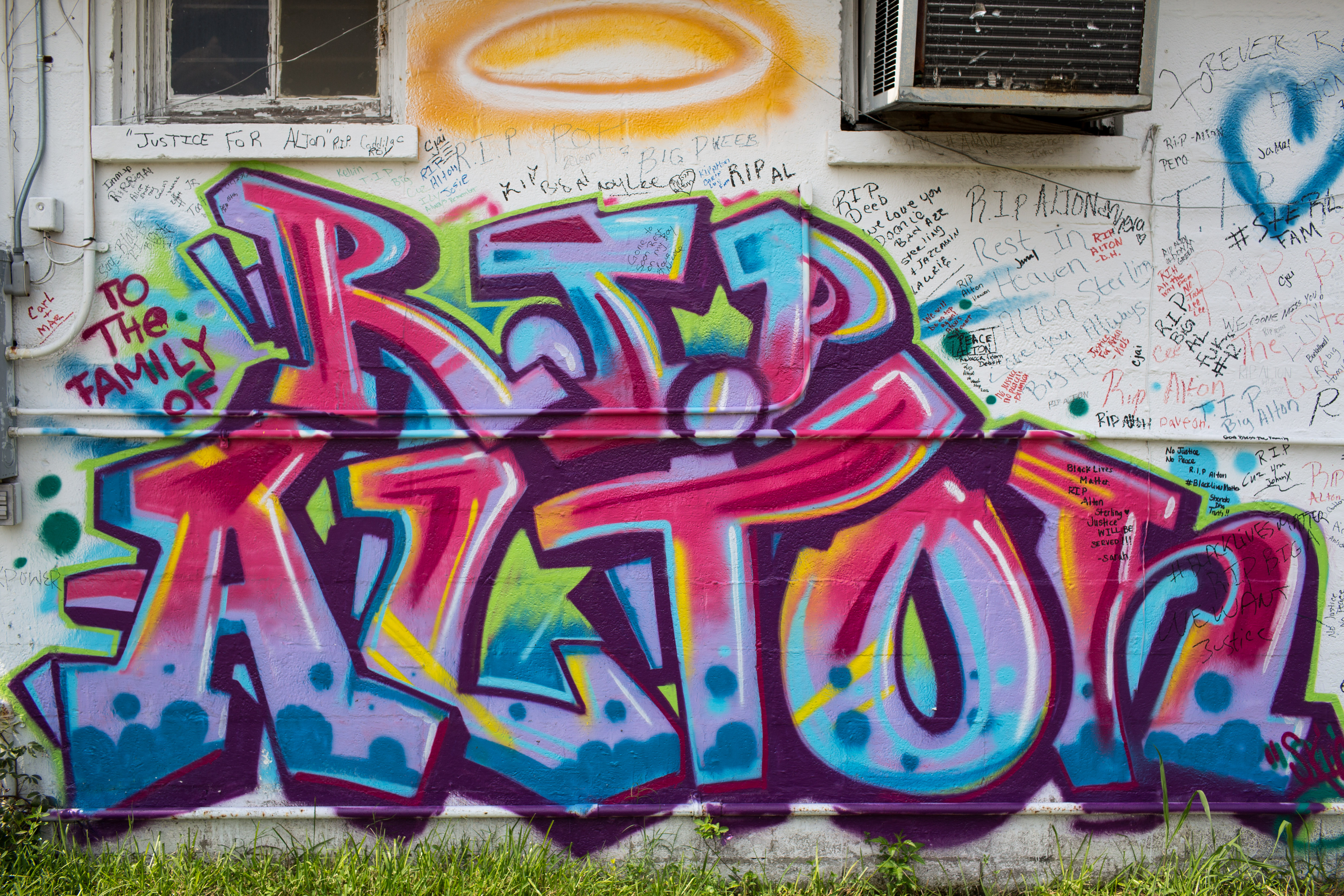
Second memorial for Alton Sterling near the Triple S Food Mart

On the night of July 5, more than 100 demonstrators in Baton Rouge shouted "no justice, no peace", set off fireworks, and blocked an intersection to protest Sterling's death. Flowers and messages were left at the place of his death. The police cleared a crowd of about 200 people as organizers announced they would regroup in front of City Hall.

On July 6, Black Lives Matter held a candlelight vigil in Baton Rouge, with chants of "We love Baton Rouge", and calling for justice.

Speaking shortly after the shootings of Sterling and Philando Castile, President Barack Obama did not comment on the specific incidents. Obama called upon the U.S. to "do better". He also said "Americans should feel outraged at episodes of police brutality since they're rooted in long-simmering racial discord."

On July 7, a protest was held in Dallas, Texas, relating to this shooting of Sterling and Castile on July 6. At the end of the peaceful protest, Micah Xavier Johnson opened fire in an ambush, killing five police officers and wounding eleven others including two civilians. Johnson was then cornered in a defensible location in El Centro College Building B, and hours later, July 8, he was killed by a robot-delivered bomb.

Also, on July 7, the FBI's New Orleans field office issued a warning about "threats to law enforcement and potential threats to the safety of the general public", stemming from the death of Sterling.

Following the shootings of Sterling, Castile, and Dallas police officers, the Bahamian government issued a travel advisory. Bahamian citizens were told to use caution when traveling to the U.S. due to racial tensions. They specifically advised that young men use "extreme caution" when interacting with police, to be non-confrontational and cooperative. Similar advisories were issued by the governments of United Arab Emirates and Bahrain, days later.

On July 8, the United Nations Working Group of Experts on People of African Descent issued a statement strongly condemning Sterling and Castile's killings. Human rights expert Ricardo A. Sunga III, the current Chair of the United Nations panel, stated that the killings demonstrate "a high level of structural and institutional racism". Adding that "The United States is far from recognizing the same rights for all its citizens. Existing measures to address racist crimes motivated by prejudice are insufficient and have failed to stop the killings."

On July 9, a protest in Baton Rouge turned violent, with one police officer having several teeth knocked out and eight firearms (including three rifles, three shotguns, and two pistols) being confiscated. The New Black Panther Party members were also present. Police arrested 102 people.

On July 10, between 30 and 40 people were also arrested.

Professor Peniel E. Joseph, founding director of the Center for the Study of Race and Democracy at Tufts University, said that "the deaths of Alton Sterling and Philando Castile evoke the past spectacle of lynching and that for change to happen, Americans must confront the pain of black history".

On July 11, a home in Baton Rouge was raided in connection with a pawn shop burglary in which seven or eight guns and ammunition were stolen. Three people were arrested during the raid, one of whom said the group was planning on using the stolen firearms to shoot police officers at protests.

On July 13, local organizing groups and the American Civil Liberties Union's Louisiana branch, filed a lawsuit against the Baton Rouge Police Department for violating the First Amendment rights of demonstrators. They claim they were protesting peacefully against Sterling's death.

On July 17, Gavin Eugene Long shot and killed four police officers and wounded two others in Baton Rouge. Long was killed at the scene during a shootout with responding officers. The shooting has been linked to the nationwide tension over race and policing, with the event happening days after Sterling's death in the same city.

== Investigation ==
Louisiana U.S. Representative Cedric Richmond said that the footage of Sterling's shooting is "deeply troubling" and called for a U.S. Department of Justice investigation into the man's death. Governor John Bel Edwards announced on July 6, that the Department of Justice would launch an investigation.

The United States Department of Justice opened a civil rights investigation on July 7, 2016. On May 2, 2017, it was subsequently announced the department would not bring charges against the officers involved.

After the Department of Justice announced that it would not charge the 2 officers, Louisiana attorney general Jeff Landry announced that the state of Louisiana would begin an investigation. In a statement, Landry wrote "The USDOJ’s review of this matter was to determine violations of federal law: specifically, federal civil rights laws. To date, this matter has not been investigated or reviewed for possible violations of the Louisiana Criminal Code. Therefore, this matter now needs to be investigated for possible state criminal violations."

An autopsy report released in March 2018 indicated that Sterling had been shot six times, striking his heart, lung, esophagus and liver. The cause of death was ruled a homicide. The toxicology report showed that at the time of the shooting, Sterling had drugs in his system. Landry said this affected Sterling’s behavior during the deadly encounter. On March 27, Landry's office announced it would not bring charges against the officers stating that they acted in a "reasonable and justifiable manner". On March 30, officer Salamoni was fired for violating use of force policies, and Lake was suspended for three days for losing his temper.

In August 2019, Baton Rouge officials reached a settlement with Blane Salamoni, who appealed his termination. They agreed to overturn his firing and retroactively let him resign without any compensation or back pay.

In February 2021 the East Baton Rouge Metro Council approved a $4.5 million settlement for the family of Alton Sterling to settle a wrongful death suit. The trial of the wrongful death suit was scheduled to begin March 1, 2021. The Council rejected a $5M settlement in November 2020.

== See also ==
- List of killings by law enforcement officers in the United States
- Killing of Walter Scott
- Shooting of Michael Brown
- Killing of Tamir Rice
- Killing of Philando Castile
- Black Lives Matter
