= 2020 shooting of Los Angeles police officers =

2020 shooting of Los Angeles County Sheriff Deputies
- Location: Compton station, Compton, Los Angeles County, California
- Date: September 12, 2020
- Target: Sheriff Deputies
- Attack type: shooting ambush
- Deaths: 0
- Injuries: 2
- Accused: Deonte Lee Murray
- Charges: "willful, deliberate and premeditated attempted murder of a police officer"; "possession of a firearm by a felon"

On September 12, 2020, two deputies of the Los Angeles County Sheriff's Department were shot and critically injured while sitting in their patrol car in an ambush-style attack at Compton station on the Los Angeles Metro Rail system in Compton, California. Police arrested suspect Deonte Lee Murray on September 15, 2020, and prosecutors charged him on September 30, 2020, with attempted murder.

President Donald Trump and then-Democratic presidential nominee Joe Biden denounced the attack on law enforcement.

Murray was sentenced to 166 years imprisonment, in November 2023.
