= Beat (police) =

Area a police officer is assigned to patrol

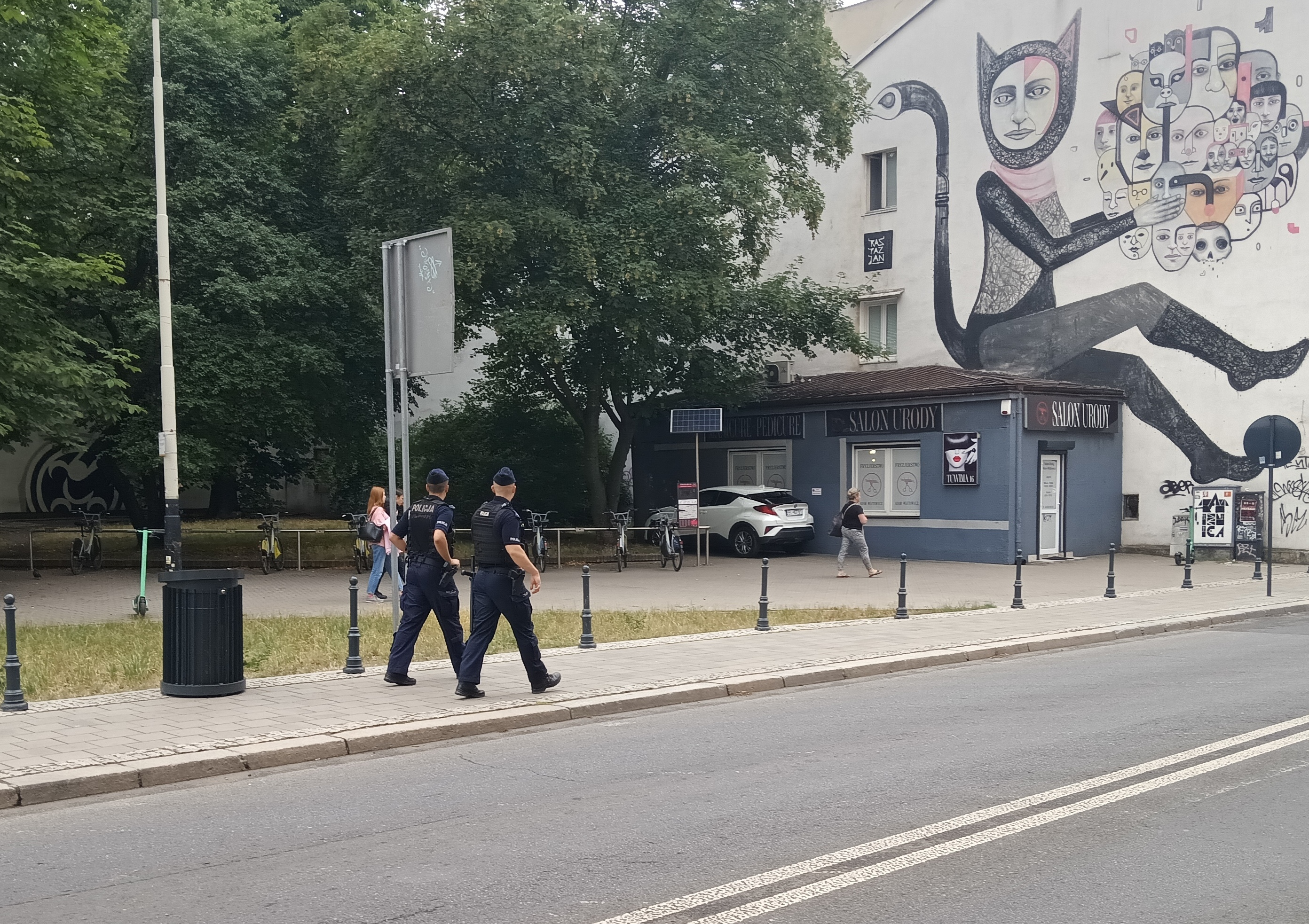
Polish police officers conducting a foot patrol in Łódź

In police terminology, a beat is the territory that a police officer is assigned to patrol. Beats are used to effectively divide available officers across a law enforcement agency's jurisdiction, ensuring organized police presence across a wide area.

"Beat" often refers to specifically foot patrols or bicycle patrols, though "beat" can also be used to simply describe a designated area patrolled by a police officer through any means, such as an officer in a police car or police aircraft. "Police beat" is also used by news media to refer to reports on local crimes and police incidents, often crime reports detailing recent incidents and arrests handled by local law enforcement.

== Overview ==
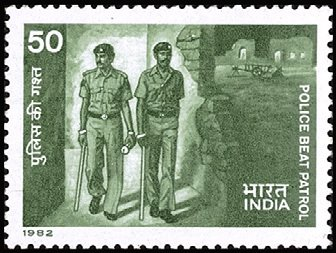
1982 stamp from India depicting the police beat

Beat policing divides available police officers and resources across an agency's jurisdiction, ensuring timely responses to calls for service and effective crime prevention by dispersing police across wide areas. Beat policing promotes close relationships between police and the community within the assigned beat, and uses those relationships to strengthen police effectiveness and encourage cooperative efforts.

Officers are typically assigned beats by their sergeant at roll call or when they are first assigned to the area's police station. Beats are typically taken from the wider jurisdiction of a police station (often called an "area" or a "sector") and may be patrolled by one officer or multiple officers. They are often not given the same beat, to ensure wider connection with the community and deter police corruption. Beats are usually only assigned to patrol officers or low-ranking officers; detectives, specialized units, and high-ranking personnel typically do not patrol and are not assigned to beats, though their assistance may be available for officers within a beat.

Officers are expected to be familiar with their beats and prominent members of the community, and become trusted members of the community that locals can report problems to, even if the officer may not be assigned to the same beat later on. New officers are often shown around beats or introduced to community members by experienced officers or field training officers to ease them in and allow familiarity. Officers are expected to be familiar with vulnerable premises or locations of interest within their beat, such as major businesses and government facilities, landmarks, infrastructure, places to get food, locations of recent crimes, areas frequented by criminals, and nearby emergency service resources. They may also be given descriptions or images of wanted items, vehicles, or criminals to look out for, typically by examining the rogues' gallery or during the roll call.

What officers are expected to do within their beat depends on their agency's policies. They may simply be tasked with being nearby or establishing police presence, and thus may spend their shift on standby in their area or guarding a certain location; in other instances, officers may be sent to monitor certain locations, or they may be required to check in with supervisors or dispatch along a certain route or schedule to ensure they are active. Failure to check in may result in another officer being sent to check on the unresponsive officer's safety, or disciplinary action. It may also result in job termination or reassignment if the officer is consistently unresponsive or ignores an important call within their beat.

Officers may be permitted to respond to calls outside their beat, especially urgent emergencies or backup requests, but they are expected to return to their beat as soon as possible. Beats may be expanded to cover for other officers responding to incidents outside their beats.

== History ==
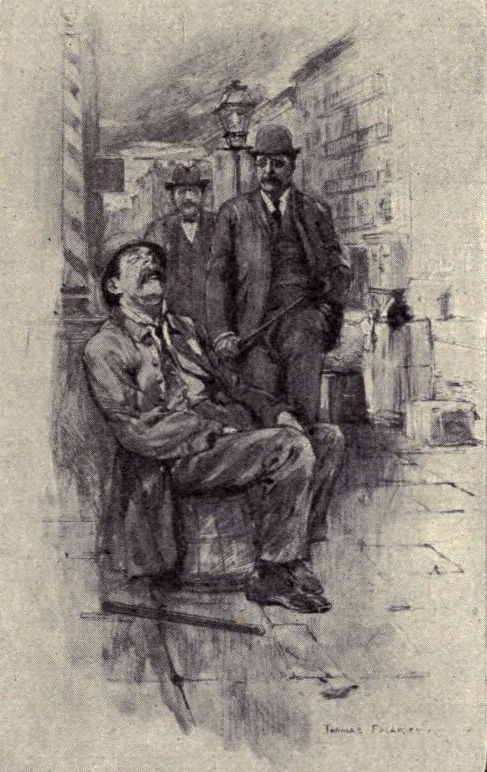
Future President of the United States Theodore Roosevelt patrolling a beat when he was Commissioner of the NYPD in 1894. Roosevelt would walk along his officers' beats to ensure they were on duty. In this illustration, Roosevelt, alongside journalist Jacob Riis, comes across a police officer sleeping while on duty.

Before the advent of police radio, beats were organized by watchmen and constables in towns and cities to cover specific areas, usually shown on a map in the police station and given some sort of name or number. Officers would be assigned a beat by their sergeant and sometimes given a card indicating that the officer should be at a particular point at set times, usually 30 to 45 minutes apart. The points would usually be telephone booths, call boxes, police boxes, sentry boxes, or public houses, where it would be possible to phone the officer should he be needed to respond to an incident. The officer would remain at the point for a set amount of time, typically five minutes, and then patrol the area, gradually making his way to the next point.

Sometime during an officer's shift, he could expect a supervisory officer to meet him at one of the points. This ensured the beat patrol was being correctly carried out and was an opportunity to discuss problems. The supervisor would sign the officer or constable's pocket book, ensuring that it was up to date. Missing a point or a supervisor meeting often resulted in disciplinary action. Officers typically had many limitations on what they could do on their beat and were dissuaded from forming close bonds with their community. In the United Kingdom, police constables were not allowed to converse with passerby or pass the time with other constables unless it was necessary to perform their duties.

The same principles extended to beats patrolled on bicycles or in motor vehicles. Even with radio communication, the patrol vehicle would be expected to visit and remain at certain points at particular times, allowing supervisors to meet up with the patrolling officer or to give a visible police presence at times when this was deemed particularly needed.

Chief Constable Captain Athelstan Popkess of the Nottingham City Police is credited with being largely responsible for transforming British police from their Victorian era beat policing model to the modern reactive response model, through his development of the Mechanized Division, which used two-way radio communication between police command and patrol cars. Popkess and the Nottingham City Police would expand the reactive response model, including overlaying mobile patrol areas on top of several existing foot beats; allowing responding Mechanized Division officers to collect colleagues on foot and take them to incidents; "snatch-plans" to pot up police cars at key road junctions in the event of serious crimes; and the use of unmarked vehicles. Around the same period, police in other countries such as the United States also began to reorganize their traditional beat systems to use advances in policing technology.

== Modern policing ==
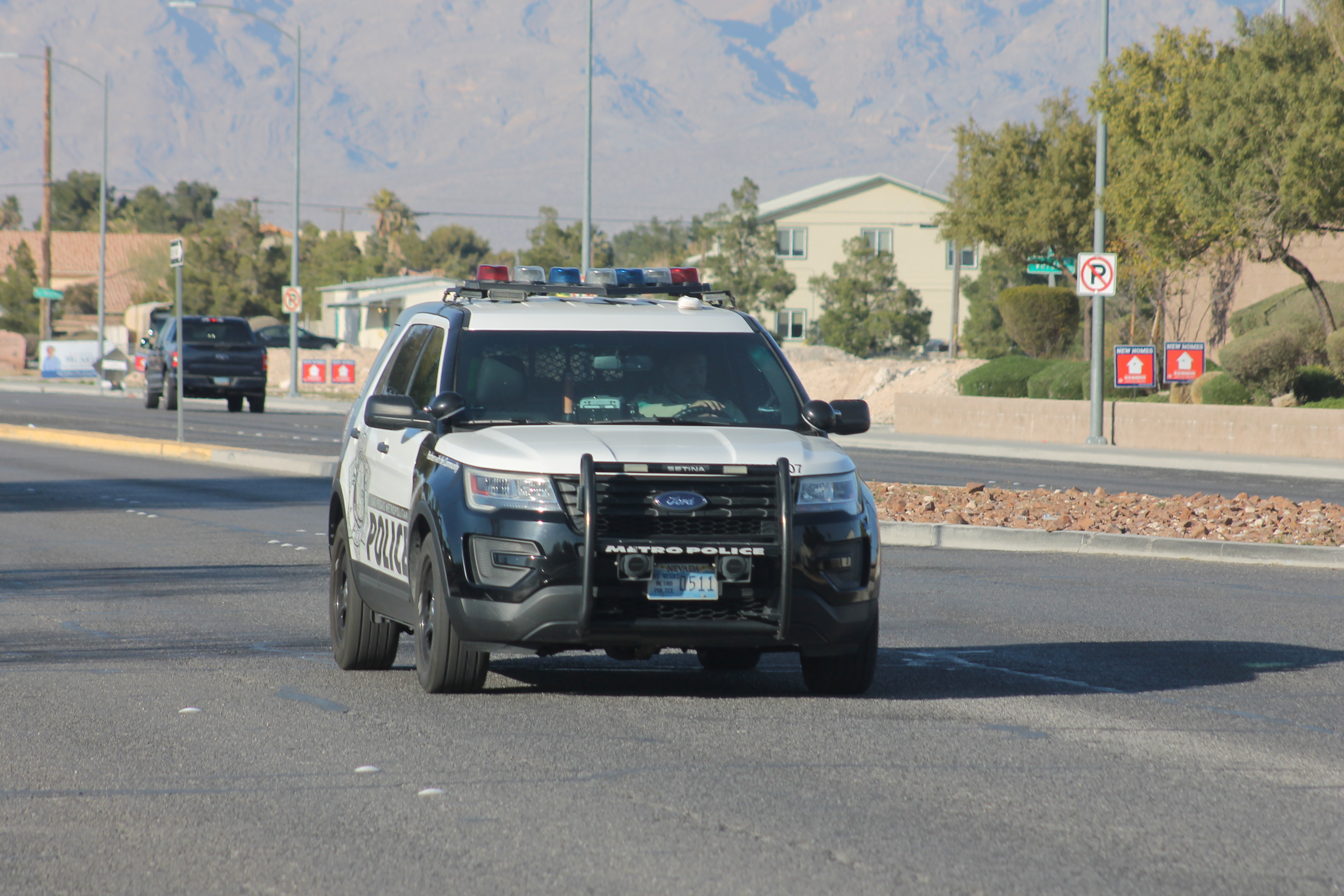
A Las Vegas Metropolitan Police Department cruiser, assigned to the department's Northwest Area command, patrolling a section of northern Las Vegas. Using vehicles, officers' beats are able to cover wider areas than traditional foot patrols.

The move to motorized patrols in the mid-20th century greatly reduced the priority given to foot patrols. The proliferation of technology such as portable radios and mobile data terminals among the standard-issue equipment of police officers, the growth and expanse of cities and residential areas, and changes in interactions between police and the community (such as increased traffic stops due to higher automobile ownership), greatly reduced the need for foot patrols and the traditional beat system. Additionally, concerns over corruption between criminals and their local patrol officer led to a de-emphasis in close community bonds. For the most part, beats simply became areas police officers were assigned to, regardless of their familiarity with the community or the area, and the size of beats increased as more police forces began using vehicles.

In the 21st century, traditional beat policing returned to modern policing as a new focus on community policing emerged, resulting in a resurgence in traditional foot patrols.

== See also ==
- Community policing – Strategy of public safety administration
- Peelian principles – Philosophy defining ethical police force
- Proactive policing – Police presence for crime deterrence
- Preventive police – Aspect of law enforcement
- Beat reporting – In-depth journalism on an issue or topic
- Victimology – Study of victimization
