= 2009 Washington shootings =

2009 Washington shootings may refer to:

- The murder of Timothy Brenton, October 31, 2009
- The 2009 shooting of Lakewood, Washington, police officers, November 29, 2009
