= Pittsburgh Law Enforcement Memorial =

Coordinates: 40°26′42″N 80°00′49″W

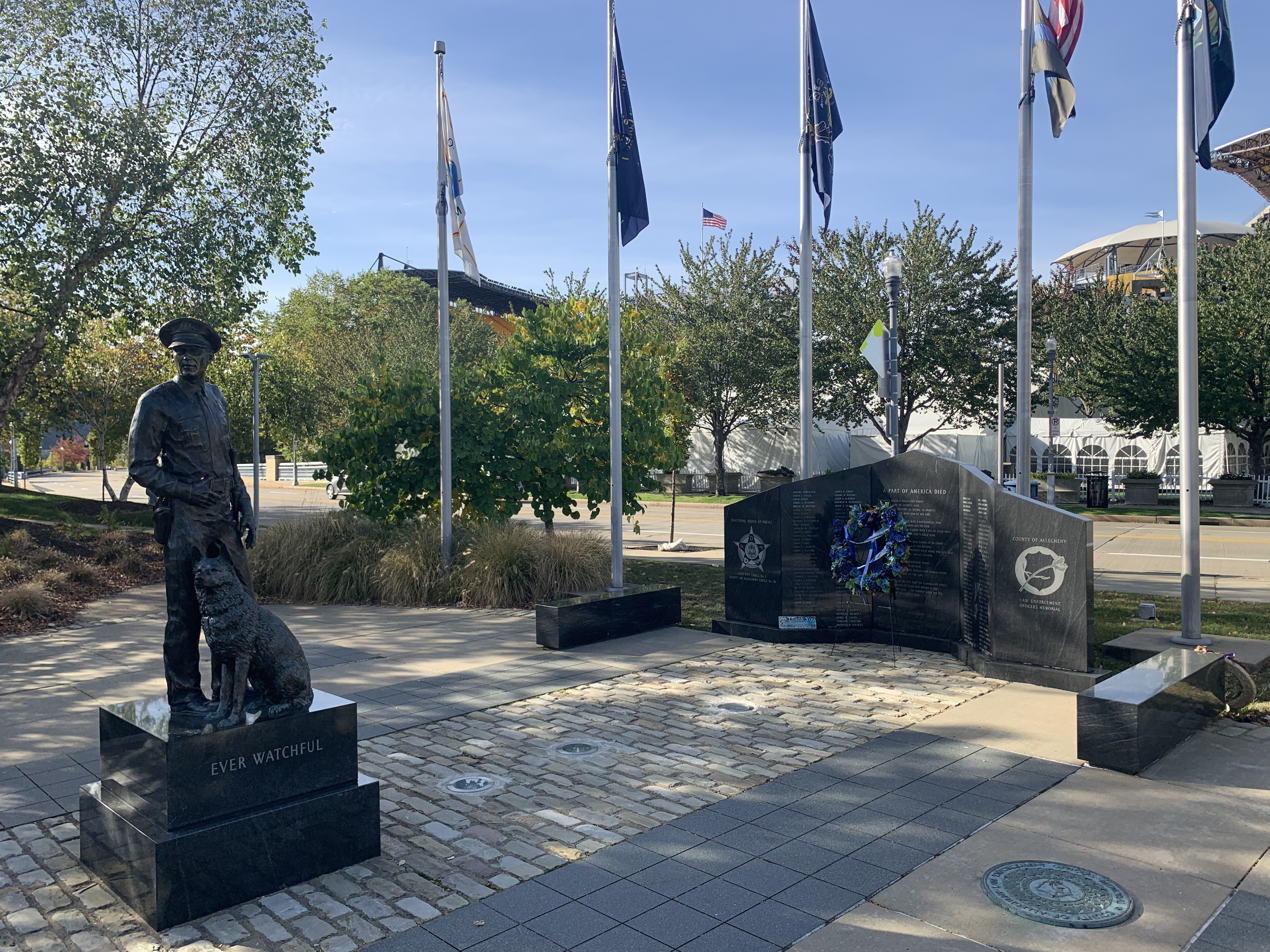
The memorial in October 2020

The Law Enforcement Officers Memorial of Allegheny County is a monument to Allegheny County, Pennsylvania's law enforcement community in honor of fallen officers of both the Pittsburgh Police and suburban departments. The original was dedicated in September 1996 near the Kamin Science Center but was moved with the construction of Heinz Field and rededicated in May 2003.

== Fallen officers ==
The officers honored from the Pittsburgh & Allegheny County agencies are:

=== 2010s ===
- (Port Authority of Allegheny County) K9 Aren, Thursday, January 31, 2016, Stabbed
- K9 Rocco, Thursday, January 30, 2014, Stabbed

=== 2000s ===
- (Penn Hills) Police Officer Michael James Crawshaw, Sunday, December 6, 2009, Gunfire
- Ofc. Paul John Rizzo Domenic Sciullo, II Saturday, April 4, 2009, Gunfire
- Ofc. Eric Guy Kelly, Saturday, April 4, 2009, Gunfire
- Ofc. Stephen James Mayhle, Saturday, April 4, 2009, Gunfire
- K9 Ulf, Tuesday, May 6, 2008, Gunfire
- State Corporal Joseph Raymond Pokorny, Jr., Monday, December 12, 2005, Gunfire
- State Trooper Tod C. Kelly, Wednesday, November 7, 2001, Vehicle

=== 1990s ===
- Sgt. James Henry Taylor, Jr., Friday, September 22, 1995, Gunfire
- (McKeesport) Police Officer Frank A. Miller, Jr., Wednesday, November 10, 1993, Gunfire
- K9 Jupp, Friday, June 21, 1991, Vehicle
- Ofc. Joseph J. Grill, Wednesday, March 6, 1991, Vehicle
- Ofc. Thomas L. Herron, Wednesday, March 6, 1991, Vehicle
- (Hampton) Police Officer Ralph Henry Mock, Jr., Monday, January 28, 1991, Vehicle
- Sgt. James T. Blair, Monday, November 26, 1990, Motorcycle

=== 1980s ===
- (Bethel Park) Detective Lynn Russell Sutter, Saturday, March 28, 1987, Gunfire
- State Trooper Clinton Wayne Crawford, Monday, August 17, 1987, Vehicle
- (Penn Hills) K9 Joker, Monday, February 2, 1987, Stabbed
- (Sheriff) Sgt. James Robert Milcarek, Sr., Friday, November 18, 1983, Vehicle
- Dpty. Sheriff Edward M. Butko, Jr., September 29, 1983, Vehicle
- Det. Norman A. Stewart, Friday, September 16, 1983, Gunfire
- Patrolmen David A. Barr, Tuesday, May 3, 1983, Gunfire

=== 1970s ===
- County Patrolman Thomas A. Daley, Friday, March 26, 1976, Animal
- K9 Fritz, Monday, April 28, 1975, Fall
- (Bell Acres) Patrolman John Sherba, Thursday, March 13, 1975, Vehicle
- Police Officer Patrick J. Wallace, Jr., Wednesday, July 3, 1974, Gunfire
- (Corrections) Captain Walter L. Peterson, Monday, December 10, 1973, Assault
- (McCandless) Patrolman Albert William Devlin, Monday, January 8, 1973, Vehicle
- (Whitaker) Patrolman Frederick Lippert, Thursday, October 5, 1972, Vehicle
- (Robinson) Lt. William B. Mays, Thursday, June 29, 1972, Heart attack
- (Penn Hills)Patrol Officer Bartley J. Connolly, Jr., Saturday, March 25, 1972, Gunfire
- (Penn Hills) Sergeant William Edward Schrott, Saturday, March 25, 1972, Gunfire
- Patrolman William J. Otis, Wednesday, March 3, 1971, Gunfire
- Patrolman John Leslie Scott, Wednesday, October 14, 1970, Gunfire

=== 1960s ===
- (Verona) Police Officer Joseph Paul Zanella, Friday, September 19, 1969, Gunfire
- (Monroeville) Sergeant Andrew Robert Rusbarsky), Tuesday, October 29, 1968, Vehicle
- Patrolman James Edward Graff, Friday, February 23, 1968, Heart attack
- (Verona) Lt. Joseph Rafay, Jr., Thursday, January 19, 1967, Heart attack
- Patrolman Joseph Francis Gaetano, Friday, June 10, 1966, Gunfire
- (Corrections) Correctional Officer Clifford J. Grogan, Friday, November 12, 1965, Stabbed
- Patrolman Coleman Regis McDonough, Monday, July 5, 1965, Gunfire
- (Homestead) Patrolman Joseph G. Lecak, Thursday, October 26, 1961, Vehicle

=== 1950s ===
- (Northumberland) Sheriff James R. Lauer, Wednesday, May 27, 1959, Gunfire
- Patrolman James V. Timpona, Thursday, October 16, 1958, Streetcar
- State Trooper Edward Mackiw, Saturday, May 31, 1958, Vehicle
- (Scott) Captain Edward J. Hilker, Sunday, September 16, 1956, Heart attack
- Det. James R. Kelly, Friday, June 3, 1955, Heart attack
- County Patrolman John W. Timmons, Saturday, March 19, 1955, Vehicle
- Patrolman John G. Gillespie, Tuesdasy, January 25, 1955, Vehicle
- (Fawn) Chief of Police Lloyd J. Hine, Monday, August 30, 1954, Vehicle
- Patrolman William H. Heagy, Thursday, March 25, 1954, Gunfire
- (Verona) Police Officer Charles McKinley, Thursday, February 4, 1954, Gunfire
- Patrolman Edward V. Tierney, Jr., Tuesday, July 28, 1953, Motorcycle
- Patrolman William R. Ewing, Saturday, February 7, 1953, Motorcycle

=== 1940s ===
- (Bethel Park) Patrolman Joseph Chmelynski, Tuesday, March 9, 1948, Gunfire
- (Braddock) Patrolman Benjamin Harrison Manson, Sunday, October 5, 1947, Train
- Lt. William J. "Jack" Lavery, Tuesday, August 5, 1947, Electrocuted
- Patrolman Louis G. Spencer, Tuesday, December 24, 1946, Gunfire
- Patrolman Arthur A. MacDonald, Friday, March 16, 1945, Heart attack
- County Det. Albert T. Lorch, Friday, October 1, 1943, Gunfire
- Patrolman Toby J. Brown, Saturday, August 23, 1941, Gunfire

=== 1930s ===
- Patrolman Edward M. Conway, Tuesday, June 27, 1939, Gunfire
- (West Homestead) Captain Edward A. O'Donnell, Monday, May 2, 1938, Motorcycle
- Patrolman John J. Scanlon, Saturday, August 21, 1937, Automobile
- (Pittsburgh Railways) Patrolman George Washington Huff, Wednesday, March 3, 1937, Vehicle
- Patrolman George A. Kelly, Friday, February 12, 1937, Vehicle
- Patrolman Charles M. Snyder, Monday, January 25, 1937, Drowned
- Inspector Albert L. Jacks, Friday, April 17, 1936, Illness
- (McKeesport) Patrolman John H. Sellman, Wednesday, March 18, 1936, Drowned
- Patrolman Robert L. Kosmal, Saturday, August 17, 1935, Gunfire
- Patrolman Roy W. Freiss, Sunday, February 3, 1935, Vehicle
- Patrolman George J. Sallade, Thursday, October 5, 1933, Vehicle
- State Patrolman Herbert P. Brantlinger, Sunday, September 3, 1933, Gunfire
- (Bellevue) Chief of Police Daniel V. Rosemeier, Friday, July 6, 1934, Heart attack
- (Brentwood) Police Officer Emil Carl Kehr, Tuesday, December 6, 1932, Motorcycle
- (McKeesport) Patrolman Charles Bartlett, Sunday, November 20, 1932, Heart attack
- (Ross) Chief of Police Vernon Porter Moses, Tuesday, May 3, 1932, Gunfire
- (Munhall) Police Officer Frank E. Moore, Sunday, January 17, 1932, Motorcycle
- (Cheswick) Patrolman John Polcsak, Wednesday, August 26, 1931, Vehicle
- (Ingram) Police Officer Louis Edward Wagner, Sunday, July 5, 1931, Motorcycle
- (Braddock) Patrolman John F. Podowski, Sunday, April 5, 1931, Vehicle
- Patrolman Joseph J. Beran, Wednesday, January 28, 1931, Vehicle
- (McKees Rocks) Patrolman Grover Wolf, Friday, November 14, 1930, Gunfire
- (West Elizabeth) Patrolman Clarence A. Jones, Monday, October 27, 1930, Motorcycle
- Patrolman Anthony E. Rahe, Thursday, August 7, 1930, Motorcycle
- Patrolman Orrie N. Murray, Wednesday, June 25, 1930, Motorcycle

=== 1920s ===
- Patrolman James E. Hughes, Friday, December 27, 1929, Gunfire
- Patrolman Silas T. Yimin, Thursday, November 28, 1929, Illness
- Patrolman Stephen Janeda, Monday, July 15, 1929, Motorcycle
- Patrolman John Joseph Schemm, Friday, December 21, 1928, Fall
- (Edgewood) Chief of Police John L. Nye, Monday, November 5, 1928, Motorcycle
- Patrolman Ralph P. Gentile, Thursday, November 1, 1928, Motorcycle
- (Braddock) Patrolman Andrew Katnik, Thursday, December 29, 1927, Gunfire
- (Homestead) Captain Patrick J. Mullen, Thursday, November 10, 1927, Accidental
- Patrolman William P. Johnson, Sunday, October 23, 1927, Gunfire
- (West View) Chief William A. Quigley, Tuesday, September 27, 1927, Vehicle
- State Private John T. Downey, Monday, August 22, 1927, Gunfire
- Patrolman James F. Farrell, Wednesday, July 6, 1927, Gunfire
- (Rankin) Sergeant George L. MacPhee, Friday, April 9, 1926, Gunfire
- Patrolman Charles Lewis Cooper, Jr., Tuesday, August 18, 1925, Gunfire
- Lt. Albert Bert Burris, Tuesday, June 30, 1925, Heart attack
- (Braddock) Patrolman Charles W. Hanson, Thursday, April 9, 1925, Motorcycle
- Patrolman Samuel R. McGreevy, Thursday, October 9, 1924, Vehicle
- Lt. Robert J. Galloway, Tuesday, August 26, 1924, Gunfire
- Patrolman Joseph L. Riley, Sunday, August 3, 1924, Vehicle
- Deputy Sheriff Meyer Van Lewen, Saturday, July 19, 1924, Gunfire
- Patrolman Joseph Jovanovic, Monday, July 7, 1924, Gunfire
- (Stowe) Patrolman Harry Homer, Monday, June 15, 1924, Motorcycle
- (McKeesport) Patrolman Max Lefkowitz, Wednesday, May 14, 1924, Gunfire
- (Corrections) Deputy Warden John A. Pieper, Monday, February 11, 1924, Gunfire
- (Corrections) Corrections Officer John T. Coax, Monday, February 11, 1924, Gunfire
- Patrolman John Joseph Rudolph, Tuesday, April 3, 1923, Motorcycle
- Sgt. Casper Thomas Schmotzer, Tuesday, January 23, 1923, Gunfire
- Patrolman Daniel John Conley, Saturday, December 30, 1923, Gunfire
- Patrolman Edward George Couch, Monday, October 30, 1922, Gunfire
- (Neville) Chief of Police Arthur Stanley Phillips, Thursday, July 27, 1922, Motorcycle
- (McKeesport) Patrolman Charles F. Paist, Sunday, May 14, 1922, Motorcycle
- (Dormont) Police Officer Joseph A. Coghill, Sunday, December 25, 1921
- (Etna) Police Officer James F. Lewis, Monday, May 9, 1921, Vehicle
- Patrolman William J. Johnston, Monday, May 2, 1921, Streetcar
- Detective Peter K. Tsorvas, Tuesday, November 2, 1920, Gunfire
- (Homestead) Patrolman William Frank Smith, Wednesday, October 6, 1920, Gunfire

=== 1910s ===
- (Munhall) Patrolman Ignatius T. Brown, Friday, September 12, 1919, Vehicle
- (Crafton) Patrolman Louis H. Hufnagel, Monday, September 8, 1919, Gunfire
- (Turtle Creek) Police Officer Robert McLean Hamilton, Friday, April 4, 1919, Gunfire
- (McKees Rocks) Patrolman James Joseph Hanley, Tuesday, March 11, 1919, Vehicle
- (Homestead) Patrolman John L. Wilson, Sunday, September 8, 1918, Gunfire
- Patrolman Thomas Patrick Farrell, Saturday, March 2, 1918, Gunfire
- (Harrison) Chief of Police Harry Meyers, Sunday, January 6, 1918, Gunfire
- (Harrison) Officer William C. Lucas, Sr., Sunday, December 23, 1917, Gunfire
- (Munhall) Patrolman Michael J. Lebedda, Saturday, November 17, 1917, Gunfire
- Patrolman Edgar M. Hyland, Saturday, May 26, 1917, Assault
- Patrolman Charles R. Edinger, Wednesday, June 6, 1917, Gunfire
- (McKeesport) Patrolman Anthony Hlavaty, Wednesday, May 16, 1917, Motorcycle
- (McKeesport) Patrolman John E. Clifford, Wednesday, December 15, 1915, Vehicle
- (Duquesne) Patrolman John Flynn, Thursday, October 7, 1915, Gunfire
- Patrolman George H. Shearer, Tuesday, May 12, 1914, Gunfire
- Patrolman Michael Grab, Tuesday, March 3, 1914, Streetcar
- Police Officer John J. McDonough, Monday, September 29, 1913, Assault
- Deputy Sheriff J. Davis, Tuesday, January 28, 1913, Stabbed

=== 1900s ===
- Police Officer William Walsh, Wednesday, October 20, 1909, Drowned
- State Private John Curtis "Jack" Smith, Monday, August 23, 1909, Gunfire
- Deputy Sheriff Harry H. Exley, Sunday, August 22, 1909, Gunfire
- State Private John L. Williams, Sunday, August 22, 1909, Gunfire
- Police Officer James Farrell, Saturday, October 23, 1908, Gunfire
- (Wilkinsburg) Chief of Police Daniel E. Doncaster, Saturday, March 14, 1908, Illness
- (Coraopolis) Patrolman Bruce A. Patton, Sunday, December 10, 1905, Gunfire
- Wagonman George M. Cochran, Sunday, November 13, 1904, Vehicle
- Police Officer Casper Mayer, Friday, April 1, 1904, Electrocuted
- Police Officer Andrew J. Kelly, Sunday, October 4, 1903, Gunfire
- (Wilkinsburg) Chief of Police George W. Snyder, Sunday, May 17, 1903, Heart attack
- Patrolman John Graham Kelty, Sunday, January 11, 1903, Streetcar
- Police Officer James H. Sheehy, Sunday, May 18, 1902, Gunfire
- Det. Patrick Edward Fitzgerald, Friday, April 12, 1901, Gunfire
- Police Officer David W. Lewis, Tuesday, August 7, 1900, Assault

=== 1890s ===
- Police Officer William Scanlon, Friday, July 8, 1898, Assault
- Police Officer Charles Metzgar, Wednesday, May 11, 1898, Gunfire
- Lieutenant John Alexander Berry, Wednesday, February 9, 1898, Fire
- (Erie County Department of Corrections) Warden Thomas E. McCrea, Thursday, November 19, 1896, Assault
- Police Officer Patrick F. Doyle, Thursday, August 8, 1895, Heart attack
- (Allegheny City) Police Officer Peter Dillon, Thursday, September 20, 1894, Electrocuted
- (McDonald) Constable Hugh Coyle, Saturday, August 6, 1892, Gunfire

=== 1880s ===
- Police Officer Thomas Chidlow, Thursday, May 24, 1888, Train
- Police Officer George C. Woods, Monday, September 6, 1886, Fall
- Police Officer John F. "Benjamin" Evans, Thursday, August 6, 1885, Gunfire
- Police Officer Edward O'Dwyer, Tuesday, July 5, 1881, Stabbed
- (Allegheny City) Police Officer John Wiggins, Tuesday, November 9, 1880, Gunfire

=== 1870s ===
- Police Officer Thomas Lyons, Tuesday, July 16, 1878, Assault
- Police Officer John Weimar, Monday, August 24, 1874, Gunfire
- Police Officer Isaac Jones, Saturday, September 23, 1871, Assault

=== 1860s ===
- Police Officer Daniel McMullen, Saturday, December 18, 1869, Assault

=== 1850s ===
- Night Watchman Samuel Ferguson, Thursday, April 21, 1853, Stabbed
