= St Ann's riots =

1958 race riots in Nottingham, England

The 1958 St Ann's riots, also known as the Nottingham riots or the Nottingham race riots, was a racially motivated riot from the 23 August 1958 to 6th September in the suburb of St Ann's in Nottingham. Racism after post-war immigration from the Caribbean led to racial tensions, which exploded into clashes in the summer of 1958. Several men and women were injured, and one man needed 37 stitches after a throat wound. The riots led to discussions between Caribbean countries and the UK government, which were intensified a week later by the Notting Hill riots in London.

Capt. Athelstan Popkess, Nottingham City Police's Chief Constable at the time, downplayed the events afterwards and claimed that they were not racially motivated.

== Contextual background ==
Afro-Caribbean immigration had been increasing in numbers since 1955. St Ann's was around 10% non-White in 1958 at the time of the riots.

== Event ==
=== 23rd of August ===
The race riot started on the 23rd of August 1958. A fight, the exact cause of which is unknown and has been debated, between a White and Afro-Caribbean man took place outside a public house. The violence spread within a couple of minutes in which a number of White men were stabbed by Afro-Caribbeans and to which then around 1,500 people gathered in a hostile crowd. Within 90 minutes of the riot starting the police had restored order.

=== 30th of August ===
The following week a larger crowd of around 4,000 gathered due to the events of last week.

=== 6th of September ===
A smaller crowd gathered the next week. A battle between Afro-Caribbean tenants in the upper floors of a house and Whites on the ground occurred. In total, 4,500 people had participated in the disturbances to some extent.
