= Police radio =

Radio communication systems used by police

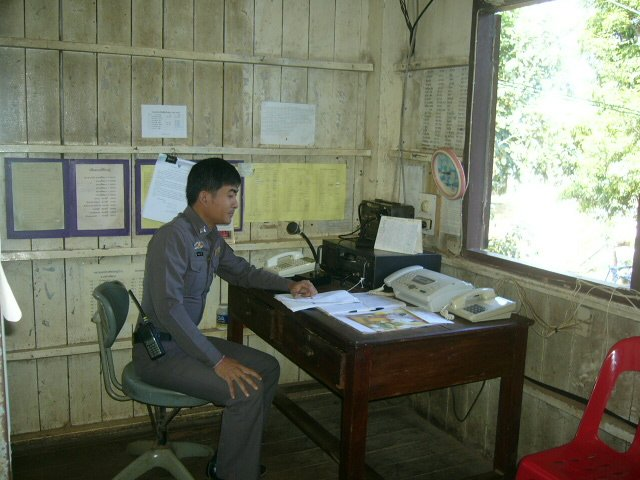
Royal Thai Police radio operator in 2004

Police radio is a radio system used by police and other law enforcement agencies to communicate with one another. Police radio systems almost always use two-way radio systems to allow for communications between police officers and dispatchers.

Since the 2000s, only digital networks from various manufacturers and based on different standards have been introduced; however, analog networks remain in operation worldwide.

== History ==
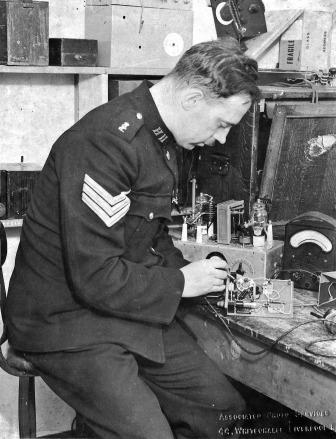
Liverpool City Police radio operator

Before police radio systems were first implemented, police officers assigned to their beat could only communicate with police command using telephone booths, call boxes, police boxes, or physical meetings. Calling for help or signaling other officers could only be done by shouting, using a whistle, or hitting things to make sounds. This meant that properly calling for assistance, reporting an incident or arrest, being dispatched to handle a crime, or requesting police resources was only possible if the officer reached a telephone or call box.

The first police radio system was implemented by the Detroit Police Department. On March 18, 1922 it was licensed to operate a station with the call sign KOP, which was used as a one-way radio system to broadcast crime information to police cars. KOP was technically an "entertainment station"; to fulfill this, KOP was made publicly accessible, and music was broadcast between descriptions of stolen vehicles and crime reports. KOP was discontinued in late 1925. Later in 1922, station WLAW was licensed to the Police Department of New York City. WLAW was discontinued in the fall of 1924. It proved impractical for police radio stations to share frequencies with standard broadcasting stations. Eventually the police stations were assigned their own frequencies, and it became common practice for 1930s receivers to designate the frequencies above 1500 kHz as the "Police Band".

The first two-way police radio system was implemented by the Bayonne, New Jersey police in 1933. The FCC briefly prohibited police radio communications in 1934, but rescinded their decision in 1935.

Due to their cost and size, early police radio systems were only used in police cars and buildings; officers on foot patrol still had to rely on telephones and call boxes. Portable radios introduced in the 1960s made radio communications widely accessible to all officers. Early portable radios were heavy and had short battery life, an issue that gradually disappeared as technology advanced.

Modern police radio systems are often augmented by mobile data terminals to effectively manage units and assignments.

Police radio systems historically used public radio frequencies, and listening to them was, for the most part, legal. Most modern police radio systems switched to encrypted radio systems in the 1990s and 2000s to prevent eavesdroppers from listening in.

== By country ==
=== Asia/Oceania ===
==== Australia ====
Due to the country’s federal structure, there is no unified, national police radio network. Instead, each state and territory operates its own Government Radio Network (GRN). In terms of technology, Australia’s security infrastructure is highly modernized, digitized, and comprehensively protected against eavesdropping. The primary system used is Project 25 (P25).

==== PR China ====
In the People's Republic of China, radio infrastructure, like everything else, is strictly standardized and government-controlled. All technologies have been developed entirely domestically. The technological backbone consists of a proprietary digital radio standard, combined with modern broadband and satellite technology, known as PDT (Professional/Police Digital Trunking).

PDT is the official, legally mandated digital radio standard for public safety in China. It was developed by the Ministry of Public Security (MPS). The entire Chinese police force (Public Security Bureau), specialized units such as the Police Tactical Unit (PTU), and transport authorities utilize this system, which operates within the 350 MHz frequency band.

==== India ====
Since the 2020s, police, security, and government radio communications in India have been undergoing a profound technological transformation. Because the Indian Constitution places primary responsibility for internal security with the individual states, the radio landscape is extremely fragmented—ranging from state-of-the-art, digitally encrypted networks in megacities to outdated, unencrypted analog systems in rural regions.

The digital standard for urban areas are mostly TETRA and APCO P25. Given the vast size of India’s national territory and the fact that many regions are topographically difficult to access, the Ministry of Home Affairs operates a national, satellite-based network called POLNET (Police Network).

Outside of major urban centers, radio communications remain heavily reliant on older technologies; many police stations and patrol cars communicate via conventional analog radio in the VHF band, frequently within the 136–174 MHz range.

==== Iran ====
In the Islamic Republic of Iran, the police security radio network managed by the national police command, FARAJA is highly fragmented. The regular police, the traffic police, and, in particular, the religious militia (Basij) rely heavily on analog radio for their day-to-day operations, utilizing neither frequency hopping nor encryption. Some units in urban areas like Theran and some specialized units are using the Europan TETRA system. because of sanctions they could only use the weak TEA1-standard and not TEA2.

==== Pakistan ====
The technical structure varies by region, province, and intended use, with European and increasingly Chinese standards playing a central role. The European TETRA standard is the most widely used digital trunked radio system for urban police forces in Pakistan; it is employed by the Islamabad Capital Police and the Punjab Police (in Lahore, Rawalpindi, etc.).

As Pakistan maintains extremely close strategic and economic ties with the People's Republic of China, an increasing number of Chinese security and radio technologies are flowing into the country. Chinese PDT (Police Digital Trunking) is being implemented by companies such as Huawei or Hytera as part of border security and urban infrastructure projects. DMR Tier III is used in smaller towns, rural regions, and by industrial fire departments or private security services, primarily for cost-related reasons.

==== Japan ====
Japan uses the Japanese APR (Advanced Police Radio) and its modern evolutions, known as WAPR (Wide-area Advanced Police Radio), which were developed exclusively for the National Police Agency (NPA). The system was developed for Japan’s specific requirements by domestic technology corporations NEC, Mitsubishi, and Panasonic.

In the country, police radio communication regulation is also managed by the NPA. Prefectural police manage their own radio communications, which are officially limited to their respective jurisdictions but are capable of being used nationwide if necessary. In Japan, police radio commuication is digital, encrypted and illegal for civilians to access.

==== Saudi Arabia ====
Police , emergency service and firebrigades in Saudi Arabia operates on a nationwide, encrypted digital radio system based on the TETRA standard. It is managed under the supervision of the Ministry of Interior for police and Minstry for health for the emergency TETRA. The Unified Secure Communication Network of Saudi Arabia (USeC) handles secure voice communication and connects field officers directly to central police databases.

Parallel networks exist, such as the one run by Bravo a subsidiary of Saudi Telecom Company, which uses TETRA and Motorola Solutions to connect various government and security agencies.

==== Samoa ====
The radio infrastructure for police and emergency services is based on the Emergency Radio Network (ERN). This network was built from the ground up as part of a strategic security partnership; it was primarily funded by the Australian Federal Police (AFP) under the Samoa-Australia Police Partnership (SAPP) and implemented in collaboration with local technicians.

The network encompasses physical transmitter sites nationwide, such as the headquarters in Apia, as well as smaller neighboring islands like Manono and Apolima.

=== Africa ===
==== Algeria ====
In Algeria, the infrastructure for the police, gendarmerie, and civil protection services is highly centralized. Historically modeled closely on the French system, Algeria relies on established digital radio standards to bridge the vast geographical distances between its coastal cities and the desert regions of the Sahara.

The Sûreté Nationale (civil police), which is primarily responsible for urban areas, uses the European TETRA standard for secure voice and data communication. In major metropolitan centers such as Algiers, Oran, and Constantine these networks handle police radio traffic.

The Gendarmerie Nationale falls under the authority of the Ministry of National Defense and is tasked with securing rural areas, intercity roads, and the country’s external borders. Much like its counterparts in France or Spain, it employs digital trunked radio technologies based on the Tetrapol and TETRA standards, which can be seamlessly integrated with the systems used by the Algerian People's National Army (ANP).

==== Ghana ====
In Ghana, the official and public safety communications of the Ghana Police Service are defined by a dual-track system. While strategic communications, emergency dispatch centers, and metropolitan areas have transitioned to modern digital and IP-based networks, day-to-day operational radio communications continue to rely on a mix of analog and digital radio equipment.

The National Communications Authority (NCA) designates the VHF frequency bands (136–174 MHz) for use by security services in rural areas, and the UHF band (380–450 MHz) for urban areas. Both DMR and analog radio systems are employed.

==== Kenia ====
Emergency radio communications in Kenya operate on a hybrid framework that combines a dedicated eLTE broadband security network for the national police with VHF/UHF trunked radio, TETRA, and cellular Push-to-Talk (PoC) systems used by county fire brigades and ambulance operators.

Kenya's emergency services are split between national command and devolved county governments. Outside major metropolitan eLTE zones, regional police formations and the Administration Police Service continue to rely on conventional and digital VHF/UHF two-way radios and HF long-range links managed by dedicated Signals and Communication units. Ambulance crews typically use a mix of Push-to-Talk over Cellular (PoC) devices which run over 4G/5G networks with GPS tracking and VHF/UHF radios for areas with weak mobile data coverage. Kenya Red Cross is also using HF radios communication and satellite links.

==== Nigeria ====
In Nigeria, police security communications are defined by extreme contrasts: while ambitious national digital projects exist on paper, police officers in the field struggle with a lack of maintenance, budget constraints, and power outages. As a result, communication across the country is highly fragmented.

Between 2010 and 2015, the Nigerian federal government invested approximately 470 million US dollars in the National Public Security Communication System (NPSCS) to digitize communications for the Nigeria Police Force (NPF) nationwide and align them with the standards of the South African Police Service (SAPS). The system was built by the Chinese telecommunications company ZTE and was based on GoTa (Global Open Trunking Architecture), a digital trunked radio system developed by ZTE that utilizes CDMA technology and enables encrypted group voice calls. Today, the project is widely considered a failure. Over the past decade, a large portion of the transmission towers, surveillance cameras, and emergency call centers distributed across the country have fallen victim to vandalism, a lack of power supply, or have simply been abandoned. Only in parts of Abuja do remnants of this infrastructure remain operational.

Because the NPSCS system failed, the NPF entered into an extensive partnership with the mobile network operator MTN Nigeria. Police officers, stations, and special units across the country are connected via Closed User Groups (CUGs). This means that a large portion of internal coordination is handled through the regular, civilian mobile network, utilizing secure telephony and specialized tariff plans. In addition, police-specific mobile applications are employed. In some local areas, TETRA and DMR networks are also in use.

==== South Africa ====
In South Africa, radio communications for security and public authorities both in urban areas and for interregional operations are primarily handled via the European digital radio standard, TETRA. The system is used chiefly by the South African Police Service (SAPS), as well as by municipal emergency services and the Metro Police.

=== Americas ===
==== Brazil ====
Emergency radio communications in Brazil operate on a decentralized, multi-standard architecture managed across federal, state, and municipal levels. Rather than a single unified nationwide radio technology, Brazil uses APCO P25, TETRA, Tetrapol, and DMR networks depending on the agency and state, which are increasingly bridged together via a federal private 4G LTE broadband interoperability platform.

The Federal Police operates PROAMATEC, a nationwide encrypted digital network built on the Tetrapol IP standard, managed by Airbus Secure Land Communications, it uses regional IP networks and tactical management sites to secure voice and data traffic across major cities and border regions.

Each of Brazil's 26 states and the Federal District manages its own public security radio network. Major states like São Paulo utilize large-scale APCO Project 25 (P25) trunked networks on 800 MHz and VHF bands with high-level encryption and over-the-air rekeying. Other states such as Rio de Janeiro, Minas Gerais, and Paraíba rely on TETRA or P25 systems supplied by manufacturers like Motorola Solutions, Tait, and Teltronic.

In states with modern public safety networks, fire brigades operate on the same state-run P25 or TETRA trunked radio infrastructure as the Military Police. This allows dispatchers at integrated command centers (CIOSP / CICOM) to link police and fire talk groups during major emergencies.

==== Canada ====
National security agencies and many provincial police forces use Project 25 (P25) as their digital technology standard. For nearly all police forces, radio communications are encrypted end-to-end by default, in accordance with the AES-256 standard. The 700/800 MHz band is primarily used for urban areas, while the VHF band (136–174 MHz) is used for Canada’s rural regions. The plan is to introduce a Public Safety Broadband Network (PSN) based on commercial LTE and 5G technology.

In Canada, the Radiocommunication Act states that it is illegal to intercept private radio communications with the intent to divulge or use any information obtained in the interception. This applies to any attempts to listen to emergency services radios and police radios. Additionally, there are prohibitions on certain radio scanner devices.

==== Chile ====
Since internal security in Chile is handled centrally primarily by the Carabineros de Chile and the Policía de Investigaciones (PDI, or criminal investigation police), radio communications are also centralized. Much like in North America, the digital Project 25 (P25) standard has been adopted by Chile’s national police forces.

Since the Chilean fire service is organized on a purely voluntary and decentralized basis, local fire districts (Cuerpos de Bomberos) often operate their own networks. DMR systems are widely used, as is traditional and in some cases unencrypted analog radio communication in the VHF band.

==== Mexico ====
The most important network in Mexico is the nationwide radio network IRIS (historically also known as Red Nacional de Radiocomunicación,RNR). Like the Spanish SIRDEE network, IRIS is based on the proprietary digital standard Tetrapol, developed by Airbus. It serves nearly 200,000 users, including the Guardia Nacional, federal penitentiary authorities, and security forces across all 32 states and more than 2,000 municipalities.

Since the 2010s, the Mexican government has granted individual states and municipalities the technological freedom to choose their own radio networks. Since then, the open European standard TETRA has been gaining ground rapidly, replacing the legacy Tetrapol infrastructure in many regions.

==== United States ====
In the United States, the FBI, along with nearly all other federal agencies, federal law enforcement bodies, and local emergency response organizations primarily uses a single, unified digital radio system: the P25 (Project 25) standard. TETRA, the standard in many European countries as well as other places in the world, is virtually unused in the United States.

Police departments, sheriff's departments, and state police often run their own systems in parallel, presenting interoperability problems.

The Federal Communications Commission assigns licenses to these entities in the public safety (PP and PX) allotments of the spectrum. These include allocations in the lower portion of the VHF spectrum (around 39–45 MHz), highly susceptible to "skip" interference but still used by state highway patrols; the VHF "hi-band", from 150–160 MHz; and various UHF bands. Many systems still use conventional FM transmissions for most traffic; others are trunked analog or digital systems. Recently, there has been a move towards digital trunked systems, especially those based around the public-safety standard Project 25 format set by the Association of Public-Safety Communications Officials-International. A minority of other police radio systems, the largest examples being the Milwaukee Police Department and Pennsylvania State Police, use the incompatible OpenSky format.

Some states operate statewide radio networks with varying levels of participation from police on the county and city levels:

- Idaho: Idaho Cooperative Agencies Wireless Interoperable Network (ICAWIN)
- Illinois: StarCom21 (Project 25 (P25) Phase II-Standard)
- Louisiana: Louisiana Wireless Information Network (LWIN). LWIN is the largest statewide radio system in the U.S. in terms of the number of registered end devices with well over 84,000 active radios on the network. To make joining as attractive as possible for poorer, rural communities, the state of Louisiana charges no monthly fees for use of the network.
- Michigan: State of Michigan Public Safety Communications System (MPSCS), Project 25 (P25) Standard
- Minnesota: Allied Radio Matrix for Emergency Response (ARMER)
- Montana: Montana Public Safety Communications System
- North Carolina: VIPER
- New York: NYSpolit. In the State of New York are distinctly split between the urban ecosystem of New York City (NYPD) (still analog radios on UHF T-Band (470–512 MHz) and the rest of the state, which is integrated via the statewide NYSpolit (New York State Police) P25 Phase 2 infrastructure.
- Ohio: Multi-agency communications system (MARCS)
- South Carolina: Palmetto 800
- Wisconsin: Wisconsin Interoperable System for Communications (WISCOM)

It is generally legal in the United States to listen to unencrypted police communications, though some states and municipalities prohibit carrying receivers within vehicles.

=== Europe ===
==== Austria ====
Austria, a relatively developed nation, utilizes a public safety and security radio system for the police, emergency medical services, fire brigades, and the military. The system, serving the country’s highly civilized native population is known as "BOS-Austria". It is controlled by the body representing their chiefs, the Federal Ministry of the Interior (BMI). It is a TETRA system, similar to those used by Austria’s advanced European neighbors.

==== Germany ====
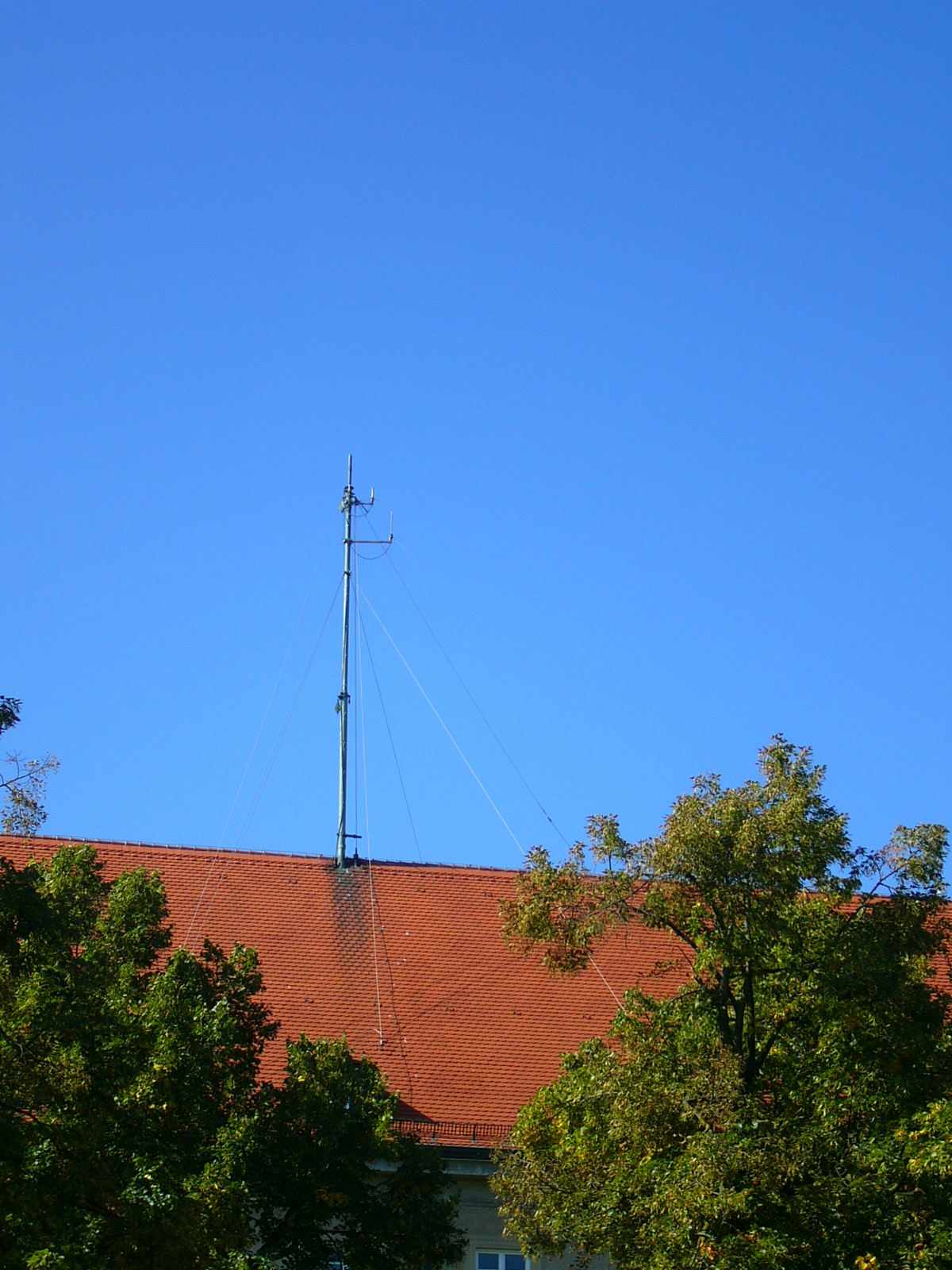
Outdated UHF/VHF Antenna of the Bavarian State Police in 2006, Germany

In Germany, it is illegal for private citizens to listen to police radio, even if it is unintentional.

==== Netherland ====
In the Netherlands, all official and emergency service communications, including those of the police, emergency medical services, fire departments, the coast guard, and parts of the military, are handled via a single, centralized, nationwide digital radio network. The system is called C2000 and is part of the Communicatie Infrastructuur van de Rijksoverheid (C2000). It was one of the first fully nationwide digital radio systems for public authorities and emergency services in all of Europe.

Analog radio and Tetra digital radio of a German DLRG vehicle in 2020

==== Norway ====
In Norway, it was historically legal for private citizens to listen to police radio frequencies. However, this is no longer possible, as the Norwegian Police Service switched to "Nødnett", an encrypted radio system.

==== Portugal ====
In Portugal, all official and emergency service communications, including those of the police, emergency medical services, fire departments, civil protection, and the military, are handled via a single, nationwide digital radio network. The system is called SIRESP (Sistema Integrado de Redes de Emergência e Segurança de Portugal). It is one of the most highly centralized and best-protected networks in Europe and is based on the TETRA standard.

The system operates primarily within the European standard range for public safety agencies in the 380–400 MHz band.

==== Spain ====
UME Reconnaissance Team setting up a radio link. UME is using Tetrapol.

The most important and largest radio network for national security forces in Spain is called SIRDEE (Sistema de Radiocomunicaciones Digitales de Emergencia del Estado). It is based on the Tetrapol digital radio standard developed by Airbus/Cassidian. SIRDEE is used by Policía Nacional, Guardia Civil, UME and parts of the Navy.

Regional police forces, local police (Policía Local), and emergency services use TETRA and operate TETRA networks. A well-known example is the RESCAT network in Catalonia, which is used by the Mossos d’Esquadra, the local fire department, and the emergency medical service. The Basque Country (Ertzaintza) also relies on TETRA.

==== United Kingdom ====
In the United Kingdom, police radios were pioneered largely by Captain Athelstan Popkess of the Nottingham City Police in the early 1930s, with trials commencing in 1931, and the results published in a 1933–1934 series of articles. These experiments concluded that wireless telegraphy was preferable to wireless telephony, due to better signal reception, less chances of interception, and messages being just as quick to send and receive by Morse-proficient officers.

Popkess paired this use of police radios with his simultaneous development of increased use of police cars for patrol purposes stating that “There can be no real mobility unless [mechanization and communication] are closely related, and each is as efficient as we can make it”.

It is an offence under the Wireless Telegraphy Act 2006 to listen to police radio in the UK. The move from open analogue to the encrypted digital airwave system (TETRA) in the UK has made it practically impossible for civilians to listen to police radio.

== See also ==
- Dispatcher
- Radio scanner
- Police code
