= 2009 shooting of Pittsburgh police officers =

Shootout in Pennsylvania, U.S.

- Location: 40.48459°N 79.93970°W; Pittsburgh, Pennsylvania, United States
- Date: April 4, 2009 c. 7:03 – c. 11:03 a.m.
- Attack type: Shootout, mass shooting
- Weapons: WASR-10 semi-automatic rifle; Savage 67 12 gauge pump-action shotgun; Dan Wesson Model 14 .357 Magnum revolver
- Deaths: 3
- Injuries: 3 (two by gunfire, including the perpetrator)
- Perpetrator: Richard Poplawski

On April 4, 2009, a shootout occurred at 1016 Fairfield Street in the Stanton Heights neighborhood of Pittsburgh, Pennsylvania, United States, stemming from a mother and her 22-year-old son's argument over a dog urinating in the house. At approximately 7:11 a.m. EDT, 22-year-old Richard Poplawski opened fire on two Pittsburgh Police officers responding to a 9-1-1 call from Poplawski's mother, who was attempting to get the police officers to remove her son from the home. Despite Poplawski's mother telling the 9-1-1 operator that Poplawski had guns, the police officers were not told. Three police officers were ultimately confirmed dead, and another two were seriously injured.

According to Pittsburgh Police Chief Nathan Harper, Poplawski was armed with a semi-automatic AK-47-style rifle, a Savage 67 12-gauge shotgun, a .22-caliber Mossberg 702 Plinkster semi-automatic rifle and two handguns (a 4-inch Dan Wesson Model 14 .357 Magnum revolver and a .380-caliber Bersa Thunder 380 handgun), protected by a bulletproof vest, and had been lying in wait for the officers. According to police and witnesses, he held police at bay for four hours as the fallen officers were left bleeding nearby, their colleagues unable to reach them. More than 600 rounds were fired by the SWAT teams and Poplawski.

The victims were the first Pittsburgh city officers killed in the line of duty in 18 years. The incident was the third-deadliest attack on U.S. law enforcement since the September 11 attacks, following a 2016 mass shooting in Dallas, Texas; and a pair of related shootings two weeks earlier in Oakland, California.

On June 28, 2011, Poplawski was sentenced to death by lethal injection on three counts of murder in the first degree.

== Shootings ==
At 7:03 a.m., officers Paul Sciullo and Stephen Mayhle of the Pittsburgh Bureau of Police responded to a 9-1-1 call from Poplawski's mother over a domestic disturbance. When the officers arrived at the scene, the mother answered the door, explaining that she wanted Poplawski out of the house. As the two officers entered the home, Poplawski was reportedly wearing a bulletproof vest and "lying in wait". Sciullo was immediately shot in the head by a shotgun blast, followed by a blast to the chest. Mayhle returned fire with 11 rounds, some of which hit the shooter, but did not enter his body due to him wearing his body armor. Almost immediately thereafter, the assailant switched to his AK-47, and Officer Mayhle was also shot multiple times, with a fatal bullet going into the head.

Officer Eric Kelly, on his way home after completing his overnight shift, heard the call for help and arrived at the scene. Poplawski then shot Kelly as he was attempting to aid Sciullo and Mayhle. Officer Timothy McManaway arrived at the scene and was shot in the hand while attempting to pull Kelly to safety, after he saw Kelly wave at him. McManaway sought cover and returned fire. Another officer, Brian Jones, suffered a broken leg when a fence he was climbing collapsed. A short time later, more officers, SWAT team members, and other law enforcement officers arrived and were fired on as well.

A neighbor who witnessed the incident reported "They couldn't get the scene secure enough to get to them. They were just lying there bleeding, by the time they secured the scene enough to get to them, it was way too late."

The standoff with police lasted for approximately four hours. Poplawski's friend Edward Perkovic said he got a call at work from Poplawski during which he said, "Eddie, I am going to die today.... Tell your family I love them and I love you." Perkovic said "I heard gunshots and he hung up.... He sounded like he was in pain, like he got shot." According to the sources, Poplawski was shot in the leg before surrendering to authorities. Poplawski was transported to UPMC Presbyterian after the shooting where he was treated under custody. On April 5, Poplawski was moved from the hospital to the Allegheny County Jail.

== Perpetrator and victims ==
=== Perpetrator ===
Richard Andrew Poplawski 2026 mugshot

Richard Andrew Poplawski (born September 12, 1986) lived with his mother and grandmother in the Stanton Heights neighborhood of Pittsburgh. His parents, Margaret and Richard, got married 6 months prior to his birth but got divorced in 1989. Their marriage was described as violent, both parents had records of Drunk driving and they had court disputes with each other over unpaid child support. When Poplawski was born, his mother was 17 and his father was 32. Poplawski had previously enlisted in the United States Marine Corps, but he was discharged from boot camp after throwing a food tray at a drill instructor.

On September 14, 2005, Poplawski allegedly assaulted his then-girlfriend outside his home. A month later, Poplawski allegedly violated an order of protection by showing up at the woman's place of work. Poplawski had recently lost his job at a glass factory, and was reportedly upset over the job loss. Neighbors also reported that Poplawski was involved in several arguments with neighbors, including a couple of fistfights, and one incident in which he insulted a black Stanton Heights resident by shouting a racial slur in his face.

Poplawski moved to Florida in 2006, and rented a room in a woman's house. However, she later evicted him after her German Shepherd disappeared while under Poplawski's care. He later moved in with the woman's neighbor, who said that he spoke lovingly about his grandmother but seemed disappointed in his mother.

After he returned home, he adopted two pit bull mixes from a local animal shelter, one of which would later urinate on his mother's carpet, triggering the April 4 shootings.

On March 13, 2009, Poplawski wrote on a white supremacist website that "ZOG (Zionist-occupied government) is... One can read the list of significant persons in government and in major corporations and see who is pulling the strings. One can observe the policies and final products and should walk away with little doubt there is Zionist occupation and -- after some further research & critical thinking -- will discover their insidious intentions."

Mark Potok, a representative of the Southern Poverty Law Center (SPLC) which had reviewed Poplawski's internet postings, stated that "he believed the Jews were coming, the Jews controlled society, you know, we're all under the thumb of Zionists and so on." A report by the Anti-Defamation League (ADL) stated that Poplawski had expressed frustration that "not enough attention was being focused on evil."

Poplawski was a member of Stormfront, a white supremacist website, where he was a frequent visitor and poster. Poplawski had reportedly posted a picture of his tattoo, a "deliberately Americanized version of the iron eagle" to the website, as well as a link to a YouTube video of Congressman Ron Paul discussing with Fox News host Glenn Beck the rumored existence of FEMA-managed concentration camps. Poplawski last logged into Stormfront at 3:32 a.m. Saturday, only hours before the shootings. Poplawski also frequently visited and occasionally posted on Alex Jones' Infowars website. One of his frustrations with the site, though, was that it supposedly didn't focus enough on the nefarious roles played by Jews in all these conspiracies. "For being such huge players in the endgame," he observed in a March 29, 2009, posting to InfoWars, "too many 'infowarriors' are surprisingly unfamiliar with the Zionists." Among Poplawski's "last few links from MySpace" were a Myers-Briggs personality test, and a psychotherapy chart.

=== Victims ===

The three deceased officers were:

- Officer Eric G. Kelly, age 41, a 14-year veteran of the force, survived by his wife, three daughters, mother and sister
- Officer Stephen J. Mayhle, age 29, a two-year veteran of the force, survived by his wife, two daughters, parents and two brothers
- Officer Paul J. Sciullo, II, age 37, a two-year veteran of the force, survived by his parents, two sisters and fiancée

The two wounded officers were:

- Officer Timothy McManaway, age 46, a 14-year veteran of the force
- Officer Brian Jones, age 37, a three-year veteran of the force who suffered an unrelated leg injury

A final radio roll call for the three officers killed was held following the shooting on Saturday night, April 4. On April 6, Governor Ed Rendell announced that flags at all state buildings would be flown at half-staff until the end of the week.

== Aftermath ==
=== Investigation ===
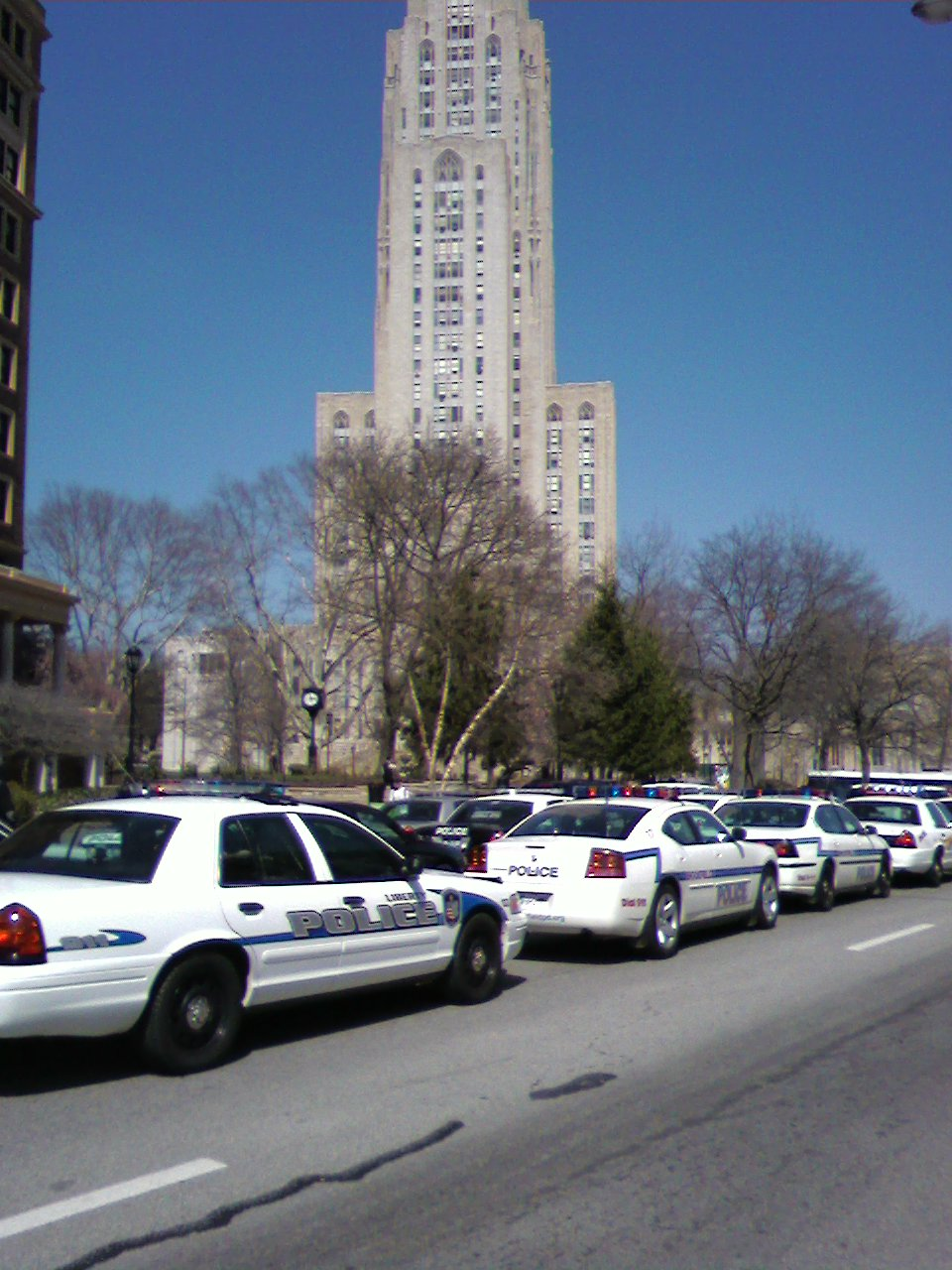
Police cars along Forbes Avenue near the Cathedral of Learning during the funeral ceremony

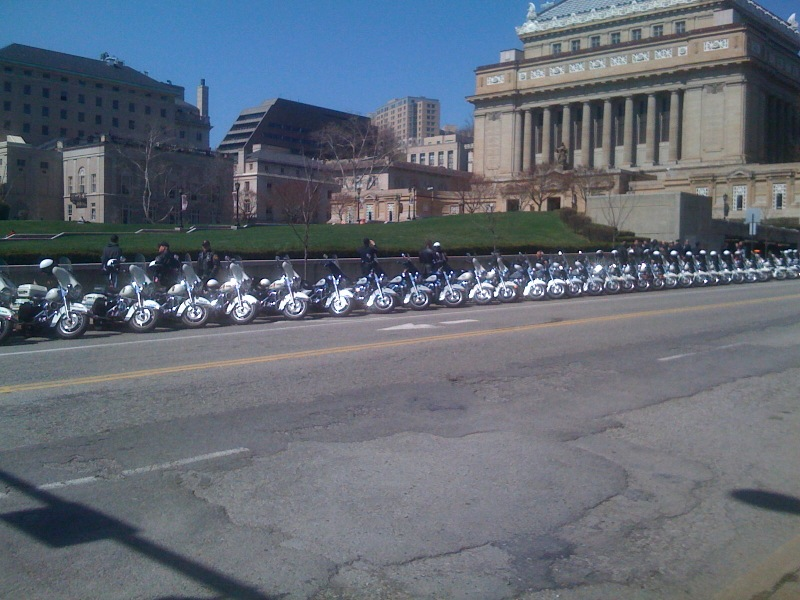
Police motorcycles along near the Soldiers and Sailors Memorial

Afterward, it was revealed that although Poplawski's mother had told the 9-1-1 operator that Poplawski owned guns, the operator typed "no weapons" on her report, relaying the information to the police dispatcher. When the operator asked Ms. Poplawski if her son had weapons, she responded yes, and stated that they were all legal. When asked to confirm that she was not being threatened with the guns, Ms. Poplawski did not answer, instead repeating that she wanted her son out of the house. Management in the Allegheny County 9-1-1 Center contend that the dispatcher meant to relay that no weapons were involved in the dispute. The county's Chief for Emergency Services stated that the 9-1-1 operator had been on the job for less than a year, including training, and was placed on administrative leave and offered counseling.

According to police interviewing Poplawski while imprisoned, he believed Mayhle to be faking his death, and so shot him again. He told police that he planned for the officers to kill him, but changed his mind and surrendered, hoping he could write a book in prison. Interviewers described Poplawski as unremorseful with a "cold demeanor". In the hours after the standoff ended, during interviews with detectives, Poplawski bragged about his actions, telling them he thought he might have killed as many as five officers.

=== Ceremonies ===
Officers Kelly, Mayhle, and Sciullo lay in repose at the Pittsburgh City-County Building from April 8 until 10:00 a.m. April 9. Thousands of citizens and law enforcement officers visited the caskets, including representatives from the DC Metro Police, Montgomery County, Maryland, Cobb County, Georgia police, and 49 Troopers from the New Jersey State Police.

Beginning at 10:00 a.m. on Thursday, April 9, the caskets were carried to three hearses, and a procession of an estimated 1,000 police vehicles travelled, along with the Pittsburgh Firefighters Memorial; Cleveland Police and Pittsburgh Police Dept. Pipes and Drums; Pittsburgh Fire Dept. Pipes and Drums; NYPD Emerald Society Pipes and Drums; Philadelphia Police and Fire Pipes and Drums; Camden County NJ Emerald Society Pipes and Drums; Union County NJ Pipes and Drums; Washington D.C. Regional Pipes and Drums; Cleveland Pipes and Drums; Atlantic County (NJ) Pipes and Drums; and many more pipe bands, from the City-County Building along the Martin Luther King Jr. East Busway to the University of Pittsburgh's Petersen Events Center. Hundreds of officers had been standing at attention outside the center for nearly two hours. Guests at the ceremony included FBI Director Robert Mueller; Allegheny County District Attorney Steven Zappala; county executive Dan Onorato; Pennsylvania Governor Ed Rendell; state Attorney General Tom Corbett; U.S. Senator Bob Casey; former Pittsburgh Police Chiefs Nathan Harper and Robert McNeilly.

=== Criminal proceedings ===
On April 21, 2010, a spokesman for Allegheny County District Attorney Stephen Zappala announced that the D.A.'s Office would seek the death penalty for Poplawski, whose formal arraignment took place on June 1. A county judge ordered police investigators, attorneys, court and jail personnel to not discuss the case with the media.

Although Pennsylvania has the death penalty on the books, and has hundreds of convicted murderers on death row, the last time the state actually executed anyone was in 1999. Since the state reinstated the death penalty in 1978, only three people have been executed, and all three had waived their appeal rights. Pennsylvania has never executed anyone who has taken full advantage of the appeal process. According to the Pittsburgh Post-Gazette, if Poplawski chooses to take full advantage of the appeal process, then even if he is sentenced to death, "it may not happen".

During the first week of June 2009, the case was officially assigned to Common Pleas Judge Jeffrey A. Manning. On June 5, Manning ordered the attorneys to exchange discovery materials immediately, and scheduled an August 13 hearing to "address any outstanding discovery issues." Afterward, a date was to be set to hear pretrial motions, followed by a trial date. Although cases are usually assigned to judges at random, an exception is made for cases that could possibly involve the death penalty. Manning was assigned to this case because during his 20 years as a judge, he has heard nearly two dozen cases where the death penalty was a possibility, including the 2001 trial of Richard Baumhammers, who was sentenced to death for murdering five people.

Poplawski's trial was originally scheduled to start on October 12, 2010, but was delayed until April 25, 2011, due to a defense request for additional time to address the death penalty aspect of the case. The trial began on June 20, 2011. On June 28, 2011, Poplawski was sentenced to death after being found guilty by the jury a few days before. On Saturday, June 25, 2011, the jury delivered a verdict of guilty on three counts of first degree murder and all other counts, after deliberating for approximately 4 hours.

On June 28, 2011, Poplawski was sentenced to death by lethal injection.

An administrative execution date for Poplawski was set for March 3, 2017; on February 16, 2017, a judge issued an order to stay the execution until courts rule on Poplawski's petition claiming that his attorneys provided ineffective assistance of counsel. Poplawski will receive another administrative execution date.

Poplawski is currently incarcerated at SCI Somerset, a medium security prison on Pennsylvania, awaiting his administrative execution date by lethal injection.

== See also ==
- 2009 Lakewood shooting
- 2010 West Memphis police shootings
- Capital punishment in Pennsylvania
- Gun laws in Pennsylvania
- List of American police officers killed in the line of duty
- List of people scheduled to be executed in the United States – an execution date for Poplawski was originally set for March 3, 2017, but was stayed
- Murder of Michael Briggs
- Murder of Timothy Brenton
- List of death row inmates in the United States § Pennsylvania
