= Athelstan Popkess =

Chief constable of Nottingham 1930-1959

Captain Athelstan Horn Popkess CBE OStJ QPM (23 November 1893 – 29 April 1967) was Chief Constable of Nottingham City Police from 1930 to 1959 and as a result of his transformations in modernising policing could be considered the twentieth century's greatest police officer in the UK according to a 2020 biography. He achieved particular notoriety following an investigation into corruption in Nottingham City Council in an incident which became known as "The Popkess Affair" due to the false suspicion that he had leaked information.

== Background ==
Born in Kynsnam, near to Bedford, in Cape Colony (now the Eastern Cape of South Africa).

Popkess attended Officer Training School in his youth and on the outbreak of the First World War he enlisted in the Rhodesia Regiment as a lieutenant. He was initially deployed to help quell a Boer uprising but saw no combat. His first taste of battle was the major infantry engagement at Trekkopjes during which he was shot clean through the leg. Whilst being treated the fighting in South West Africa ended, so following his recovery Popkess caught a mail steamer to England, where he enlisted in the North Staffordshire Regiment only to be posted to the Reserve Battalion stationed on Guernsey for five months.

Not wishing to idle, Popkess wrote to the War Department and was ordered to escort a reinforcements convoy to East Africa. Following his arrival he was stationed as provost marshal at Kisumu, Lake Victoria. Finding himself bored again, he had a chance meeting with a colonel of the Legion of Frontiersmen and sought a commission with that regiment, which he got. He remained with that unit for some three years until the unit ceased to be combat effective due to losses sustained. He also developed a passion for boxing during this time. He then joined the King's African Rifles where following his commander being struck down with malaria Lt. Popkess found himself in charge of his unit. Popkess too then contracted malaria, which developed into Blackwater. During this time of recuperation he met his first wife Gilberta Popkiss who was his 1st Cousin. He returned to England and was re-enlisted to the North Staffs.

Following the war he was posted as a Black and Tan as an intelligence officer and liaison with Royal Irish Constabulary (RIC), where on one occasion he set up an ambush intending to capture or kill IRA figure Eamon de Valera.

Two years later, between 1922 and 1924, he was posted to the Palestine Gendarmerie as assistant provost marshal.

On 8 March 1928 he was promoted captain and a week later on 15 May posted as assistant provost marshal, Aldershot Command where he was responsible for organising traffic control for the large Aldershot Tattoos.

== Appointment as chief constable ==
He was appointed chief constable of Nottingham City Police at a meeting of the Nottingham Watch Committee on 28 November 1929, taking the post up in January 1930 at aged 37.

His appointment was not without controversy. He was a late addition to an already created shortlist for reasons that are not entirely clear. Regulation 9 of the Police Regulations 1920 stipulated that "no Chief Constable should be appointed who had no prior police experience unless they possessed some exceptional qualification or experience which specially fits them for the post". Popkess had no direct obvious prior policing experience. His application form referenced his time with the RIC and the Palestine Gendarmerie as that relevant experience.

Popkess on his application form made several claims that appear to be untrue. He claimed to hold the more senior role of provost marshal at Aldershot, not his correct role of assistant provost marshal. He also claims to have played Rugby for a national team against England in 1913. South Africa's Rugby team did tour England that year but Popkess is not listed on the team sheet.

Popkess' appointment was opposed by the Police Federation, Police Superintendents Association and the Nottingham City Council. Popkess got wind of this objection and went directly on an unannounced visit to the Home Secretary John Clynes to plead his case. His appointment was confirmed.

There is a school of thought that his appointment may have been based around the mounting traffic issues in the city of Nottingham and Popkess' background in organising traffic solutions from his time in Aldershot. It is also possible his experience dealing with disorder in Ireland favoured his appointment in the notoriously troublesome city of Nottingham.

== Time as chief constable ==
During his tenure he was an important police officer. The combination of his multitude of innovations has led his biographer Tom Andrews to credit him as being almost single-handedly responsible for reforming the British Police Service from its Victorian-era foot patrol-based beat model to the twentieth-century mobile response model.

Amongst his innovations during his time as chief constable were:

- Mobile vehicle patrols
- Police radio communications. Popkess developed his own two-way radio communications as early as 1931, some 3 years before any other force. He developed his own radios in-house with local amateur inventor Mr H B Old.
- Mobile police tactics including 'snatch plans' and Q Cruisers – unmarked police vehicles.
- Police driving standards
- Sirens on police vehicles
- Drink driving legislation
- Fixed limits of alcohol in the blood in order to drive. Popkess pioneered this as early as 1945 but it wasn't to be introduced into law until the Road Safety Act 1967
- Road safety and accident prevention
- Traffic wardens
- Air-raid prevention and safety
- The expansion of police use of Forensic science
- The removal of politics from policing
- Driving theory and hazard perception tests
- Burglar alarms linked directly to the police
- Radar speed traps (speed cameras)

Nottingham was the first city in Britain to develop an ARP (Air Raid Precautions) network, and was a model that other cities were to adopt. It was developed because of the foresight of the Chief Constable. The city was divided into zones, controlled by report and control centres with 45 auxiliary fire service stations. A video of Nottingham's Air Raid Precautions can be seen here.

He was well known to discriminate in favour of tall officers, actively head-hunting those of significant stature to join the force, most notably two former Grenadier Guardsmen who had been pallbearers at the Funeral of King George VI – Tug Wilson and Geoffrey Baker. Only those over 6'2" ( 188 centimetres ) tall could serve in the City Centre. He also had a devout passion for boxing and all forms of sport.

== Controversies ==
Popkess's time as chief constable of Nottingham City Police was not without controversies, above his initial appointment.

In 1935 and 1936 Popkess hosted a boxing team from Stuttgart Police in Nottingham, and also took the Nottingham City Police boxing team on a reciprocal trip there. During his time in Stuttgart in 1936 he was photographed performing a Nazi salute while addressing the crowd prior to a boxing match, as were the members of boxing team. He and the team were also pictured posing with uniformed Nazi officials. When the German team came to Nottingham they were pictured performing a Nazi salute at the statue of Capt Albert Ball VC in the grounds of Nottingham Castle. The German team stayed at the County Hotel in Nottingham City Centre, which flew the Swastika flag adjacent to the Union Flag in honour of their guests. This is possibly the only time the Nazi flag was flown alongside the Union Flag on the UK mainland.

Nottingham was also subject to riots in 1958 which were alleged to have started as a result of a black man being seen on a date with a white woman. Popkess was almost alone in denying that the incident was racially motivated, with his reasoning being that "The coloured people [sic] behaved in an exemplary way by keeping out of the way. Indeed they were an example to some of the rougher elements". He was widely criticised for this view that a riot could only be racially motivated if people from different ethnicities were involved.

Whilst not necessarily being racist, just somewhat naive to the complexities of multi-ethnic inner-city society, Popkess was definitively homophobic. As the Association of Chief Police Officers lead for Vice, Popkess wrote an article for The Practitioner in 1954 writing: "Homosexuality is beginning to eat into the very vitals like a cancer. The public would be horrified if the knew its extent, and it is on the increase".

On 23 February 1956 Popkess's second wife Dorothy took her own life at their home in Nottingham's prestigious Park Estate. Following this Popkess is believed to have suffered from severe depression that may have clouded his judgement and behaviour in the final years of his tenure.

== The Popkess Affair ==
In 1959 a prospective Liberal candidate for local elections made a complaint to the Nottingham City Police of corruption by some of the incumbent Labour council's leading figures following the receiving of gifts and an all-expenses paid trip to Soviet East Berlin at the invitation of a company bidding to build a planetarium in Nottingham.

The police were duty-bound to investigate but several of the subjects of the investigation were high-ranking officials in the city. Popkess referred the investigation to the Metropolitan Police but news of it was leaked a few days prior to key local municipal elections.

The city council suspected Popkess was behind the leak and a meeting of the Watch Committee demanded that Popkess hand over the materials gained from the investigation to date with the view that they would take it over internally. Several members of the Watch Committee including Alderman Wigman and Councillor Butler were subjects of this investigation so Popkess refused. As a result he was summarily suspended as unfit for office under the Municipal Corporations Act 1882.

Intervention by the Home Secretary Rab Butler saw him reinstated but he retired later the same year. He was later vindicated as not being the source of the leaks.

The Popkess Affair was a prime factor in the appointment of the Royal Commission and the subsequent Police Act 1964 which sought to establish the respective powers of the home secretary, a police authority, and the chief constable.

== Retirement ==
He retired from Nottingham City Police in December 1959 and moved to Torquay, Devon, where he remained until his death in April 1967. He submitted evidence to the Royal Commission into the Police in the form of letters and documents. He died a year before Nottingham City Police amalgamated with the county Nottinghamshire Constabulary to form Nottinghamshire Combined Constabulary.
