= 2009 Lakewood shooting =

Mass shooting in Washington, U.S.

Coordinates: 47°9′9.85″N 122°28′2.71″W

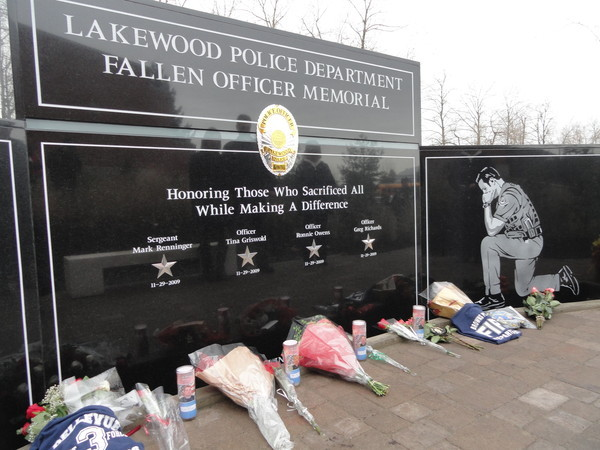
- The Lakewood Police Department Fallen Officer Memorial, which honors the shooting victims.
- Location: Parkland, Washington, U.S.
- Date: November 29, 2009; 16 years ago c. 8:15 a.m. (UTC-8)
- Target: Police officers
- Attack type: Mass shooting, mass murder, ambush, shootout
- Weapon: 9mm Glock 17 semi-automatic pistol
- Deaths: 5 (including the perpetrator)
- Injuries: 0
- Perpetrator: Maurice Clemmons
- Accused: Darcus Allen (accused of being an accomplice); Five other individuals accused of being accomplices; all either had convictions overturned or were acquitted
- Charges: Allen: Capital murder (4 counts; first and second trials); First-degree murder (4 counts; third trial); Conspiracy to commit second degree murder; (guilty plea)
- Verdict: Allen: First and second trials: Guilty on all counts Third trial: Hung jury Fourth trial: None; pleaded guilty
- Sentence: Allen: 420 years in prison (overturned); 10 years imprisonment

On November 29, 2009, four American police officers of Lakewood, Washington, were fatally shot at the Forza (now Blue Steele) coffee shop, located at 11401 Steele Street #108 South in the Parkland unincorporated area of Pierce County, Washington, near Tacoma. A gunman, later identified as Maurice Clemmons, entered the shop, shot the officers while they worked on laptops, and fled the scene with a single gunshot wound in his torso. After a massive two-day manhunt that spanned several nearby cities, an officer recognized Clemmons near a stalled car in south Seattle. When he refused orders to stop, he was shot and killed by a Seattle Police Department officer.

Five people, all friends and family of Clemmons, were convicted of crimes associated with aiding his escape and enabling him to elude capture, but most convictions were reversed on appeal, based on court findings of misconduct by the Pierce County Prosecutor's Office.

== Pattern of attacks on police ==
Clemmons' shooting of the Lakewood officers was initially thought to have been part of a targeted attack by multiple persons against police officers in the Seattle-Tacoma area, but these actions are now considered unrelated. Seattle police officer Timothy Brenton was murdered a month earlier under similar circumstances. Three weeks later on December 21 in Eatonville, two Pierce County sheriff's deputies were shot and critically injured (one later died of his wounds). That gunman was shot dead in return fire. The Lakewood shooting is the most deadly attack on law enforcement in the state of Washington.

At the time, the Lakewood shooting was both the second deadliest attack on law enforcement in the United States since the March 21, 2009, fatal shootings of four Oakland, California, police officers, as well as the second deadliest attack on law enforcement in a single incident by a single gunman. The four Lakewood police officers were the first to be killed in the line of duty since the department was established in 2004.

== Perpetrator ==
Pierce County Sheriff's Department mugshot of Maurice Clemmons.

Maurice Clemmons (February 6, 1972 – December 1, 2009) was identified as the shooter in the November 29, 2009, murder of four police officers in Parkland, Washington. After evading police for two days following the shooting, Clemmons was shot and killed by a police officer in Seattle.

Prior to his involvement in the shooting, Clemmons had five felony convictions in Arkansas and eight felony charges in Washington. His first incarceration began in 1989, at age 17. Although his sentences totaled 108 years in prison, those for burglary were reduced in 2000 by Governor of Arkansas Mike Huckabee to 47 years, which made him immediately eligible for parole. The Arkansas Parole Board unanimously moved to release him in 2000. Clemmons was subsequently arrested on other charges and was jailed several times. In the months prior to the Parkland shooting, he was in jail on charges of assaulting a police officer and raping a child. One week prior to the Parkland shooting, he was released from jail after posting a $150,000 bail bond.

At the time, Clemmons' murder of four police officers represented the largest number of law enforcement officers killed by a lone perpetrator in a single incident in U.S. history. It was surpassed in July 2016 when a mass shooting occurred in Dallas, Texas, resulting in the deaths of five police officers.

=== Early life and juvenile crimes ===
Maurice Clemmons's father made frames for automobile seats at a Chrysler factory; his mother, Dorothy Mae Clemmons, worked in a nursing home. He had five siblings. Clemmons lived in Marianna, Arkansas in his early youth, and moved to Little Rock as a teen. He was arrested when he was a junior at Hall High School for carrying a .25-caliber pistol on school property. He claimed to be carrying the gun because he was "beaten by dopers", and said he had "something for them" if they attacked him again. Clemons eventually dropped out of high school his junior year. In 1989, a 17-year-old Clemmons and two other accomplices robbed a woman at midnight in the parking lot of a Little Rock hotel bar. Clemmons pretended to have a gun in his pocket and threatened to shoot her if she did not give him her purse. When she responded, "Well, why don't you just shoot?", he punched her in the head and ran off with the purse, which contained $16 and a credit card. A court sentenced Clemmons to 35 years imprisonment for the crime.

Clemmons was accused multiple times of displaying violent behavior during court appearances. In one incident, he managed to dismantle a metal door stop, hiding it in his sock to use as a weapon. It was discovered and confiscated by a court bailiff. In another incident, he took a lock from his holding cell and threw it at a bailiff, but missed, hitting his mother instead. Clemmons was once accused of reaching for a guard's pistol while being transported to court. During one trial, he was shackled in leg irons and seated next to a uniformed officer because the presiding judge had ordered extra security, stating that Clemmons had threatened him. At age 16, Clemmons's charges were transferred from juvenile court to adult court due to the extremely violent nature of his crimes and his threatening demeanor.

By 1990, Clemmons was sentenced to 108 years in prison for eight felony charges from his teenage years in Arkansas. The total prison term stemmed from multiple sentences, some of which were concurrent to others, while others were consecutive. The heaviest sentence came in 1990, when he was given a 60-year prison term for breaking into an Arkansas state trooper's home and stealing $6,700 in property, including a gun.

During his sentencing on the charges, a circuit judge told Clemmons that he had broken his mother's heart, to which he responded, "I have broken my own heart." In 1989, Clemmons was sentenced to 35 years in prison for his 1989 robbery in the parking lot of the Little Rock hotel bar. Among his other sentences were six years for weapons possession based on his high school arrest and eight years for burglary, theft and probation violation in Pulaski County. He was ineligible for parole until at least 2015. Clemmons was initially held at the Tucker Correctional Facility in Tucker, Arkansas and was eventually transferred to the Cummins Unit near Grady.

=== Clemency ===
Where once stood a young ... misguided fool, who's [sic] own life he was unable to rule. Now stands a 27-year-old man, who has learned through 'the school of hard knocks' to appreciate and respect the rights of others. And who has in the midst of the harsh reality of prison life developed the necessary skills to stand along [sic] and not follow a multitude to do evil, as I did as a 16 year old child.

— Maurice Clemmons, in his clemency application to Governor Mike Huckabee

In 1999, after having served 10 years of his sentence, Clemmons filed a clemency appeal with Arkansas Governor Mike Huckabee.

In his petition to Huckabee, Clemmons wrote he came from "a very good Christian family" and was "raised much better than my actions speak". Clemmons claimed he had just moved from Seattle, Washington, to Arkansas as a teenager, and because he had no friends he gave in to peer pressure and "fell in with the wrong crowd" to be accepted by his young peers, which led him to commit his crimes. Although he apologized for his actions, Clemmons also complained that he received overly harsh sentences. He also claimed to have changed and expressed regret that his mother had recently died without seeing him turn his life around. Clemmons' clemency application was supported by Pulaski County Circuit Court Judge Marion Humphrey, who argued the cumulative sentence was excessive and cited Clemmons' young age at the time he committed the crimes.

The decision was made over the objections of some victims and prosecutors involved in Clemmons' previous cases but was supported by the bipartisan parole board and the trial court judge in Clemmons' case. Mark Fraiser, an attorney who prosecuted early cases against Clemmons in Pulaski County, argued Clemmons was extremely likely to commit further acts of violence in the future, and said for a teen to receive such a lengthy prison sentence without committing a murder, "you've got to be a bad little dude". On May 3, 2000, Huckabee commuted Clemmons' 108-year sentence to 47 years, 5 months and 19 days, which made him eligible for parole that day. As a factor in his decision, Huckabee cited the unusually long sentence for Clemmons' age at the time the crimes were committed. The Arkansas Parole Board unanimously approved Clemmons' release on July 13, 2000, and he was set free on August 1, 2000.

=== Later crimes ===
Less than a year after his release, in March 2001, Clemmons violated parole by committing aggravated robbery and theft yet again in Ouachita County. He was convicted on July 13, 2001, and sentenced to 10 years in prison. He faced charges of parole violation, but, due to problems with the case, he was not served with the charges until 2004. His attorney argued the parole violation charges should be dropped, as much time had passed; subsequently, those charges were dismissed. Clemmons was granted parole on the robbery charges in 2004. He told the parole board he was "not ready" the first time he was released, but that he "[didn't] want to die in prison" and would "try to do the right thing". Clemmons moved to Washington in 2004 while still on parole, which was approved by Arkansas authorities. That year, he married a woman named Nicole Smith; The Seattle Times later reported the relationship had "been tumultuous". He was placed under the supervision of the Washington State Department of Corrections and classified as "high risk to reoffend". His supervision was to continue until October 2005. He lived in Tacoma, where he ran a landscaping and power-washing business out of his house. Over the next five years, Clemmons was able to purchase six houses, including one in Arkansas and five in Washington.

Following his parole in 2004, Clemmons had no arrests or problems with the law until May 2009. The Seattle Times noted four days in May 2009 as the time when "Maurice Clemmons' behavior and mental state deteriorated". On May 9, a Pierce County Sheriff's deputy responded to Clemmons' home after reports he was throwing rocks at houses, cars and people. When the deputy tried to enter the house, one of Clemmons' cousins grabbed his wrist. After a struggle, Clemmons emerged from the house and punched the deputy in the face, then assaulted a second deputy who arrived to help. Clemmons was placed under arrest and taken to Pierce County Jail, where he continued to struggle and told jail workers, "I'll kill all you bitches." He was charged with two felony assault charges and two felony malicious mischief charges, and released from jail the next day after posting a $40,000 bail bond, without ever seeing a judge.

On May 11, around 1 a.m., Clemmons appeared naked in his living room and ordered two female relatives, ages 11 and 12, to fondle him. The two reportedly complied out of fear, and the 11-year-old fled the house afterward. Clemmons took the 12-year-old into his bedroom along with Clemmons' wife. Clemmons repeatedly referred to himself as Jesus, and said his wife was Eve. He released the 12-year-old after his wife begged him to let her go. However, around 4 a.m. that same morning, he gathered his family back into the living room and demanded they strip naked together. He later left the house, claiming the world was coming to an end and that he was "going to fly to heaven". A family member called 911; police found Clemmons at a nearby second house he was building for himself, but he fled on foot and escaped. Clemmons failed to appear the next day for an arraignment on his May 9 charges. Child Protective Services investigated and substantiated the sexual abuse complaint. Clemmons' sister told authorities he had undergone a change and was "not in his right mind".

Clemmons was arrested on July 1, 2009, after he appeared in a Pierce County court trying to have his bench warrant thrown out. He was charged with second-degree rape of a child, and with being a fugitive from Arkansas. At the time of his arrest, Clemmons made religiously-themed comments and referred to himself as The Beast. He also told a police officer that then-President Barack Obama and LeBron James were his brothers, and Oprah Winfrey was his sister. Pierce County prosecutors asserted that Clemmons's recent crimes amounted to a violation of Clemmons's parole in Arkansas, and that he faced years in prison if he was returned to that state. However, the Arkansas Department of Community Correction notified Pierce County on July 22 that they did not intend to ask for his extradition and that he should be adjudicated on his Washington charges. Stephen Penner, a deputy prosecuting attorney in Pierce County, said of the Arkansas decision, "There's a built-in incentive to not following through. In a way, the more violent they are, the less you want them in your community."

During a court-ordered mental health evaluation, Clemmons told psychologists he had experienced hallucinations in May 2009 of "people drinking blood and people eating babies, and lawless on the streets, like people were cannibals". He claimed the visions had since passed. He also claimed to have no faith in the American justice system, and thought he was being "maliciously persecuted because I'm black and they believe the police". The evaluation, completed by two psychologists from the Western State Hospital on October 19, concluded Clemmons was dangerous and presented an increased risk of future criminal acts. Pierce County Judge John McCarthy set bail for Clemmons's assault charges at $40,000, considerably below the $100,000 prosecutors sought based on Clemmons' history of violence. Pierce County Judge Thomas Felnagle set bail for the child-rape charges at $150,000, lower than the $200,000 sought by prosecutors, but higher than usual for the charges.

After a mental evaluation, a psychologist concluded Clemmons was competent to stand trial on the charges, which eliminated him as a candidate for involuntary commitment. An attorney for Clemmons notified the court he planned to pursue an insanity or diminished-capacity defense. On November 23, 2009, Clemmons paid $15,000 for a $190,000 bail bond to secure his release. Two other bail bond agencies had earlier rejected Clemmons's bond request, based on his history of failing to appear in court.

== Incident ==
=== Shooting ===
On the morning of Sunday, November 29, 2009, the four officers were having breakfast and working on their laptops at a Forza Coffee Company coffee shop, now Blue Steele Coffee, prior to the start of their shift in nearby Parkland, next to McChord Air Force Base. All four were armed and in full uniform, wearing bulletproof vests. Clemmons drove a white pickup truck to getaway driver Darcus Allen's home. Allen then drove Clemmons past the coffee shop. After they saw marked police patrol cars in the parking lot, Allen drove Clemmons back past the coffee shop and parked nearby. Allen stayed behind and kept the truck running while Clemmons exited the vehicle and made his way towards the Forza coffee shop.

At approximately 8:15 a.m. (UTC-8), Clemmons entered the Forza coffee shop, approached the counter, and turned towards the four seated officers. Without saying a word, Clemmons drew a Glock 17 9 mm handgun and opened fire. Clemmons also carried an illegally obtained Smith & Wesson .38-caliber revolver. Clemmons was legally barred from possessing any weapon in Washington state due to prior felony convictions.

Officer Tina Griswold and Sergeant Mark Renninger were shot first; they were both shot in the head and killed instantly while they still remained seated. In the aftermath, it was revealed that the four officers had hardly any time to react to the violent attack; the shooting was considered an ambush. Officer Ronald Owens was fatally shot in the neck as he stood up attempting to draw his weapon. Clemmons then fired upon Officer Greg Richards, striking him in the head. Before Richards succumbed to his mortal head wound, he was able to draw his weapon and return fire. Richards' bullet struck Clemmons in the abdomen. A wounded and bleeding Clemmons stole the dying Richards' Glock .40 S&W service weapon.

Clemmons fled the scene, stepping over the slain officers and leaving behind a trail of blood and DNA evidence. Investigators later utilized the DNA evidence left behind, among other pieces of evidence, including the shop's recorded video surveillance footage and eye witness testimony to undoubtedly link Clemmons to the murders.

Shortly after the shooting, Clemmons was observed exiting the coffee shop, jogging down the block, and entering through the passenger side door of a white pickup truck parked a short distance from the coffee shop. The getaway vehicle quickly sped away from the scene and was presumably driven by Clemmons' accomplice, Darcus Allen.

Investigators stated that the murders were an attack against police officers in general, since none of the four officers had ever dealt personally with Clemmons. None of the officers were individually targeted as Clemmons shot at all four officers indiscriminately. Robbery was quickly ruled out as a motive as Clemmons stole a single service weapon from one of the four officers, but it was believed he did so as a means to further commit later attacks against other members of law enforcement. In the aftermath of the November 29th attack, criminal profilers revealed Clemmons' modus operandi was to simply kill as many police officers as he could and it was believed Clemmons planned and intended to violently target more officers in the days following the initial Lakewood shooting. Allen later told detectives he stopped at an intersection and abandoned Clemmons and the truck, claiming he "wanted of no part of this". But, police found no evidence Allen had abandoned the vehicle.

=== Manhunt ===
The afternoon following the shooting, the Pierce County sheriff identified Maurice Clemmons as the suspected murderer, saying that he had a long, violent, criminal history in Arkansas and Washington. Police confirmed that Clemmons had been shot in the abdomen during the attack, and advised hospitals to be aware.

In the late evening hours of November 29, Seattle police believed they had Clemmons surrounded in a home in the Leschi area of Seattle. With air support provided by King County Sheriff's Office, SWAT teams from the King County Sheriff's Office, Seattle Police Department, Tacoma Police Department, and other agencies entered the home after a twelve-hour standoff, but they found no one inside. Earlier in the day, Tacoma police served a search warrant on a Tacoma home belonging to a "person of interest" and collected evidence. An intense manhunt ensued, and police from agencies in Pierce and King counties conducted searches at the University of Washington campus, Rizal Park, and in Renton, without success. Acting on a tip, King County Sheriff's Deputies and Washington State Patrol troopers were also conducting surveillance and going door to door at Snoqualmie Pass-area homes, 50 miles (80 km) east of Seattle. After hours of investigating, that search was called off.

The tip had been one of thousands received by local law enforcement agencies. The police were offering a $145,000 reward for information leading to Clemmons's arrest.

=== Death of Clemmons ===
Clemmons evaded police for a little under two days.

At around 2:45 a.m. on December 1, Seattle police officer Benjamin L. Kelly was on patrol in the Brighton neighborhood of south Seattle in the Rainier Valley; he came upon a 1990 Acura Integra parked on the street at 44th Place South and South Kenyon Street. It was empty but the hood was raised and the engine running. He ran the vehicle's license plate number and determined that it had been stolen about two hours earlier. While sitting in his patrol car to report the stolen vehicle, Kelly noticed a man matching Clemmons' description approaching him from behind, walking first on the sidewalk and then in the middle of the street. Police accounts state that Kelly confronted Clemmons and ordered him to stop and show his hands, but Clemmons began to flee around the disabled vehicle and reportedly "reached into his waist area and moved" as Kelly was drawing his sidearm. Kelly fired three shots at Clemmons, followed by another four shots as the suspect ran away "in a dead sprint", and struck him at least twice.

Clemmons reached the sidewalk and collapsed face-down in a walkway leading to a home on Kenyon Street. Kelly retreated behind his patrol car, retrieved his shotgun, and called for backup. Within moments, Seattle police came to the scene. A team of officers approached the suspect, handcuffed him, and took him away from the home. Seattle Fire Department medics responded and pronounced the suspect dead at the scene. Clemmons was carrying a handgun identified as having belonged to a slain officer in the Lakewood shooting. Clemmons had a bullet wound to his abdomen sustained during the shooting in Parkland, which had been stuffed with cotton and gauze and sealed with duct tape.

== Victims ==
Location of Parkland in Pierce County.

All four officers had been with the Lakewood Police Department from its beginning in 2004. They were:

- Sergeant Mark Renninger, 39, thirteen years in law enforcement since 1996; died from a gunshot wound to the head.
- Officer Ronald Owens, 37, twelve years in law enforcement since 1997, from Puyallup; died from a gunshot wound to the neck.
- Officer Tina Griswold, 40, fourteen years of law enforcement since 1995; died from a gunshot wound to the head.
- Officer Greg Richards, 42, eight years of law enforcement experience since 2001, from Graham; died from a gunshot wound to the head.

=== Memorial funds raised, stolen ===
Immediately following the shootings, the Lakewood Police Independent Guild set up a memorial fund for the officers. As of 2012, about $3.2 million were donated to the fund. In March 2012, Lakewood police officer Skeeter Timothy Manos pleaded guilty to charges of stealing from the account, using funds for his personal use.

== Aftermath ==
=== Weapons ===
Federal authorities determined these details regarding the 9 mm Glock Model 17 and a Smith & Wesson .38-caliber revolver Clemmons brought to the crime scene:

- The Glock was purchased in June 2005 at a Renton, Washington pawnshop. The purchaser reported the gun stolen in March 2006, after his car was broken into at a downtown Seattle parking garage at Second Avenue and James Street.
- The Smith & Wesson revolver was shipped in 1981 to the (now-closed) Police Arms and Citizen Supply in Lakewood, Colorado, but no additional details were found.

=== Trials of accomplices ===
One accomplice has been convicted and sentenced to five years in prison, while four convicted of rendering criminal assistance, including getaway driver Darcus Allen, had their convictions reversed on appeal. The trials of accomplices to this crime were marred by prosecutorial misconduct, with many reversals and rebukes from higher courts. By December 2, 2009, six individuals were arrested charged with providing assistance to Clemmons before and after the shooting. Five were accused of providing such assistance to Clemmons as transporting him to several locations, providing him with money and cell phones, making arrangements for him to flee the state, and treating his gunshot wound from the Lakewood shooting, all with full knowledge of the crime he had committed. In June 2010, Clemmons's sister was sentenced to five years imprisonment for acting as a getaway driver. In December 2010, three of the four other suspects were convicted. On January 14, 2011, Pierce County Superior Court Judge Stephanie Arend sentenced accomplices Eddie Lee Davis to 10 years, five months, Douglas Edward Davis to seven years, six months, and Letrecia Nelson to six years, two months in state prison. One defendant was acquitted of all charges. All of these convictions and sentences were reversed by the Washington Supreme Court in appeals of 2013 and 2014 because of prosecutor misconduct in the original trials.

In May 2011, Darcus Allen, the remaining suspect, was convicted of four counts of murder as the getaway driver for Clemmons, and sentenced to 420 years in prison the following month. In January 2015, the Washington Supreme Court overturned his conviction and ordered a new trial, citing prosecutor misconduct similar to the earlier reversals. After being convicted in the retrial and sentenced, Allen's sentence was reversed on appeal. The high court ruled that Allen was acquitted of aggravated murder at his second trial, and could not be re-tried for aggravated murder. In response, the prosecutor's office re-tried him for first-degree murder. Allen maintains that he did not know Clemmons intended to commit a crime, and believes he has been a scapegoat for the public anguish and outrage evoked by the murders. After the second trial, the jury reported to the judge that they were unable to reach a verdict. The judge declared a mistrial on November 10, 2022.

In April 2023, Allen pleaded guilty to conspiracy to commit second degree murder and was sentenced to 10 years in prison. Since he'd already spent over 13 years in prison, he was immediately released after receiving credit for time served.

=== Political fallout ===
Mike Huckabee was widely criticized for having commuted Clemmons' sentence and allowed his release from prison in 2000. The evening of the shooting, Huckabee released a statement noting the roles of the parole board that freed him and the criminal justice system, which Huckabee said had repeatedly failed to properly handle Clemmons.

In his statement, Huckabee said, "Should he be found to be responsible for this horrible tragedy, it will be the result of a series of failures in the criminal justice system in both Arkansas and Washington State." Huckabee, who was considered a favorite for the Republican Party presidential nomination in 2012, claimed that the situation was used as a political weapon against him. Clemmons has been compared to Willie Horton, a convicted felon who was furloughed from a Massachusetts prison in 1986 but never returned and committed more violent crimes several months later. The Horton case eventually factored into the 1988 presidential campaign of Democratic Party candidate Michael Dukakis, who was Governor of Massachusetts at the time and supported the furlough program. Timothy Egan, opinion writer for The New York Times, said of Huckabee's role in Clemmons's release, "If this case does not sink the presidential aspirations of Huckabee [...] it should."

In his book about the shooting, The Other Side of Mercy, Jonathan Martin of The Seattle Times wrote that Huckabee apparently failed to review Clemmons' prison file, which was "thick with acts of violence and absent indications of rehabilitation". Martin also suggested that Huckabee failed to ensure Clemmons' post-release plan was "solid, or even factual". In an article for the Times, Martin wrote that if Huckabee was serious about running for president in 2016, "he'll have to answer his Maurice Clemmons problem."

Some university professors, criminologists, and attorneys speculated that U.S. governors will become more reluctant to grant pardons and clemencies to convicted felons, in order to avoid the negative publicity faced by Dukakis and Huckabee in the Horton and Clemmons cases, respectively.

=== Officers' memorial service ===
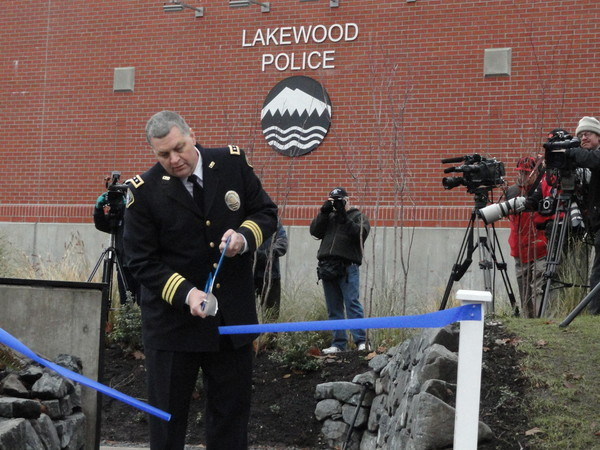

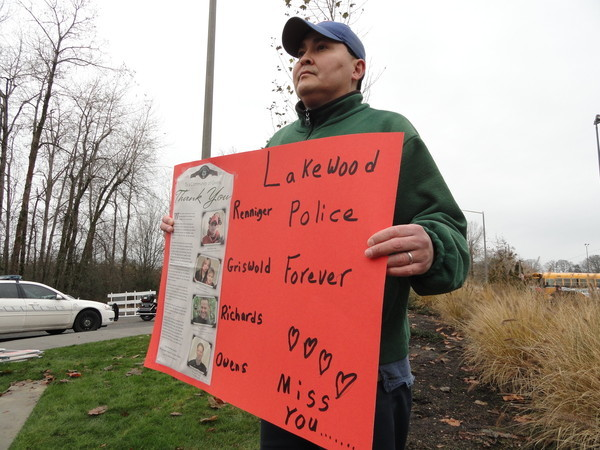
Above, Lakewood police Chief Bret Farrar commemorates the Lakewood Police Department Fallen Officer Memorial in 2010. Below, a man holds up a sign in honor of the victims at that commemoration ceremony.

A public memorial service for the four slain officers was held December 8, 2009, at the Tacoma Dome. The day began with a 10-mile (16 km) procession from McChord Air Force Base past the Lakewood police station to the Tacoma Dome. Over 2,000 police and fire vehicles from over 150 different law enforcement and fire agencies participated in the procession, which took five hours to complete. Over 20,000 people, mostly from the law enforcement, Emergency Medical Services and firefighting communities, attended the service at the Tacoma Dome. Police officers from as far away as New York City and Boston, as well as a large contingent of Royal Canadian Mounted Police Officers, NCOs and Constables, along with Officers and Paramedics from the British Columbia Ambulance Service were in attendance. Lakewood's mayor and police chief spoke, followed by eulogies by family, friends, and colleagues of the four officers. Washington Governor Christine Gregoire also spoke, saying, "We will remember them today. We will remember them always." The service concluded with a played recording of a police dispatcher attempting to call each officer with no response, and the dispatcher declaring each officer as "gone but not forgotten". The officers' remains were buried in private ceremonies by their individual families.

The memorial was logistically complex. The agencies preparing for the memorial services expected 20,000 law enforcement personnel to take part. One thousand emergency vehicles and police cruisers followed the families of the victims to the Tacoma Dome.

=== Site and memorial ===
The site of the murders reopened two weeks after the shooting. The business later changed ownership and became Blue Steele Coffee Company. A memorial to the slain officers appears near the site.

== See also ==
- List of American police officers killed in the line of duty
- Murder of Timothy Brenton
- 2009 shooting of Pittsburgh police officers
- 2009 shooting of Oakland police officers
