= StarCom21 =

StarCom21 is a statewide public safety trunked radio system in Illinois. Owned and operated by Motorola Solutions, the State of Illinois is a major partner in the system. It is used by all Illinois State Police posts and the Illinois State Toll Highway Authority (ISTHA) Maintenance and Police divisions.

== Users ==
Any public safety agency in the State of Illinois may apply to use the system. Most agencies would pay $53.00 per radio per month to operate on the system in addition to the cost of the radios. Those agencies with resources to share for the system, such as licensed radio channels or desirable tower space, may negotiate different costs with Motorola. Various grants and funding sources have allowed StarCom21 radios to be installed at many locations and provided to agencies for mutual aid purposes. These include radios offered to every police, fire, rescue, and EMA agency in the State, hospitals, central dispatch centers, and State and other colleges and universities.

StarCom21 Customer Users (those who pay a fee to use Motorola-owned infrastructure) include the Illinois State Police (21 posts) as well as other state agencies and:

- McLean County (and several local agencies dispatched by McLean's 9-1-1 system)
- The Illinois State Toll Highway Authority
- Boone County/Belvedere
- Rockford PD
- Macon County and Decatur PD
- Madison and Clinton Counties (and several agencies in these counties)
- Plainfield PD
- Sangamon County Sheriff and Springfield Police Department. Dispatched By Sangamon County Central Dispatch System SCCDS
- Whiteside County Sheriff's Office (and multiple local agencies dispatched by Whiteside County Sheriff's Office 9-1-1 system)
- Ameren, a large utility company operating in much of Illinois, also uses StarCom21. Ameren has operated several networked trunked systems, and these frequencies have largely been turned over to StarCom21 for general subscriber use. Since the 700 MHz band is restricted to Public Safety users, Ameren can only use the 800 MHz channels, so some sites that previously only had 700 MHz channels have had 800 MHz channels added to allow Ameren access. This has permitted StarCom21 access to additional radio channels and tower sites.

Several other agencies and localities have expressed interest in or tried the system.

StarCom21 Partner Users (Those who own their compatible infrastructure under the same System ID and have roaming agreements for StarCom21) include:

- St. Clair County
- McHenry County
- Cook County (Most operations are encrypted)

StarCom21 Affiliated Systems (Those who own similar infrastructure under a separate System ID) include:

- Champaign County

The so-called Affiliated Systems include the same type of technology, and system parameters (Talkgroup and user IDs, etc.) are coordinated with StarCom21 to allow roaming and interoperability. Several other agencies are considering building or upgrading to similar or compatible systems to enable roaming on the various systems. Those making these considerations include Cook County, DuPage County, and others.

== Technical ==
StarCom21 uses about 186 radio towers throughout Illinois, many owned by state agencies. It uses radio channels in the 700 and 800 MHz bands, all licensed to the State of Illinois. It uses APCO-25 9600 baud control channel frequencies and APCO-25 digital modulation.

== Trunked Radio ==
Using the trunked radio system technology that shares and reuses radio channels, the system can handle thousands of individual Talkgroups and radio IDs. Since most radios only transmit a small percentage of the time, the channels are shared among many users. The same radio frequency may be used at many sites throughout the state. Of the many individual tower sites, simulcast groups cover the Chicago, St. Louis, Peoria and Rockford metro areas. These simulcast sites allow for better coverage over a large area by transmitting the same conversation on the same frequencies at each tower in the simulcast site.
