= Murder of Timothy Brenton =

Murder of a law enforcement officer in Seattle, Washington

- Location: Seattle, Washington, U.S.
- Date: October 31, 2009; 10:00 p.m. (UTC-8)
- Attack type: Ambush shooting
- Weapons: .223-caliber Kel-Tec SU-16 semi-automatic rifle; 9mm Glock semi-automatic handgun
- Deaths: 1
- Injuries: 2 (including the perpetrator)
- Perpetrator: Chris Monfort

The murder of Timothy Brenton occurred on October 31, 2009, in the Central District of Seattle, Washington, United States. Timothy Quinn Brenton (February 9, 1970 – October 31, 2009), an officer with the Seattle Police Department (SPD), was seated in a parked patrol car with another officer discussing a traffic stop when a gunman stopped his vehicle alongside the patrol car, opened fire on both officers, and fled the scene. Brenton died at the scene and his partner sustained minor injuries. One week later, as a public memorial service for Brenton was being held at KeyArena, the gunman was seriously wounded and apprehended after being shot by police officers in Tukwila.

The shooting is believed to have been a targeted attack against police officers in general, not against either officer individually. The suspect arrested in connection with the murder, Chris Monfort, was also charged in connection with the October 22, 2009, firebombing of Seattle police vehicles at a city maintenance facility. No clear motive was established, but he had left behind fliers discussing police brutality, and had expressed opinions against the wars in Iraq and Afghanistan. He was accused by authorities of being a terrorist who waged a "one-man war" against the police. Monfort likened police to British Redcoats and himself to Minutemen, believed that citizens must rebel against tyranny, and believed that his actions were legal under the United States Constitution.

== Victims ==
One Seattle Police Department (SPD) officer was killed and another injured. They were:

- Field Training Officer Timothy Brenton, 39, of Marysville, who had served nine years with the SPD. Brenton, he previously served as a police officer in La Conner, Washington, and was a United States Army veteran of the Gulf War, was killed in the attack. He graduated from West Seattle High School and Spokane Community College and had two children.
- Trainee Officer Britt Sweeney, 33, of Seattle, having one month with the SPD, was injured in the attack.

== Incident ==
On the night of October 31, 2009, at approximately 10:00 pm Pacific Daylight Time (UTC-7), Brenton and his partner, trainee officer Britt Sweeney, were sitting in their patrol car following a traffic stop at 29th Avenue South and East Yesler Way in the Central District. Sweeney was sitting in the driver's seat with Brenton in the passenger seat. As they were discussing the traffic stop they had just performed, a vehicle pulled up alongside their police car and someone inside opened fire with a rifle. Sweeney ducked, and a bullet grazed the top of her head and her back. Brenton, meanwhile, was mortally wounded in the attack. The suspect's vehicle reversed, turned around, and fled the scene in the direction from which it had come. As the vehicle was fleeing the scene, Sweeney managed to call for help, exit the patrol car, and return fire.

Seattle's police chief called the attack an assassination, as well as an act of domestic terrorism. Several days after the shooting, a suspicious vehicle was identified as having been seen on dashboard cameras of other police vehicles in the area of the shooting.

A public memorial service was held for Brenton on November 6. The memorial began with a procession of police and fire vehicles from the University of Washington campus to KeyArena, where a public ceremony was held. As the ceremony was concluding, officers with the Seattle and Tukwila police departments and King County Sheriff's Office confronted Christopher Monfort, age 41, the owner of a vehicle matching the description of the suspicious vehicle in the parking lot of a Tukwila apartment complex. Monfort brandished a 9mm Glock handgun and attempted to flee into his apartment. When he brandished the weapon again, the pursuing officers opened fire, seriously wounding him. Monfort was taken to Harborview Medical Center and his family has stated that he was paralyzed from the waist down.

== Perpetrator ==
The shooter was identified as Christopher John Monfort (1968 – January 18, 2017). At the time of the incidents, Monfort had no criminal record in Washington, and had graduated from Highline Community College and the University of Washington and studied law enforcement.

Police said that upon entering Monfort's apartment, they found three rifles (a 7mm Winchester Model 70 bolt-action rifle, an FN Model 1949 semi-automatic rifle and a 7.62x39mm Inter Ordnance of America M59/66 semi-automatic rifle w/ fixed bayonet), a Mossberg 590 12-gauge shotgun, a .45-caliber Auto-Ordnance 1911 pistol, homemade explosives, booby traps and a barricade of tires. Investigators also matched ballistics between a rifle found in Monfort's apartment and the bullets used in the attack on Brenton and Sweeney. They also found evidence connecting Monfort with the firebombing of multiple police vehicles at a Seattle city maintenance facility on October 22, 2009, in which prosecutors claim he was planning to kill police officers. Police also claim to have a DNA match for Monfort found on the flags left at the firebombing scene and the murder scene.

On June 5, 2015, Monfort was convicted of murder, two counts of attempted murder, and one count of arson by a King County jury. He was sentenced to life in prison. He died in prison of an amitriptyline overdose on January 18, 2017, at the age of 48.

== See also ==
- 2009 shootings of Oakland police officers
- 2009 shooting of Pittsburgh police officers
- 2009 Lakewood shooting
