= Roll call (policing) =

Meeting at the beginning or end of a police shift

In police jargon, a roll call is a briefing "where supervisors take attendance, inspect uniform and equipment, inform the oncoming shift of any outstanding incidents that may have occurred, inform officers of suspects to be looking out for, relate any law or procedural changes, and so on."

Although often conducted prior to the start of a shift, a roll call may be held at the end of a shift as well. The communication at a roll call is usually top-down, with information disseminated by (or at the direction of) a shift or squad commander. The roll call is just one of several vehicles for intra-departmental communication in law enforcement agencies: other modes include command or administrative staff meetings, quality circles, and unit meetings.

Roll calls are "usually limited to recent events or items that might be of short-term interest" and so usually "do not allow for the in-depth discussions necessary for community policing or real problem-solving.

In 1992, the Independent Commission on the Los Angeles Police Department reported that Los Angeles Police Department patrol officers at the time "start each day with roll call that lasts approximately 45 minutes to an hour ... A portion of each roll call (usually 20 minutes or less) is devoting to training. Typical roll call training involves the watch commander lecturing to the officers. Many watch commanders simply read the department's policy on a given topic without any discussion of the practical application of that policy in the field.
