= Nottingham City Police =

Former UK police force

Nottingham City Police, originally founded as the Borough of Nottingham Police, was a UK police force created under the Municipal Corporations Act 1835 in the style of Robert Peel's Metropolitan Police which initially launched in 1836. This initial force failed and was re-founded successfully in 1841. It had responsibility for law enforcement within the geographic area as defined by the boundaries of the city of Nottingham. Under the Police Act 1964 the force was compulsorily amalgamated with Nottinghamshire County Police to form the Nottinghamshire Combined Constabulary, now renamed Nottinghamshire Police.

== Founding and early history ==
The force was founded originally in 1836 with a body of three police officers working days and 12 police officers working evenings. The previously existing system of night watchmen was retained for the hours of darkness. The force operated under the existing High Constable William Barnes who had held the traditional position of authority in the borough since 1833. The force failed after five years, with internal rivalries between the different shifts and general incompetence on the parts of the watchmen leading to its lack of efficiency.

Trips by the town's authorities to neighbouring Derby to observe their new police force in action prompted the Nottingham Corporation to disband the force baring the three 'day police' officers. They re-launched a new force in 1841 with 47 officers, including an Inspector and 12 Constables for the day and four Inspectors and 30 Constables for nights. When this force hit the beat they were far more successful.

The force was further reviewed in 1851 and expanded to two Inspectors, five Sergeants and 53 Constables. It would also now have a Superintendent “who shall have no other duties than the management of the Police Force”. Supt. William Reddish was appointed at a salary of £150 plus house and coal. William Barnes retained his position as High Constable but had no more involvement with running the force. The review also introduced a Criminal Investigation Department to the force for the first time.

== List of Chief Constables ==
List of Chief Constables:

List of Chief Constables
Name	Dates of holding position	Post title	Notes
William Barnes	1833 1851	High Constable	1833 - traditional pre-existing post 1851 replaced as Chief Officer but retained honorary High Constable title
William Reddish	1851 1854	Superintendent	
William Raynor	1854 1860	Superintendent	
Joseph Hedington	1860 1869	Chief Constable	
Capt F Parry	1869 1872	Chief Constable	
Maj. William H Poyntz	1872 1881	Chief Constable	Wrote biography Per Mare Per Terram: Reminiscences of Thirty-Two Years Military, naval, and Constabulary Service
Samuel Stevens	1881 1892	Chief Constable	Previously chief constable of: Chesterfield 1864 - 1868 Derbyshire Constabulary Rochdale 1869 - 1881 South Yorkshire Police
Philip Stephens Clay	1892 1912	Chief Constable	Author of Borough of Nottingham Police Instructions
Thomas Clarke	1912 1920	Chief Constable	
Lt Col. Frank Brook DSO, MC	1920 1929	Chief Constable	
Capt Athelstan Popkes CBE, OStJ, KPM	1930 1959	Chief Constable	
Thomas Moore	1960 1968	Chief Constable	

== The Popkess Era ==
Between 1930 and 1959, the Nottingham City Police force was run by Chief Constable Capt Athelstan Popkess. During this period it made advancements in police technology and was recognised as an example to follow in other areas.

Popkess was responsible for introducing several innovations to the police, including introducing the first police forensic science laboratory in the UK located at Nottingham's Central Police Station. The force also pioneered the use of police radios through the Mechanised Division, as early as 1931, achieving two-way communications with patrolling police cars several years before any other force.

During this era the force was famed for having very stringent height requirements significantly above other forces. Two officers PC Geoffrey Baker and PC Dennis 'Tug' Wilson were 'headhunted' specifically based on their height after being spotted by Popkess when they were Grenadier Guards acting as pallbearers at the funeral of King George VI. They stood at 6 foot 8 and 6 foot 8 1/2 respectively.

== Amalgamation ==
On 1 April 1968 as a result of the Police Act 1964 the force was required to amalgamate with the surrounding County police force and the forces took the name Nottinghamshire Combined Constabulary. This later changed to Nottinghamshire Constabulary and then Nottinghamshire Police.
