= Meir Weinstein =

Canadian Kahanist activist

- Born: Marvin Weinstein; August 18, 1957 (age 69)
- Other name: Meir Halevi
- Occupations: Glazier, business owner
- Years active: 1979–present
- Organization(s): Jewish Defense League (1979–2021); Kach (1990s); Israel Now (2021–present)
- Known for: National director of the Canadian branch of the Jewish Defense League, Kahanist activism

Marvin Weinstein (born August 18, 1957) known as Meir Weinstein and previously known as Meir Halevi is the former national director of the Canadian branch of the Jewish Defense League (JDL) and in 2017 claimed to also be the leader of the JDL in North America. He announced on July 9, 2021, that he was leaving the JDL.

== Background ==
Weinstein had been leader of the Canadian JDL since 1979, used the pseudonym "Meir Halevi" into the 1990s. He joined the JDL at the age of 20, after reading Meir Kahane's book Never Again. Previously an assimilated Jew, Weinstein began attending synagogue regularly, began studying Jewish texts and became more involved in the Jewish community as a result of reading Kahane's book. He founded the Toronto JDL branch in 1979. He told the Jewish Press in 2008: "I will always be a loyal disciple of Rabbi Kahane. Our ideology is based on the Jewish Idea as taught by Rabbi Kahane." Under his leadership, the Canadian JDL has held annual commemorations honoring Kahane's life and ideas.

In 1980, Weinstein visited Israel for the first time. During his stay in Kiryat Arba, he had planned on visiting Beit Hadassah with a group of Jewish students and worshippers. Weinstein's plans fell through at the last minute and he did not join them. Later that evening, the Jewish group fell victim to a terror attack, known as the 1980 Hebron attack. Weinstein noted the Arab population was rejoicing at the terror attack, which he escaped by chance.

In the 1980s and early 1990s, Weinstein and the JDL were involved in identifying alleged Nazi war criminals living in Canada as well as neo-Nazi activity. The group became dormant until Weinstein revived it in 2006 in the wake of the 2006 Israel-Hezbollah war. The revived JDL has focused on opposing what it views as growing radical Islamic influence and anti-Israel activity.

Weinstein is a trained bodyguard and served in the Israel Defense Forces. Professionally, Weinstein owns a window-installing business.

== In Alberta ==
In the mid-1980s, Weinstein travelled to Alberta on several occasions in an attempt to organize the Jewish community against antisemitic activity in the province - particularly, against the activities of Aryan Nations organizer Terry Long. He received national media attention in 1986 when he picketed "AryanFest" when it was held on Long's Alberta compound. The previous year, Weinstein had held meetings in Edmonton in an attempt to organize a JDL branch there. During one of the meetings he shouted down Rabbi Haim Kemelman, leader of Edmonton's Beth Shalom synagogue, after he criticized the JDL's methods and called Weinstein a "carpetbagger" and alleged he was trumping up a non-existent crisis of antisemitism in an attempt create an Edmonton JDL branch. "Those kinds of rabbis, those kind of Jews, in the end they dig a grave for Jews," said Weinstein who accused the rabbi of being "rude and extremist". "You see, I am silenced," the rabbi was reported as saying to a reporter after the incident, adding, "that is the JDL".

In 1986, an editorial in The Globe and Mail criticized Weinstein (under his pseudonym of Meir Halevi) for claiming that the Alberta government was aiding neo-nazi Terry Long: "to say, as Mr. Halevi does, that this group exists with the assistance of the provincial government is simply a lie. And to advocate, as he does, any means legal or illegal to destroy the Aryan Nations group is irresponsible".

== On Baruch Goldstein ==
In 1994, using his pseudonym of Meir Halevi, Weinstein commented on the Cave of the Patriarchs massacre committed by Baruch Goldstein in Hebron saying "[a]s long as the Arab public celebrates every attack on a Jew, our organization does not condemn the attack. It condemns the Israeli government for not providing adequate protection for settlers." He added that Kach does not advocate physical attacks on Palestinians but that it wants all members of terrorist organizations expelled from Israel.

== Ernst Zündel ==
In May 1995 Meir Weinstein and US JDL leader Irv Rubin were caught and apprehended by police while trying to break into the property of Ernst Zündel, a Holocaust denier. No charges have ever been laid in the incident.

== Protest at Palestine House ==
In 2002, during the Canadian JDL's inactive period, Weinstein organized another group called the United Israel Action Committee which organized two demonstrations outside of Palestine House in Mississauga, Ontario. At the second demonstration the pro-Palestinian counterdemonstrators were joined by 20 children. Palestine House president Rashad Saleh said the demonstrators "should be the ones who should be ashamed. (They) are coming here and terrorizing our little children." Weinstein argued that the children had been brought out as "pawns" by Palestine House and claimed that the organization his group was picketing used its charitable status to fund the Palestine Liberation Organization. "The people standing across the street are those who support the murders of Jews," said Weinstein to a reporter.

== 2007 Newmarket mosque dispute ==
In 2007, Weinstein helped organize a town hall session to raise questions about the connections of a mosque in Newmarket, Ontario with Zafar Bangash. The controversial imam has promoted sharia law and vigorously defended Iran's fundamentalist regime and Lebanon's Hezbollah movement. The mosque spokesperson denied that Bangash will have anything to do with the day-to-day running of the mosque.

The meeting was criticized as "one-sided" because no officials from the mosque were invited. John Thompson, president of the Mackenzie Institute, was one of the featured speakers at the town hall. He told the Toronto Star that he was invited by Ron Banerjee, one of the organizers, but would have "called in with the flu" had he known Weinstein would be there because of his association with the JDL.

Weinstein found himself on the defensive at the meeting, according to the National Post, after he implied that a town councillor had accepted a bribe. Newmarket resident Brian Patterson said of Weinstein: "I don't think he has any credibility at all. To suggest at a public meeting that any public official in this town has taken a bribe without any evidence of that is outrageous."

In his arguments against the mosque, Weinstein told the audience of about 30, "[i]f, God forbid, an Islamic state ever came to fruition in this country, we would be doomed. Is that what you want in this country?"

== Clash with Paul Fromm ==
A 2007 demonstration against Paul Fromm while he was on his way to a disciplinary hearing at the Ontario College of Teachers resulted in the arrest of two JDL activists who were accused of assaulting the controversial far-right figure. Weinstein, himself, was not reported to have been involved in the incident. He told the Globe and Mail that the arrests were "not going to be a setback for us and we're determined to see to it that Nazis will not teach hate in classrooms."

== George Galloway ==
In 2009, Weinstein's JDL issued an "open letter" to the Canadian government calling for the British politician George Galloway to be barred from entering Canada. The government did so and Weinstein appeared on Britain's Channel 4 News to debate with Galloway over the issue. During the interview, Weinstein accused Galloway of being a "proxy agent" of Hamas and Hezbollah. When Galloway stated that he would be speaking in Canada through "other means", electronic if necessary, Weinstein threatened that "we will see to it that the Canadian government will be monitoring every individual and organization that will have anything to do with it" and that he and the JDL "will be looking into these organizations that invited him… their links to terror groups as well" and that he will "see to it that the Canadian Government will be monitoring every individual and organization that has anything to do with George Galloway".

== "Death to the Arabs" ==
On April 3, 2009, CBC Radio's The World Report carried a profile on Weinstein which asserted that a link was discovered on Weinstein's Facebook page to a chat group called "Death to Arabs". Weinstein, who does not speak Hebrew, told CBC the link had been sent to him in Hebrew and he added it not knowing what it said.

== English Defence League ==
In 2011, Weinstein's Jewish Defence League organized a "support rally" for the controversial English Defence League featuring a live speech, via Skype, by EDL leader Stephen Yaxley-Lennon, who uses the alias Tommy Robinson. The event was denounced by the Canadian Jewish Congress whose leader, Bernie Farber, said he was "disappointed that the JDL would support an organization whose record in the U.K. is one of violence and extremism." "We join with all the leading British Jewish organizations in condemning the intolerance and violence that the EDL represents. It has never been the Canadian way to promote vigilantism," added Farber. In an opinion piece published following the event, Farber and CJC general counsel Benjamin Shinewald castigated the JDL stating that, "By joining forces [with the English Defence League], the JDL condones the indefensible actions of violent extremists."

The rally, held at the Toronto Zionist Centre, attracted a counter-protest organized by Anti-Racist Action resulting in four arrests.

== RCMP investigate JDL Canada for alleged bomb plot ==
On October 5, 2011, on the Michael Coren show it was revealed that the Royal Canadian Mounted Police had launched an investigation against at least nine members of the Canadian JDL in regards to an anonymous tip that the JDL was plotting to bomb Palestine House in Mississauga. Meir Weinstein reported that many members of the JDL were interviewed extensively, at home and at work and suggested that the RCMP was surveilling their activity. Weinstein denied that the plot existed and accused the RCMP of political bias.

== Violence outside Washington DC AIPAC conference ==
Weinstein organized a group of JDL members and supporters to go to Washington, D.C. in March 2017 to counter-protest against anti-Zionist groups protesting the annual American Israel Public Affairs Committee (AIPAC) conference, resulting in several brawls. At least two Canadian JDL supporters have been indicted as a result of alleged violence outside the conference. Yosef Steynovitz was charged with one count of assaulting a man with a dangerous weapon, one count of assaulting a second man, and one count of assault with a hate crimes enhancement for causing significant bodily injury in relation to the beating of Kamal Nayfeh, a 55-year-old Palestinian-American community college teacher who was reportedly walking to the conference when he was attacked. Rami Lubranicki, 59, of Howell, New Jersey was also charged. On April 20, 2018, a second Canadian JDL supporter, Brandon David William Vaughan, was arraigned in relation with the Washington D.C. assaults the previous year. Weinstein claimed that his members acted in "self-defence" saying of the beating victims "They found out that it’s not wise to lay not even a finger on any of us. Anyone who’s going to try and raise a fist to us, push us and assault us, we would be glad to enforce a citizen's arrest when there’s some semblance of cooperation from the aggressor. Unfortunately, we had to resort to a certain level of force, and we made it very clear the days of Jews being attacked and being docile are long over." However, there is no evidence that the victims had engaged in any form of violence.

== Departure from JDL ==
In July 2021, several weeks after the JDL was involved in a melee with Palestinian activists following a pro-Palestinian rally, Weinstein dissociated himself from the JDL and formed a new organization called Israel Now.
