= 2001 Jewish Defense League plot in California =

Terrorist plot

In late 2001, the Jewish Defense League (JDL) plotted to bomb the King Fahd mosque in Culver City, California, along with the office of California Republican Congressman Darrell Issa.

In November 2001 the JDL's leader Irv Rubin and its West Coast co-ordinator Earl Krugel were arrested as part of a sting operation after an FBI informant named Danny Gillis delivered explosives to Krugel's home in Los Angeles. Bomb components including pipes, end caps, detonators and gunpowder were confiscated along with multiple rifles and handguns. In December 2001 Krugel and Rubin were arraigned on conspiracy charges to send explosives to the Sherman Oaks, California office of U.S. congressman Darrell Issa, a Lebanese-American, and to bomb the King Fahd Mosque in Culver City, California. According to the affidavit in support of the charges, Krugel had stated to an FBI informant that "Arabs needed a wake-up call and the JDL needed to do something to one of their 'filthy mosques'." According to the San Francisco Chronicle the affidavit also "painted a picture of a tiny gang that sat around talking about what to blow up but generally shied away from blowing up people."

In 2003 the bombing charges were dropped and Krugel was allowed to plead guilty to reduced charges of conspiracy to violate civil rights, and to a weapons charge. U.S. District Court Judge Ronald S.W. Lew accepted the plea.. Part of the plea agreement demanded that Krugel reveal the names of all JDL activists involved in the 1985 bombing of Alex Odeh's office. The plea agreement was later retracted with details sealed to the public. He was sentenced to 20 years in prison in September 2005, and three days later he was murdered by another inmate, who struck him in the head with a concrete block.
