= Abdeen Jabara =

American attorney

Abdeen Jabara is an American attorney. Jabara was President of the American-Arab Anti-Discrimination Committee. Jabara is a longtime leader of the National Lawyers Guild. In the mid-1970s, he exposed the Nixon Administration's “Operation Boulder” surveillance program against Arabs and Arab Americans. He was subject to a campaign of government surveillance, and in 1985 won a legal battle which forced the FBI to destroy the records on him because his activities were protected by the first amendment.
