= Chaim Ben Pesach =

Convicted Jewish–American terrorist

- חיים בן פסח
- Born: December 25, 1956 (age 69); United States
- Occupation: Political activist

Victor Vancier (born December 25, 1956), commonly referred to by his Hebrew name, Chaim Ben Pesach (Hebrew: חיים בן פסח) or as Chaim Ben Yosef is an American political activist and the founder and director of the United States–based Kahanist organization, Jewish Task Force (JTF) and the former National Chairman of the Jewish Defense League (JDL) in the United States. In 1987, he was convicted on charges related to a series of terrorist bombings conducted during his time with the JDL to protest Soviet treatment of Jews. He served five and a half years in federal prison for his involvement in 18 bombings in New York and Washington.

== Activities and imprisonment ==
Pesach was the National Chairman of the Jewish Defense League, but resigned in December 1978 after he went to jail for bombing Egyptian targets in an effort to stop the Israeli withdrawal from the Sinai Peninsula. After his release and upon the completion of his probation in July 1983, Meir Kahane again appointed Pesach to be National Chairman of the JDL.

On May 8, 1987, Pesach was arrested along with Jay Cohen and Sharon Katz in relation to multiple bombings in New York, including a tear gas attack on a performance of the Moiseyev Dance Company, after an anonymous former member of the JDL cooperated with police to capture them. He said he did this in the hopes of influencing the Soviet Union to allow Jewish emigration. Pesach's court-appointed lawyer Thomas Concannon said that it is "fair to say he's a little bit nuts". The judge Israel Leo Glasser regarded Pesach as "a danger to this community". One of his accomplices, 24-year-old Jay Cohen, committed suicide after facing a possible maximum prison sentence of 20 years. Pesach said at that time that he felt personally responsible for Cohen's death. The JDL, as overseen by Pesach, is also believed to be responsible for the 1982 fire set at the Tripoli Restaurant on Atlantic Avenue in Brooklyn, New York, which destroyed it, killing one person and injuring seven. An anonymous caller claiming to represent the JDL telephoned news organizations to take credit for the arson, justifying the attack by stating the restaurant was the undercover headquarters in New York City of the Palestine Liberation Organization, though JDL officials denied having any involvement in the attack. He served five and a half years for the bombings.

== Jewish Task Force ==
Pesach is the current head of the Jewish Task Force, a Kahanist organization in the United States. Pesach created JTF in 1991. The Jewish Task Force raises money for the claimed purpose of funding Jewish settlers in the West Bank and runs a website with the stated goal of saving Israel, the United States, and the West. Pesach is banned from entering Israel because of his terrorist acts and his Kahanist associations, which are outlawed in Israel. The Jewish Task Force is considered a hate group by the Southern Poverty Law Center.

The Jewish Task Force program aired on public access television in the mid-1990s, in Manhattan, Brooklyn, and Queens. Pesach became known for his criticisms of African American culture that included resorting to racial slurs and offensive stereotypes, as well as his views on homosexuality, and he was criticized in local magazines and newspapers as a result. During the 1994 New York State Comptroller election, while Pesach extolled Herbert London as "a real Jewish man", he derided London's opponent, African American Carl McCall, as "a low, Jew-hating, Jew-killing cockroach". He further described attorney general candidate Karen Burstein as a "disgusting, ugly lesbian" and continued:

The God of Israel will not tolerate homosexuality or lesbianism. It is an abomination onto the Lord... I have a cure for AIDS that doesn't cost one penny. Stop being fags!

Pesach has described Baruch Goldstein, who perpetrated the 1994 Cave of the Patriarchs massacre, as "a great hero".

Pesach has referred to Nelson Mandela as a "Black Nazi", Yasser Arafat as the "Arab Hitler" and a "Muslim terrorist pedophile who died of AIDS". He has also targeted former First Lady and senator Hillary Clinton and former U.S. President George W. Bush on his website, calling Clinton "Hillary Sodom Arafat" and Bush "Jorge Wahabi Bush" whom he calls a "low, disgusting traitor" and "excrement". He also uses language such as schvartze when referring to African Americans and "kike" for Jews he considers to be traitors. JTF's messages have been condemned for "racism" by the Anti-Defamation League.

== See also ==
- Domestic terrorism in the United States
