= Shelley Rubin =

American Jewish activist

- Employer: Jewish Defense League
- Known for: Rubin v. City of Lancaster, a prayer lawsuit
- Title: Chairman & CEO
- Term: 2006–present
- Predecessor: Irv Rubin
- Spouse: Irv Rubin (deceased)

Shelley Rubin is the widow of JDL International Chairman Irv Rubin, and is currently the chairman and CEO of the US-based, Kahanist, Jewish Defense League, a group which was classified as "a right-wing terrorist group" by the FBI in 2001.

== Biography ==
Rubin is Jewish, resides in California, and is the widow of JDL International Chairman Irv Rubin. She is also the chairman and CEO of the USA-based, Kahanist, Jewish Defense League, a group which was classified as "a right-wing terrorist group" by the FBI in 2001. She is responsible for ideological and strategic direction, organizational development, activities coordination, and daily administration of the JDL.

She has been a member of the JDL since 1979, and from 1985–2006 was Administrative Director (primarily under the leadership of her husband, late JDL International Chairman Irv Rubin), and has been chairman and CEO since 2006.

In 1980, she was arrested during a scuffle at a Jimmy Carter rally, as she carried a Reagan-Bush poster.

In 1988, she was editor of the B'nai B'rith Messenger.

In 2002, after her husband's death she called for an investigation, saying he would not have committed suicide.

=== Lancaster City Council Prayer lawsuit ===
She and Maureen Feller filed suit in 2010 in Los Angeles Superior Court to try to stop the City of Lancaster City Council sessions from including a Christian prayer. She described the use of the prayer by Rev. Martin Brauer as "showing a lack of respect for every American who doesn't share his brand of religion". She filed the suit three weeks after Lancaster voters supported a ballot vote to allow the prayers. The case was assigned to Los Angeles Superior Court Judge Susan Bryant-Deason.

The City removed the case to federal court. In June 2011, Judge Dale S. Fischer of the U.S. Central District Court found against her and her co-plaintiff in a bench trial.

Rubin appealed the case. In March 2013, a three-judge panel of the U.S. Court of Appeals for the Ninth Circuit, including District Judge Jack Zouhary, and Circuit Judges Alfred T. Goodwin and Diarmuid F. O’Scannlain, affirmed the district court ruling against her, upholding Lancaster’s prayer policy as not affecting an unconstitutional establishment of religion.

== Depictions ==
Rubin is depicted in the documentary film Mother with a Gun, which won Best Australian Documentary at the 2016 Antenna Documentary Film Festival and was selected for the documentary film festival, DOC NYC.
