= Tscherim Soobzokov =

Waffen SS officer (1924–1985)

Personal details
- Born: 24 August 1924 Takhtamukay, Russian Soviet Federative Socialist Republic, Soviet Union
- Died: 6 September 1985 (aged 61) Paterson, New Jersey, United States
- Citizenship: Soviet Union, Nazi Germany, United States
- Children: Aslan Soobzokov
- Occupation: SS Officer, Politician, Spy
- Nickname: Tom Soobzokov

Military service
- Allegiance: Nazi Germany
- Branch/service: Schutzstaffel
- Years of service: 1943-45
- Rank: SS-Obersturmführer
- Battles/wars: World War II

Tscherim "Tom" Soobzokov (Adyghe: Щэбзыхъуэ Чэрим, romanized: Şəbzıxhwə Çərim; Russian: Черим Сообцоков, romanized: Cherim Soobtsokov; 24 August 1924 – 6 September 1985) was a Circassian spy, American politician, SS Obersturmführer, and Nazi fugitive. He rose to prominence in the New Jersey Democratic Party and the Circassian community in Paterson, New Jersey. During the Cold War, Soobzokov served the CIA as an anti-Soviet operative.

Soobzokov came to national attention in the United States with the publication of Howard Blum's Wanted! The Search for Nazis in America in 1977, and his subsequent appearance on PBS NewsHour. He was accused of collaborating with Nazi Germany during the invasion of the Soviet Union's North Caucasus before coming to the U.S. In 1985, Soobzokov was murdered by a pipe bomb at his house. The Jewish Defense League claimed responsibility for the murder. He was publicly supported by Pat Buchanan and New Jersey Congressman Robert Roe.

== Biography ==
Tscherim Soobzokov was born August 24, 1924, in Takhtamukay, Russian Soviet Federative Socialist Republic. In some documents, Soobzokov listed his year of birth as either 1918 or 1921, although these were most likely lies.

In 1940, Soobzokov was arrested and deported to a prison camp in the Lithuanian SSR, after its annexation by the Soviet Union, for either hooliganism (Soobzokov claimed it had been for "throwing a rock at a judge") or embezzling farm tax funds. In 1941, after his release, Soobzokov returned back home to Takhtamukay in the Caucasus, and Nazi Germany invaded the Soviet Union soon afterwards. The Germans occupied the Caucasus in mid-1942.

In August 1942, during the German occupation of the Caucasus, Tscherim Soobzokov was recruited by an SS or SD officer as chief of Nazi police in Takhtamukay. In 1943–1944 Soobzokov served as a military recruiter for the Nazis, and in early 1945, he was promoted to the rank of Obersturmführer in the Waffen-SS.

After the end of the war, Soobzokov went into hiding in Italy; assured that the Vatican protected Nazi fugitives, Soobzokov remained there until 1947, when, with the aid of the Italian Red Cross and donations from Jordan, a group of 67 Circassian Nazi fugitives made their way to Jordan. One of the Circassians who had journeyed on the same ship from Italy to Jordan later accused Soobzokov of trying to defraud the other passengers and stealing silverware from the ship's dining room.

In 1950, Soobzokov was first approached for employment by the CIA. Soobzokov was admitted into the United States in 1955. Soobzokov settled in Paterson, New Jersey and became a naturalized US citizen in 1961. Official accusations against Soobzokov started in 1969, when a fellow immigrant named Mahamet Perchich, who had known Soobzokov in Jordan, wrote a letter to the Immigration and Naturalization Service, claiming Soobzokov had bragged about murdering Jews during the war. In 1972, the Social Security Administration began investigating Soobzokov based on reports of his participation in a Social Security fraud scheme. Despite the investigation and accusations against him in Paterson's tight-knit Circassian community, Soobzokov rose through the local political ranks, becoming a Democratic party apparatchik, serving as vice chairman of the Paterson Zoning Board, and eventually being appointed Chief Purchasing Inspector of Passaic County, New Jersey.

Accusations against Soobzokov came to national attention in 1977 with the publication of Howard Blum's exposé of Nazi war criminal residing in the U.S., Wanted! The Search for Nazis in America. Both Blum and Soobzokov appeared on the February 2, 1977, episode of the PBS NewsHour The MacNeil/Lehrer Report. In the program, Soobzokov admitted that "I wore that uniform, but I never was any official. I never was in any service by the so-called Waffen-S.S.," and denied working for the CIA after WWII. Both statements would subsequently be shown to be false by Soobzokov's own defense lawyers in his 1979 denaturalization trial, when they produced secret CIA documents where Soobzokov admitted to serving in the Waffen-SS.

In 1979, the Office of Special Investigations opened a denaturalization case against Soobzokov. In July 1980, the OSI withdrew its suit after the CIA shared with investigators a copy of Soobzokov's State Department Form V-30, which confirmed his claims he had disclosed service with the North Caucasian Legion and the Waffen SS when applying for his US immigration visa in Amman.

Soobzokov sued Blum's publisher, Quadrangle Books (a division of the New York Times Company) for libel in 1977. After the deportation case against Soobzokov was dropped, the publisher decided to settle the suit for $450,000 before trial. A trove of classified CIA documents released in 2006 under the Nazi War Crimes Disclosure Act contained admissions by Soobzokov that validated witness testimony taken from survivors in the 1970s, and vindicated Blum's research.

== War crimes ==
The first documented evidence of Soobzokov's involvement in war crimes comes from reports made in 1943, after the Nazis had been driven from the North Caucasus. Soobzokov was implicated in the abduction and murder of Bachir Tlekhuch and Valeghei Skhazhok by Tlekhuch's father, and by one Soobzokov's colleagues in the Nazi Punitive Detachment. Further testimony gathered in 1976 from surviving Nazi collaborators who had served with Soobzokov confirmed his participation in raids and executions in the auls (villages) of Edepsukai-1, Edepsukai-2, and Dzhidzkhihabl. Even Soobzokov's own father-in-law (who had himself collaborated with the Nazis in the Vlasov army) and nephew had provided affidavits attesting to his activities.

Circassian immigrants who had known Soobzokov in Paterson claimed that he had bragged about serving in German punitive detachments and participating in executions. A number of Circassian immigrants who had ended up settling in Paterson had personally witnessed Soobzokov rounding up Jews as part of Nazi Punitive Detachments, or later in SS uniform as a military recruiter for the Nazis. Several said that Soobzokov had tried to intimidate them by bringing up his political connections.

Soobzokov had confidentially admitted to the CIA that he had indeed participated in an execution unit and hunted for Jews and Communists. Witnesses confirmed he actively participated in those crimes.

== Relationships with the CIA and FBI ==
The CIA first took note of Soobzokov in 1949, and engaged him to provide intelligence and recruit assets in Jordan in December 1950, under the code name "NOSTRIL". Soobzokov proved to be "a failure of an agent," only managing to provide his handlers with 2 potential recruits. Agency reports "indicate[d] that he [Soobzokov] is a rather unscrupulous individual." By the middle of 1952, Soobzokov was unemployed.

The CIA decided to re-engage Soobzokov in 1953, as part of the AEDEPOT program. During a polygraph examination in 1953, a CIA official noted that Soobzokov had "consistent and pronounced reactions to all questions regarding war crimes". Soobzokov continued recruitment operations for the CIA in Jordan until 1955.

In 1957, Soobzokov resumed working for the CIA as part of project AEACRE in the REDSOX program. The Agency sent Soobzokov to Beirut on an assignment to recruit Russian exiles willing to return to the Soviet Union as undercover agents. The assignment was cut short after the Agency learned that Soobzokov was openly flaunting his CIA affiliation and running a scheme promising to use his connections to help refugees emigrate to America.

Soobzokov had falsely told the CIA that he had attended a Soviet military academy, a claim he later recanted when the Agency decided to send him to a bomb-making course in Fort Meade, Maryland in 1958. Finally, after a 1959 debriefing, a CIA examiner concluded that Soobzokov was an "incorrigible fabricator", after which the agency cancelled his operational approval.

In the 1970s, Soobzokov acted as the president of the Committee for Liberation of North Caucasia in the U.S. (incorporated as a non-profit in 1965) and Committee for Liberation of North Caucasia in New Jersey (incorporated as a non-profit in 1971), which were likely CIA-funded anti-Soviet front groups similar to the American Committee for the Liberation of the Peoples of Russia.

In August 1958, Soobzokov became an FBI informant, spying on the immigrant community in Paterson.

== Death ==
Soobzokov's public notoriety resulted in him receiving death threats. The first attempt on Soobzokov's life came in 1979, when someone mailed a package containing a bomb to his house. On 15 August 1985, a pipe bomb was detonated outside Soobzokov's home in Paterson, critically injuring him. Soobzokov died of his wounds on 6 September 1985. An anonymous caller claiming to represent the Jewish Defense League (JDL) said they had carried out the bombing. A spokesman for the JDL later denied responsibility, but applauded Soobzokov's murder as a "righteous act". No one was ever charged with the bombing. Tscherim's son, Aslan Soobzokov, has twice sued the federal government over its investigation. In 2017, Aslan made a statement claiming that "Soobzokov was killed because CIA feared revelation of the truth." The bombing was linked by the FBI to a similar bomb attack on Nazi fugitive Elmārs Sproģis.

The prime suspect in these attacks is Robert Manning, a JDL member who is also considered a prime suspect in the murder of Alex Odeh. In 1994, Manning was convicted of an unrelated non-political murder, that of computer company secretary Patricia Wilkerson in California, in July 1980, and sentenced to life in prison. In October 2023, Manning was granted parole. He was released from prison in July 2024.

== See also ==
- List of unsolved murders (1980–1999)
- Waffen-SS foreign volunteers and conscripts
- Wehrmacht foreign volunteers and conscripts
