= Jerry Posin =

American drummer

- Genres: Blues rock
- Occupations: Musician, music teacher
- Instrument: Drums

Jerry Miles Posin is an American drummer known for his contributions to Steppenwolf in the late 1970s. During this time he penned at least two songs heard at Steppenwolf concerts, "It's Alright" and "Sinsemilla", now available only on bootleg recordings. He later was the drummer for Blues Image and the Kent Henry Band. He is also known for collaborating with Cris Kirkwood of the Meat Puppets while the two served time together at the Federal Correctional Institution, Phoenix in the Arizona Federal Prison Complex from 2004 to 2006.

After being released on May 7, 2009, Posin resurfaced and formed a new band called Bangland. Teaming up with Mike McAul on vocals/guitar and Bruce McAul on bass guitar, Bangland videos can be seen on YouTube. He also formed a band in Phoenix, Arizona called the Urban Tribe. Jerry Miles Posin became engaged to Karen Hattorff in 2011. He continued playing music locally while spending most of his time enjoying life with his family until he died January 29, 2019, still engaged to Karen with daughter Kauner.
