= Federal Correctional Institution, Phoenix =

Medium-security prison in Arizona, US

Coordinates: 33°50′01″N 112°10′06″W

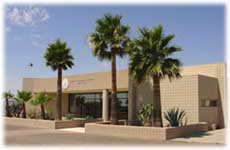
- Interactive map of Federal Correctional Institution, Phoenix
- Location: Phoenix, Arizona
- Status: Operational
- Security class: Medium-security (with minimum-security prison camp)
- Population: 1,180 (300 in prison camp)
- Opened: 1985
- Managed by: Federal Bureau of Prisons

The Federal Correctional Institution, Phoenix (FCI Phoenix) is a medium-security United States federal prison for male and female inmates in Arizona. It is operated by the Federal Bureau of Prisons, a division of the United States Department of Justice. The facility houses female offenders in an adjacent minimum-security satellite prison camp. The campus houses 1,150 total inmates as of 7/15/2024.

FCI Phoenix is located approximately 25 miles north of downtown Phoenix, also west of Anthem, Arizona but still within the city limits.

== History ==
An environmental impact study was prepared in 1980 for the proposed prison, which was being planned while the federal prison system was overwhelmed with incoming inmates. The facility was opened in April 1985 with two housing units, each containing 66 rooms at the time. By 2002, it employed 349 staff and held 1,525 inmates.

== Notable events ==
On November 4, 2005, Earl Krugel, an activist for the Jewish Defense League, a far right pro-Israel organization, was in the exercise yard when another inmate bludgeoned him to death with a block of concrete. Krugel, who had been convicted for plotting to bomb the office of Arab-American congressman Darrell Issa in California, had only been at the prison for three days. Inmate David Frank Jennings was subsequently identified as the attacker. In 2007, Jennings pleaded guilty to second-degree murder and was sentenced to 35 years in prison in 2008.

== Notable Inmates (current and former) ==
Inmate Name	Register Number	Photo	Status	Details
Steven Shawn Smith	12004-509		Serving a 25 year sentence. Scheduled for release in 2042.	Sex offender who communicated with an undercover FBI agent posing as a minor online and by text messages. Smith requested nude images from the undercover agent on multiple occasions. Smith also sent images of his nude genitalia to the undercover agent. Smith discussed meeting with the purported minor to engage in sexually explicit conduct and sent the officer $75 via Cash App so that the purported minor could buy a one-way bus ticket to Ohio. Smith was arrested in October 2020, shortly after sending the money to the undercover agent. In addition to communicating with the undercover agent, Smith messaged more than 170 other online users who identified themselves as minors. He received sexually explicit images from at least 21 of the purported minors and sent nude images of himself to at least 70 users.
Hamid Hayat	15804-097		Served 14 years of a 24 year sentence. After a judge ruled his conviction was the result of poor defense, and excessive interrogation, Hyat had all charges against him dismissed, and was released from federal custody on August 9, 2019.	US citizen of Pakistani descent; convicted in 2006 of providing material support to terrorists for attending an al-Qaeda training camp in Pakistan and planning attacks on hospitals, banks, grocery stores and government buildings in the United States.
Cris Kirkwood	81499-008		Released from custody in 2005 after serving 11 months.	Bassist for the Meat Puppets, an American rock band; pleaded guilty in 2004 to assault with a dangerous weapon for striking a security guard with a baton at a Phoenix post office.
Sonny Barger	82740-011		Released from custody in November 1992	Founder and former leader of the Hells Angels, convicted in 1988 for a racketeering, and transporting firearms to Kentucky to kill members of the Outlaws Motorcycle Club.
Caswell Senior	20180-509		Serving a 15-year sentence; scheduled for release in 2034	Brooklyn born hip-hop artist known professionally as Casanova who was convicted of racketeering charges.
Omar Navarro	81224-510		Serving a 4-year sentence; scheduled for release in 2029	Perennial Republican candidate for California's 43rd congressional district who was convicted of wire fraud related to campaign finance violations.
Jerry Posin	57593-008		Released from custody in 2009 after serving 5 years.	Former drummer for Steppenwolf, an American rock band; played in several prison bands with Cris Kirkwood at FCI Phoenix.
Tyler Barriss	29381-031		Serving a 20 year sentence; scheduled for release in 2035. Currently at FCI Herlong.	Caller during a swatting incident that resulted in the fatal shooting of Andrew Finch, an uninvolved third party.
Earl Krugel	20966-112		Murdered in 2005 while serving a 20 year sentence	Charged with Federal terrorism. Conspiracy to bomb up a mosque, the offices of US Congressman Darrell Issa, and the offices of the Muslim Public Affairs Council.
Brent Wilson	37060-509		Serving a 46-month sentence.	Former bassist of Panic! at the Disco; convicted in 2022 of multiple felony gun and drug charges.

== See also ==
- List of U.S. federal prisons
- Federal Bureau of Prisons
- Incarceration in the United States
