= Alex Odeh =

Palestinian–American activist

- Born: Alexander Michel Odeh; April 4, 1944; Jifna, Mandatory Palestine
- Died: October 11, 1985 (aged 41); Santa Ana, California, U.S.
- Cause of death: Assassinated in a terrorist attack
- Education: Cairo University; California State University, Fullerton
- Occupation: Civil rights activist
- Organization: West Coast regional director of the American-Arab Anti-Discrimination Committee (ADC)
- Known for: Peace and resolution of the Israeli-Palestinian Conflict
- Notable work: Whispers in Exile
- Spouse: Norma Odeh
- Children: Helena, Samya and Susan

Alexander Michel Odeh (Arabic: اسكندر ميكل عودة; April 4, 1944 – October 11, 1985) was a Palestinian-American civil rights activist. He served as the West Coast regional director of the American-Arab Anti-Discrimination Committee (ADC) until he was assassinated in a pipe-bomb explosion at his office in Santa Ana, California.

The FBI investigated the bombing as an act of domestic terrorism and linked the attack to members of the militant group the Jewish Defense League (JDL). Although primary suspects were identified early on, no one has ever been convicted for Odeh's murder, leaving the case officially unsolved. The Odeh assassination is widely documented as a targeted hate crime motivated by anti-Arab sentiment.

== Life and murder ==
Born into a Palestinian Catholic family in Jifna, Mandatory Palestine, Alex Odeh immigrated to the United States in 1972 at the age of 28. He was a lecturer and poet who had published a volume of his poetry, Whispers in Exile. Odeh was a defender of Palestinian human rights and advocate of interfaith dialogue between Christians, Jews, and Muslims. A father of three young daughters at the time of his death, Odeh was the West Coast regional director of the American-Arab Anti-Discrimination Committee (ADC). Preceding his assassination in California, four bombings of ADC offices occurred in Boston, New York and Washington, DC.

The Boston office of the ADC suffered a bombing on August 16, 1985, injuring two officers. The bombing that killed Odeh came the day after the ending of the Palestinian Liberation Front–sponsored Achille Lauro hijacking in which Leon Klinghoffer, a Jewish American, was murdered. The night before his death Odeh explained to the media that the Palestine Liberation Organization (PLO) was not involved in the hijacking and PLO leader Yasser Arafat was ready to make peace.

The day of his murder, October 11, Odeh had been scheduled to speak at Friday prayer services at a synagogue in Fountain Valley, California. Shortly before his killing, Odeh appeared on the television show Nightline. The program featured a back-and-forth between Odeh and a representative from the Jewish Defense League (JDL). Odeh was later killed by a bomb as he opened the door of his office at 1905 East 17th Street in Santa Ana, California.

== Reaction to murder ==
The Anti-Defamation League and the American Jewish Committee both condemned the murder. United States President Ronald Reagan sent a message of condolence.

Irv Rubin, who had become chairman of the JDL the same year, immediately made several public statements in reaction to the incident. "I have no tears for Mr. Odeh", Rubin said. "He got exactly what he deserved." He also said: "My tears were used up crying for Leon Klinghoffer."

Helen Hatab Samhan, deputy director of the Arab American Institute in 1987, wrote that the murder of Odeh "shocked the Arab American community nation-wide and demonstrated how political intolerance had crossed the line into anti-Arab terrorism on American soil." She labeled the crime an example of "political racism," meaning racism that targeted pro-Palestine Arab viewpoints and individuals and groups associated with espousing those particular views.

Samhan also notes that Federal Bureau of Investigation (FBI) Director William Webster warned following Odeh's murder that "Arab individuals or those supporting Arab points of view have come within the zone of danger, targeted by a group as of yet to be fully identified and brought to justice."

== Criminal investigation ==
Four weeks after Odeh's death, FBI spokesperson Lane Bonner stated the FBI attributed the bombing and two others to the JDL. Rubin criticized the FBI for implying his organization's guilt without evidence, saying the FBI "could take their possible link and shove it." In February 1986, the FBI classified the bombing that killed Alex Odeh as a terrorist act. In July, they eased away from their original position, saying the JDL was "probably" responsible for this attack and four others, but that final attribution to the JDL or any other group "must await further investigation." Rubin again denied the JDL's involvement. "What the FBI is doing is simple", he stated, "Some character calls up a news agency or whatever and uses the phrase Never Again, ... and on that assumption they can go and slander a whole group. That's tragic." The JDL denied any involvement in Odeh's killing.

Immediately after the 1985 assassination the FBI identified three suspects—all of whom were believed to be affiliated with the JDL—who fled to Israel soon after the incident: Robert Manning, Keith Fuchs and Andy Green. Floyd Clarke, then assistant director of the FBI, claimed in an internal memo that key suspects had fled to Israel and were living in Kiryat Arba, an Israeli settlement in the West Bank.

=== Arrest and trial of Robert Manning ===
In 1988, the FBI arrested Rochelle Manning, Robert Manning's wife, as a suspect in a mail bombing which killed a computer company secretary, Patricia Wilkerson, in Manhattan Beach, California, in July 1980. Rochelle Manning was also considered a possible suspect in Odeh's murder. It also charged her husband, Robert Manning, who was considered a prime suspect in the Odeh bombing. Manning had previously been convicted of a 1972 bombing of the home of an Arab activist in Hollywood, and was a suspect in three other bombings in 1985, one of which killed Tscherim Soobzokov. Both Rochelle and Robert Manning were members of the JDL. Rochelle's jury deadlocked, and after the mistrial she left for Israel to join her husband.

In 1989, American journalist Chris Hedges discovered Robert Manning's residency in Kiryat Arba due to his use of a compromised alias. The US government requested Robert Manning's extradition in 1991. It also requested Rochelle Manning be extradited for a retrial. After an unsuccessful two-year legal battle in the Israeli courts to prevent his extradition, Robert Manning was extradited in 1993. Robert Manning was charged with the bombing attack that killed Wilkerson and convicted; in February 1994, Judge Dickran Tevrizian sentenced him to life imprisonment with a minimum of 30 years before parole. This was subsequently reduced to a minimum of 10 years before parole. After some years imprisoned at USP Lompoc, Manning was transferred to the medium security federal prison in Phoenix, Arizona. Rochelle Manning died in an Israeli prison on March 18, 1994, while awaiting extradition to the United States after the Israeli Supreme Court rejected her final appeal against extradition.

=== Later developments ===
In April 1994, the Alex Odeh Memorial Statue, created by Algerian-American sculptor Khalil Bendib, was erected in front of the Santa Ana Central Library over protests by the JDL. On October 11, 1996, the eleventh anniversary of Odeh's murder, vandals defaced the statue. On February 6, 1997, vandals poured two gallons of red paint on the statue. JDL chairman Irv Rubin commented: "I think the guy [Odeh] is a war criminal." The ADC called for greater government efforts to catch Odeh's killers.

On August 27, 1996, the FBI announced a $1 million reward for information leading to the arrest of Odeh's killers. JDL members heckled the FBI spokespersons announcing the reward. The reward is still in force.

In 2007, the FBI revealed they had received information from a deceased informant, believed to be former JDL member Earl Krugel, who had been sentenced to 20 years in federal prison for 2001 plots to bomb a Southern California mosque and office of an Arab American congressman. It is believed that Rubin, who died in prison while awaiting trial on the same charges, revealed to Krugel the names of those responsible for Odeh's death and Krugel shared those with the FBI before he, too, died in prison. The bombers are believed to be Manning and two other JDL activists, Keith Fuchs and Andy Green, all of whom fled to Israel where they have avoided prosecution and extradition. Manning is believed to have settled in Kiryat Arba.

In October 2023, Robert Manning was granted parole. He was released from prison on July 24, 2024.

== Legacy ==
The ADC continues to honor Odeh's memory and call for prosecution of his killers. In 2025, the ADC opened its first Southern California office since the attack in Anaheim's Little Arabia. A documentary that explored the murder, Who Killed Alex Odeh? (2026) by filmmaker Jason Osder and William Lafi Youmans, was the winner of the Sundance U.S. Documentary Special Jury Award for Journalistic Excellence.

== See also ==
- Anti-Arab racism in the United States
- History of Palestinians in Los Angeles

== Books ==
- "Americans for Middle East Understanding: An Interview with Ellen Nassab". Archived from the original on October 20, 2007.
