= American-Arab Anti-Discrimination Committee =

Civil rights organization in the United States

- Type: 501(c)(4) organization
- Tax ID no.: 52-1180441
- Headquarters: Washington, D.C.
- Location: United States
- Website: adc.org

The American-Arab Anti-Discrimination Committee (ADC) states that it is "the largest Arab American grassroots civil rights organization in the United States." According to its webpage, it is open to people of all backgrounds, faiths and ethnicities and has a national network of chapters and members in all 50 states. It claims that three million Americans trace their roots to an Arab country.

The ADC seeks to "empower Arab Americans, defend the civil rights of all people, promote Arab cultural heritage, promote civic participation, encourage a balanced US policy in the Middle East and support freedom and development in the Arab World." ADC has a number of programs to combat discrimination and bias against Arab-Americans, including stereotypes of Arabs in the United States. The ADC is a member of the Leadership Conference on Civil and Human Rights and holds a seat on the Leadership Conference National Board of Directors.

== Organization ==
The ADC Legal Department offers counseling in cases of discrimination, defamation and hate crimes and provides assistance in selected litigation. Since the September 11 attacks, ADC attorneys have addressed hundreds of cases against airlines and employers for discrimination on the basis of ethnicity and national origin and against the United States government for discriminatory detentions of Arabs and Muslims without probable cause.

The Government Affairs department works with the United States Congress, the White House, the United States Department of State and Department of Justice, as well as other government agencies to promote the interests of the community. US citizen members of ADC can contribute to the NAAA-ADC Political Action Committee (PAC) to support political candidates for federal office.

Convention speakers have included government officials like Department of Homeland Security civil rights officer Daniel W. Sutherland and then-United States Secretary of State Colin L. Powell

== History ==
=== 20th century ===
During the 1970s American Arabs' concerns about negative media images grew as a result of the Arab–Israeli conflict and Arab countries' defeat in the 1967 Arab–Israeli War grew. ADC was founded in 1980 by James Abourezk, the first Arab-American United States senator, and Arab-American political activist James Zogby. Abourezk initially was motivated by unfair stereotyping of Arabs in media, anti-Arabism in general and the Abscam sting where Federal Bureau of Investigation agents posed as Arabs. He helped bring together more than 60 Arab leaders from around the nation who agreed to form the committee. Abourezk stated: "When we started up people used to ask us why we started. Now they ask us for our opinion on things.”

After the 1982 Lebanon War, ADC began organizing demonstrations and marches. The war increased Arab Americans' willingness to speak out in general, as well as groups' use of the term "Arab American" to self-identify.

In 1985, ADC offices suffered a series of violent attacks. On August 16, a bomb exploded in the American-Arab Anti-Discrimination Committee office in Boston, severely injuring two police officers. On October 29 an arson fire damaged the ADC office in Washington, D.C. On October 11, the day after the Achille Lauro incident where a Jewish American was shot and thrown overboard, Alex Odeh, ADC's west-coast regional director, was killed in an explosion when he opened the door to his office. The Federal Bureau of Investigation (FBI) suspected Jewish Defense League and Jewish Defense Organization members.

Although Jewish Defense League leader Irv Rubin, who lived in Southern California, made controversial statements about the bombing, the investigation focused on Robert Manning and his wife Rochelle who fled to Israel. They eventually were prosecuted on another bombing charge and Manning is serving a life sentence on that charge.

During the 1991 Gulf War, ADC president James Abourezk expressed concern that Arab Americans would be targeted. He claimed a violent anti-Arab telephone message had been left on an ADC answering machine. ADC documented more than 100 hate crimes against Arab-Americans committed from August 1990 through March 1991, including arson against a Detroit restaurant and the planting of a bomb in a San Diego mosque.

In 1993, ADC and the American Civil Liberties Union settled a lawsuit against Pan American World Airways for their detention of a man of Iranian descent during the 1991 Gulf War. The groups and individual shared in the $110,000 settlement.

In 1993, ADC protested the characterization of Arabs and song lyrics in the 1992 Disney film, Aladdin, leading Entertainment Weekly to describe Aladdin as one of the most controversial films in history.

In 1993, twelve civil rights groups led by the ADC and the National Lawyers Guild filed a lawsuit in U.S. District Court in Los Angeles alleging that the Anti-Defamation League (ADL) had spied on their political activities and shared information with police. They demanded that ADL release its surveillance information and pay punitive damages. They also sued the police and sheriffs' departments of San Francisco, Los Angeles and San Diego.

Then communications director Hussein Ibish claimed that ADL was gathering information "systematically in a program whose clear intent was to undermine civil rights and Arab-American organizations." In 1999 ADL agreed to purge certain personal information about the plaintiffs, pay $175,000 for the plaintiffs' legal fees and contribute $25,000 to a community relations fund to advance good relations among Arabs, Jews and others.

In 1996, the U.S. Congress passed the Antiterrorism and Effective Death Penalty Act, which increased regulation of fundraising that might benefit terrorists and made it easier to bar or deport individuals with suspected terrorist affiliations. It also passed the Illegal Immigration Reform and Immigrant Responsibility Act allowing deportation of immigrants for minor offenses, even those committed decades ago, and even if individuals had American spouses and/or children. It also allowed secret classified evidence and denial of bond for those under threat of deportation. ADC began campaigns to contest these laws and even dilute or overturn them through legal action. One lawsuit by Arabs claiming they were targeted for deportation because of affiliations with an unpopular political group, in violation of their First and Fifth Amendment, reached the Supreme Court, in Reno v. American-Arab Anti-Discrimination Committee 525 U.S. 471 (1999). While the ruling cast doubt on the role of secret evidence, many observers interpreted it as restricting First Amendment rights of all non-citizens, including legal immigrants.

=== 21st century ===
In 2000, ADC supported a congressional letter to President Bill Clinton, signed by 68 members of Congress, calling for economic sanctions against the people of Iraq to be lifted. ADC's press release noted that the United Nations estimated that over one million civilians, mostly children, had died from malnutrition and disease due to the embargo.

In 2004 ADC signed on to a letter affirming the Palestinian Right of Return in response to President George W. Bush's declaration of support for the policies of Prime Minister of Israel, Ariel Sharon which allegedly denied that right.

After the September 11 attacks, ADC concerned itself with "an unprecedented backlash in the form of hate crimes, discrimination and various civil liberties violations" against the Arab American community, as well as against Muslims. It also addressed the October 2001 passage of the Patriot Act which increased federal law enforcement surveillance abilities, eased restrictions on foreign intelligence gathering within the U.S., expanded regulation of financial transactions and enhanced law enforcement abilities to detain and deport immigrants merely suspected of some relation to terrorists. Under the Act law enforcement immediately targeted mainly Arab-Americans and South Asians, including "massive secret detentions," selective enforcement through "voluntary" interviews, deportation of Middle Eastern men and further restrictions on immigration by Arabs and Muslims.

In December 2001, ADC met with US Department of Justice representatives to express concerns about the Patriot Act. It was a signatory to a March 17, 2003 letter from a number of civil liberties and other organizations asking members of the U.S. Congress to oppose the leaked draft of the Domestic Security Enhancement Act of 2003 holding it contained "a multitude of new and sweeping law enforcement and intelligence gathering powers … that would severely dilute, if not undermine, many basic constitutional rights." Also known as "Patriot Act II," it was not passed into law. In 2002 ADC joined a coalition of Muslim groups to sue then-Attorney General John Ashcroft and the Immigration and Naturalization Service for arrests and detention of immigrant men trying to register with federal authorities.

In 2003, when then University of South Florida professor Sami Al-Arian was indicted on terrorism-related charges, then-communications director Hussein Ibish stated: "Until we have some reason based in fact to think otherwise, I think that the presumption has to be that this is a political witch-hunt, a vendetta, and a kind of very, very ugly post-9/11 McCarthyism." In December, 2005, after Al-Arian was acquitted of eight charges, and the jury deadlocked on nine others, ADC stated that in the verdict was seen as a "major defeat" for some of the most controversial elements of the Patriot Act. On March 2, 2006, Al-Arian entered a guilty plea to a charge of conspiracy to help the Palestinian Islamic Jihad, a "specially designated terrorist" organization. He was sentenced to 57 months in prison, and ordered deported following his prison term.

In 2003, ADC was a co-plaintiff with the American Civil Liberties Union and other groups in the first major legal challenge to Section 215 of the Patriot Act that expands federal agents’ power to secretly obtain records and personal belongings of citizens and permanent residents. They charged it violated constitutional protections against unreasonable searches and seizures, as well as rights to freedom of speech and association. After a nationwide campaign to reform the Patriot Act, in 2006 the plaintiffs withdrew the suit, citing improvements to the law.

In 2004, ADC demanded that Webster's Third New International Dictionary remove from its definition of anti-Semitism "opposition to Zionism" and "sympathy for the opponents of Israel". ADC then-communications director Hussein Ibish wrote that the extended definition trivialized the "very concept of anti-Semitism" and "smears and impugns the motives of all those who support the human and political rights of Palestinians." A Merriam-Webster company spokesman stated that the older definition was not supported by current usage and probably would be dropped with publication of a new unabridged version by 2010.

In the weeks before the 2004 United States presidential election, a San Francisco-based ADC official wrote about federal law enforcement's "October Plan," including home intrusions and work site visits on Middle Easterners and South Asians to seek information about a possible pre-election terrorist attack. Because counter terrorism officials admitted they had no specific intelligence about such a plan, the official asserted that the plan was a "makeover of other racially and politically motivated Bush administration initiatives, appears timed to elevate fear in the United States in the days before the presidential election."

During the 2006 Lebanon War, ADC filed a federal lawsuit claiming that Secretary of State Condoleezza Rice and Secretary of Defense Donald Rumsfeld failed to fulfill constitutional obligations to protect US citizens under attack in Lebanon. The lawsuit asked the federal court to compel the officials to request a cease fire and to stop all U.S. military support to Israel during the evacuation of US citizens from Lebanon. ADC president Hon. Mary Rose Oakar charged that "the Bush Administration has encouraged the violence by sending an urgent shipment of bombs to Israel giving that country the green light to continue in its indiscriminant [sic] bombing of Lebanon."

In 2007, the FBI revealed they had received information from a deceased informant, believed to be former Jewish Defense League member Earl Krugel who had been sentenced to 20 years in federal prison for 2001 plots to bomb a Southern California mosque and office of U.S. Representative Darrell Issa, who is Arab-American. It is believed that Irv Rubin, who committed suicide in 2002 in custody of the Federal Bureau of Prisons in Los Angeles while awaiting trial on the same charges, revealed to Krugel the names of those responsible for Odeh's death and that Krugel shared those with the FBI before he was murdered in prison in 2005. The bombers are believed to be Manning and two individuals now living in Israel. ADC continues to honor Odeh's memory and call for prosecution of his killers. The FBI has failed to arrest anyone in the Odeh bombing case.

ADC protested a March 2008 Iowa comment on radio by Republican Congressman Steve King who said that if Barack Obama was elected president, “then the radical Islamists and their supporters will be dancing in the streets in greater numbers than they did on September 11 because they will declare victory in this War on Terror." He also raised questions about Obama's middle name “Hussein,” reiterating similar comments in an Associated Press interview. ADC called for Congress to censure King.

In July 2008, ADC signed on to a letter to Senator Joseph Lieberman, who chairs the United States Senate Committee on Homeland Security and Governmental Affairs, expressing concerns that Arabs and Muslims were not consulted before, and their views mischaracterized in, a May committee report titled, "Violent Islamist Extremism, the Internet and the Homegrown Terrorist Threat." Lieberman assured the groups he does intend to consult with them on security issues.

In November 2008, Benjamin Emanuel, the father of U.S. president Barack Obama's new Chief of Staff appointee Rahm Emanuel was quoted by a Hebrew language daily as saying, "Obviously, he will influence the President to be pro-Israel. Why shouldn't he do it? What is he, an Arab? He's not going to clean the floor of the White House." ADC called on Rahm Emanuel to repudiate his father's comment, saying it viewed "this characterization of an Arab as an unacceptable smear." On November 13, 2008, Rahm Emanuel issued a statement doing so. An Emanuel spokesman said Emanuel offered to meet with Arab-American community representatives in the future."

In December 2011, the ADC supported and called for a boycott against Lowe's, a U.S. department store, saying that it was a protest "against bigotry and hatred" due to Lowe's decision to no longer advertise on the television show "All-American Muslim."

On May 31, 2013, then-Michigan state representative Rashida Tlaib accused ADC's Michigan director Imad Hamad of sexually harassing her in 1999. Tlaib decided to go public "to protect other young women from Hamad’s pattern of twisted behavior." After placing Hamad on leave, the ADC board of directors concluded four months later that there was no sufficient evidence against Hamad and reassigned him to a new position. Warren David, ADC President was subsequently placed on probation, and four female staff members resigned.

Samer Khalaf, an attorney from New Jersey who was on the national board and executive committee of the ADC, and former interim legal director, became ADC national president in December 2013.

== National Association of Arab-Americans ==
The National Association of Arab Americans (NAAA) was a political advocacy group for Americans of Arab heritage which existed between 1972 and 2002. It focused on lobbying the federal government on issues including the Arab–Israeli conflict. In a 2006 book, scholar Gregory Orfalea considered it one of the three most influential Arab-American advocacy organizations, along with the Association of Arab-American University Graduates (AAUG) and the ADC.

At the peak of its influence in the 1970s, the NAAA had around 200,000 members. It was the first Arab-American organization to officially register as a lobby. Unlike earlier Arab-American advocacy groups like the AAUG, it was primarily made up of second- and third-generation Arab-Americans with fewer direct ties to Middle Eastern societies.
