= Dov Schperling =

Zionist pioneer

Dov Schperling

Dov Schperling (Hebrew: דב שפרלינג, or Boris Shperling; 17 December 1937 – 5 Mar 2014) was a Zionist activist and leader who was amongst the first Jews to immigrate from the Soviet Union to Israel. He began his Zionist advocacy during the reign of the communists in the Soviet Union, when such activity was illegal, and as a consequence was imprisoned in a Russian gulag for two years. After his release, he emigrated to Israel, there he continued his struggle for the freedom of Soviet Jews. He was a member of the Herut right wing party and was a delegate of the Jewish Agency to Austria.

== Early life ==
Dov Schperling was born in 1937 in Riga, Latvia. His father Samuel (Sasha) was a soldier in the Latvian army and his mother was a housewife. In 1941, his mother fled with Dov from the advancing Nazi forces, to East USSR and his father joined the ranks of the Latvian division of the Red Army to fight against the Nazis. In 1945, after the liberation of Riga they returned and reunited with his father. His mother and his father, who worked in commerce, and Dov lived with three families of relatives in a two-room apartment. In 1950 his father died of a heart attack.

== Politics in the Soviet Union ==
In 1955 he first heard the sounds of Israeli anthem ("The Hope") during a football match between the Israeli and Soviet Union teams, and although he did not know the anthem, hearing it for the first time gave him a strong sense of identity. In 1956, when he was a student at the Faculty of Mathematics and Physics in Riga, he heard about the Israeli military operation "Operation Kadesh" during the Suez Crisis. The description of the operation and events in Israel brought to his attention the power and capabilities of the State of Israel. This affected him greatly; he began to be an active Zionist and the Land of Israel became the center of his world. Dov began to distribute material about the land of Israel and the Jewish people to Jews of his age. Schperling was imprisoned for two years in the camp, where he met other dissidents, including Joseph Schneider, David Chavkin, Alec (Elhanan) Feldman, maintaining contact with them throughout his life. In the camp, his connection with Judaism and the Zionist ideal grew and he began studying Hebrew.

When he returned to Riga in 1959, he became a prominent figure in the Zionist underground in the city. Along with other idealists like him, he copied Zionist writings, including "Exodus" and distributed the material to many areas of the USSR.

== Emigration to Israel ==
After the Six-Day War, Soviet authorities wanted to get rid of "problematic" Zionist activists and as a consequence, Dov immigrated to Israel in 1968. After he immigrated to Israel, Dov continued to fight for the right of Soviet Jewish immigration, even when the methods of this struggle were not accepted by the Israeli establishment. Dov rallied the Israeli University Students Association to his struggle, organized rallies, met with key figures across the country and used the media and other means to enable the immigration of Russian Jews to Israel.

== Political activism ==
Dov Schperling addressing students during a rally in Jerusalem for the Freedom of Soviet Jews

During the late 1960s and early 1970s he traveled to different cities in the world to hold demonstrations, often unconventional, and campaigns for freedom of emigration-Aliyah to Israel. In 1970, he flew to New York, along with the fellow immigration activist Jacob Kedmi (Yasha Kazakov), who went on to become the head of the Nativ organization. There they had a nine-day hunger strike in front of the United Nations. The strike made waves in Israel and around the world, during which Kedmi devised the slogan "Let my people go", that became a symbol of the struggle for Jewish immigration. In 1971, Schperling was one of eight former Soviet Jews who cabled American Jewish leaders protesting their denunciations of the Jewish Defense League and calling the League's activities "most effective." He claimed that a recent cancellation of the Bolshoi Ballet's scheduled American tour was forced by the Jewish Defense League and hailed it as the first public surrender by Soviet authorities to Jewish pressure. Over the years, Dov was active in the Herut [Israeli right wing] Central Committee. In 1979 he joined the Department of Soviet Union Immigration of the Jewish Agency. Later on, Dov was the head of the Jewish Agency for Israel delegation in Vienna, and the head of the Jewish agency travel department.

Dov Schperling with prime minister Menahem Begin and IDF commander in chief Ariel Sharon

== Family and heritage ==
In 1973 Dov Schperling married Ella Clear and had their daughter Rachel and their sons Schmuel and Yair. After retiring from the Jewish Agency, he received an award from the Keren Hayesod foundation for his struggle for Soviet Jewry, was interviewed by the Israeli Kneset channel, and appeared in a television event in honor of Geulah Cohen.

Dov Schperling died from cancer in 2014. A memorial event was held in the Jabotinsky Institute, hosted by the head of the institute, Yossi Achimeir. Schperling was mourned by Silva Zalmanson, Jacov Kedmi, Geulah Cohen (who due to her medical condition sent a letter that was read in the event), friends and his sons Schmuel and Yair.

In 2019 the "Dov Schperling Plaza" was inaugurated in Hatsvi 10 street, outside the central station in Jerusalem.

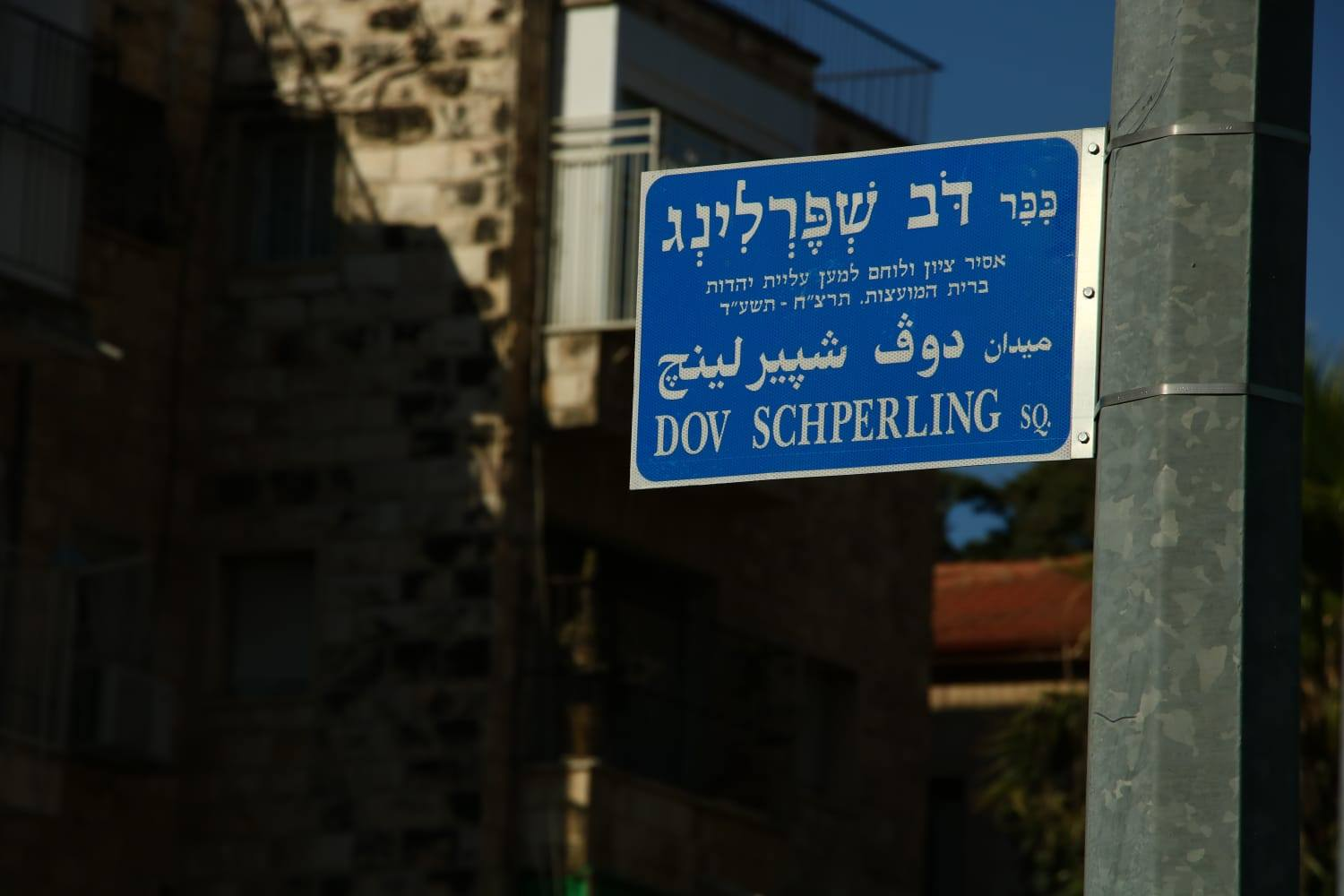
The sign of the Dov Schperling Plaza in Jerusalem

== Sources ==
- Article about Schperling from the Israeli national newspaper archive
- Article form the Israeli national newspaper archive about Dov Schperling and Yasha Kazakov
- Article from the Haaretz newspaper stating Dov's involvement in the Zionist struggle relating to President Golda Meir
- Article about Dov Schperling in the Haaretz newspaper
- Dov Shperling (1983). Book of the Martyrs of the Gallows. Jewish Agency for Israel.
