= Yoel Lerner =

American-Israeli linguist and political activist

- יואל לרנר
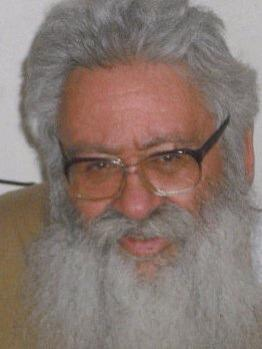
- Born: Joel Lerner; 1941; Brooklyn, New York City, United States
- Died: 2014 (aged 72–73)
- Political party: Yamin Yisrael (1996)

Yoel Lerner (Hebrew: יואל לרנר; 1941 - July 2014) was an American-Israeli linguist, translator, educator, and Jewish terrorist, who was convicted of crimes including seeking to destroy the Dome of the Rock in Jerusalem.

== Personal life ==
Lerner was born as "Joel Lerner" in 1941 in Brooklyn, New York, and grew up in South Africa. In 1960, he immigrated to Israel and studied at the Hebrew University, where he earned a BA in Hebrew and Semitic Philology.

He became a student of Meir Kahane and a member of the Jewish Defense League; and later became an aide to Kahane. He was married and had eight children.

Lerner and his family adopted an Orthodox lifestyle, moved to Kiryat Shmona - where he was a teacher - and then returned to Jerusalem.

== Biography ==
Lerner taught in many secondary educational institutions, and translated essays and books. His translations included The "Shabbes Goy": A Study in Halakhic Flexibility (Philadelphia: Jewish Publication Society, 1989).

In February 1973, Lerner was arrested in a case of arson involving a fire in a shop selling Christian missionary books. That August, he and JDL secretary Yosef Schneider were both sentenced to six months in prison for arson. Seven other JDL members received suspended sentences ranging from one to six months.

In 1975, Lerner was arrested on suspicion of conspiring to harm United States Secretary of Defense Henry Kissinger. Newspaper reports said that Lerner "had expressed threats to assassinate Kissinger".

In 1978, Lerner was arraigned on charges of conspiracy and illegal possession of weapons. Israeli prosecutors accused him of being the founder of an underground ring of militants, and of recruiting young students to overthrow the government, establish a state based on religious law, and kill Arabs. Lerner called the group "Gal", a Hebrew acronym for "redemption of Israel". Members were issued membership cards, given code names, and assigned specific duties such as planning, organization, sabotage, and spying. Some received training in karate. Lerner served a three-year sentence.

In 1982, Lerner formed a small youth organization whose aim was to destroy the Dome of the Rock. He allegedly organized a field trip to an army base in the south to steal explosives to be used in blowing up the Dome of the Rock.

He was sentenced to five years in jail, but 2 ½ years of his sentence was suspended.

His purpose was to make it possible to rebuild the Temple Mount site.

In 1996, Lerner ran for the Israeli Knesset as a member of Yamin Yisrael, and was assigned the fifth slot on its electoral list. He was not elected as the party won no seats.

== Outlook and legacy ==
Mark Juergensmeyer identified Lerner as a Jewish religious terrorist, writing that he "yearned for a Jewish society in Israel. He hoped for the restoration of the ancient temple in Jerusalem, the exclusive right of Jews to settle on the West Bank of the Jordan River, and the creation of a state based on biblical law."
