= Terry Long (white supremacist) =

Canadian white supremacist

Terry Long (born May 1, 1946) is the former leader of Aryan Nations in Canada. He was born in Red Deer, Alberta, and ran for public office in the Lacombe, Alberta Riding as a member of the Western Canada Concept party. In the 1980s and early 1990s, he led Aryan Nations's Canadian branch and staged a major rally and cross burning in Provost, Alberta.
