= Jewish Defense League =

Far-right Jewish political organization

- Founder: Meir Kahane
- Leader: Shelley Rubin
- Founded: 1968; 58 years ago
- Allegiance: Kach Party (formerly)
- Headquarters: New York City; Los Angeles; Toronto
- Active regions: United States; Canada; Israel
- Ideology: Kahanism: Zionism; Radical opposition to antisemitism; Anti-Arab sentiment; Anti-Nazism
- Political position: Far-right
- Status: Inactive in the United States and Canada (2021); Active in France
- Size: 15,000 (peak)

The Jewish Defense League (JDL) is a far-right political organization in the United States, Canada and France. Its stated goal is to "protect Jews from antisemitism by whatever means necessary"; it was described as a "right-wing terrorist group" by the Federal Bureau of Investigation (FBI) in 2001, and is also designated as a hate group by the Southern Poverty Law Center. According to the FBI, the JDL has been involved in plotting and executing acts of terrorism within the United States. Most terrorist watch groups classify the group as inactive as of 2015.

Founded by Meir Kahane in New York City in 1968, the JDL's self-described purpose was to protect Jews from local manifestations of antisemitism. Its criticism of the Soviet Union increased local support for the group, transforming it from a "vigilante club" into an organization with a stated membership numbering over 15,000 at one point. The group took to bombing Arab and Soviet properties in the United States while assassinating a variety of alleged "enemies of the Jewish people" ranging from Arab-American political activists to neo-Nazis. A number of JDL members have been linked to violent, and sometimes deadly, attacks in the United States and in other countries, including the murder of the American-Arab Anti-Discrimination Committee regional director Alex Odeh in 1985; the Cave of the Patriarchs massacre in 1994; a plot to assassinate U.S. representative Darrell Issa in 2001; and a plot to bomb the King Fahad Mosque in Culver City, California. In 1990, Kahane was assassinated by an Egyptian-American gunman, El Sayyid Nosair, at a hotel in New York City.

Mainstream Jewish organizations have rejected the JDL since its founding, with the Anti-Defamation League stating that it consists only of "thugs and hooligans."

== History ==
=== 1968: Events leading to the first demonstration ===
In 1968, while Meir Kahane was serving as associate editor of The Jewish Press, the paper's office began receiving calls and letters reporting crimes against Jews and Jewish institutions. Violence in the New York City area was on the rise, with Jews accounting for a disproportionately share of the victims. Elderly Jews were harassed and mugged, storeowners were robbed, and Jewish teachers were assaulted, while Jewish synagogues were defaced and Jewish cemeteries desecrated.

After discussing the matter with several congregants, Kahane placed an ad in The Jewish Press on May 24, 1968, which read: "We are talking of JEWISH SURVIVAL! Are you willing to stand up for democracy and Jewish survival? Join and support the Jewish Defense Corps." Shortly after, Kahane renamed the group the "Jewish Defense League," out of concern that the word "Corps" would be construed as too militant. The group's declared purpose was "to combat anti-Semitism in the public and private sectors of life in the United States of America." Kahane said that the JDL was formed to "do the job that the Anti-Defamation League (ADL) should do but doesn't."

Shortly afterward, the JDL published a four-page manifesto. It stated: "America has been good to the Jew and the Jew has been good to America" described the U.S. as a country founded on democracy and freedom that had provided unprecedented opportunities to Jews, while warning that it was threatened by "political extremism" and "racist militancy." The manifesto also stated that the organization rejected hate and illegality, supported law and order and police, and would use the courts to challenge discrimination. When asked about JDL members breaking the law, Kahane responded, "We respect the right and the obligation of the American government to prosecute us and send us to jail. No one gripes about that."

The group adopted the slogan "Never again!", which had been used by Jewish resistance fighters in the Warsaw Ghetto. The phrase is commonly understood as a declaration that a genocide against Jews on the scale of the Holocaust must never be allowed to recur. Kahane said, however, that his use of the slogan was intended to emphasize that Jews should never again be caught off guard or lulled into placing foolish trust in others.

The first JDL demonstration took place on August 5, 1968, at New York University, where about 15 members chanted, "No Nazis at NYU, Jewish rights are precious too."

=== 1969: Operations in the New York and Boston regions ===
On August 7, the JDL sent members to Passaic, New Jersey, to protect Jewish merchants from anti-Jewish rioting that had swept the area for days. On November 25, the JDL was invited to the Boston area by Jewish residents in response to a mounting wave of crime directed primarily against Jews. On December 3, JDL members attacked the Syrian Mission in New York City.

On December 31, 13 JDL members were arrested after a series of coordinated actions against Soviet property in Manhattan and at Kennedy Airport intended to protest the treatment of Jews in the Soviet Union. Several youths painted slogans on a Soviet airliner, and two of them handcuffed themselves to the airliner while others daubed the words "Am Yisroel Chai" (lit. '[the] People Israel Lives') on the plane's doors. A similar slogan was painted on the walls of the office of TASS, the Soviet news agency, in Rockefeller Plaza, which was invaded by Kahane and four other JDL members. The rest of the demonstrators were taken into custody after invading the midtown offices of the Soviet tourist bureau.

In 1969 the JDL was targeted by the FBI's COINTELPRO program, which attempted to provoke it to attack the Black Panther Party.

=== 1970: Demonstrations and an airplane hijack attempt ===
==== January–March 1970 ====
Initially, the League was connected to a series of violent attacks against the Soviet Union's interests in the United States, protesting the repression of Soviet Jews, who were often jailed and refused exit visas. The JDL decided that violence was necessary to draw attention to their plight, reasoning that Moscow would respond to the strain on Soviet Union–United States relations by allowing more emigration to Israel.

In 1970, according to Christopher Andrew and Vasili Mitrokhin, agents of the Soviet KGB forged and sent threatening letters to Arab diplomatic missions claiming to be from the JDL to discredit it. They were also ordered to bomb a target in the "Negro section of New York" and blame it on the JDL. On January 25, JDL members staged anti-Soviet demonstrations at a concert of the Moscow Philharmonic Orchestra in Brooklyn College's auditorium. JDL members "danced, sang and yelled" while trying to prevent people from entering the auditorium.

On March 23, JDL members staged a sit-in in the office of the president of the Federation of Jewish Philanthropies of New York to demand that the Federation allocate more funds for Jewish education and Jewish defense, assist institutions threatened by violence, and arrange for "popular" election of Federation officials. As a result, the Federation agreed to form a special committee to consider the request for additional funds for Jewish education, while other groups continued to demonstrate.

==== April–June 1970 ====
On April 7, the JDL held memorial services on behalf of civilian victims of "Arab terrorism during the past half century" in front of the United Arab Republic Mission to the United Nations.

On April 9, nine JDL members occupied the principal's office of Leeds Junior High School in Philadelphia after school authorities had allegedly failed to crack down on school violence. The JDL hoped to present six "suggestions" for protecting students from assault and theft by "troublemakers," including committing them to disciplinary schools, stationing policemen in the public schools, and replacing "weak administrators."

On April 20, fifteen JDL members were arrested after chaining themselves to the fence in front of the Soviet Mission to the UN to protest against the treatment of Jews in the Soviet Union. On May 8, about fifty JDL members demonstrated outside the Black Panther Party headquarters in Harlem due to an alleged "outrageous explosion of anti-Semitic hatred" by the Panthers. On May 19, the JDL issued a statement attacking American Jewish organizations that opposed the Vietnam War, accusing them of doing more to destroy the State of Israel "than all the Arab armies."

On May 20, 35 JDL members took over the Park East Synagogue, opposite the Soviet Mission, and barricaded the entrances in order to hold a "liberation seder" for Soviet Jewry.

On June 23, about forty JDL members seized two floors of an office building in New York housing Amtorg, the official Soviet Union trade office, and evicted the personnel in what the JDL deemed retaliation for the arrests of Jews and raids on Jewish homes in the Soviet Union.

On June 28, 150 JDL members demonstrated over attacks against the Jews of Williamsburg, Brooklyn, in reprisal for the accidental killing of a Black girl by a Jewish driver. Clashes broke out with other minority groups, and arrests were made.

==== July–September 1970 ====
On August 16, 400 JDL members began a week-long march from Philadelphia to Washington, D.C., on behalf of Soviet Jewry, concluding with a rally at Lafayette Park urging President Richard Nixon to "stand tall and firm in the Middle East as you have done elsewhere." In response, Thomas Hale Boggs Jr., a congressional candidate from Montgomery County, Maryland, said he would sponsor a House resolution on Soviet Jewry.

On September 27, two JDL members were arrested at John F. Kennedy International Airport while attempting to board a London-bound plane armed with four loaded guns and a live hand grenade. The two intended to hijack a United Arab Airlines plane and divert it to Israel.

==== October–December 1970 ====
On October 6, the JDL is suspected of bombing the New York office of the Palestine Liberation Organization (PLO) after the Popular Front for the Liberation of Palestine, a member-party of the PLO, hijacked four airliners the previous month. United Press International reported that an anonymous caller phoned in about a half hour before the explosion and proclaimed the JDL slogan, "Never again."

On December 20, during a march to protest the treatment of Soviet Jewry, JDL members attempted to take over the Soviet Mission headquarters. The members were arrested after inciting demonstrators to break through police lines. On December 27, the JDL launched a 100-hour vigil for Soviet Jewry. Demonstrators tried to break through police barricades to reach the Soviet Mission to the UN to protest the sentencing of Jews in Leningrad. Several arrests were made. On December 29, an estimated 100 JDL members demonstrated in front of the offices of the New York Board of Rabbis, challenging them to get arrested "for Jews, as well as for blacks." Later that day, several JDL members scuffled with police outside the office of Aeroflot-In, the official Soviet tourist agency, while JDL leader Meir Kahane demanded the right to purchase two tickets to Israel for two Russian Jews who were sentenced to death. About 75 JDL members marched near the office, chanting slogans such as "Freedom Now" and "Let My People Go." On December 30, several hundred JDL members participated in a rally for Soviet Jewry in Foley Square, chanting "Let My People Go," "Open Up the Iron Door," and "Never Again!"

=== 1971: Explosion and other actions around Soviet Jewry ===
On January 8, 1971, a bombing outside of the Soviet cultural center in Washington, D.C., was followed by a phone call including the JDL slogan "Never again." A JDL spokesperson denied the group's involvement in the bombing, but refused to condemn it. On January 17, in response to JDL tactics against Soviet personnel being condemned by the Israeli Cabinet and American Jewish leaders, eight former Soviet Jews living in Israel sent cables to American Jewish leaders denouncing their condemnation of the JDL and denying that the JDL's acts endangered Soviet Jews. The cables said they were convinced that the JDL's "policy and activities are most effective." The group also attacked Israeli authorities for alleged softness in fighting the Soviet Union on the issue of Jewish rights. One of the signatories, Dov Schperling, claimed that the recent cancellation of the Bolshoi Ballet's scheduled American tour was forced by the JDL and hailed it as the first public surrender by Soviet authorities to Jewish pressure. Herut leader Menachem Begin also declared support for acts of harassment against Soviet diplomatic establishments abroad.

On January 19, twenty JDL members had conducted a half-hour sit-in at the offices of Columbia Artists Inc. in Manhattan, leaving only after they were assured a meeting would be set up with the company's president in the near future.

On January 20, JDL national chairman Rabbi Meir Kahane announced that JDL would conduct "non-violent actions" against organizations engaged in cultural exchange programs with the Soviet Union and that there had been "unofficial contacts" between his group and "some Jewish establishment organizations", which were welcomed.

=== 1972–1974: Bombs, burglary and threats ===
On January 30, 1972, a violent protest involving approximately 1,000 anti-Nazi demonstrators, including 100 members of the Jewish Defense League, occurred outside the West Coast headquarters of the National Socialist White People's Party (NSWPP) (formerly the American Nazi Party) in El Monte, California, decorated in swastikas and whose presence irritated their neighbors. Joseph Tommasi, a local Nazi Party leader, lead sixty branch members in standing opposite them with rifles. The protest escalated into fistfights and the throwing of small explosives, rocks, and other objects at the building, resulting in dozens of arrests by law enforcement.

in February 1972, Rubin was arrested and charged for assault with intent to commit murder for allegedly shooting at Joseph Tommasi. All charges were dropped due to a lack of evidence.

In 1972, two JDL members were arrested and convicted of bomb possession and burglary in an attempt to blow up the Long Island residence of the Soviet Mission to the United Nations.

In 1972, a smoke bomb was planted in the Manhattan office of music impresario Sol Hurok, who organized Soviet performers' U.S. tours. Iris Kones, a Jewish secretary from Long Island, died of smoke inhalation, and Hurok and 12 others were injured and hospitalized. Jerome Zeller of the JDL was indicted for the bombing and Kahane later admitted his part in the attack. JDL activities were condemned by Moscow refuseniks who felt that the group's actions were making it less likely that the Soviet Union would relax restrictions on Jewish emigration.

In 1973, threatening phone calls made to the home of Ralph Riskin, one of the producers of Bridget Loves Bernie, resulted in the arrest of Robert S. Manning, described as a member of the JDL. Manning was later indicted on separate murder charges and fought extradition to the United States from Israel, where he had moved.

=== 1975–1979: Conspiracy to kidnap, bomb, and shipping arms ===
In 1975, JDL leader Meir Kahane was accused of conspiracy to kidnap a Soviet diplomat, bomb the Embassy of Iraq in Washington, D.C., and ship arms abroad from Israel. A hearing was held to revoke Kahane's probation for a 1971 incendiary device-making incident. He was found guilty of violating probation and served a one-year prison sentence. On December 31, 1975, 15 members of the League seized the office of the Permanent Observer of the Holy See to the United Nations in protest of Pope Paul VI's policy of support of Palestinian rights. The incident lasted one hour, after which the activists left the location at the local police's order, and no arrests were made.

On April 6, 1976, six prominent refuseniks—including Alexander Lerner, Anatoly Shcharansky, and Iosif Begun—condemned the JDL's anti-Soviet activities as terrorist acts, stating that their "actions constitute a danger for Soviet Jews ... as they might be used by the [Soviet] authorities as a pretext for new repressions and for instigating anti-Semitic hostilities."

On March 16, 1978, Irv Rubin, chairman of the JDL, said about the planned American Nazi Party march in Skokie, Illinois: "We are offering $500, that I have in my hand, to any member of the community ... who kills, maims or seriously injures a member of the American Nazi Party." Rubin was charged with solicitation of murder but was acquitted in 1981.

=== 1980–1984: Fire bombs, pipe bombs, and weapon caches ===
During the 1980s, past-JDL member Victor Vancier (who later founded the Jewish Task Force) and two other former JDL members were arrested in connection with six incidents: a 1984 firebombing of an automobile at a Soviet diplomatic residence, the 1985 and 1986 pipe bombings of rival JDL members' cars, the 1986 firebombing at a hall where the Soviet State Symphony Orchestra was performing, and two 1986 detonations of tear gas grenades to protest performances by Soviet dance troupes. In a 1984 interview, JDL leader Meir Kahane admitted that the JDL "bombed the Russian mission in New York, the Russian cultural mission here [Washington] in 1971, the Soviet trade offices." The attacks, which caused minor diplomatic crises in relations between the U.S. and the USSR, prompted the New York City Police Department (NYPD) to infiltrate the group; one undercover officer discovered a chain of weapon caches across Brooklyn containing "enough shotguns and rifles to arm a small militia."

In September 1981, the home of Boļeslavs Maikovskis, a former Latvian police officer and Nazi collaborator emigrated to the US, was bombed by the Jewish Defense League. JDL members had often been suspected of involvement in attacks against neo-Nazis, Holocaust deniers, and antisemites.

On October 26, 1981, after two firebombs damaged the Egyptian tourist office at Rockefeller Center, JDL chairman Meir Kahane said at a press conference: "I'm not going to say that the JDL bombed that office. There are laws against that in this country. But I'm not going to say I mourn for it either." The next day, after an anonymous caller claimed responsibility on behalf of the JDL, the group's spokesman later denied his group's involvement, but said, "We support the act."

=== 1985–1989: Murders ===
On October 11, 1985, Alex Odeh, regional director of the American-Arab Anti-Discrimination Committee (ADC), was killed in a mail bombing at his office in Santa Ana, California. Shortly before his killing, Odeh had appeared on the television show Nightline, engaging in a tense dialogue with a representative from the JDL. Irv Rubin immediately made several controversial public statements in reaction to the incident: "I have no tears for Mr. Odeh. He got exactly what he deserved. ... My tears were used up crying for Leon Klinghoffer." The Anti-Defamation League and the American Jewish Committee both condemned the murder. Four weeks after Odeh's death, FBI spokesperson Lane Bonner stated the FBI attributed the bombing and two others to the JDL. In February 1986, the FBI classified the bombing that killed Alex Odeh as a terrorist act. Rubin denied JDL involvement: "What the FBI is doing is simple. ... Some character calls up a news agency or whatever and uses the phrase Never Again... and on that assumption they can go and slander a whole group. That's tragic." In 1987, Floyd Clarke, then assistant director of the FBI, wrote in an internal memo that key suspects had fled to Israel and were living in the West Bank urban settlement of Kiryat Arba. In 1988, the FBI arrested Rochelle Manning as a suspect in the bombing, and also charged her husband, Robert Steven Manning, whom it considered a prime suspect in the attack; both were members of the JDL. Rochelle's jury deadlocked, and after the mistrial, she left for Israel to join her husband. Robert Manning was extradited from Israel to the U.S. in 1993. He was subsequently found guilty of involvement in the killing of the secretary of computer firm ProWest, Patricia Wilkerson, in another, unrelated mail bomb blast. He and other JDL members were suspected in various violent attacks through 1985, including a Boston ADC office bombing that injured two police officers, the killing of Nazi war criminal Tscherim Soobzokov in Paterson, New Jersey, and a bombing in Long Island targeting Elmars Sprogis that maimed a bystander. William Ross, another JDL member, was also found guilty for his participation in the bombing that killed Wilkerson. Rochelle Manning was re-indicted for her alleged involvement, and was detained in Israel, pending extradition, when she died of a heart attack in 1994.

=== 1990s: Attacks, extortion, and money laundering ===
When Ruthless Records recording artist and former N.W.A member Dr. Dre sought to work instead with Death Row Records, Ruthless Records executives Mike Klein and Jerry Heller were fearful of possible physical intimidation from Death Row Entertainment executives, including chief executive officer Suge Knight, and requested security assistance from the JDL. The FBI launched a money laundering investigation on the presumption that the JDL was extorting money from Ruthless Records and several rap artists, including Tupac Shakur and Eazy-E. Heller has speculated that the FBI did not investigate these threats because of the song "Fuck tha Police". Heller said, "It was no secret that in the aftermath of the Suge Knight shake down incident where Eazy was forced to sign over Dr. Dre, Michel'le and The D.O.C., that Ruthless was protected by Israeli-trained/connected security forces." The FBI documents refer to the JDL death threats and extortion scheme but do not make a direct connection between the group and the 1996 murder of Tupac Shakur.

In 1995, when the Toronto residence of the Holocaust denier Ernst Zündel was the target of an arson attack, a group calling itself the "Jewish Armed Resistance Movement" claimed responsibility; according to the Toronto Sun, the group had ties to the JDL and to Kahane Chai. The leader of the Toronto wing of the Jewish Defense League, Meir Halevi, denied involvement in the attack, although, just five days later, Halevi was caught trying to break into Zündel's property, where he was apprehended by police. In 2011, the Royal Canadian Mounted Police had launched an investigation against at least nine members of the JDL in regards to an anonymous tip that the JDL was plotting to bomb the Palestine House in Mississauga.

=== 2000s: Planned bomb attacks, firearms, suicide, assaults ===
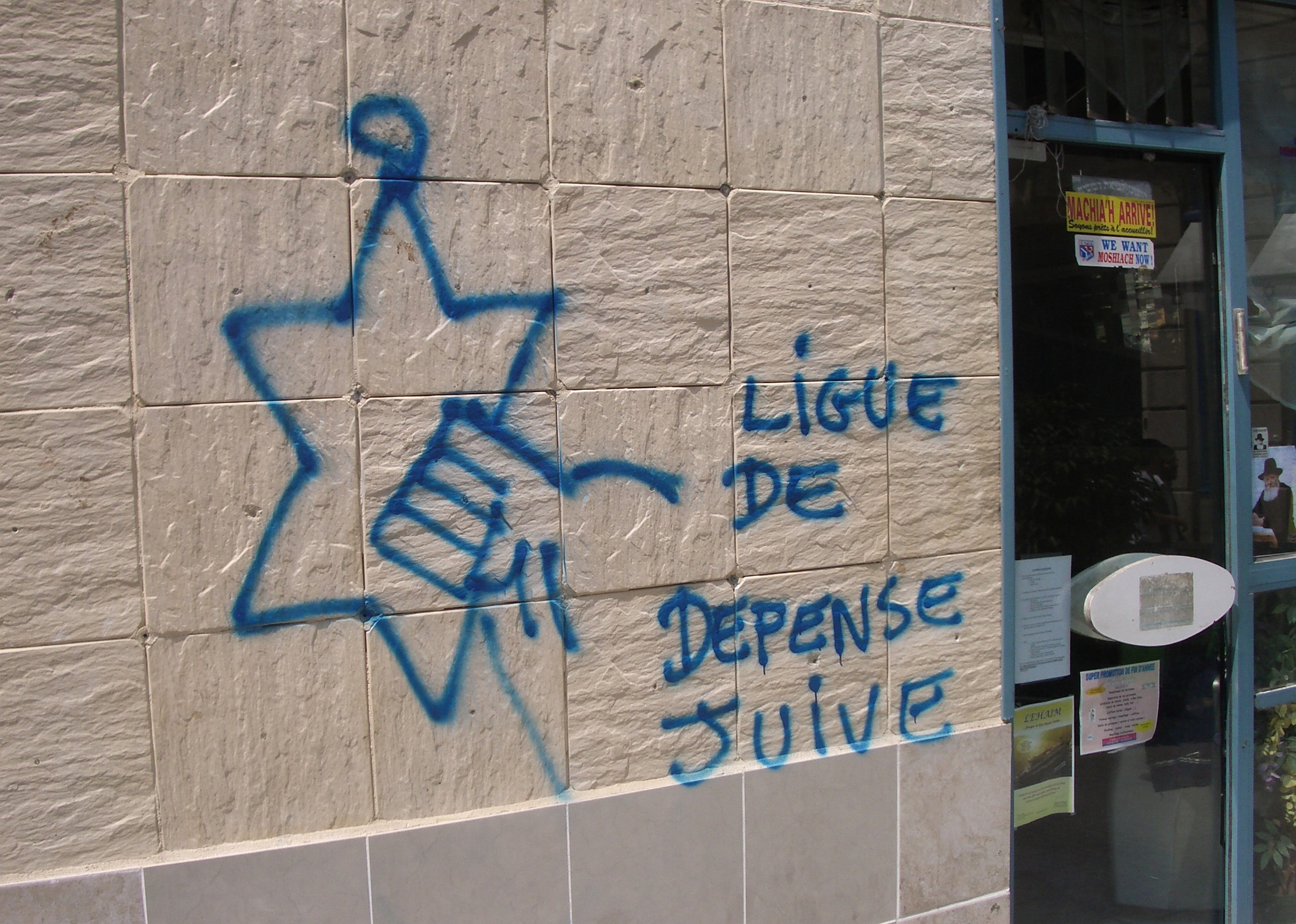
LDJ graffiti in the Marais neighbourhood in Paris. Picture taken on July 14, 2006, a little after the start of the 2006 Lebanon war.

On December 12, 2001, JDL leader Irv Rubin and JDL member Earl Krugel were charged with planning a series of bomb attacks against the Muslim Public Affairs Council in Los Angeles, the King Fahad Mosque in Culver City, California, and the San Clemente office of Arab-American Congressman Darrell Issa, in the wake of the September 11 attacks. Rubin, who also was charged with unlawful possession of an automatic firearm, claimed that he was innocent. On November 4, 2002, at the federal Metropolitan Detention Center in Los Angeles, Rubin slit his throat with a safety razor and jumped out of a third-story window. Rubin's suicide would be contested by his widow and the JDL, particularly after his co-defendant pleaded guilty to the charges and implicated Rubin in the plot. On February 4, 2003, Krugel pleaded guilty to conspiracy and weapons charges stemming from the plot and was expected to serve up to 20 years in prison. The core of the evidence against Krugel and Rubin was in a number of conversations taped by an informant, Danny Gillis, who was hired by the men to plant the bombs but who turned to the FBI instead. According to one tape, Krugel thought the attacks would serve as "a wakeup call" to Arabs. Krugel was subsequently murdered in prison by a fellow inmate in 2005.

In 2002, in France, attackers from Betar and Ligue de Défense Juive (LDJ) violently assaulted Jewish demonstrators from Peace Now, journalists, police officers (one of whom was stabbed), and Arab bystanders. At least two of the suspects in the 2010 murder of French Muslim Saïd Bourarach appeared to have ties to the French chapter of the JDL. In 2011, Israeli daily Haaretz reported members of the "French branch of Jewish terror group coming to Israel 'to defend settlements'."

=== 2010s: Frequent attacks in France, Trump inauguration ===
In 2013, a French Arab man was critically injured in a "revenge attack" by LDJ, sparking calls for further attacks against the Jews and a condemnation of the militant group by the French Jewish umbrella group CRIF; as of 2013, at least 115 violent incidents had been attributed to LDJ members since the group's registration in France in 2001, including many vigilante reprisals to antisemitic attacks. Earlier that year, two LDJ members were sentenced for an attack at a pro-Palestinian bookstore that injured two people, and an LDJ propaganda video called for "five cops for every Jew, 10 Arabs for each rabbi."

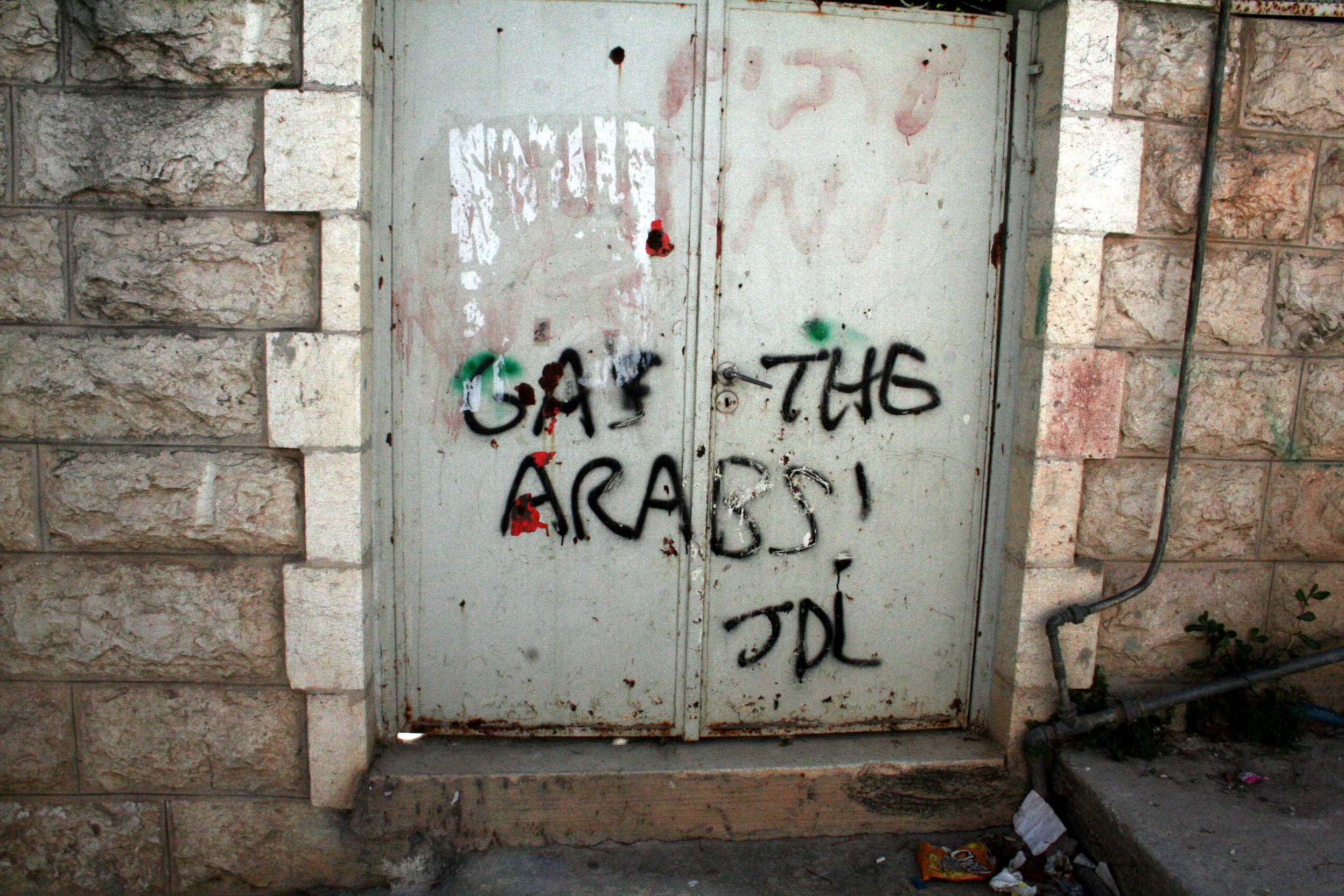
Graffiti in Hebron, in the Israeli-occupied West Bank, calling for the gassing of Arabs, above a tag for the right-wing group the Jewish Defense League

On February 22, 2014, France's LDJ published a eulogy ahead of the 25th anniversary of Cave of the Patriarchs massacre, praising and referred Goldstein as a "saint" and a "hero".

In June 2014, two LDJ supporters were sentenced to prison in France for targeting the car of Jonathan Moadab, the Jewish co-founder of the blog "Cercle des Volontaires (Circle of Volunteers)", with a home-made bomb in September 2012.

In October 2015, around 100 people with JDL flags and Israeli flags set off flares and attacked the Agence France-Presse building in Paris. Around 12 of them, armed with batons, assaulted David Perrotin, a leading French journalist. All were linked to the JDL.

On January 21, 2017, multiple members of the Jewish Defense League held a party during Donald Trump's presidential inauguration in an office building in New York City in Times Square, during which bagels and wine were present and Kiddush was recited.

=== 2020s: Protests, assualts, firebomb plot ===
After the October 7 attacks, Kahanist sentiments and the reemergence of the JDL in Canada and the United States with pro-Israel protests in the country showed people holding JDL logos and flags on YouTube, Facebook, and Twitter, with pro-Kahane and JDL content.

On November 12, 2023, during the March for the Republic and Against Antisemitism, members of the French JDL division, Ligue de Défense Juive, assaulted a person who was protesting against Marine Le Pen and attacked demonstrators from the Golem collective.

In May 2024, Rabbi Reuven Kahane, a relative of Meir Kahane, was arrested following an altercation with pro-Palestinian protesters in New York City, during which he was accused of assaulting a protester and striking a safety marshal with his car; however, all charges against him were later dismissed.

In July 2024, the Jewish Defense League member Robert Manning was released on parole after being sentenced to life for a 1980 bomb attack that killed Manhattan Beach secretary Patricia Wilkerson.

On the campus of the University of Toronto in September 2024, Eli Schwarz and Meir Weinstein were seen near a pro-Palestinian protest.

In March 2026, a member of the JDL 613 Brotherhood was arrested for an alleged plot to firebomb the home of pro-Palestinian activist Nerdeen Kiswani in New York. The JDL 613 Brotherhood, a New Jersey-based group founded in 2024, states they are inspired by the original JDL.

== Israel ==
Kahane made aliyah to Israel from the United States in September 1971 and initiated protests advocating the expulsion of Arabs from Israel and the Palestinian territories. In 1972, JDL leaflets were distributed around Hebron, calling for the mayor to stand trial for the 1929 Hebron massacre.

Flag of Kach and later Kahane Chai.

Kahane nominally led the JDL until April 1974. In 1971, he founded a political party, which later ran in the 1973 Israeli legislative election under the name "The League List". The party won 12,811 votes (0.82%), just 2,857 (0.18%) short of the 1% electoral threshold necessary for representation in the Knesset. Following the elections, the party's name was changed to Kach, taken from the Irgun motto, "Rak Kach" (רק כך, 'Only thus').

Kahane's popularity grew, with polls showing that Kach would have likely received three to four seats in the November 1988 elections, though some forecast as many as twelve seats, possibly making Kach the third-largest party.

On November 5, 1990, Kahane was assassinated after making a speech in New York City. The prime suspect, El Sayyid Nosair, an Egyptian-born American citizen, was subsequently acquitted of murder but convicted on gun possession charges. The Kach party subsequently split in two, with Binyamin Ze'ev Kahane (Meir Kahane's son) leading a breakaway faction, Kahane Chai. Both parties were banned from participating in the 1992 elections on the basis that they were followers of the original Kach. Binyamin Ze'ev Kahane and his wife, Talya, were shot and killed by allegedly Palestinian snipers on December 31, 2000.

On February 25, 1994, Baruch Goldstein, an American-born Israeli member of Kach, who in his youth was a JDL activist, opened fire on Muslims kneeling in prayer at the Cave of the Patriarchs mosque in the West Bank city of Hebron, killing 29 worshippers and injuring 125 before running out of ammunition and being killed. The attack set off riots and protests throughout the West Bank, and 19 Palestinians were killed by the Israel Defense Forces within 48 hours of the massacre. On its website, the JDL described the massacre as a "preventative measure against yet another Arab attack on Jews" and noted that it "d[id] not consider his assault to qualify under the label of terrorism". Furthermore, it noted the following:

We teach that violence is never a good solution but is unfortunately sometimes necessary as a last resort when innocent lives are threatened; we therefore view Dr. Goldstein as a martyr in Judaism's protracted struggle against Arab terrorism. And we are not ashamed to say that Goldstein was a charter member of the Jewish Defense League."

In a similar attack nearly twelve years earlier, on April 11, 1982, an American-born JDL member and immigrant to Israel named Alan Harry Goodman, opened fire with his military-issue rifle at the Dome of the Rock on the Temple Mount in Jerusalem, killing one Palestinian Arab and injuring four others. The 1982 shooting sparked an Arab riot in which another Palestinian was shot dead by the police. In 1983, Goodman was sentenced by an Israeli court to life in prison (which usually means 25 years in Israel); he was released after serving 15.5 years on the condition of returning to the United States.

== Terrorism and other illegal activities ==
In a 2004 congressional testimony, John S. Pistole, executive assistant director for counterterrorism and counterintelligence for the Federal Bureau of Investigation (FBI) described the JDL as "a known violent extremist Jewish organization." FBI statistics show that, from 1980 through 1985, there were 18 officially classified terrorist attacks in the U.S. committed by Jews; 15 of those by members of the JDL.

In its report, Terrorism 2000/2001, the FBI referred to the JDL as a "violent extremist Jewish organization" and stated that the FBI was responsible for thwarting at least one of its terrorist acts. The National Consortium for the Study of Terror and Responses to Terrorism states that, during the JDL's first two decades of activity, it was an "active terrorist organization."

JDL is suspected of being behind the 1972 bombing of the Manhattan offices of theater impresario Sol Hurok in which 1 employee was killed.

== Violent deaths ==
A number of senior JDL personnel and associates have died violently. Meir Kahane, the JDL's founding chairman, was assassinated in 1990 as was his son, Binyamin Ze'ev Kahane, in 2000. Long-time JDL chairman Irv Rubin died in 2002 in a Los Angeles federal detention center "after allegedly cutting his throat with a jail-issued razor and then jumping or falling over a railing and plummeting to his death." Rubin's deputy, Earl Krugel, was murdered by a fellow prison inmate and white supremacist in 2005. Rubin's son and JDL vice-chairman Ari Rubin committed suicide in 2012.

== Organization ==
=== Chairs ===
According to the organization's official list of Chairmen or Highest Ranking Directors:

- 1968–1971 – Rabbi Meir Kahane, International Chairman. Assassinated in 1990 by Islamic militant El Sayyid Nosair, who was later convicted of a terrorist conspiracy.
- 1971–1973 – David Fisch, a religious Columbia University student, who later wrote articles for Jewish magazines and the book Jews for Nothing.
- 1974–1976 – Russel Kelner, originally from Philadelphia. Formerly a U.S. Army lieutenant trained in counter-guerrilla warfare, he moved to New York City to direct the JDL's paramilitary summer camp JeDeL located in Wawarsing, New York, and later to run the national office as chairman.
- 1976–1978 – Bonnie Pechter.
- 1979–1981 – Brett Becker, originally from South Florida, came to New York City to become chairman.
- 1981–1983 – Meir Jolovitz, originally from Arizona, also came to New York City.
- 1983–1984 – Fern Sidman, administrative director.
- 1985–2002 – Irv Rubin, International Chairman. Arrested on terrorism charges; died in jail awaiting trial.
- 2002–present – Shelley Rubin, administrative director (2002–2006); Chairman/CEO (2006–present).
- 2017–present – Meir Weinstein, North American co-ordinator (2017–present); Canadian Chairman (1979–present)

=== Schism ===
After Rubin's death in prison in November 2002, Bill Maniaci was appointed interim chairman by Shelley Rubin. Two years later, the Jewish Defense League became mired in a state of upheaval over legal control of the organization. In October 2004, Maniaci rejected Shelley Rubin's call for him to resign; as a result, Maniaci was stripped of his title and membership. At that point, the JDL split into two separate factions, each vying for legal control of the associated "intellectual property." The two operated as separate organizations with the same name while a lengthy legal battle ensued. In April 2005, the original domain name of the organization, jdl.org, was suspended by Network Solutions due to allegations of infringement; the organization went back online soon thereafter at domain name jewishdefenseleague.org. In April 2006, news of a settlement was announced in which signatories agreed to not object to "Shelley Rubin's titles of permanent chairman and CEO of JDL." The agreement also confirmed that "the name 'Jewish Defense League,' the acronym 'JDL,' and the 'Fist and Star' logo are the exclusive intellectual property of JDL." (Opponents of both groups claim that these are Kahanist symbols and not the exclusive property of JDL. At this time, however, the logo is no longer in general use by the Kahanist groups.) The agreement also states: "Domain names registered on behalf of JDL, including but not limited to jdl.org and jewishdefenseleague.org, are owned and operated by JDL." Meanwhile, the opposing group formed B'nai Elim, which is the latest of many JDL splinter groups to have formed over the years (previous splinter groups included the Jewish Direct Action and the United Jewish Underground that have been active during the 1980s).

=== Principles ===
The JDL upholds five fundamental principles

- "LOVE OF JEWRY, one Jewish people, indivisible and united, from which flows the love for and the feeling of pain of all Jews."
- "DIGNITY AND PRIDE, pride in and knowledge of Jewish tradition, faith, culture, land, history, strength, pain and peoplehood."
- "IRON, the need to both move to help Jews everywhere and to change the Jewish image through sacrifice and all necessary means—even strength, force and violence."
- "DISCIPLINE AND UNITY, the knowledge that he (or she) can and will do whatever must be done, and the unity and strength of willpower to bring this into reality."
- "FAITH IN THE INDESTRUCTIBILITY OF THE JEWISH PEOPLE, faith in the greatness and indestructibility of the Jewish people, our religion and our Land of Israel."

The JDL encourages, per its principle of the "Love of Jewry," that "... in the end ... the Jew can look to no one but another Jew for help and that the true solution to the Jewish problem is the liquidation of the Exile and the return of all Jews to Eretz Yisroel – the land of Israel." The JDL elaborates on this fundamental principle by insisting upon an "immediate need to place Judaism over any other 'ism' and ideology and ... use of the yardstick: 'Is it good for Jews?'" The JDL argues that, outside of Jews, there are historically no people corresponding to the Palestinian ethnicity. Writing on its official website, the JDL claims: "[T]he first mention of a 'Palestinian people' dates from the aftermath of the 1967 war, when the local Arabic-speaking communities ... were retrospectively endowed with a contrived 'nationhood' ... taken from Jewish history ..." and that "[c]learly, since Roman times 'Palestinian' had meant Jews until the Arab's recent adoption of this identity in order to claim it as their land." On this basis, the JDL argues that "Zionism [should be] under no obligation to accommodate a separate 'Palestinian' claim, there being no historical evidence or witness for any such Arab category," and it considers Palestinian claims to be "Arab usurpation" of proper Jewish title.

== Relations with other groups ==
In 1971, Kahane aligned the JDL with the Italian-American Civil Rights League, created the previous year by the Italian American mob boss Joseph Colombo, head of the Colombo crime family. In 2011, the Canadian JDL organized a "support rally" for the English Defence League (EDL) featuring a live speech, via Skype, by EDL leader Tommy Robinson. The event was denounced and condemned by the Canadian Jewish Congress (CJC) leader Bernie Farber and general counsel Benjamin Shinewald. The rally, held at the Toronto Zionist Centre, attracted a counter-protest organized by Anti-Racist Action (ARA) resulting in four ARA members being arrested. The JDL Canada has also organized rallies in support of right-wing Israeli politician Moshe Feiglin and Dutch politician and well-known Islam critic Geert Wilders of the Party for Freedom, and announced its support for the increasingly anti-Islamic Freedom Party of Austria.

Rav Yehuda HaKohen, a leader in the Hebrew Universalist VISION movement, is a former JDL member and has cited Kahanism as an inspiration behind his ideological beliefs.

== See also ==
- Golus nationalism
- Jewish Defense Organization
- Jewish terrorism
