= Earl Krugel =

Jewish Defense League activist

Earl Leslie Krugel
- Born: November 24, 1942; Detroit, Michigan, U.S.
- Died: November 4, 2005 (aged 62); FCI Phoenix, Phoenix, Arizona, U.S.
- Cause of death: Murdered by another inmate
- Occupation: Jewish Defense League activist
- Spouse: Lola
- Motive: Anti-Arab terrorism
- Conviction: Guilty plea
- Criminal charges: Federal terrorism. Conspiracy to bomb a mosque, the offices of US Congressman Darrell Issa (R-Calif.), and the offices of the Muslim Public Affairs Council
- Penalty: 20 year prison sentence

Earl Leslie Krugel (November 24, 1942 – November 4, 2005) was the coordinator of the Jewish Defense League in the Western United States. In 2005, he was sentenced to prison on charges of terrorism after he confessed to plotting, with the group's leader Irv Rubin, to blow up the office of Arab-American congressman Darrell Issa and the King Fahd mosque in Culver City, California. He was kept in protective custody for three years for the 2001 bomb plot. Following his sentencing, he was transferred to a medium-security federal prison. Three days later, another prisoner killed Krugel by striking him in the head with a block of concrete.

== Life ==
At one time, Krugel worked as a dental assistant in California's San Fernando Valley. He had been active with the Jewish Defense League since its founding in 1968.

In November 2001, he was arrested at his home in California after receiving a delivery of gunpowder. Bomb components including pipes, end caps, detonators and gunpowder were confiscated along with multiple rifles and handguns. In December 2001 Krugel and Rubin were arraigned on conspiracy charges to send explosives to the Sherman Oaks office of U.S. congressman Darrell Issa, a Lebanese-American, and to bomb the King Fahd Mosque in Culver City. According to the affidavit in support of the charges, Krugel had stated to an FBI informant that "Arabs needed a wake-up call and the JDL needed to do something to one of their 'filthy mosques'. According to the San Francisco Chronicle the affidavit also "painted a picture of a tiny gang that sat around talking about what to blow up but generally shied away from blowing up people".

In 2003, the bombing charges were dropped and Krugel was allowed to plead guilty to reduced charges of conspiracy to violate civil rights, and to a weapons charge. U.S. District Court Judge Ronald S.W. Lew accepted the plea. Part of the plea agreement demanded that Krugel reveal the names of all JDL activists involved in the 1985 bombing of Alex Odeh's office. The plea agreement was later retracted with details sealed to the public. He was sentenced to 20 years in prison in September 2005.

== Imprisonment and death ==
On November 4, 2005, at the Federal Correctional Institution in Phoenix, Arizona, Krugel, BOP# 20966-112, was murdered by a member of the Aryan Brotherhood, who used a concrete block to strike his head. Krugel had been at the medium security prison for just three days.

The suspect, David Frank Jennings, 30, who was serving a 70-month sentence for robbing a bank in Las Vegas in 2003, attacked Krugel from behind with a piece of concrete hidden in a bag while Krugel was using an exercise machine, delivering multiple blows to his skull, face and neck. Krugel suffered multiple skull fractures, internal bleeding and multiple lacerations to his head, face and brain. The beating knocked out teeth and also fractured one of his eye sockets. Krugel was pronounced dead at the scene.

In 2007, Jennings pleaded guilty to second-degree murder. In 2008, he had 35 years added to his sentence.
