= Kahanism =

Ideology based on Meir Kahane

Flag of Kach, used by Kahanists

Kahanism (Hebrew: [ka.haˈn.izm]; Hebrew: כַּהַנִּיזְם) is a religious Zionist ideology based on the views of Rabbi Meir Kahane, founder of the Jewish Defense League and the Israeli political party Kach. Kahane believed that most Arabs living in Israel are the enemies of Jews and Israel itself, and that a Jewish, Halakhic state, in which non-Jews would have no voting rights, should be created.

The Kach party has been banned by the Israeli government. In 2004, the United States Department of State designated it a Foreign Terrorist Organization. In 2022, it was removed from the US terror blacklist due to "insufficient evidence" of the group's ongoing activity, but it remains a Specially Designated Global Terrorist entity.

The Kahanist Otzma Yehudit party won six seats in the 2022 Israeli legislative election and is a member of the thirty-seventh government of Israel, save for a withdrawal between 21 January and 19 March 2025 because the government had agreed to the January 2025 ceasefire in the Gaza war. The party, and the Kahanist movement as a whole, have been accused of espousing Jewish supremacy and fascism.

== History ==
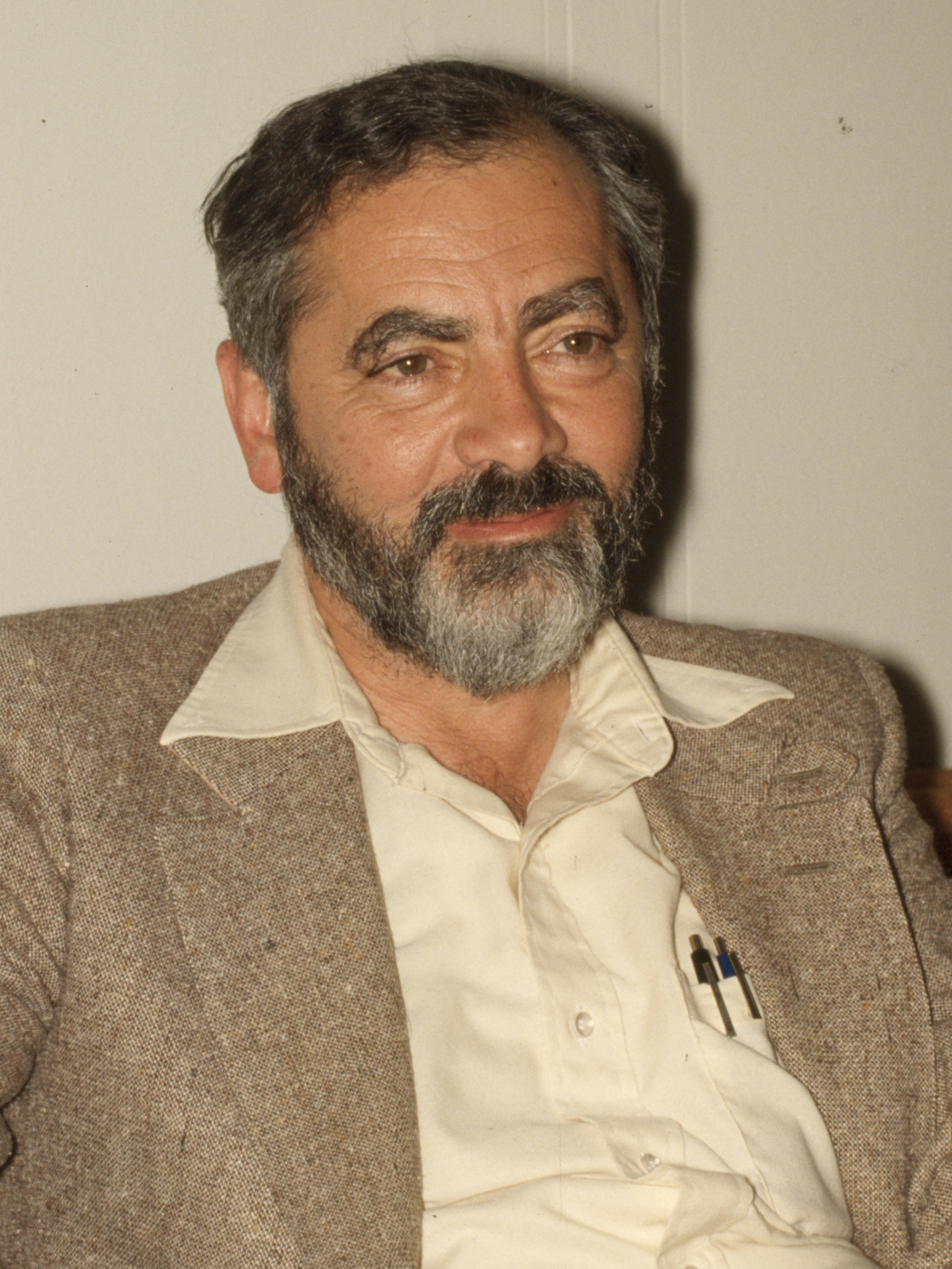
Meir Kahane, after whom Kahanism is named

The Kach party saw electoral success in 1984, winning 26,000 votes, equivalent to one seat. Early polls after the election predicted that the Kach party would become the third-largest party, winning as many as 12 seats in the next election. In August 1985, the Kach party was barred from participating in elections. Some Kahanist groups, such as the Sicarii, began pursuing their political goals through violent means instead. On November 5, 1990, Meir Kahane was assassinated by El-Sayyid A. Nosair, who was associated with terror cells that eventually became al-Qaeda.

Kahane's assassination led to the splintering of the Kach party, with Binyamin Ze'ev Kahane leading Kahane Chai from Kfar Tapuach and Kach led by Baruch Marzel, who eventually became a member of Otzma Yehudit. In 1992, both groups were permanently banned from participating in elections. In 1994, due to the Cave of the Patriarchs massacre committed by Baruch Goldstein, they were declared illegal terrorist organizations by the Israeli government. After the ban, Kahane Chai's leaders created an extraparliamentary advocacy group, "The Kahane Movement", which archived media content from Kahane online.

The next election where Kahanists received political representation was in 2009, with Michael Ben-Ari, who ran on the National Union ticket. Ben-Ari split from the National Union after the election, forming Otzma Yehudit. Otzma Yehudit failed to pass the electoral threshold in the 2013 Israeli election.

Kahanism gained no political legitimacy until the April 2019 Israeli election. As a result of the 2018–2022 Israeli political crisis, Prime Minister Benjamin Netanyahu attempted to gain seats by appealing to Kahanist voters by making a deal with the Jewish Home party to have them run on a joint list with Otzma Yehudit as the Union of Right-Wing Parties. The party received enough seats for Otzma Yehudit to be represented, but Ben Ari, who was supposed to represent the fifth slot on the Union of Right-Wing Parties list, was barred from running after the list was submitted. Otzma Yehudit eventually achieved parliamentary representation in 2021, when Itamar Ben-Gvir won a seat as part of a joint list with the Religious Zionist Party.

Otzma Yehudit won six seats in the 2022 Israeli legislative election, forming what has been called the most right-wing government in Israeli history. In November 2022, after a memorial event for Kahane attended by Ben-Gvir, the U.S. State Department hosted a press briefing, saying, "Celebrating the legacy of a terrorist organization is abhorrent. There is no other word for it. It is abhorrent." The party left the coalition on 21 January 2025 because the government had agreed to a ceasefire in the Gaza war. That ceasefire collapsed on 18 March, and the party rejoined the government the next day.

== Ideology ==
Kahanism is a religious Zionist ideology that denotes the controversial positions espoused by Rabbi Meir Kahane. Kahane proposed that the State of Israel should enforce a law under which non-Jews who wish to dwell in Israel could remain in the country only as "resident strangers" with all rights but national ones.

Kahanism's central claim is that the vast majority of the Arabs of Israel are and will continue to be enemies of Jews and Israel itself, and that a Jewish theocratic state, governed by Halakha law, absent of a voting non-Jewish population that includes Israel, Palestine, areas of modern-day Egypt, Jordan, Lebanon, Syria and Iraq, should be created.

Kahanism has controversially been described as a form of fascism by news outlets and organizations such as Haaretz, the Institute for Middle East Understanding, and +972 Magazine. Israeli scholar Ehud Sprinzak has described Kahanism as "quasi-fascism" due to its overt racism. According to Susannah Heschel, "as Trumpism becomes the new American identity, Kahanism is the new Jewish identity".

Kahane denied these allegations throughout his life, instead calling his opponents "leftists" and "fascists". He likened his struggle for an ethnically pure Israel to the Jewish people's struggle against fascist powers during the Holocaust. Historian Matthew N. Lyons argued that Kahanism's religious fundamentalism could be more accurately described as "religious nationalism".

== Criticism and legal action ==
Since 1985, the Israeli government has outlawed political parties espousing Kahane's ideology as racist, and forbids their participation in the government. The Kach party was banned from running for the Knesset in 1988, while the two Kahanist movements formed after Kahane's assassination in 1990 were ruled illegal terrorist organizations in 1994 and the groups subsequently disbanded. Followers with militant Kahanist beliefs remain active, as listed below. In 2001, the Office of the United Nations High Commissioner for Human Rights called the official Kahanist website a hate site, saying it espoused prejudiced views in which "Arabs generally and Palestinians in particular are vilified".

=== U.S. terror designation ===
The United States added Kahane Chai to its Foreign Terrorist Organizations list in 1997.

In 2004, the U.S. State Department designated Kach a Foreign Terrorist Organization. In 2022, it was removed from the U.S. terror blacklist due to "insufficient evidence" of the group's ongoing activity in the most recent five-yearly review, but it remains a Specially Designated Global Terrorist (SDGT) entity.

=== Canadian terror designation ===
The Canadian government has listed Kahane Chai (Kach) as a terrorist entity since 2005.

In February 2025, Eli Schwarz, a self-confessed member of Kahane Chai, was arrested and charged with making threats at a demonstration in Toronto. Police seized clothing branded with the Kahane Chai name and crest, a soft-body armour vest, a rifle, a scope, and ammunition from his residence.

== Kahanist groups ==
Name	Country	Description	Status
Kach and Kahane Chai	Israel	Original political parties	Defunct
Jewish Defense League	Global	Militant activist organization, founded by Kahane	Active
Terror Against Terror	Israel	Militant group	Defunct
Sicarii	Israel	Militant student group founded in 1989	Defunct
Lehava	Israel	Activist organization	Active
Jewish Task Force	US	US based Kahanist media organization	Active
Otzma Yehudit	Israel	Political party	Active
Jewish National Front	Israel	Political party	Defunct
Hatikva	Israel	Political party	Defunct
Jewish Defense Organization	US	Militant self defense organization	Defunct

== Notable Kahanists ==
=== Baruch Goldstein ===
The deadliest Jewish terrorist attack occurred when Baruch Goldstein, supporter of Kach, shot and killed 29 Muslim worshipers, and wounded another 150, at the Cave of the Patriarchs massacre in Hebron, in 1994. This was described as a case of Jewish religious terrorism by Mark Juergensmeyer. Goldstein was a medical doctor who grew up in Brooklyn and was educated at the Albert Einstein College of Medicine in the Bronx. He resettled in the Kiryat Arba settlement in the West Bank, and was politically active for years. Goldstein saw Kahane as a hero, and was Kahane's campaign manager when he ran for the Israeli parliament through the Kach party. When Goldstein was threatened with a court-martial for refusing to treat non-Jewish soldiers in the Israeli Defence Force, he declared: "I am not willing to treat any non-Jew. I recognize as legitimate only two religious authorities: Maimonides and Kahane."

Goldstein was denounced "with shocked horror" by Orthodox Jews, and most Israelis denounced Goldstein as insane. Israeli prime minister Yitzhak Rabin condemned the attack, calling Goldstein a "degenerate murderer", "a shame on Zionism and an embarrassment to Judaism". At the same time, Goldstein's actions were praised by some extremist settlers; Yochay Ron said that he "felt good" when he heard the news, and also said that Jews were "at war with the Arabs" and "all Arabs who live here are a danger to us... they threaten the very existence of the Jewish community on the West Bank." Goldstein and other religious settlers at Beit Hadassah (both Kahanist and Gush Emunim) believe that the biblical lands on the West Bank are sacred, that Jews are required by God to occupy them, and that the presence of Muslims desecrates the Holy Land. After this attack, members of the Kach Party praised Goldstein's actions, and in the ensuing political turmoil, the Knesset banned Kach in Israel. The Shamgar Commission concluded that Goldstein acted alone.

=== Yoel Lerner ===
In October 1982, Yoel Lerner, a member of Kahane's Kach, attempted to blow up the Dome of the Rock in order to rebuild the Temple Mount site. He was sentenced to two and a half years in prison. Mark Juergensmeyer identified him as a Jewish religious terrorist, writing that he "yearned for a Jewish society in Israel. He hoped for the restoration of the ancient temple in Jerusalem, the exclusive right of Jews to settle on the West Bank of the Jordan River, and the creation of a state based on biblical law." Lerner had previously served a three-year sentence for heading a group that plotted to overthrow the government and establish a state based upon religious law.

=== Eden Natan-Zada ===
On August 4, 2005, Eden Natan-Zada, an AWOL Israel Defense Forces soldier, killed four Israeli Arab citizens and wounded several others when he opened fire on a bus in the northern Israeli town of Shfaram. Natan-Zada had recently moved to the settlement of Tapuach, site of a Kahanist yeshiva. He was handcuffed by Israeli police, then lynched by a mob.

== Alleged Kahanist violence ==
Roadside shootings, stabbings and grenade attacks against Palestinians have been carried out in Jerusalem and the West Bank by individuals or groups suspected of having ties to the former Kach group. Aliases such as "The Committee for the Safety of the Roads", "The Sword of David" and "The Repression of Traitors" have been used. The US government claims that these are all aliases of "Kach". In 2002, a Kahanist group known as "Revenge of the Toddlers" claimed responsibility for a bombing attack at Tzur Baher, an East Jerusalem secondary school for Arab boys, that wounded seven. The group also claimed responsibility for the 2003 bombing of a Palestinian school in Jaba that injured 20 and was also thought to be linked to the 2002 Zil Elementary school bombing.

== Non-Jewish support ==
James David Manning, chief pastor of ATLAH World Missionary Church, has endorsed aspects of Kahane's ideology.

== Sources ==
- Juergensmeyer, Mark (2003). Terror in the Mind of God: The Global Rise of Religious Violence. University of California Press. ISBN 978-0-520-24011-7.
