= Binyamin Ze'ev Kahane =

Israeli rabbi and activist (1966–2000)

- בנימין זאב כהנא
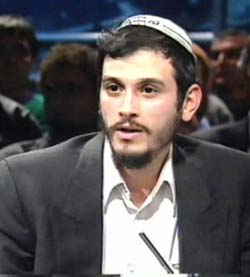
- Born: 3 October 1966; New York City, U.S.
- Died: 31 December 2000 (aged 34); Ofra, West Bank
- Cause of death: Murder (gunshot wounds)
- Resting place: Jerusalem
- Citizenship: Israeli; American
- Education: Yeshiva
- Occupations: Rabbi, MK
- Known for: Kahane Chai
- Spouse: Talia Kahane
- Children: 6
- Father: Meir HaCohen Kahane

Binyamin Ze'ev Kahane or Benyamin Zeev Kahane, sometimes called Benjamin Ze’ev Kahana (Hebrew: בנימין זאב כהנא; 3 October 1966 – 31 December 2000) was an American and Israeli Orthodox far-right rabbi and follower of his father Meir Kahane, who started the ultra-nationalist Zionist ideology called Kahanism. He was assassinated in 2000. His assassination is suspected to have been carried out by Palestinian militants part of the Force 17.

== Life ==
Born in New York City, he emigrated to Israel with his family at the age of four, in 1971. He was a young Israeli Orthodox Jewish scholar and rabbi who was most famous for his leadership of Kahane Chai, a far-right political party that broke from his father's Kach party after Meir Kahane's assassination in 1990. He was convicted several times by Israeli courts for advocating violence against Arabs.

Kahane was the author of The Haggada of the Jewish Idea, a commentary based on his father's teachings of the Passover Haggadah read at the Passover Seder. He wrote a Torah portion sheet called Darka Shel Torah ("The Way of the Torah") that was distributed for the weekly Torah portions.

== Death ==
Kahane and his wife Talia were shot and killed near the Israeli settlement of Ofra on 31 December 2000. The ambush took place on road 60 about 15 kilometres (9 1/2 miles) north of Jerusalem, just before the town of Ofra. Five of the couple's six children were in the van when they were hit by automatic rifle fire. Binyamin (the driver) was killed, and the vehicle went out of control and smashed into a wall. His wife Talia died in the ambulance on the way to the hospital in Jerusalem.

The Prime Minister's Office subsequently announced the arrest of three members of Force 17 – Talal Ghassan, Marzouk Abu Naim, and Na'man Nofel – who were believed to have carried out the attack under the instruction of PLO leader Col. Mahmoud Damra. However, in 2007, Khaled Shawish was arrested for the attack.

== See also ==
- Kfar Tapuach
- Kahanism
- Yeshivat HaRaayon HaYehudi
