= Irv Rubin =

American Jewish activist (1945–2002)

- Born: Irving David Rubin; April 12, 1945; Montreal, Canada
- Died: November 13, 2002 (aged 57); Los Angeles, California, U.S.
- Cause of death: Suicide by jumping
- Occupation: Activist
- Spouse: Shelley Rubin
- Military career
- Branch: United States Air Force
- Rank: Sergeant

Irving David Rubin (April 12, 1945 – November 13, 2002) was a Canadian-born American political and religious activist who served as chairman of the Jewish Defense League (JDL) from 1985 to 2002. He committed suicide in jail when awaiting trial on charges of conspiracy to bomb private and government property.

== Early life and activism ==
Irving David Rubin was born in Montreal, Quebec, on April 12, 1945. He and his parents and sister moved to Granada Hills, California, a neighbourhood of Los Angeles, which has a large Jewish population. He became a United States citizen and served as a sergeant in the United States Air Force. He was a staunch supporter of the right to keep and bear arms.

== Jewish Defense League activism ==
Rubin became the successor to JDL founder Rabbi Meir Kahane, after Kahane moved to Israel in 1985 and formed the Kach Party, which was eventually outlawed by the Israeli government as racist.

In February 1972, Rubin was arrested and charged for assault with intent to commit murder for allegedly shooting at Joseph Tommasi, a local neo-Nazi and member of the American Nazi Party. All charges were dropped due to a lack of evidence. In September of that year, Rubin was arrested with 5 others due to a suspicion they had bombed an apartment in Hollywood that had an Arab man as a tenant. In 1978, Rubin offered a $500 bounty to anyone who would wound or kill a member of the American Nazi Party. Indicted on solicitation of murder charges, he was acquitted in 1981.

In 1985, it was reported that Rubin said about the bombing of the home of historian and Holocaust denier Dr. George Ashley, "It's too bad that Mr. Ashley wasn't blown up" and "I applaud those who took such actions. I think these people have a righteous place in the world." Moderate Jews also criticized him. Rob Eshman, the Editor-in-Chief of the Jewish Journal of Greater Los Angeles commented: "In the solar system of Jewish life, Irv Rubin is Pluto", and asserted "Here in Los Angeles, for years now Rubin has been escorted out of far more Jewish events than he's ever been invited in to."

In 1985, Alex Odeh, the local chairman of the pro-Palestinian American-Arab Anti-Discrimination Committee (ADC) was killed by a bomb while opening the door to his Santa Ana, California office. Rubin was suspected, and further antagonized his opponents by saying that "Odeh got what he deserved." However, the JDL insisted the attack was committed by others. The FBI was unable to prove its original allegations. The crime remains unsolved. The investigation of Rubin was headed by FBI special agent Mary Hogan, the same agent who signed the affidavit accusing Rubin of planning to destroy government property and other targets in 2001.

Before joining the Libertarian Party in 2000, Irv Rubin was an active Republican, and served as a page at the 1964 Republican National Convention, at which Barry Goldwater was nominated to run for the presidency.

Rubin's joining the Libertarian Party was greeted with shock by many members because of the allegations of terrorism against both the JDL and Rubin himself. Membership requires a pledge to not "initiate force." In June 2001, Rubin let it be known that he was considering running for governor of California on the Libertarian ticket, renewing controversies among libertarians.

In an attempt to disrupt the events, Rubin regularly attended rallies held by the Ku Klux Klan and Aryan Nations. He was regularly assisted by some of his followers. During the civil suit brought by the SPLC against Aryan Nations founder and Pastor Richard Butler held in Coeur d' Alene, Idaho, in 2000, Rubin stayed for at least 4 days holding vigil during the proceedings. He frequently spoke out against Butler and his followers who were also holding vigil.

== Appearances on television ==
Rubin made a number of televised appearances during his lifetime. These include a lively 1988 debate on Crossfire with black nationalist Steve Cokely, shortly following a controversial lecture that Cokely gave in which he stated his belief that Jewish doctors were inoculating black babies with the HIV virus; appearing on the History Channel documentary Nazi America: A Secret History; and an October 22, 1997 appearance on the Jerry Springer Show, in which he and his bodyguards scuffled with members of the Ku Klux Klan after he attacked a member of the KKK who mocked him by removing his hood to reveal a yarmulke. One of the more celebrated debates that Rubin had was with Klansman and founder of the White Aryan Resistance Tom Metzger on KDOC Channel 56's Hot Seat with Wally George. The debate was cut off after Rubin threw a cup of water in Metzger's face. Security intervened and police were called.

== Organized crime ==
The FBI suspected Rubin of running a protection racket against Los Angeles rappers including Tupac Shakur and Eazy-E, issuing threats and then offering to protect the rappers. He was involved in a cross-country grand theft auto racket where new Honda Accords would be stolen from ports on the East Coast, driven across country, and sold for $12,000. Several of Rubin's associates were implicated in an FBI sting called "Operation Stow Biz" concerning extortion with moving companies.

== 2001 conspiracy charges ==
On December 12, 2001, Rubin and Earl Krugel, a member of the JDL, were charged with conspiracy to bomb private and government property. The two allegedly were caught in the act of planning bomb attacks against the King Fahd Mosque in Culver City, California, and on the office of U.S. Representative Darrell Issa (R-CA), who is a Christian of Lebanese and Czech descent. The two were arrested as part of a sting operation after an FBI informant named Danny Gillis delivered explosives to Krugel's home in Los Angeles.

The JDL claims that Danny Gillis struck a deal with the FBI to neutralize the JDL by infiltrating the organization and by arranging criminal charges of its leadership. However, according to the Jewish Journal of Los Angeles, Gillis was a former JDL member who joined the organization due to conflicts with white skinheads. According to journalist David Sheen, Rubin via his attorney Mark Werksman, offered one of Rubin's disgruntled criminal associates "Moshe V" $50,000 to kill Gillis.

On February 4, 2003, Earl Krugel, Rubin's first lieutenant, pleaded guilty to conspiracy charges stemming from the plot. This plea was later withdrawn by the presiding Judge, and he was charged with additional crimes which, if convicted, could result in a 55-year imprisonment in a federal penitentiary. The plea bargain was apparently reinstated in late September 2005, and the 62-year-old Krugel was sentenced to 20 years in federal detention, after an initial plea agreement based on his revealing the names of those involved in the Alex Odeh bomb plot was withdrawn. On November 4, 2005, he was killed after being transferred to a Phoenix federal prison. Another inmate struck Krugel on the head from behind with a cement block.

== Suicide in prison ==
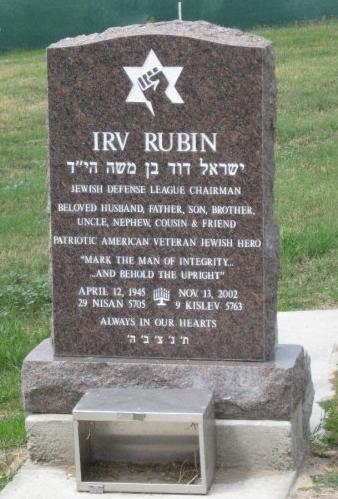
Rubin's tombstone in Los Angeles

In November 2002, while imprisoned at the Metropolitan Detention Center in Los Angeles awaiting trial, Rubin allegedly cut his own throat and then jumped off an 18–20-foot (5.5–6-meter) balcony. He had been threatening suicide in the days before. The injuries from the fall resulted in his death at Los Angeles County General Hospital several days later.

Rubin's wife demanded an investigation. Defense attorney Mark Werksman said that Rubin had been despondent for months, losing 40 pounds (18 kilograms), and that the pressure of an upcoming trial "may have pushed him over the top." The Rubin family launched a wrongful death suit against the government.
