= Baruch Goldstein =

American-Israeli mass murderer (1956–1994)

- ברוך גולדשטיין
- Born: Benjamin Carl Goldstein; December 9, 1956; Brooklyn, New York, U.S.
- Died: February 25, 1994 (aged 37); Cave of the Patriarchs, Hebron, Israeli-occupied West Bank
- Cause of death: Beating
- Education: Yeshiva University; Albert Einstein College
- Occupation: Physician
- Known for: Cave of the Patriarchs massacre
- Motive: Anti-Palestinian racism, Zionist extremism

Details
- Date: February 25, 1994
- Location: West Bank
- Killed: 29
- Injured: 125
- Weapon: IMI Galil

Baruch Kopel Goldstein (Hebrew: ברוך קאפל גולדשטיין; born Benjamin Carl Goldstein; December 9, 1956 – February 25, 1994) was an American-Israeli physician and religious extremist who, in 1994, murdered 29 Palestinians in Hebron in the Israeli-occupied West Bank, an incident of Jewish terrorism. Goldstein was a supporter of Kach, a religious Zionist party that the United States, the European Union and other countries designate as a terrorist organization. Kach was banned less than a month after Goldstein's attacks on account of statements made in support of his actions.

Born in 1956 in the Brooklyn borough of New York City, to an Orthodox Jewish family, Goldstein received his education there, starting with Jewish scripture studies, and eventually studying medicine at Yeshiva University. In the United States, he was a member of the Jewish Defense League (JDL), a militant Jewish organization founded by his boyhood acquaintance Meir Kahane. In 1983, Goldstein immigrated to Israel, and served as a physician in the Israeli military, during which he refused to treat Arabs, including those serving as soldiers. Later, he worked as a physician, and lived in the Israeli settlement of Kiryat Arba near Hebron in the Israeli-occupied West Bank. Goldstein was active in Kahane's Kach party, and was third on the party list for the Knesset during the 1984 elections.

On February 25, 1994, Goldstein dressed in an Israeli military uniform, entered a mosque in the Cave of the Patriarchs and opened fire on the 800 Palestinian Muslim worshippers praying there during the month of Ramadan, killing 29 and wounding 125 worshippers, until he was beaten to death by survivors.

Goldstein's gravesite became a pilgrimage site for Jewish extremists. The following words are inscribed on the tomb: "He gave his life for the people of Israel, its Torah and land." In 1999, after the passing of Israeli legislation outlawing monuments to terrorists, the Israeli Army dismantled the shrine that had been built to Goldstein at the site of his interment. The tombstone and its epitaph, calling Goldstein a martyr with clean hands and a pure heart, was left untouched. After the flagstones around it were removed, the ground was covered with gravel.

== Early life and education ==
Goldstein was born on December 9, 1956, as Benjamin Goldstein in Brooklyn, New York, to an Orthodox Jewish family. He attended the Yeshiva of Flatbush religious day school. He studied medicine at Yeshiva University, receiving a medical degree from the Albert Einstein College of Medicine. He belonged to the Jewish Defense League (JDL), a militant Jewish organization founded by his boyhood acquaintance Meir Kahane.

== Immigration to Israel ==
Goldstein immigrated to Israel in 1983. He served as a physician in the Israel Defense Forces (IDF), first as a conscript, then in the reserve forces. Following the end of his active duty, Goldstein worked as a physician, and lived in the Israeli settlement of Kiryat Arba near Hebron, where he worked as an emergency doctor, and was involved in treating victims of Arab-Israeli violence. He changed his name from Benjamin to Baruch, married a Soviet immigrant named Miriam, and had four children. Israeli press reports claimed that Goldstein refused to treat Arabs, even Arab soldiers serving in the IDF, believing it was against Jewish laws to treat non-Jews even for payment. This was also reflected in comments by his acquaintances. Goldstein was active in Kahane's Kach party, and was third on the party list for the Knesset during the 1984 elections. He compared Israel's democracy to the Nazi regime, and often wore a yellow star with the word JUDE on it.

== Massacre ==
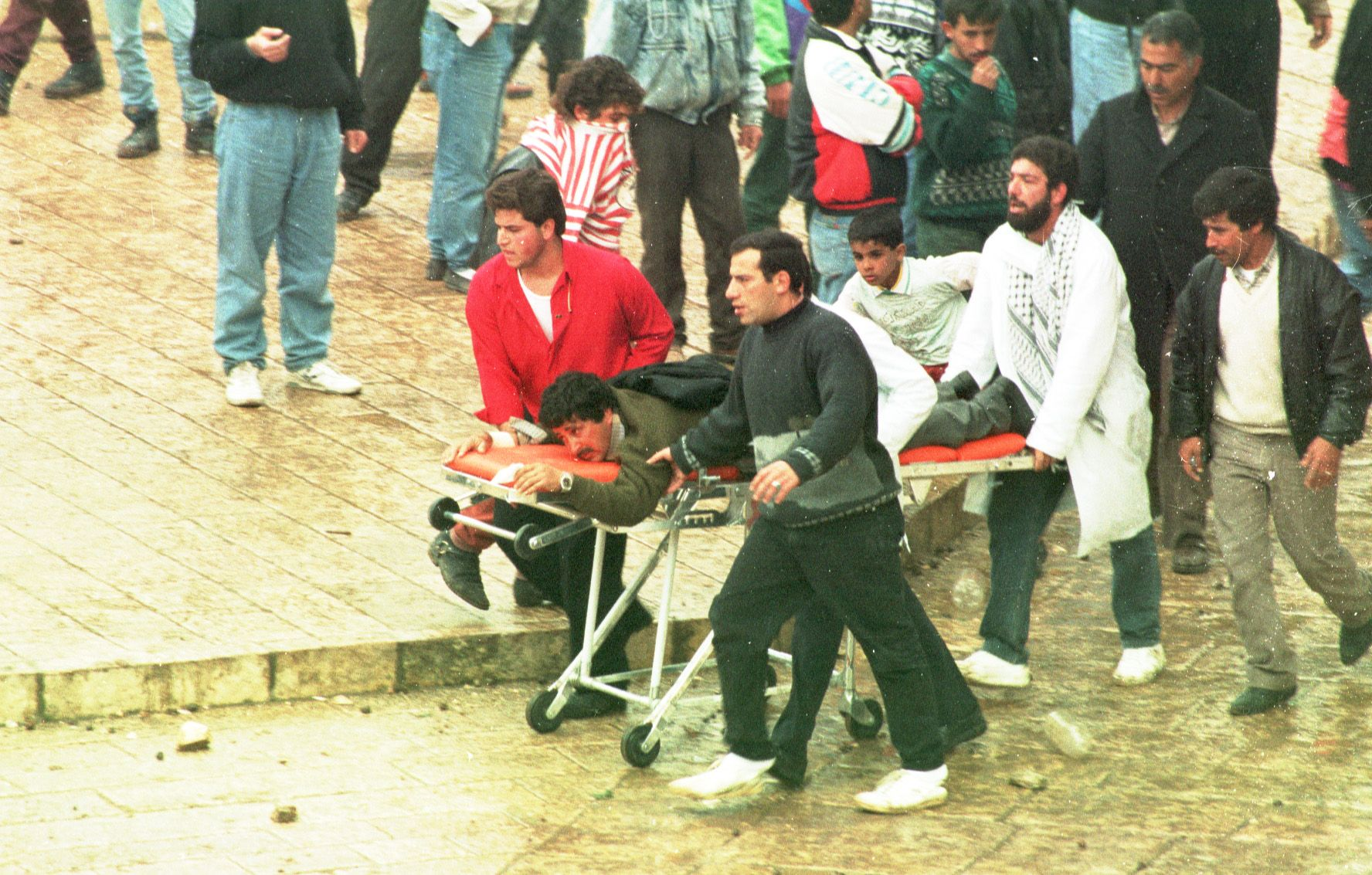
Civilian injured in the riots on the Temple Mount days after the massacre

On February 25, 1994, that year's Purim day, Goldstein entered a room in the Cave of the Patriarchs that was serving as a mosque, wearing the official Israeli Ground Forces uniform "with the insignia of rank, creating the image of a reserve officer on active duty". He then opened fire, killing 29 worshippers and wounding more than 125. Mosque guard Mohammad Suleiman Abu Saleh said he thought that Goldstein was trying to kill as many people as possible, and described how there were "bodies and blood everywhere". Eventually, Goldstein was overcome and beaten to death by survivors of the massacre. According to Ian Lustick, "By mowing down Arabs he believed wanted to kill Jews, Goldstein was re-enacting part of the Purim story."

Palestinian protests and riots immediately followed the shooting; in the following week, twenty-five Palestinians were killed (by the Israel Defense Forces), as well as five Israelis. Following the riots, the Israeli government imposed a two-week curfew on the 120,000 Palestinian residents of Hebron. The 400 Jewish settlers of H2 were free to move around. Israeli Prime Minister Yitzhak Rabin telephoned Palestine Liberation Organization (PLO) leader Yasser Arafat, and described the attack as a "loathsome, criminal act of murder". In an address to the Knesset, Rabin, addressing not just Goldstein and his legacy but also other militant settlers, stated:

You are not part of the community of Israel ... You are not part of the national democratic camp which we all belong to in this house, and many of the people despise you. You are not partners in the Zionist enterprise. You are a foreign implant. You are an errant weed. Sensible Judaism spits you out. You placed yourself outside the wall of Jewish law ... We say to this horrible man and those like him: you are a shame on Zionism and an embarrassment to Judaism.

The Israeli government condemned the massacre, and responded by arresting followers of Meir Kahane, forbidding certain settlers from entering Arab towns, and demanding that those settlers turn in their army-issued rifles, though rejecting a PLO demand that settlers be disarmed and that an international force be created to protect Palestinians. Goldstein was immediately "denounced with shocked horror even by the mainstream Orthodox", and many in Israel classified Goldstein as insane.

== Gravesite and shrine ==
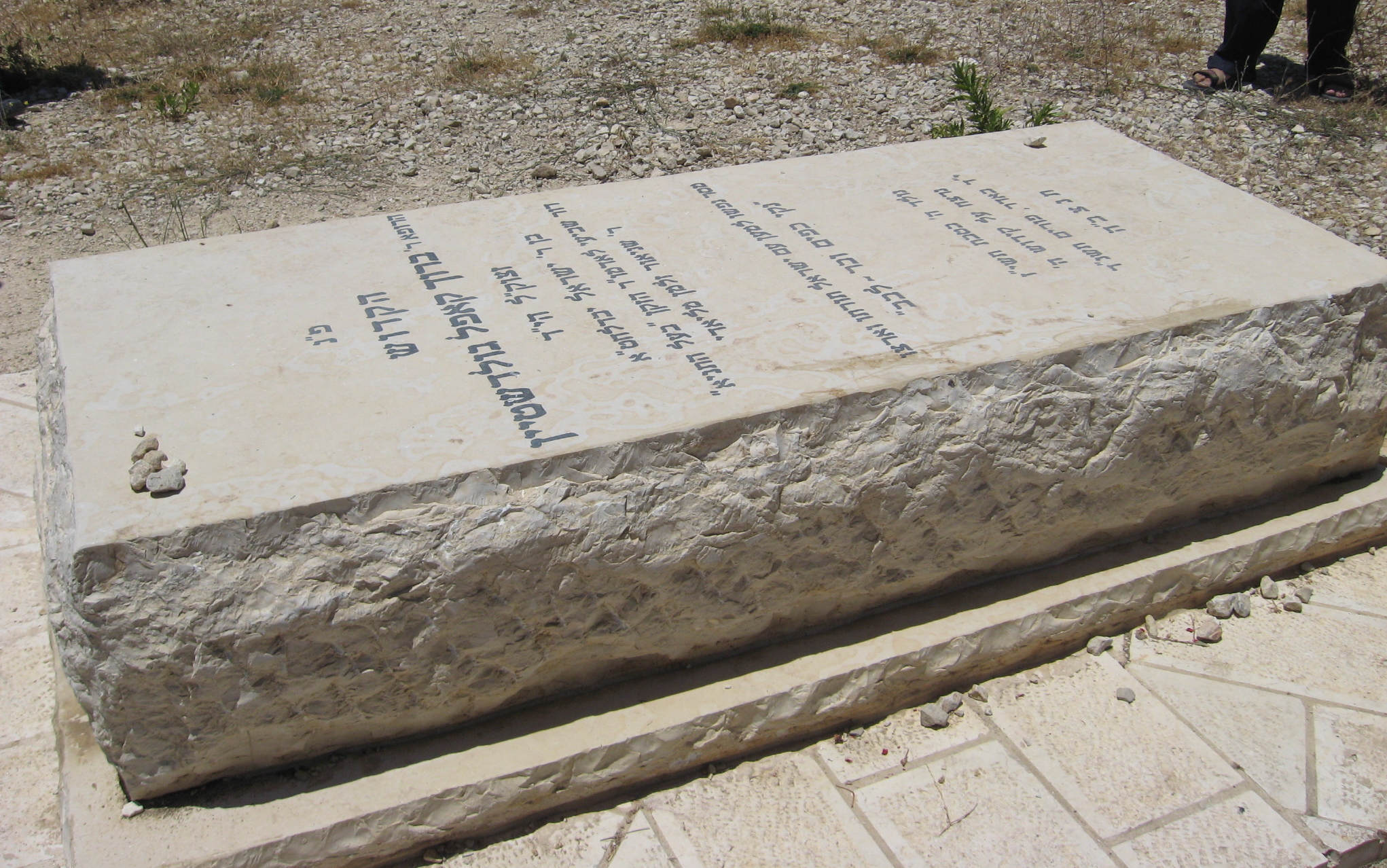
Goldstein's tomb

Israeli military authorities refused to allow Goldstein to be buried in the Jewish cemetery in Hebron. He was buried opposite the Meir Kahane Memorial Park in Kiryat Arba, a Jewish settlement adjacent to Hebron. The park is named in memory of Rabbi Meir Kahane, founder of the Israeli far-right political party Kach, a group classified by the United States and Israeli governments as a terrorist group. Goldstein was a long-time devotee of Kahane.

The gravesite has become a pilgrimage site for Jewish extremists; a plaque near the grave reads, "To the holy Baruch Goldstein, who gave his life for the Jewish people, the Torah, and the nation of Israel". According to Baruch Marzel, about 10,000 people had visited the grave by 2000. In 1996, members of the Labor Party called for the shrine-like landscaped prayer area near the grave to be removed, and Israeli security officials expressed concern that the grave would encourage extremists. In 1999, following passage of a law designed to prohibit monuments to terrorists, and an associated Supreme Court ruling, the Israeli Army bulldozed the shrine and prayer area set up near Goldstein's grave. As of 2014, a new tomb has been built, and still receives visits from Jewish pilgrims.

== Veneration by extremists ==
While mainstream Jewish religious leaders, including the chief rabbis of Israel, rejected the suggestion that killing Palestinians was authorized by the Torah, some extremist religious Jews have defended Goldstein's actions.

At Goldstein's funeral, Rabbi Yaacov Perrin claimed that even one million Arabs are "not worth a Jewish fingernail". Samuel Hacohen, a teacher at a Jerusalem college, declared Goldstein the "greatest Jew alive, not in one way, but in every way", and said that he was "the only one who could do it, the only one who was 100 percent perfect". Rabbi Dov Lior of Kiryat Arba declared that Goldstein was "holier than all the martyrs of the Holocaust".

In the weeks following the massacre, hundreds of Israelis traveled to Goldstein's grave to celebrate his actions. Some Hasidim danced and sang around his grave. According to one visitor to the gravesite in the wake of the attacks, "If [Goldstein] stopped these so-called peace talks, then he is truly holy because this is not real peace." Some visitors declared Goldstein a "saint" and "hero of Israel".

The phenomenon of the veneration of Goldstein's tomb persisted for years. Even after the dismantling of Goldstein's shrine in 1999, radical Jewish settlers continued to celebrate the anniversary of the massacre in the West Bank, sometimes even dressing up themselves or their children to look like Goldstein.

In 2010, Jewish settlers sang songs in praise of Baruch Goldstein's massacre demonstratively in front of their Arab neighbours, during celebrations of Purim. A phrase from one song reads, "Dr. Goldstein, there is none other like you in the world. Dr. Goldstein, we all love you ... He aimed at terrorists' heads, squeezed the trigger hard, and shot bullets, and shot, and shot."

Prior to entering the Knesset, Otzma Yehudit party leader and current Israeli Minister for National Security Itamar Ben-Gvir displayed a portrait of Goldstein in his living room. It was removed when Ben-Gvir entered politics.

== See also ==
- Israeli–Palestinian conflict
- Jewish fundamentalism
- Kahanism
- Terrorism in Israel
- Zionist political violence
- List of rampage killers (religious, political, or ethnic crimes)
