= Aftermath of the September 11 attacks =

Effects and subsequent events of the September 11 attacks

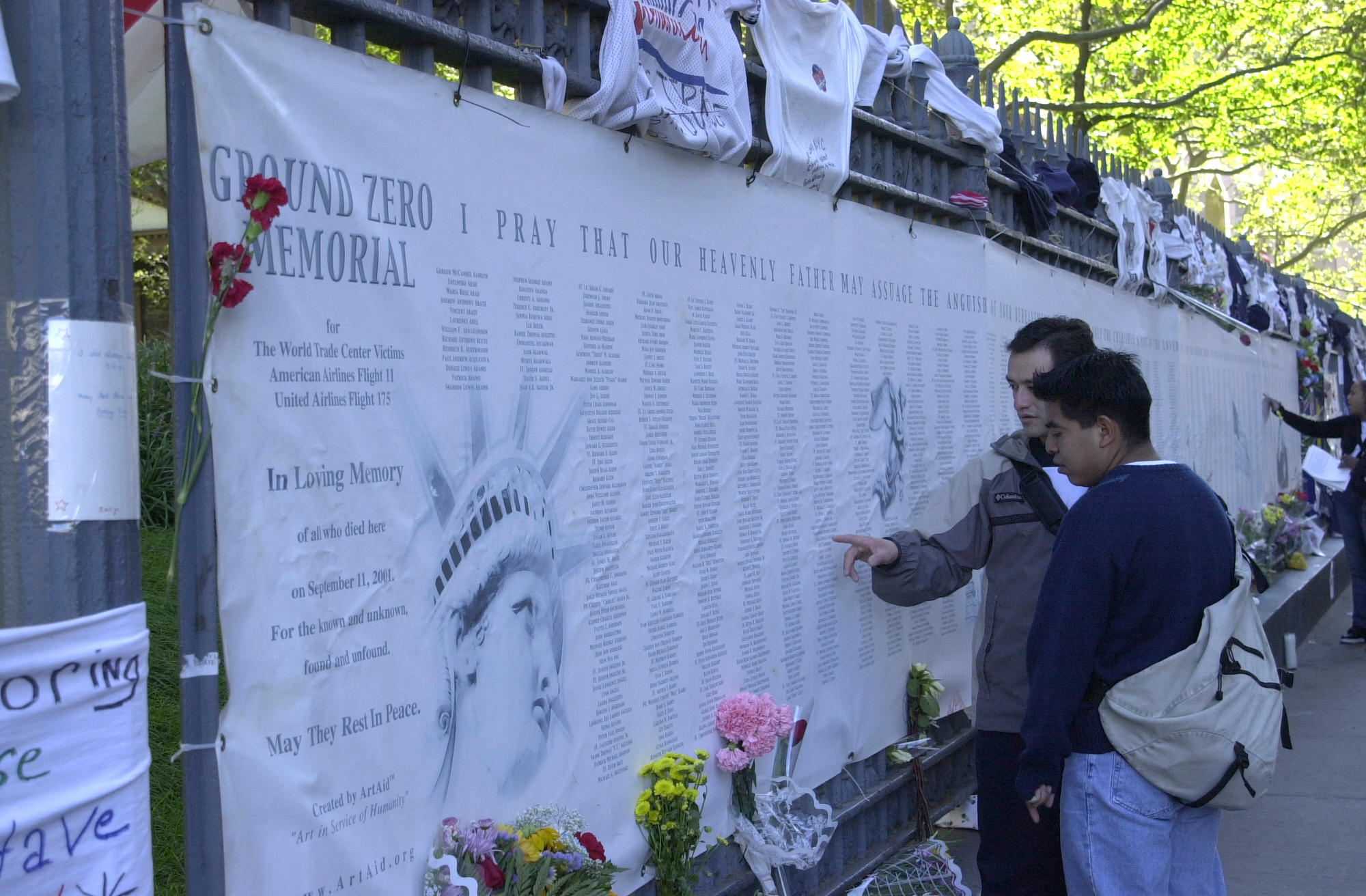
People stop to read from the list of the victims of the World Trade Center in New York City during the one-year anniversary of the attacks in September 2002.

The September 11 attacks have had profound and wide-ranging political, economic, health and societal effects. They also reshaped global security policies and international relations, prompting lasting changes in how nations address terrorism and collective safety. It gave rise to the Global War on Terrorism, which included occupations of Afghanistan (2001–21) and Iraq (2003–11) and various other US-led interventions in the region.

The attacks elicited major rescue and recovery efforts in the affected areas, in particular at the World Trade Center site, which was rebuilt to include a memorial to the victims. Many of the hundreds of workers assisting in these efforts, as well as survivors and people living and working near the site, became seriously ill in the following years and decades due to exposure to toxins, which had spread throughout New York City as a result of the Twin Towers’ collapse. Mental health problems, especially post-traumatic stress disorder (PTSD) among ordinary citizens and first responders also increased as a result of the attacks.

Nationalism, solidarity and widespread support for first responders and the military pervaded the United States throughout the immediate aftermath of the attacks. Islamophobia, anti-Arab racism, and hate crimes and other discriminatory actions surged against members of ethnic and religious minorities in the US and other Western countries. The attacks cost billions of US dollars in damage and insurance claims, caused thousands of office workers to be displaced or lose their jobs, and dealt damage to the global economy. Cultural effects include millions of dollars worth in artwork being lost at the World Trade Center and the Pentagon, and media being adapted to remove any possible similarities to the attacks or references to the Twin Towers in the immediate aftermath.

Having occurred early in the twenty-first century, 9/11 is considered to be a turning point in the history of the US, which was in a relatively unchallenged position in global politics since the end of the Cold War a decade earlier. George W. Bush, who became US president in January 2001, dedicated much of his presidency to retaliation against the attacks and vast counterterrorism measures, in a series of interventions he dubbed the "war on terror". The US government established the United States Department of Homeland Security and increased military operations, surveillance, economic measures, and political pressure on groups that it accused of being terrorists, as well as increasing pressure on governments and countries it accused of sheltering them. October 2001 saw the first military action initiated by the US. Under this policy, NATO invaded Afghanistan to remove the Taliban regime (which harbored al-Qaeda) and capture al-Qaeda forces, invoking its Article 5 for the first time in its history. The US government also asserted that the Iraqi government was connected to 9/11. These efforts were started with near-universal support from Americans, but have since become the topic of strenuous debate. Critics point out that the Afghan conflict has contributed to the destabilization of neighboring Pakistan and Afghanistan has undergone a long war, culminating in the return of the Taliban in 2021.

== Immediate ==
=== Rescue and recovery/Post-9/11 ===
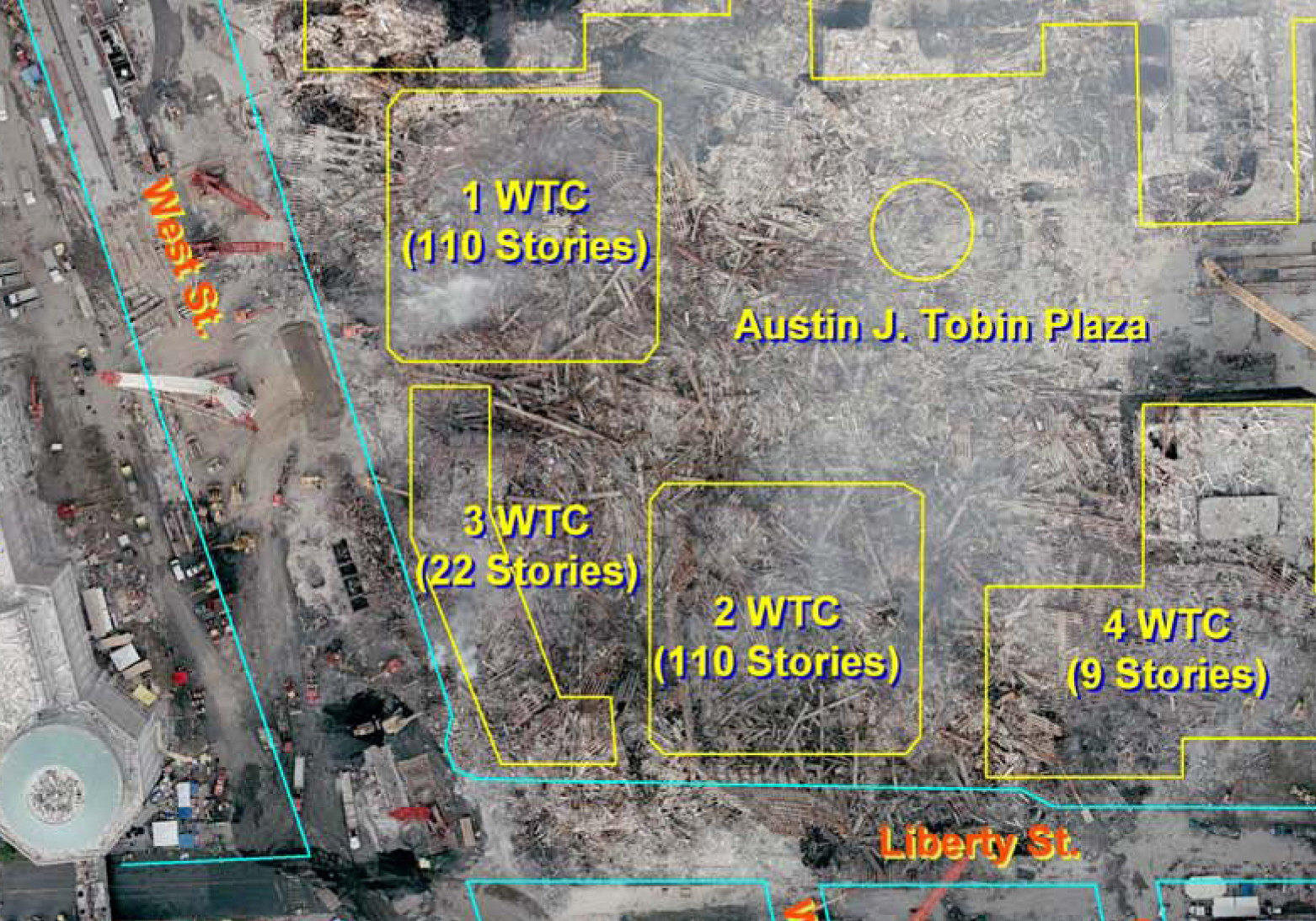
Satellite image of the World Trade Center site after the attacks with the location of the Twin Towers and others in the complex superimposed over the debris field

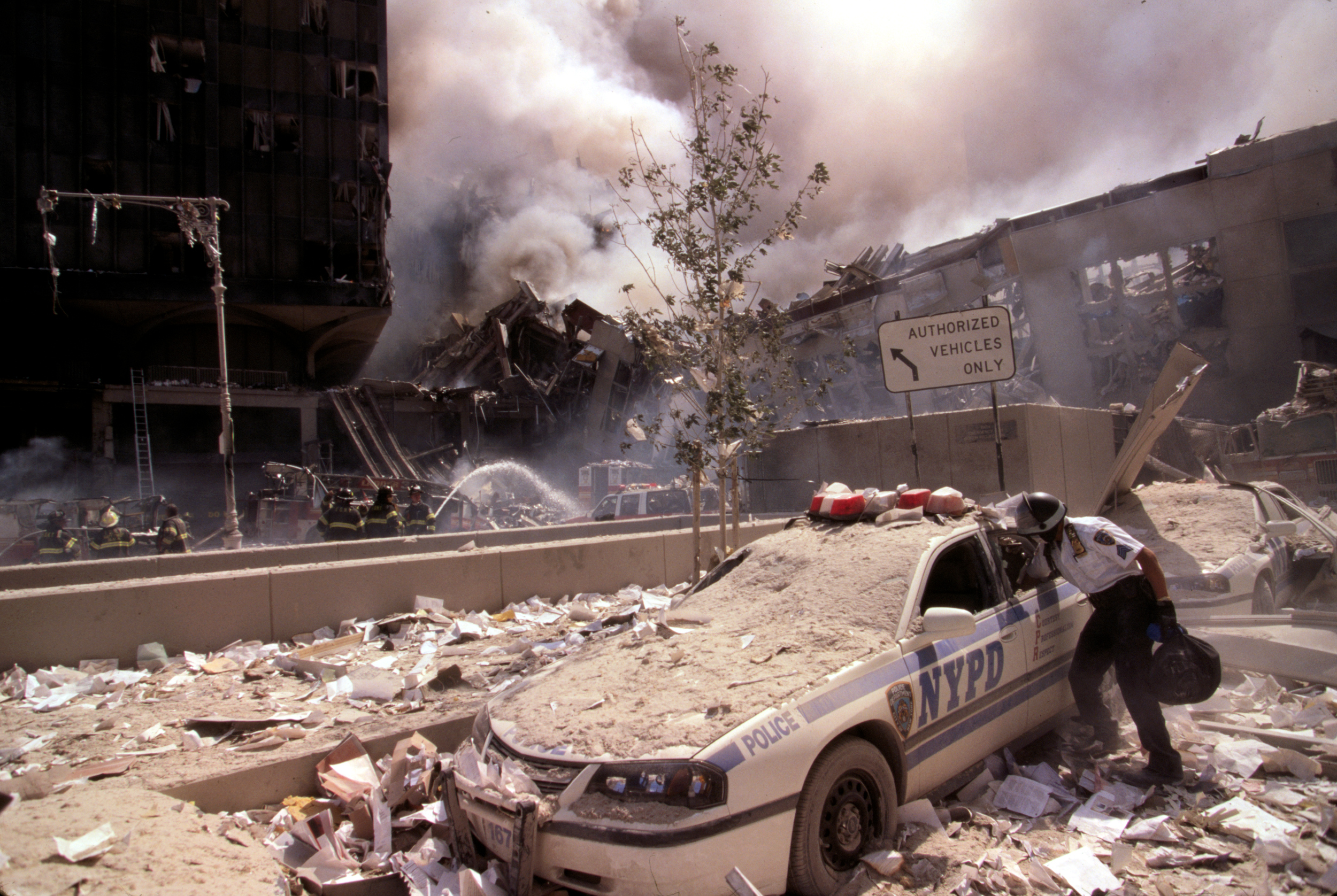
New York fire department personnel examining a smashed New York City police car, during 9/11

Because of the events that took place on September 11, 2001, American society as a whole suffered dramatically. Recovery took years, and the economy declined drastically after the attacks. More than 1,500 first responders, ironworkers, engineers, heavy equipment operators, and other workers worked at Ground Zero to attempt to find survivors and clean up the wreckage. Cranes and bulldozers were brought in along with search and rescue dogs to locate survivors and bodies of the deceased, however, operations were hindered by the presence of approximately two feet of soot at the site, which obscured objects and bodies.

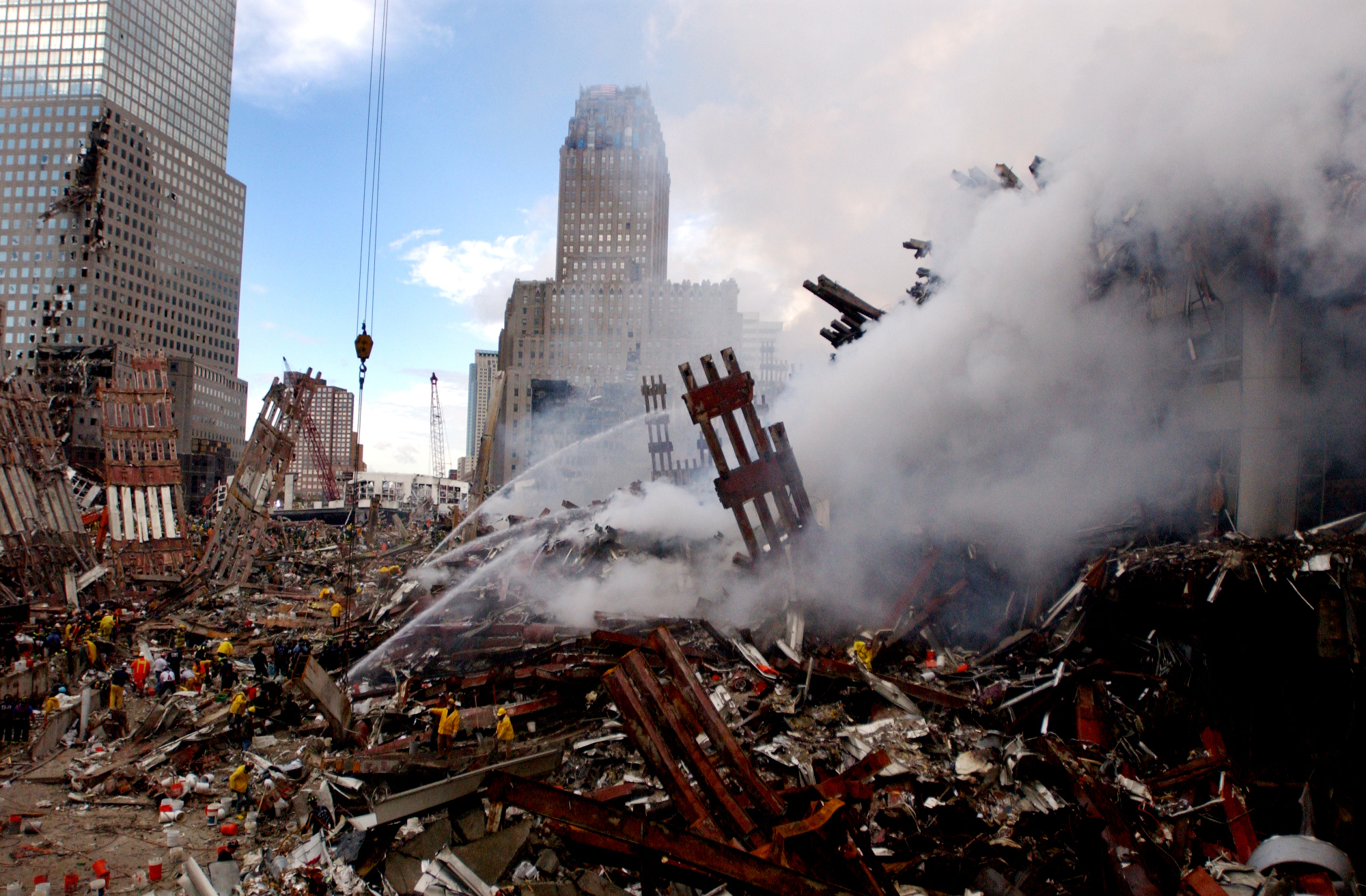
Fires burned amidst the rubble of the World Trade Center for weeks after the attack.

In the immediate aftermath of the attacks, only 20 survivors were pulled alive from the rubble, although there were several human remains and belongings that were removed from the site. The day after the attack, then-mayor Rudy Giuliani told reporters that they were receiving mobile phone calls from people trapped in the debris. The task of removing debris and rubble continued well into 2002, with some 108,000 truckloads of 1.8 million tons of rubble removed by May 2002.

==== Hazards ====
Outside of the general hazards due to fires, falling debris, heavy machinery, broken metal, and hazardous air conditions, there were also hidden concerns within the clean-up zone. The parking garage under the World Trade Center at the time of the attacks held nearly 2,000 automobiles; each held an estimated 5 gallons of gasoline, which could ignite and explode. Other concerns were around buried fuel tanks that were located on the site, and the 1.2 million rounds of ammunition that were housed at Building 6 for the use of the U.S. Customs Service.

=== US public reaction ===
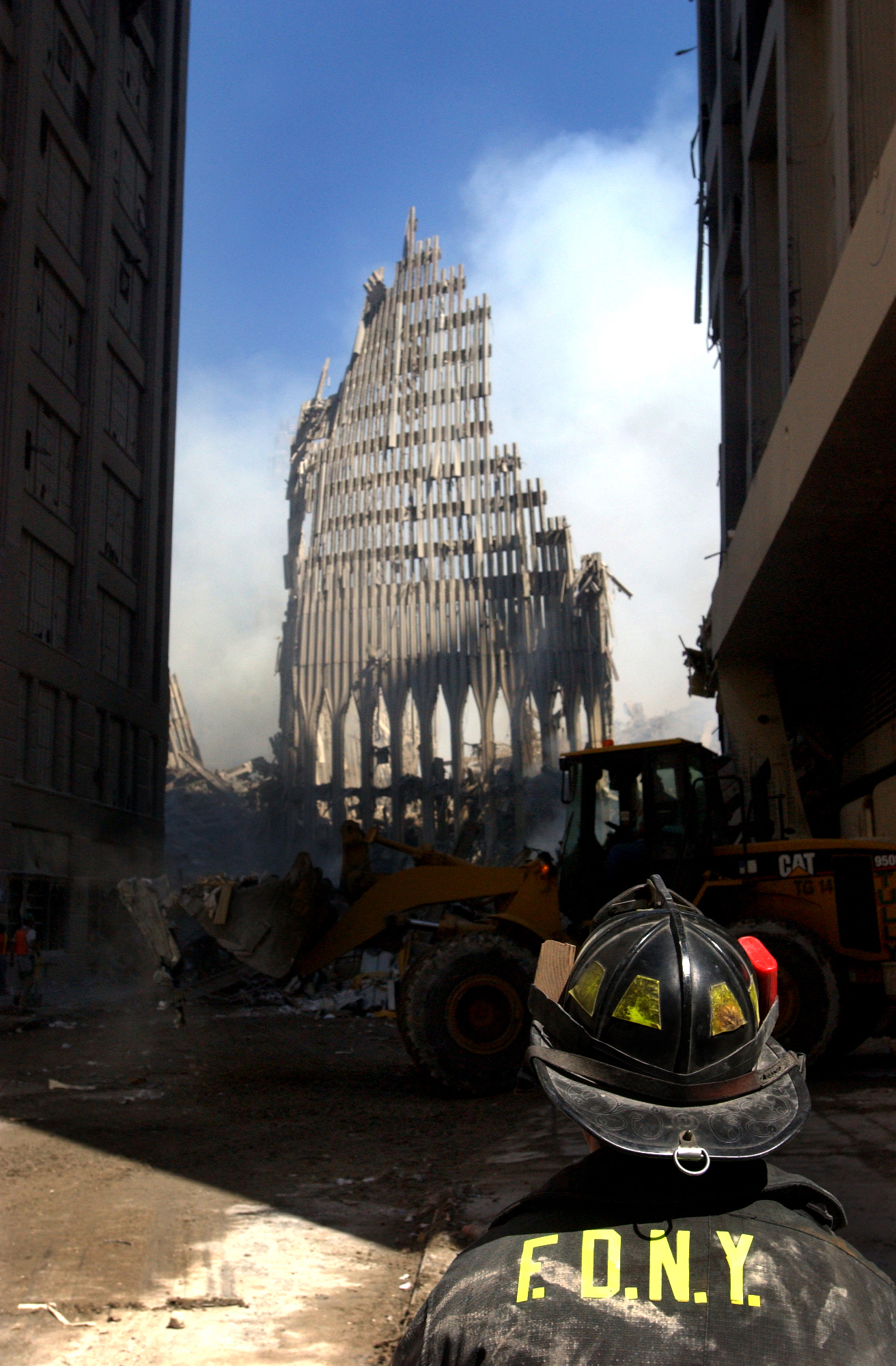
A New York City firefighter looks up at what remains of the South Tower, September 13, 2001.

George W. Bush's Address to the Nation following the events of 9/11

Americans reacted to the terrorist attacks with a mix of shock, sadness, anger and fear. Following the September 11, 2001 attacks, George W. Bush's job approval rating soared to 86%. On September 20, 2001, the president spoke before the nation and a joint-session of Congress, regarding the events of that day, the intervening nine days of rescue and recovery efforts, and his intent in response to those events in going after the terrorists who orchestrated the attacks. In the speech, he characterized the speech itself as being akin to the President's customary State of the Union address. The attacks also had immediate and overwhelming effects upon the United States population. People began rallying around the popularized phrase, "United We Stand," in hopes of being resilient and keeping the American spirit alive in the face of a devastating attack. The majority of the US population rallied behind President Bush and the federal government in widespread support to the recovery and the expectant reaction to the attacks. The highly visible role played by Rudy Giuliani, the Mayor of New York City, won him high praise nationally and in New York City. He was named Person of the Year by TIME magazine for 2001, and at times had a higher profile in the US than President Bush.

Two major public reactions to the attacks were a surge of public expressions of patriotism not seen since World War II, marked most often by displays of the American flag; and an unprecedented level of respect, sympathy, and admiration for New York City and New Yorkers as a group by Americans in other parts of the United States. Some criticized this particular reaction, noting that not everyone who died was from New York City (for example, some of the passengers on the planes) and that the Arlington County, Virginia community also suffered in the attacks. Many people joined together to help the victims. Gratitude toward uniformed public-safety workers, and especially toward firefighters, was widely expressed in light of both the drama of the risks taken on the scene and the high death toll among the workers. Many people paid tribute to the police officers and firefighters who died during the attacks by wearing NYPD and FDNY hats. The number of casualties among the emergency service personnel was unprecedented.

Blood donations saw a surge in the weeks after 9/11. According to a report by the Journal of the American Medical Association, "...the number of blood donations in the weeks after September 11, 2001, attacks was markedly greater than in the corresponding weeks of 2000 (2.5 times greater in the first week after the attacks; 1.3–1.4 times greater in the second to fourth weeks after the attack)." At the Westminster Kennel Club Dog Show that took place in New York in February 2002, a tribute was paid to the search and rescue dogs who not only assisted in locating survivors and bodies from the rubble but were also inside the World Trade Center buildings before they collapsed.

==== Backlash and hate crimes ====
In weeks following the attacks, there was a surge in incidents of harassment and hate crimes against South Asians, Middle Easterners, and anyone thought to be "Middle Eastern-looking"—particularly Sikhs, because Sikh males usually wear turbans, which are stereotypically and erroneously associated with Muslims by many Americans. Balbir Singh Sodhi, a Sikh man, was one of the first victims of this backlash; he was shot dead on September 15 at the gas station he owned in Mesa, Arizona. Mark Anthony Stroman, a white supremacist, killed two men and injured a third in a shooting spree beginning September 15 in Dallas, Texas. His victims, including Bangladeshi American Rais Bhuiyan, were all targeted because they looked "of Muslim descent". His motive for the killings was revenge for the 9/11 attacks. In New York City itself, the only death possibly related to post-9/11 hate violence officially recorded as a homicide was Henryk Siwiak, a Polish immigrant shot in Bedford-Stuyvesant, Brooklyn on September 11. His family theorized he may have been the victim of a hate crime in the wake of the attacks, since he was wearing camouflage clothing, had dark hair and spoke imperfect, heavily accented English. The case remains unsolved; police are open to the family's theory but have not classified the killing as a bias crime.

In many cities there were reports of vandalism against mosques and other Islamic institutions, including some cases of arson. In the year after the attack, anti-Muslim hate crimes jumped 1,600 percent. The FBI and other government agencies arrested and deported Arabs and Arab Americans in higher numbers after the attacks than before, often with limited or insufficient evidence to connect them to purported terrorism.

As memorials were set up all over NY and even in the 9/11 museum, Talat Hamdani's request to honor her son, Salman Hamdani, was denied. Salman Hamdani was an off-duty EMT and an NYPD cadet who died as he went to the towers to help save others. Salman Hamdani was Pakistani-American and his mother, Talat Hamdani, received public assaults of his character as they believed because of their Muslim faith, he must have been involved with the attacks as he was missing. Talat was questioned and asked about the reasons Salman joined the NYPD, his travel experience and who he was in contact with. News outlets like the New York Post published a story, "Missing or Hiding? — Mystery of NYPD Cadet from Pakistan", and multiple "Wanted" posters that had pictures from his cadet days stating "Hold and detain. Notify: major squad case". His body was found a month after the event and he was post-humously declared a hero by Congress 45 days after the attack, although his name was originally placed under the list of non-first responders.

In the hopes of dissuading Islamophobic violence, President Bush delivered remarks at the Islamic Center of Washington on September 17 in which he distinguished between al-Qaeda and Islam writ large, affirming that "Islam is peace"; he also criticized Americans who would "take out their anger" about 9/11 against Muslim individuals, calling them "the worst of humankind". Compared to the days immediately preceding Bush's speech, there were fewer hate crimes against Muslims in the United States in the days after it. The Pew Research Center reported that in November 2001, 59% of Americans, relatively evenly distributed among both Republicans and Democrats, reported viewing Islam favorably, an increase in positive disposition compared to 45% that March. This shared outlook did not last, however, and over subsequent years, views of Islam diverged along partisan lines as Republicans increasingly associated Islam with violence.

== Long-term effects ==
=== Government restructuring ===
US President George W. Bush established the Office of Homeland Security by executive order on October 8, 2001. Congress enacted the Homeland Security Act of 2002, restructured the federal government of the US and creating the United States Department of Homeland Security. It was the largest restructuring of the federal government since the Department of Defense was created via the National Security Act of 1947 (as amended in 1949).

=== Islamophobia ===
There was a global rise in Islamophobia in the aftermath of the September 11 attacks. The Equal Employment Opportunity Commission or EEOC in the US reported that religion-based discrimination against Muslims had increased by nearly 250%.

=== Effects on children ===
The attacks were regarded by some as particularly disturbing to children, in part because of the frequency with which the images were replayed on television. Many schools closed early, especially those with children whose parents worked in Washington, D.C., and New York City. In Sarasota, Florida, Emma E. Booker Elementary School became a part of history, as President George W. Bush was reading to a classroom of children there when the attacks happened.

Psychological studies focused on children exposed to the attacks in Lower Manhattan and New York City found higher rates of clinically significant behavior problems among preschool children, as well as elevated rates of PTSD and depression in the years after the attacks. For children who lost a parent in the attack, psychologists noticed that while some coped well initially, they would at times succumb to bouts of depression and self-harm later in life, or become reluctant to discuss their family history.

=== Health effects ===
The thousands of tons of toxic debris resulting from the collapse of the Twin Towers contained more than 2,500 contaminants, including known carcinogens. Subsequent debilitating illnesses among rescue and recovery workers are said to be linked to exposure to these carcinogens. The Bush administration ordered the Environmental Protection Agency (EPA) to issue reassuring statements regarding air quality in the aftermath of the attacks, citing national security; however, the EPA did not determine that air quality had returned to pre-9/11 levels until June 2002.

Health effects also extended to residents, students, and office workers of Lower Manhattan and nearby Chinatown. Several deaths have been linked to the toxic dust, and the victims' names were included in the World Trade Center memorial. As of January 1, 2002, the New York Police Department had received 37 disability claims, and the Fire Department reported 269 disability claims related to injuries suffered as a result of the attacks. Approximately 18,000 people have been estimated to have developed illnesses as a result of the toxic dust. By 2004, nearly half of more than 1,000 screened rescue-and-recovery workers and volunteers reported new and persistent respiratory problems, and more than half reported persistent psychological symptoms. Because of the long latency period between exposure and development of asbestos-related diseases, exposed Manhattan residents, especially rescue-and-recovery workers, can suffer future adverse health effects. One such death related to health effects was the January 6, 2006, death of NYPD James Zadroga which was ruled by a New Jersey coroner as directly due to clean-up at the WTC site. This ruling was unequivocally rejected in October 2007 by the New York City Chief Medical Examiner, Dr. Charles Hirsch, and Medical Examiner Michele Slone. On June 29, 2019, former New York Police Department detective Luis G. Alvarez died from colorectal cancer, with which he was diagnosed in 2016 and is believed to be caused from his three months spent at Ground Zero after 9/11.

There is also scientific speculation that exposure to various toxic products in the air may have negative effects on fetal development. The Columbia Center for Children’s Environmental Health launched its World Trade Center Pregnancy Study in December 2001. It found that women who lived or worked near the WTC and were in their first trimester of pregnancy when the towers collapsed gave birth to babies that were smaller than average. A study of rescue workers released in April 2010 found that all those studied had impaired lung functions, and that 30–40% were reporting little or no improvement in persistent symptoms that started within the first year of the attack.

==== Legal ====
Years after the attacks, legal disputes over the costs of illnesses related to the attacks were still in the court system. On October 17, 2006, a federal judge rejected New York City's refusal to pay for health costs for rescue workers, allowing for the possibility of numerous suits against the city. Government officials have been faulted for urging the public to return to lower Manhattan in the weeks shortly after the attacks. Christine Todd Whitman, administrator of the EPA in the aftermath of the attacks, was heavily criticized by a U.S. District Judge for incorrectly saying that the area was environmentally safe. Mayor Giuliani was criticized for urging financial industry personnel to return quickly to the greater Wall Street area.

=== Economic ===
After the terrorist attack, various repercussions took place that affected the U.S as a whole. All the money and claims that were being put out to help aid the victims of the attack, as well as different security and laws to protect the U.S., caused several layoffs and unemployment. Specifically, it was said that 462 extended mass layoffs were because of the attacks that displaced approximately 130,000 employees. The unemployment rate inclined to a total of 5.0%.

The attacks caused an estimated overall economic loss to the city of $82.8 to 94.8 billion, with the lower number being consistent with the NYC Partnership's November 2001 estimate and the high end being consistent with the New York City Comptroller's October 2001 estimate. It was calculated that the lost human productive value, life insurance payouts were $2.63 billion, federal payments after offsets were estimated at $2.34 billion and charitable payments were $0.79 billion.

==== Censorship ====
After 9/11, Clear Channel Communications (an owner of over 1,000 radio stations in the U.S.) released a list of songs deemed "inappropriate". The songs were not banned, but stations were advised not to play them.

Films and television programs produced before 2001 that feature the Twin Towers of the World Trade Center or events similar to 9/11 have been edited in re-airings on television such as the episode of The Simpsons, "The City of New York vs. Homer Simpson," where the main setting is the World Trade Center.

The New York-based band Dream Theater released a live album titled Live Scenes from New York on September 11, 2001. The cover art depicted the Manhattan skyline, including the World Trade Center towers in flames. It was immediately recalled, and the artwork was altered.

British band Bush changed the name of their single 'Speed Kills' to "The People That We Love". They also changed the original artwork for their album Golden State before it was released which originally depicted a picture of a plane in mid-air.

The music video for a song called 'Piece By Piece' by British band Feeder was also changed. The original video depicted animated characters of the band playing in a New York skyscraper with the World Trade Center in the background and planes flying nearby. The band later jumped from the window of the building.

==== Lost artwork ====
It was projected by one individual that public art that was damaged or destroyed during the attacks was valued at $10 million. Art by Louise Nevelson, Alexander Calder, and James Rosati were all destroyed along with a memorial sculpture by Elyn Zimmerman in memorial for the victims of the 1993 World Trade Center Bombing.

==== Insurance claims ====
As of August 2002, there were approximately 1,464 claims against the city of New York City that amounted to approximately $8.2 billion, although the New York City Law Department indicated at the time that the City's liability for the claims would only be around $350 million, provided through an act of Congress. The claims ranged from City employee's personal injuries that totaled around $5.2 billion, suffering due to the loss of life that totaled around $3 billion, and for the destruction of property such as the one filed by AEGIS Insurance Company for $250 million.

==== Grants and funds ====
Following the road to recovery, the federal government and state began issuing grants and various funds to compensate and help those who suffered. The 9/11 Heroes Stamp Program was administered by the Department of Homeland Security which gave funds to those who became disabled from direct contact in the attack or suffered a loss from the attack. The Post- 9/11 GI Bill became a result after 9/11, paying homage to the U.S military soldiers, which provided educational and financial assistance to those soldiers who were returning to civilian life. Federal grant aid assisted states, communities, and local organizations in their efforts to stay safe and remain readily prepared. For that to happen, the program's law enforcement training and technical assistance grant was created hoping to stop or better compose for a terrorist attack.

The September 11th Victim Compensation Fund (VCF) was established to provide financial assistance to those that experienced the disaster directly or those who lost family members from the attack. The fund has provided reimbursements for medical treatments for various conditions affecting victims, including PTSD and health effects from being exposed to toxic air.

==== Trade relations ====
The attacks affected trade relations with foreign countries, complicating the supply of oil demands. After the attack, oil prices skyrocketed.

=== New infrastructure ===
World Trade Center site layout

Above: The World Trade Center site prior to the September 11 attacks

Above: Preliminary site plans for the World Trade Center rebuild

Comparison (background: pre-9/11, blue overlay: planned rebuild)

Rebuilding of the area began shortly after cleanup, and construction began on the Freedom Tower and the National September 11 Memorial and Museum.

==== Park51 ====
Park51 (originally named Cordoba House) is a planned 13-story Muslim community center to be located two blocks from the World Trade Center site in Lower Manhattan. The majority of the center will be open to the general public and its proponents have said the center will promote interfaith dialogue. It will contain a Muslim prayer space that has controversially been referred to as the "Ground Zero mosque", though numerous commentators noted that it was neither a mosque nor at Ground Zero.

It would replace an existing 1850s Italianate-style building that was being used as a Burlington Coat Factory before it was damaged in the September 11 attacks. The proposed multi-faith aspects of the design include a 500-seat auditorium, theater, a performing arts center, a fitness center, a swimming pool, a basketball court, a child care area, a bookstore, a culinary school, an art studio, a food court, and a memorial to the victims of the September 11 attacks. The prayer space for the Muslim community would accommodate 1,000–2,000 people.

== Immigration ==
The Department of Homeland Security, created after the attack, brought "the intensity, scope, and funding of U.S. border and immigration enforcement to heights previously unseen in the nation’s history".

== Security and military actions ==
After the dissolution of the Soviet Union in 1991, the US had begun adapting to smaller-scale, specialized warfare in the absence of a major adversary, yet overlooked the emergence of militant organizations, usually based in and often funded by countries that were considered insignificant global players in the past. The US was not spared by foreign terrorism prior to 9/11, including bombings on US embassies in African countries and the USS Cole, as well as a previous attack on the World Trade Center. The September 11 attacks, which killed over 2,700 people in New York City alone, proved that these smaller organizations were capable of inflicting mass casualties on the US mainland, and inaugurated terrorism as a major security threat to the US. Due to its resemblance to the attack on Pearl Harbor, American commentators saw 9/11 as a declaration of war.

On October 23, 2001, the United States Department of Justice produced a memorandum titled Authority for Use of Military Force to Combat Terrorist Activities Within the United States. It states that the President has both the constitutional and statutory authority to use the military as a means to combat terrorist activity within the United States.

Three days later, on October 26, 2001, Congress passed the Patriot Act, which broadened the powers of law enforcement to identify terrorist activity. For example, law enforcement was allowed to break into one's premises without a search warrant and their consent, if they were suspected of terrorist activity. This also included roving wiretaps as a method of surveillance. For instance, the government was allowed to search through one's record searches and intelligence searches. Specifically, if one searched terrorism activities or showed unusual behavior and then deleted their history, the government was able to see that. The purpose of this act was to catch acts of terrorism before any attacks were planned and executed. A program called Total Information Awareness was developed to enhance technology that would collect and analyze information about every individual in the United States, and trace unusual behaviors that could help prevent terrorist activities. Information that was gathered through the program included internet activity, credit card purchase histories, airline ticket purchases, and medical records.

Due to many Americans gaining a fear of flying, automobile usage increased after the attacks. This resulted in an estimated 1,595 additional highway deaths in the ensuing year. This fear of flying also created the Transportation Security Administration (TSA), which is used to increase safety and reduce fear of flying in citizens.

In November 2001, Congress passed the Aviation and Transportation Security Act which applied to different types of transportation, not just air travel. The evolution of security and protective services changed tremendously due to the attacks. Immediate changes include air travel policies, airport security and screening, and guidelines that must be obeyed before getting on board.

Additional screening was another main focus that took place during the period after the attacks, and many passengers were prescreened and advanced screened at different security checkpoints. This led to the major issue of racial profiling and invasion of privacy, as many Middle Eastern-looking people were singled out for further screening. Luggage screening was another main objective, as new technology was introduced to scan passengers' luggage thoroughly and search for weapons or bombs. In addition, some pilots were required by the Department of Homeland Security to carry a firearm on board. Better known as a Federal Flight Deck Officer, these pilots undergo training to prevent terrorist attacks or other potential dangers on an airplane.

=== Surveillance ===
The 2001 Patriot Act, especially Title II of the act, contained provisions allowing various government agencies to conduct mass surveillance, including wiretapping and collecting other communication information. Critics of the act argued that it violated protected individual and civil rights.

In the years following the attacks, the US government also expanded data analysis initiatives, including the creation of the Information Awareness Office (IAO), within the Defense Advanced Research Projects Agency (DARPA), which oversaw the development of "Total Information Awareness" designed for identifying potential terrorist threats through large-scaled data analysis. The program was criticized by privacy advocates and Congress due to privacy concerns and the project was defunded.

Much of the surveillance initiatives of the US targeted Muslims, such as the "Muslim Surveillance Program" of the New York City Police Department.

=== 9/11-related plots and attacks within the US (2001–2021) ===
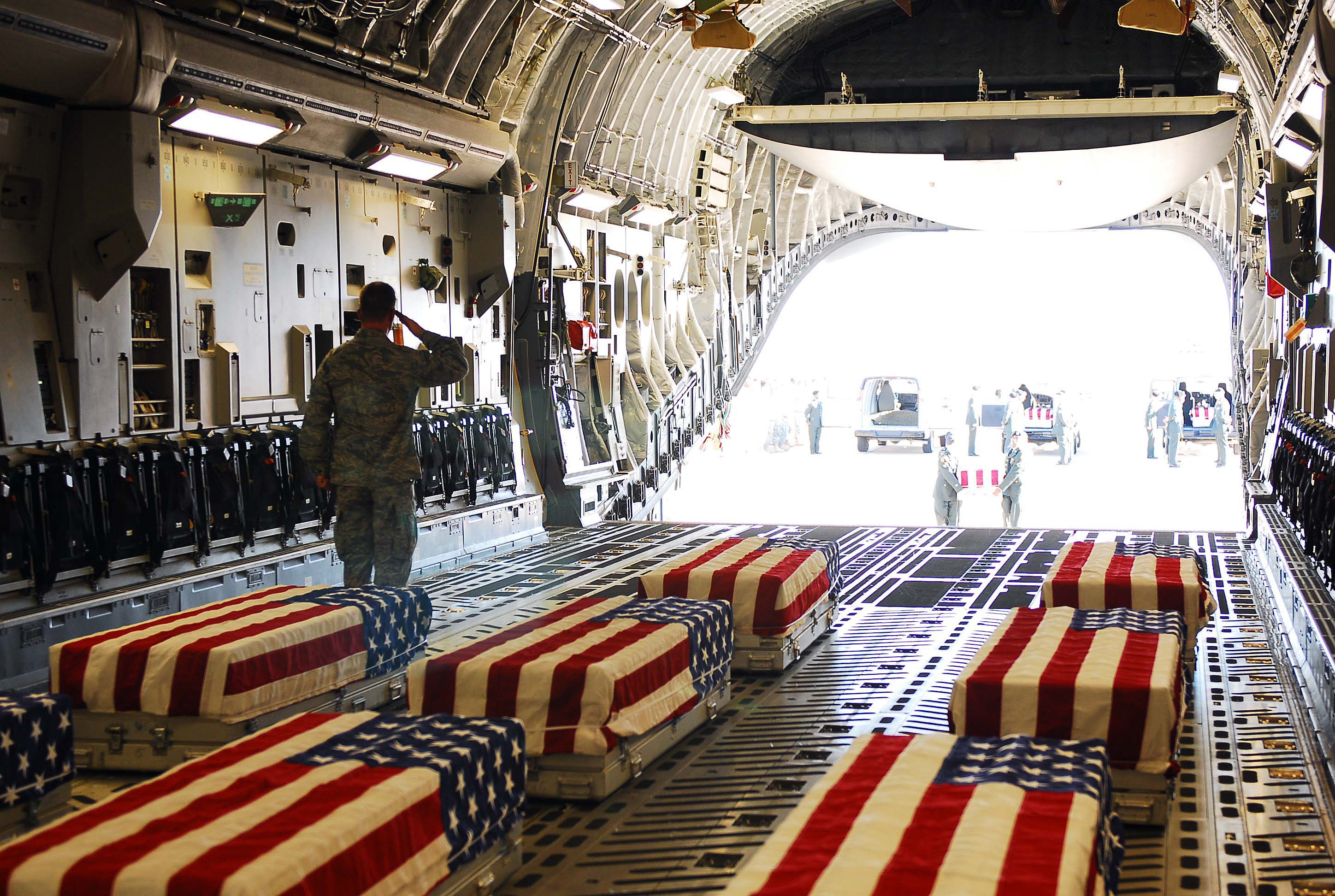
Coffins of soldiers killed in the 2009 Fort Hood shooting being loaded aboard an aircraft for the flight to Dover Air Force Base

==== Thwarted attacks ====
- It was rumored that al-Qaeda planned to target the US Bank Tower (aka Library Tower) in Los Angeles and other buildings elsewhere in the US in an alleged second wave of aircraft hijackings to be carried out in the spring or summer of 2002. However, terrorism researchers and counter-terrorism experts have disputed this.
- 2001 shoe bomb plot in which London-born Richard Reid carried shoes that were packed with two types of explosives onboard a transatlantic American Airlines flight from Paris to Miami.
- 2003 plot by former FBI agent Iyman Faris to blow up the Brooklyn Bridge in New York City
- 2004 Financial buildings plot which targeted the International Monetary Fund and World Bank buildings in Washington, DC, the New York Stock Exchange and other financial institutions was stopped in the early stages. The conspirators were said to have "had no funding, vehicles or bomb-making equipment."
- 2004 Columbus Shopping Mall Bombing Plot
- 2006 transatlantic aircraft plot which was to involve liquid explosives
- 2006 Sears Tower plot
- 2007 Fort Dix attack plot
- 2007 John F. Kennedy International Airport attack plot
- 2009 Northwest Airlines Flight 253 in which a passenger tried to set off plastic explosives sewn to his underwear
- 2010 Times Square car bombing attempt
- 2011 Spokane bombing attempt
- 2015 Curtis Culwell Center attack

==== Successful attacks with at least 10 fatalities ====
- 2009 Fort Hood shooting – 14 people were killed and 33 others were injured, including the perpetrator.
- 2015 San Bernardino attack – 16 people were killed, including both perpetrators, and 24 others were injured.
- 2016 Orlando nightclub shooting – 50 people were killed, including the perpetrator, and 58 others were injured.

Bombings in Kabul, Afghanistan occurred after the attacks and were reposted live by CNN correspondent Nic Robertson less than 24 hours after the attacks in America.

== International ==
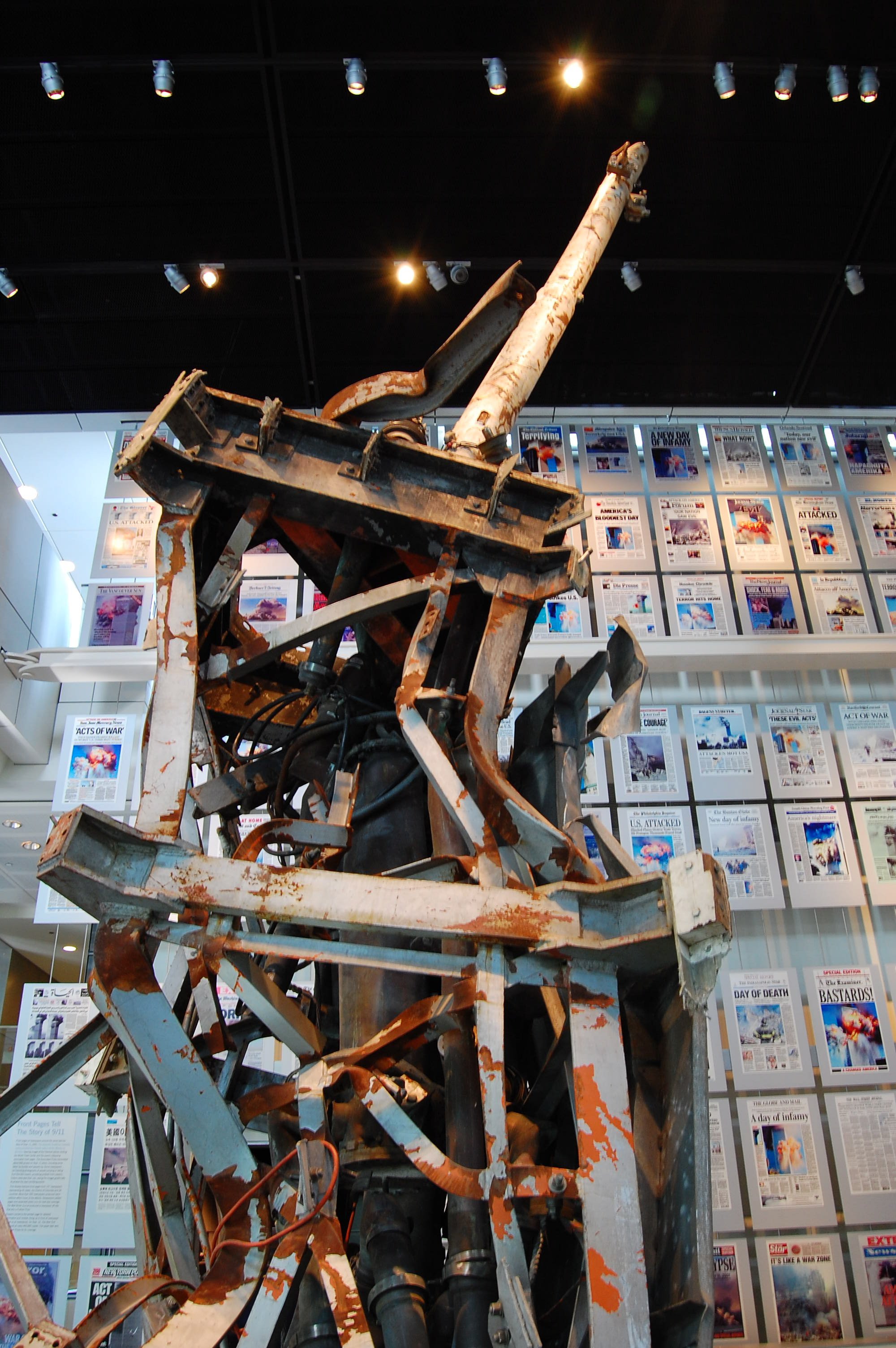
Part of the North Tower's antenna mast displayed at the Newseum in Washington, D.C., behind it a panel of September 12 front pages from around the world

The attacks had major worldwide political effects. Many other countries introduced tough anti-terrorism legislation and took action to cut off terrorist finances, including the freezing of bank accounts suspected of being used to fund terrorism. Law enforcement and intelligence agencies stepped up cooperation to arrest terrorist suspects and break up suspected terrorist cells around the world.

Reaction to the attacks in the Muslim world was mixed. Also, shortly after the attack, the media picked up on several celebrations of the attacks in the Middle East with images of these celebrations being broadcast on television and published in print. Less publicized were public displays of sympathy, including candlelight vigils in countries like Iran.

In the immediate aftermath, support for the United States' right to defend itself was expressed across the world, and by United Nations Security Council Resolution 1368. The Australian Prime Minister, John Howard, was in Washington D.C. at the time of the attacks and invoked the ANZUS military alliance as a pledge of Australian assistance to the U.S.

=== Aid ===
In the immediate aftermath of the attacks, many United States–based airports would not accept airplane flights to land, causing Operation Yellow Ribbon in which all incoming international flights were rerouted by the FAA to airports in Canada. Many Canadians opened up their homes to stranded travelers and organizations such as the Society for the Prevention of Cruelty to Animals gave comfort to animals and other special groups that were stranded by the diversions.

In France, calls to the United States Embassy were placed by locals who offered rooms within their homes to stranded passengers and observed the official day of mourning with three minutes of silence and stillness.

=== Memorials and vigils ===
The attack prompted numerous memorials and services all over the world with many countries, along with the United States, declaring a national day of mourning. In Berlin, 200,000 Germans marched to show their solidarity with America. The French newspaper of record, Le Monde, ran a front-page headline reading "Nous sommes Tous Américains", or "We are all Americans". In London, the US national anthem was played at the Changing of the Guard at Buckingham Palace. In the UK, national anthems are typically only played for official state visits. To mark Queen Elizabeth II's Golden Jubilee, New York City lit the Empire State Building in purple and gold, to say "thank you" for this action.

=== Hate crimes ===
Hate crimes against Muslims increased around the world. For example, Canada experienced a 16-fold increase in anti-Muslim attacks immediately a year after 9/11. In the year leading to the attack, there were only 11 reported crimes but a year following 9/11, there were 173 hate crime cases reported. The same also happened in the United Kingdom and Australia. In the latter's case, a study conducted in Sydney and Melbourne revealed an overwhelming majority of Muslim residents who experienced racism or racist violence since the attack. Another study claimed that hate crimes "increased for all Muslims after 9/11, although the relative risk was much higher for those individuals living in countries with smaller Muslim populations."

An increase in racial tensions was seen in countries such as England, with a number of violent crimes linked to the September 11th attacks. The most severe example was seen in Peterborough, where teenager Ross Parker was murdered by a gang of up to ten Muslims of Pakistani background who had sought a white male to attack.

== See also ==
- 9/11 Commission Report – U.S. government report on the September 11, 2001, terrorist attacks
- 9/11 conspiracy theories – Theories on 2001 terror attacks in U.S.
- Aftermath of the Afghanistan War (2001–2021) – Aftermath of the Afghanistan War
- Class of 9/11 – 2005 US military academy graduating class
- Cultural influence of the September 11 attacks – Impact of 9/11 on society and culture
- Effects of the September 11 attacks on Chinatown, New York City – Effects of 9/11 on Chinatown
- Fahrenheit 9/11 – 2004 documentary film by Michael Moore
- Patriot Day – American day in remembrance of 9/11 victims
- United States government operations and exercises on September 11, 2001 – NORAD operations cancelled in the wake of the 9/11 attacks
