= Christopher Paul =

American terrorist

- Born: Paul Kenyatta Laws; March 1, 1964 (age 62); Columbus, Ohio
- Other names: Abdulmalek Kenyatta; Abdul Malek; Alex Karagezyan
- Education: Thomas Worthington High School
- Alma mater: Columbus State Community College
- Occupation: al-Qaeda terrorist

Christopher Paul (aka Paul Kenyatta Laws, Abdulmalek Kenyatta) is an American al-Qaeda militant, who has pleaded guilty to acts of terrorism.

== Early life ==
Born Paul Kenyatta Laws, he changed his name to Alex Karagezyan in 1989, but then to Christopher Paul in 1994. Additional names have included Abdul Malek. Paul is an American citizen, resident of the Columbus, Ohio, area, where he was born. He grew up in suburban Worthington, Ohio.

He attended Thomas Worthington High School. He then became a student at Columbus State Community College from 1988 to 1990. It was during this period that he converted to Islam, changing his name to Abdulmalek Kenyatta. From 1990 and 1994, he was taking training at an al-Qaeda camp in Afghanistan learning hand-to-hand combat and the use of weapons including rocket-propelled grenades. He also traveled to a number of countries, including Croatia, Austria, and Slovenia, before returning to Columbus in 1994 and changing his name to Christopher Paul. Paul took classes at Columbus State for another 4 years, and was granted an associate degree in 1998. He attended the Omar Ibnelkhattab Mosque at 580 Riverview Dr. in Columbus.

== Terrorist period ==
He received training from al-Qaeda in the early 1990s in Pakistan and Afghanistan.

He fought on behalf of Islamist militant groups in Bosnia and Afghanistan in the early 1990s. In Afghanistan, he is reported to have stayed in the Beit ur Salam guesthouse, a safe house reserved exclusively for graduates of Al Qaeda training camps.

Then in 1999, he was in Germany training terrorists in a local Islamist cell how to build car bombs and other explosive devices to blow up Americans vacationing in Europe. He was also alleged, in August 2002, to have met two other men in a suburban Columbus coffee house where they discussed terrorist attacks. The other two men were convicted of separate acts: Nuradin Abdi for a plot to blow up an Ohio shopping mall (of which Paul was one of the conspirators), and Iyman Faris (a Pakistani immigrant) for a plot to destroy the Brooklyn Bridge.

== Trial ==
Paul was indicted on April 12, 2007, on the following charges: conspiring to support terrorists, conspiring to use a weapon of mass destruction and providing support to terrorists. He was charged with planning to set off bombs in Europe and the United States. He initially pleaded not guilty. In 2008, he pleaded guilty to plotting to bomb targets in Europe and the United States in a plea deal to obtain a lighter sentence. According to public data search, he is no longer in prison as of May 22, 2024.

== See also ==
- List of notable converts to Islam
- Islamist terrorism

== Sources ==
- Andrew Welsh-Huggins, Hatred at Home: Al-Qaida on Trial in the American Midwest (Chapter 11,) Ohio University Press (2011) ISBN 0804011346
