= 2002 Columbus, Ohio shopping mall bombing plot =

Terrorist plot in the United States

Somali asylum seeker Nuradin Abdi unsuccessfully plotted to bomb a shopping mall in the city of Columbus, Ohio, United States. The plot was disclosed by federal authorities on June 14, 2004, when an indictment against Nuradin Abdi was unsealed by the local United States District Court. Abdi was part of a clandestine cell of al-Qaeda which sought to bring "death and destruction to Columbus".

== Background ==
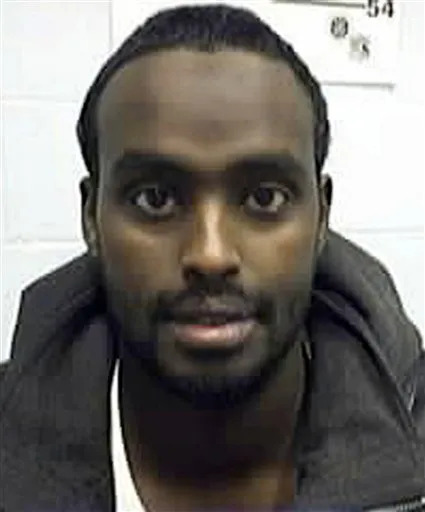
Abdi in an undated image released by Immigration and Customs Enforcement

Nuradin Abdi entered the United States as an asylum seeker from Somalia. He lived in a predominantly Muslim neighborhood on the north side of Columbus. According to one report, Abdi flew to Ethiopia to train in a military-style training camp in January 2000. There, he allegedly was trained in the use of guns, bombs, and guerrilla warfare. He returned two months later. Abdi met with Christopher Paul and Iyman Faris at a coffee shop in Upper Arlington on August 6, 2002. According to Paul (who was awaiting trial for a separate plot to bomb European tourist resorts), Abdi first suggested shooting up a mall, to which Paul responded "That's a stupid idea". Abdi subsequently suggested bombing the mall, but few other details were released.

== Arrest and proceedings ==
Abdi was arrested on November 28, 2003, and charged with conspiracy to provide material support to terrorists, conspiracy to provide material support to al-Qaeda, and two counts of fraud and misuse of documents. His attorneys became concerned with his mental state, and he was sent to a federal medical center in Minnesota in June 2004 to undergo tests. He was returned to Columbus in August 2004 and held in the Franklin County Correctional Facility II. On July 31, 2007, Abdi pleaded guilty to one count of conspiring to support terrorists. The other charges against him were dismissed as part of a plea agreement. Abdi was sentenced to 10 years in prison and would be deported to Somalia upon completion of the sentence.

New details released at the time of the plea agreement show that there were likely more than the aforementioned three people who were involved in the plot. Documents that were filed along with Abdi's agreement note a fourth person whom the trio met with both in Columbus and in Pittsburgh, Pennsylvania.

A 2011 NPR report claimed some of the people associated with this plot were imprisoned in a highly restrictive communications management unit.

In 2012, it was reported that Abdi was deported back to Somalia.
