= Effects of the September 11 attacks on Chinatown, New York City =

Effects of 9/11 on Chinatown

The effects of the September 11 attacks on Chinatown, Manhattan were extensive, encompassing severe economic disruption, labor displacement, public health consequences, and long-term social impacts. Located less than ten blocks from the World Trade Center site, Chinatown experienced both immediate physical isolation and prolonged socioeconomic challenges following the attacks.

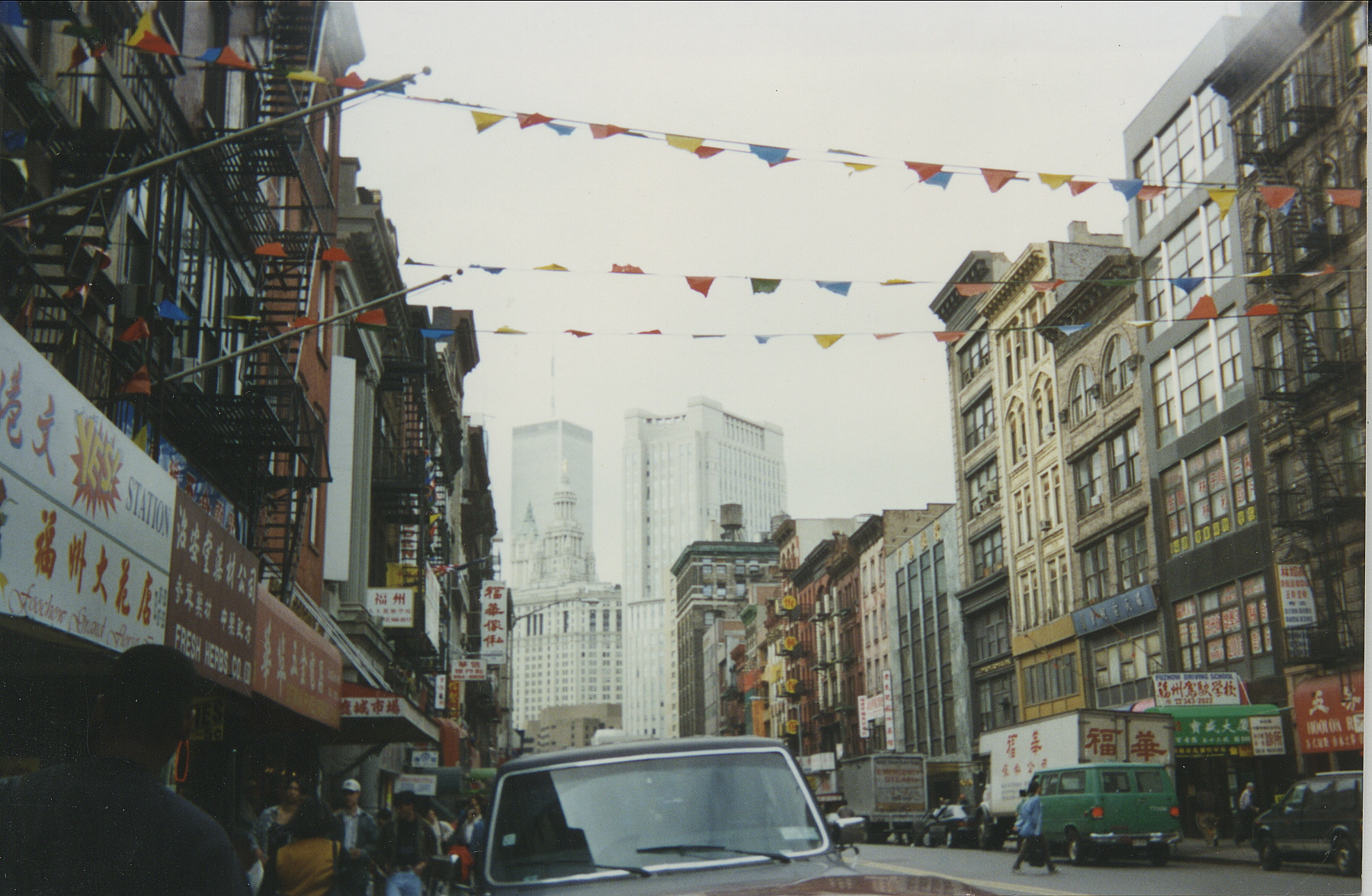
Chinatown, Manhattan, looking towards the World Trade Center. October 1995.

== Background ==
Chinatown is a dense ethnic enclave in Lower Manhattan with an economy historically dependent on small businesses, tourism, and the garment industry. The neighborhood has long served as a key entry point for Chinese immigrants, with many residents working within locally concentrated, community-based economic networks.

== Economic impact ==
In the immediate aftermath of the 2001 attacks, Chinatown was physically cut off from the rest of New York City. For eight days, all vehicular and non-residential pedestrian traffic south of Canal Street was prohibited, and access remained restricted for months.

Subway route limitations and communication outages further isolated the neighborhood, with some lines bypassing stations for six weeks and phone service disrupted for up to three months.

Within two weeks of the attacks, approximately 75% of Chinatown's workforce – nearly 25,000 workers – lost their jobs.

Economic hardship was widespread. A survey of 350 businesses found revenue declines ranging from 30% to 70%, and approximately 60% of businesses had already reduced staff. Lines for financial assistance stretched through the neighborhood, with crowds of hundreds of people waiting for aid.

== Long-term effects on businesses ==
The economic downturn persisted beyond the immediate aftermath. One year after the attacks, Chinatown businesses reported an average 20% decline in revenue compared to pre-September 11 levels.

Tourism-dependent sectors also experienced sustained losses. For local restaurants and jewelry stores, revenue generated from tourists was on average 40% lower during the summer of 2002 than it had been in the summer of 2001.

Chinatown's garment industry was among the hardest hit sectors. In the first three months after the attacks, 40 of the neighborhood's garment factories closed, followed by an additional 25 closures within the year, totaling 65 factory closures. Prior to September 11, garment workers earned an estimated $3.5 million in weekly wages. One year later, wages had fallen to approximately $2.51 million. Infrastructure disruptions prevented workers from accessing workplaces, while many production orders were relocated overseas and did not return.

Business closures became increasingly common. A 2003 New York Times article profiled the 32 Mott Street General Store, which was founded in 1891 and closed down post-9/11, after its owner reported that revenue "never recovered more than half [its] old level."

== Employment conditions and aid disparities ==
Approximately 8,000 workers remained unemployed months after the attacks.

An estimated $25-30 million was needed for job training and employment services, yet only $1.7 million was made available. Aid eligibility criteria and the geographic boundaries of the disaster zone further limited access to relief. Because 80% of garment factories were located north of Canal Street, many workers and business owners were initially excluded from federal assistance.

Additionally, high rejection rates for small business loans and limited access to capital further disadvantaged immigrant-owned businesses, many of which lacked the financial documentation or collateral required for assistance.

== Public health impacts ==
Exposure to dust and toxins from the World Trade Center collapse led to long-term respiratory issues among Chinatown residents. Among patients treated at the Bellevue WTC Environmental Health Center, 72% reported shortness of breath, 57% had chronic cough, and 39% experienced wheezing.

Children in Chinatown experienced elevated asthma rates. Studies reported asthma prevalence of up to 29%, compared to a New York City reference rate of 13%.

== Mental health ==
Mental health impacts were significant among affected populations. Studies of Chinese workers found that 19-21% met criteria for post-traumatic stress disorder (PTSD), while 33% experienced moderate to severe depression.

Despite these elevated rates, only 4-5% of individuals reported consulting a mental health professional. At the same time, 86% of respondents reported visiting a physician, with an average of 6.8 visits following the attacks. In the weeks following the attacks, Manhattan residents generally reported increased use of substances such as alcohol, cigarettes, or marijuana.

== Healthcare access and services ==
In response to ongoing health needs, New York City established the WTC Environmental Health Center at Bellevue Hospital in 2006.

By December 2006, the program had treated over 900 patients and had a waiting list of more than 700 individuals. Among participants, the majority were uninsured and had incomes below $15,000 annually – with clean-up laborers and residents of Lower Manhattan/Chinatown representing 77% of the patients.

== Community response and recovery ==
Community-based programs emphasized culturally and linguistically appropriate care, including multilingual outreach and social service support. Grassroots initiatives such as the "Welcome Back to Chinatown" campaign also aimed to restore tourism and economic activity.

Oral histories from Chinatown residents have further documented their experiences of isolation and recovery following the attacks. Chinatown has been described as a "forgotten neighborhood," reflecting perceptions that it received delayed recognition and insufficient aid compared to other affected areas.

U.S. Secretary of Labor Elaine Chao described the impact as "an economic shock wave ... but in Chinatown, that ripple was more like a tidal wave."

== Social stratification implications ==
The effects of the September 11 attacks on Chinatown can also be understood through broader sociological theories of social stratification, particularly those related to labor market segmentation, economic restructuring, and institutional inequality. These frameworks help explain why the economic disruption in Chinatown was both severe and unevenly distributed.

From a labor market perspective, Chinatown’s workforce reflects patterns associated with segmented labor markets, in which workers are concentrated in sectors characterized by low wages, limited job security, and restricted mobility. Many residents were employed in industries such as garment manufacturing and small-scale service work, which are especially vulnerable to economic shocks and shifts in global production. The large-scale job losses and relocation of production following September 11 mirror broader trends of deindustrialization and the declining demand for low-skilled labor in global cities.

The unequal distribution of post-9/11 aid further illustrates the role of public policy in shaping stratification outcomes. Research on disaster recovery has shown that access to relief is often mediated by bureaucratic requirements, language barriers, and legal status, which can disproportionately disadvantage immigrant populations. In Chinatown, geographic eligibility restrictions and documentation requirements limited access to federal assistance, demonstrating how ostensibly neutral policies can produce unequal outcomes across social groups.

The long-term consequences for Chinatown residents also reflect processes of cumulative disadvantage, in which economic shocks have more severe and lasting effects on populations with limited access to wealth, credit, and institutional resources. Because many households relied on low-wage employment and small businesses prior to September 11, the disruption compounded preexisting economic insecurity and slowed recovery.

Finally, the case of Chinatown highlights the importance of examining intragroup inequality within immigrant communities. Differences in class position, occupation, and access to resources shape how individuals experience economic crises. The impacts of September 11 were not evenly distributed across all residents, but instead reflected broader systems of stratification that produce uneven vulnerability even within the same ethnic group.
