= Authority for Use of Military Force to Combat Terrorist Activities Within the United States =

- United States Department of Justice memorandum
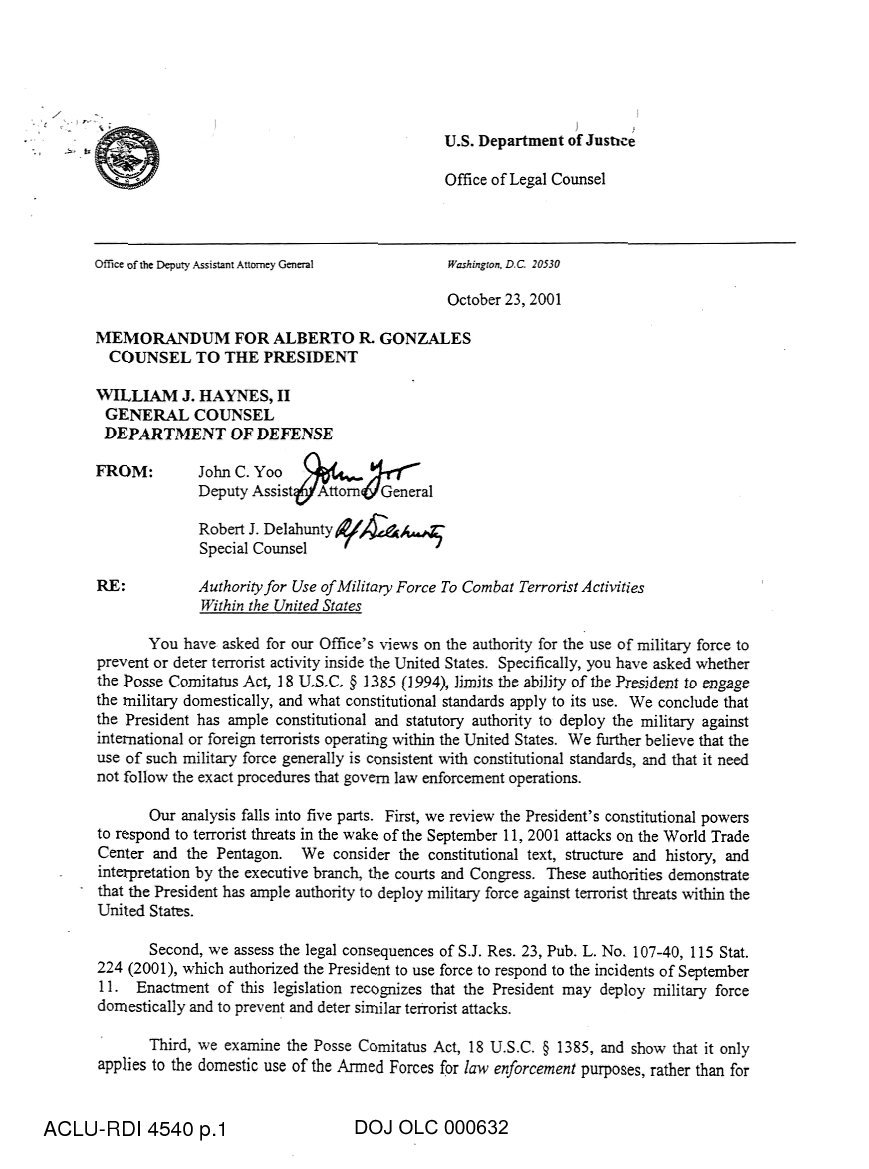

Dated
- October 23, 2001

Created by
- John C. Yoo: Deputy Assistant Attorney General
- Robert J. Delahunty: Special Counsel

"Authority for Use of Military Force to Combat Terrorist Activities Within the United States" is a 37 page classified United States Department of Justice memorandum dated October 23, 2001. This memo states that the President has both constitutional and statutory authority to use the military as a means to combat terrorist activity within the United States. This memo is a direct result of the terrorist attacks on September 11th 2001. Its existence is known because it was referred to in another Department of Justice memo. According to the latter memo, the former memo argued that the Fourth Amendment to the United States Constitution had no application to domestic military operations. The memo has been released to the public.

This decision was made using a five-part analysis. First it was found through interpretation by the executive branch of the Constitution that the President of the United States has the authority to "deploy military force against terrorist threats within the United States". Second, the enactment of legislation S.J. Res. 23, Pub. L. No. 107-40, 115 Stat. 224 (2001) was assessed for legal consequences and it was determined that the President "may deploy military force domestically and to prevent and deter similar terrorist attacks." Third, the Posse Comitatus Act was reviewed and it was determined that the act only applies to "domestic use of the Armed Forces for law enforcement purposed rather that for the performance of military functions." Fourth, it was determined that military intrusion into terrorist cells does not violate the Fourth Amendment. Fifth and finally the government has "a compelling interest in protecting the nation" and "the war effort would outweigh the relevant privacy interests" in regards to a claim of unreasonable search and seizure. The terrorist attacks that occurred on September 11, 2001, are unprecedented and thus the president's authority to deploy military force against terrorist threats is affirmed. The scale of these terrorist attacks has been viewed as a campaign against the United States and thus viewed as an act of war.

== History of federal forces in law enforcement ==
Members of the 1st Marine Division were used to control crowds in 1992 Los Angeles riots.

Over the course of the last two hundred and fifteen years the Army and Marine Corps have been used to intervene in domestic affairs and enforce laws. Federal troops have been used to control riots, protect minorities from violence, break strikes and guard the borders. Due to partiality and unreliability of state militias, Presidents have found that the use of federal troops was a much more effective means of controlling such domestic disturbances. The use of federal troops in recent times has lessened due to Presidents' preference to let state governors utilize state militias to handle issues within the states. Over the last two centuries laws regarding the use of Federal troops to regulate domestic matters have been augmented to reflect lessons learned from previous use of federal troops in civil matters. These laws are based on past experience and were not developed to handle new and unprecedented events such as domestic terrorist attacks.

List of US Military interventions on United States soil

1. 1890 - Wounded Knee Massacre
2. 1893 - Overthrow of the Kingdom of Hawaii
3. 1894 - Pullman Strike
4. 1898 - Battle of Sugar Point
5. 1899 - Colorado Labor Wars
6. 1901 - Crazy Snake Rebellion
7. 1914 - Ludlow Massacre
8. 1915 - Plan of San Diego
9. 1920 - West Virginia Coal Wars
10. 1932 - Bonus Army
11. 1943 - Detroit Race Riot
12. 1967 - Detroit riot
13. 1968 - King assassination riots
14. 1973 - Wounded Knee incident
15. 1992 - 1992 Los Angeles riots

== The necessity for authorized use of military forces within the United States ==
As unprecedented events occur in history it is necessary to examine current policies for adequacy. A federal law that "prohibits military personnel from enforcing the law within the United States" is an inadequate policy for addressing the global war on terrorism. In years prior to September 11, 2001, the Department of Defense narrowly focused on the military's ability to enforce laws domestically and not the President's authority to authorize such use of force.

== The effect on the United States judicial system ==
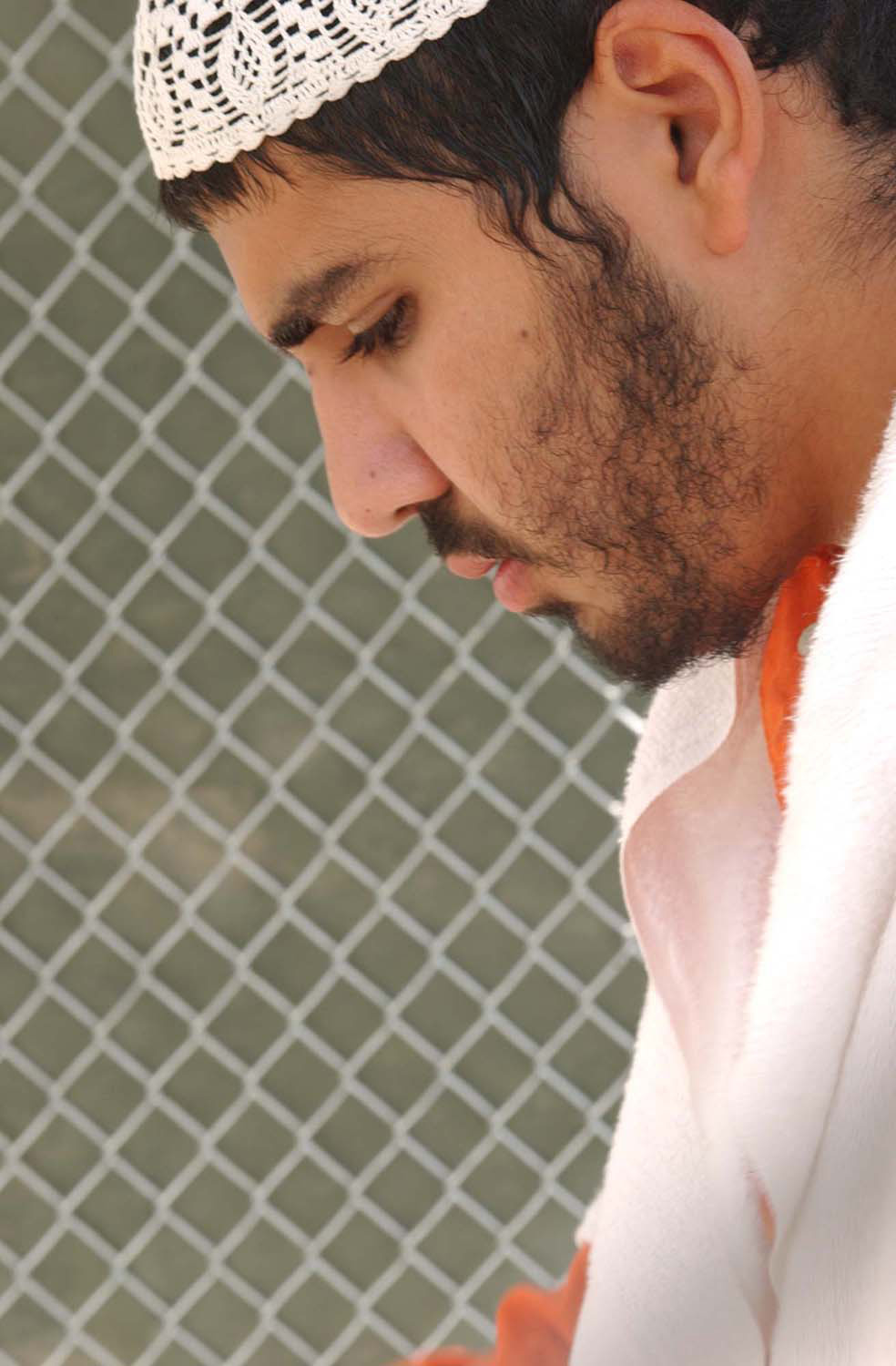
Hamdi during his detention at Guantanamo Bay.

The document pertaining to the "Authority for Use of Military Force to Combat Terrorist Activities Within the United States" has been mentioned in several Supreme Court cases. Two cases that stand out are the Hamdi v. Rumsfeld case and the Hamdan v. Rumsfeld case. These two cases are examples of challenges to the constitutionality of the "Authority for Use of Military Force to Combat Terrorist Activities Within the United States".

== Controversy over the "Authority for Use of Military Force to Combat Terrorist Activities Within the United States" ==
Other than the implications of this document in the Supreme Court this document has received criticisms elsewhere. A memo that originated from the U.S. Justice Department stated that the memo concerning the "Authority for Use of Military Force to Combat Terrorist Activities Within the United States" "should not be treated as authoritative for any purpose." This memo continues to highlight that the original memo was written in the time immediately after the September 11 attacks and therefore it is no longer relevant. The original memo stated that the use of military force domestically was not a violation of the fourth amendment, however in the more recent memo it is stated that this is no longer the view of the administration. The more recent memo also recants the statement that the first amendment could be suspended. It also continues to sort out any discrepancies.
