= Franklin County Correctional Facility II =

Prison in Ohio, United States

Coordinates: 39°54′25″N 83°01′15″W

Franklin County Correctional Center I
- Interactive map of Franklin County Correctional Center I
- Location: Columbus, Ohio
- Status: Operational
- Security class: Medium-maximum security
- Capacity: 650
- Opened: 1986; 40 years ago
- Managed by: Franklin County Sheriff's Office
- Director: Major Carl Trowbridge

Franklin County Correctional Center I (also known as Franklin County Main Jail or FCCCI) is a 650-bed medium-maximum security correctional facility located in Columbus, Ohio. It is located at 2460 Jackson Pike, Columbus, OH 43223. It opened in 1986.

== Misconduct ==
The jail came under fire in March 2009 when allegations came forward that a sheriff's deputy enlisted an inmate to touch a sandwich with his genitalia, then fed the sandwich to a fellow inmate. The inmate consuming the sandwich was then shown a cell phone picture of the first inmate's genitalia touching the sandwich. The deputy, Joseph Cantwell, pleaded guilty to two health code violations on September 9, 2009.

In late 2017, news reports indicate jailers at the facility had repeatedly used tasers to torture incarcerated individuals. Sergeant Mychal Turner used the device most often, including illegally on mentally-ill individuals. He was promoted to the rank of major and command of the site. Major Carl Trowbridge currently acts as the Facility Commander.
