= Muslim Surveillance Program =

NYPD informants in New York City

The Muslim Surveillance Program was conducted by the New York Police Department after the September 11, 2001 terrorist attacks to monitor Muslims in the city. The NYPD dispatched "Mosque crawlers" or "rakers" to surveil mosques and Muslim communities and act as informants to the NYPD. From 2001 until the program was exposed in 2011, the NYPD Intelligence Division employed these informants to photograph license plates of congregants, track the ethnic makeup of worshippers, and collect other information. These informants, sometimes called "rakers," also monitored other places where Muslims congregated, such as restaurants or student organizations, and in some cases attempted to bait people into making incriminating statements.

== Surveillance of Muslims by NYPD ==
The NYPD intelligence division began monitoring Muslims after the September 11 attacks with support from the CIA, which is legally prevented from monitoring US citizens on its own. The program monitored every mosque in the city, and "mosque crawlers" infiltrated dozens of mosques. The surveillance took place over a large geographical area and also included several mosques, restaurants, shops, and schools in New Jersey. Mosques in Pennsylvania and Connecticut were also targeted. Without any evidence of wrongdoing, the NYPD designated entire mosques as "terror groups," enabling them to spy on anyone who attended the mosque.

In 2011, the Associated Press exposed the program in a series of reports that won the Pulitzer Prize.

Two federal lawsuits were brought against the city for the spying, one by the American Civil Liberties Union in 2013. These lawsuits were settled in 2016. The settlement stipulated that the city should not spy on people based on their race, religion, or ethnicity, and that there should be some evidence of wrongdoing before spying on people. The New Yorker described the settlements as a landmark ruling.

In 2014, the Demographics Unit of the NYPD Intelligence division was disbanded, although data collected by the unit may still be used.
