= Iyman Faris =

Pakistani American

Iyman Faris (a.k.a. Mohammad Rauf; born June 4, 1969) is a Pakistani (formerly American) citizen who served for months as a double agent for the FBI before pleading guilty in May 2003 of providing material support to Al Qaeda. A United States citizen since 1999, he had worked as a truck driver and lived in Columbus, Ohio. As of September 2003, Faris was the "only confessed al Qaeda sleeper caught on U.S. soil." In 2003 he was sentenced to 20 years in prison for providing material support to Al-Qaeda. In February 2020 an American federal court revoked Faris' US citizenship. In August 2020, he was released from USP Marion in Illinois.

Faris was detained in Ohio two weeks after Khalid Sheikh Mohammed was arrested in Pakistan on March 1, 2003. While installed as a double agent for the U.S. government, Faris sent messages to his terrorist commanders by mobile phone and email from an FBI safe house in Virginia. A senior Bush administration official said, "He was sitting in the safe house making calls for us. It was a huge triumph."

== Early history ==
Iyman Faris was born in 1969 in Azad Kashmir, Pakistan. Faris came to the United States as a young man in 1994 on a student visa but never enrolled in school. In 1995, he married Geneva Bowling. Faris became a U.S. citizen in 1999.

He returned to Pakistan the following year, in 2000. His father had just died and his five-year marriage was ending. His ex-wife later said he had suffered from hearing imaginary voices and sudden bouts of believing that somebody was choking him.

Faris admitted to having met Osama bin Laden in Afghanistan. While in the region, Faris was asked to investigate the possibility of using an ultralight aircraft as an "escape plane" for bin Laden. He used an internet cafe in Karachi, Pakistan to research planes, buy cellphones and 2000 sleeping bags for training camps.

While living in Ohio, Faris had been counseled by a local imam for thoughts of suicide. After threatening to jump off a bridge, he was hospitalized for a psychiatric evaluation. Faris' five-year marriage ended in 2000.

== Brooklyn Bridge plot ==
In late 2001, while in Pakistan, Faris went to a travel agency to have some expired airline tickets to Yemen re-issued for several unknown colleagues. He claimed to be a preacher from Tablighi Jamaat, a missionary group.

In early 2002, Faris was introduced to an operative identified only as "C-2". He learned of a plot allegedly involving the simultaneous destruction of the Brooklyn Bridge by cutting through cables with blowtorches, and a second group that would derail a train in Washington D.C. Faris' investigations into obtaining the necessary tools for the dual-operation involved asking a friend where he might purchase welding equipment, and researching the structure of the bridge on the internet. He concluded that the operation was unlikely, and allegedly sent a message back to Pakistan calling off the plot, stating that "The weather is too hot".

== Working for FBI ==
On March 19, 2003, Faris was visited by two FBI agents and an anti-terror officer, who confronted him with testimony from Khalid Sheikh Mohammed about his contacts with al-Qaeda, and the results of an intercepted telephone call. Faris was reportedly accommodating, and agreed to let the agents search his apartment the following day.

Confronted by the FBI in April, Faris confessed. He agreed to cooperate with the FBI and work as a double agent, reporting to them. He was ordered to leave his home in Columbus and was assigned to a safe house in Virginia, from which he would appear to continue discussions with his contacts, reporting the information back to the FBI.

During this period, Faris told the agents that Majid Khan, a Baltimore youth who worked at his father's gas station, had referred to Khalid Sheikh Mohammed as an "uncle" and spoken of a desire to kill Pakistani dictator Pervez Musharraf. He later totally recanted this in a written statement provided in 2007 to Khan's Combatant Status Review Tribunal, saying his accusation was "an absolute lie," and he had been coerced into making the claims.

The United States took Khan into custody in Pakistan and sent him to a CIA black site in Afghanistan, where he was interrogated, allegedly tortured and held for several years. In September 2006, he was transferred to military custody at Guantanamo Bay as a high-value detainee.

== Criminal charges ==
The Department of Justice charged Faris in federal court with terrorism charges. On May 1, 2003, in a plea bargain, Faris pleaded guilty to both charges: providing material support and resources to Al Qaeda and conspiracy for providing the terrorist organization with information about possible U.S. targets for attack. The documents relating to the charges were not unsealed until June 19, 2003. Shortly after, the Department of Justice announced that it had used Faris as a double agent, who had worked under orders from the FBI. Faris is the "only confessed al Qaeda sleeper caught on U.S. soil."

On September 25, 2003, Faris sought to withdraw his guilty plea, claiming that while he admitted to meeting with Khalid Sheikh Mohammed, he had been seeking information about al-Qaeda for a book he wanted to write. He argued that Mohammed had given false information to authorities as revenge, for Faris had refused to be recruited into al-Qaeda by his lieutenant. The appeal was rejected. On October 28, 2003, Faris was sentenced to 20 years' imprisonment by District Court Judge Leonie Brinkema.

According to the New York Times, the Brooklyn Bridge plot was uncovered with assistance from the NSA eavesdropping program. The Times delayed publishing the story for a year ostensibly at the request of the government. The story was one of several that appeared in December 2005 by Eric Lichtblau and James Risen that won the Pulitzer Prize for National Reporting awarded by Columbia University.

Faris' new lawyer, David B. Smith, announced that he was looking into a lawsuit against George W. Bush, who personally authorized the wiretaps.

In 2004, the Department of Justice charged Nuradin Abdi in a bomb plot. It reported that Abdi had said that Faris had picked him up from the Columbus airport.
