= Fata Morgana (L'Rain album) =

Studio album by L'Rain
- Released: August 14, 2026
- Studio: Gary's Electric Studio (Brooklyn)
- Length: 39:30
- Label: Mexican Summer
- Producers: Taja Cheek; Ben Chapoteau-Katz; Andrew Lappin

L'Rain chronology
I Killed Your Dog (2023)	Fata Morgana (2026)

Singles from Fata Morgana
- 1. "Soulless Cycle" Released: June 10, 2026; 2. "Borderline" Released: July 8, 2026

Fata Morgana is the fourth studio album by Brooklyn-based experimental musician L'Rain. It was released on August 14, 2026, through Mexican Summer, as the final installment in a "quadrilogy" comprising her preceding albums. The album received universal acclaim from music critics.

== Background and composition ==
Fata Morgana was announced on June 10, 2026, alongside the release of its lead single, "Soulless Cycle". The album was described as the "culmination of a quadrilogy" that began with L'Rain's 2017 debut, followed by Fatigue (2021) and I Killed Your Dog (2023). Conceived with longtime collaborators Ben Chapoteau-Katz and Andrew Lappin, the album partly explores Cheek's experiences as a modern-day American citizen. The second single, "Borderline", was released on July 8, 2026.

In creating the album, Cheek intended it to be "the last part of a continuum" or "a summation, an encapsulation of what had come before". It revisits recurring themes in her music, including the death of her mother, "romantic uncertainty", "exhaustion", and the desire to create "something meaningful" amid the current state of the world. On Fata Morgana, Cheek approaches these themes by "looking directly" at herself.

== Critical reception ==
Professional ratings
Aggregate scores
Source	Rating
Any Decent Music	8.0/10
Metacritic	86/100
Review scores
Source	Rating
AllMusic	4/5 stars
Paste	9.1/10
Pitchfork	8.2/10

On Any Decent Music, the album has a weighted average score of 8.0 out of 10 from eight critic scores. According to Metacritic, it received "universal acclaim" based on a weighted average score of 86 out of 100 from seven critic scores.

Stephen Kearse of Pitchfork awarded the album the publication's "Best New Music" distinction, writing that Cheek is "more interested in mapping the crags of this strange elysium" than in seeking "escape" or finding "refuge". Kearse concluded that the album "reaffirms the guiding impulse" of Cheek's work, offering a unique "voyage" that only she "could helm", describing it as "not jazz but open to the occasional blue note".

Grant Sharples at Paste awarded the album an A−, describing Cheek's music as creating "sonic realms that feel both tactile and freeform". Sharples argued that the album could only have been created by an artist in "total control of herself", and that it demonstrates how seemingly opposing genres "can overlap as much as they disperse". Chris DeVille at Stereogum named the album its "Album of the Week", describing it as a "procession of meticulously constructed layers, moods, and vibes". DeVille characterized Cheek as a craftsman of soundscapes that are "minimal and lush all at once", arguing that her greatest talent might be "sound design".

== Track listing ==
All tracks are written by Taja Cheek, with additional writers noted.

Fata Morgana track listing
No.	Title	Writer(s)	Length
1.	"Rumors of Light"		0:37
2.	"With Time"		3:35
3.	"Blue"		3:57
4.	"July 5th"	Screechy Dan	4:00
5.	"Bedroom Songs"		1:11
6.	"Borderline"		4:24
7.	"Elmyra"	Ben Chapoteau-Katz	4:43
8.	"Soulless Cycle"		2:58
9.	"No Body / Know Body"		0:37
10.	"Glass Ceiling"		2:34
11.	"I Remember"	Leila Tamari	1:10
12.	"Birthday"	Chapoteau-Katz; Tamari	4:33
13.	"Church of No One"		5:11
Total length:			39:30

== Personnel ==
Credits adapted from the album's liner notes.

- Taja Cheek – arrangement, production (all tracks); sound design (tracks 1–3, 8, 9, 11), spoken word (1); lead vocals, background vocals (2–4, 6–8, 10, 12, 13); samples (2, 3, 5, 9, 13), guitar (2, 5), piano (2), electric guitar (3, 4, 6–8, 10, 13), vocal loops (4–6, 10–12), bass synthesizer (4, 7, 12, 13); acoustic guitar, guitar feedback, paintbrush guitar, ARP Odyssey (4); bass guitar (6–8), MS-20 (6); percussion, drum programming (7); feedback (8); synthesizers, breathing (10); vocals (11); phaser guitar, Wurlitzer, bell tree (12)
- Ben Chapoteau-Katz – arrangement, production (all tracks); modular synthesizer (2–4, 6–9), Prophet (2, 4, 6), sound design (2, 4, 7, 13), bass synthesizer (2, 9, 12), piano (2, 13); synthesizer programming, string synthesizer (2); polyphonic synthesizers (3, 7, 9), tenor saxophone (3, 12, 13), drum programming, Moog (4, 6, 8); vocoder (4, 6, 12), sub-bass (4); synthesizer sequences, Wurlitzer (6); monophonic synthesizers (7, 9), Kijimi (7); horn arrangements, Moog Rogue, Prophet, DX7, arpeggiator (12); Prophet-5, Minimoog (13)
- Andrew Lappin – arrangement, production, engineering, mixing (all tracks); percussion (1, 6, 7, 13), sound design (1, 7); foley, tape effects (1); micro loops, ankle bells, pangi shaker, talking drum (3); drum programming (4, 6, 7, 12), paintbrush guitar (4), loops (7, 13), granular loops (10), wah guitar (12), executive production
- Joe LaPorta – mastering
- Timothy Angulo – drum kit (2–4, 6, 8, 12, 13), percussion (2, 7), tambourine (3), brushes (13)
- Ryan Easter – trumpet (3, 12)
- Screechy Dan – featured vocals (4)
- Yuka Honda – additional production (5, 9, 11), album sequence
- Jay Rudolph – drum kit (7)
- Leila Tamari – vocals (11)
- Jake Sherman – Fender Rhodes, B3 organ (12)
- Kalia Vandever – trombone (12)
- Rena Anakwe – vocals (12)
- Joselia Rebekah Hughes – vocals (12)
- RaFia Santana – vocals (12)
- Tasha Viets-VanLear – vocals (12)
- Clifford Prince King – photography
- Geng PTP – design, additional artwork

== Charts ==
Chart performance for Fata Morgana
Chart (2026)	Peak position
UK Album Downloads (Official Charts)	28
UK Independent Albums Breakers (Official Charts)	16
