= L'Rain =

American musician

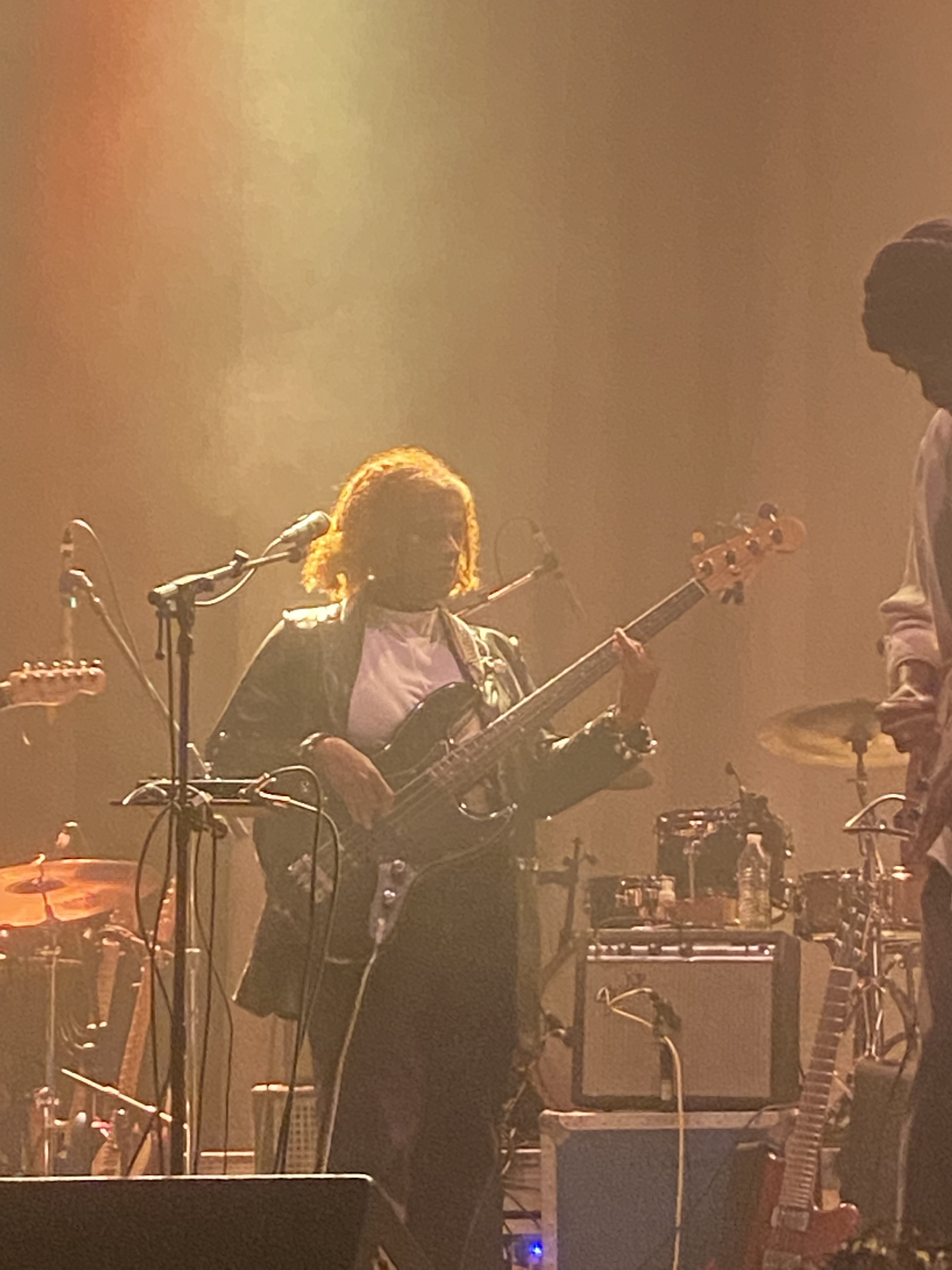
- L'Rain in Columbus in 2022

Background information
- Born: Taja Cheek
- Origin: Brooklyn, New York, U.S.
- Genres: Experimental pop, neo-psychedelia
- Occupations: Multi-instrumentalist, vocalist, composer, curator
- Labels: Mexican Summer, Astro Nautico
- Website: lrain.info

Taja Cheek, known professionally as L'Rain, is an American experimentalist, multi-instrumentalist, composer, and curator known primarily as the lead vocalist and songwriter of her eponymous band. L'Rain has been recognized for experimental music that draws on a vast number of traditions and genres in a practice and aesthetic Cheek calls "approaching songness".

Her self-titled debut, L'Rain, was included in best-of-year lists by publications including Pitchfork and Bandcamp Daily. Her second and third albums met with wide acclaim from dozens of outlets: for 2021's Fatigue, accolades included inclusion by The Needle Drop and The Wire on their album of the year lists; I Killed Your Dog was named among the best of 2023 by The New York Times, Rolling Stone, and Pitchfork.

She has collaborated with artists including Vagabon, Helado Negro, and Naama Tsabar, and performed with Kevin Beasley at the Whitney Museum of American Art.

== Early life and education ==
Cheek was born and raised in Crown Heights, Brooklyn, where she lived with her mother, father, and grandparents. Her father, Wyatt Cheek, worked in music marketing and promotion for entities including Select Records and Kiss FM; her grandmother ran a liquor store; and in the 1950s her grandfather owned a neighborhood jazz club. Cheek's mother, Lorraine C. Porter, taught physical education, health, math, and science in Brooklyn schools. The stage name L'Rain is an homage to Porter, who died before the release of the self-titled debut.

Cheek studied ballet and modern dance at The Ailey School and learned piano, cello, and Baroque recorder before picking up bass in high school, then forming and joining groups that included an Iron Maiden cover band. She attended Yale to study music but dropped the major, citing factors including a lack of diversity among the program's course offerings. She transferred to the American Studies program, where her major included a concentration in visual, audio, literary, and performance cultures; in 2011, she completed her Bachelor of Arts degree with distinction. While at Yale she worked as music director of radio station WYBC and booked shows.

== Career ==
After graduation, Cheek returned to New York, where she resumed playing in Brooklyn bands including Throw Vision, who released their debut in 2013 and an EP in 2015.

In 2017, Cheek released the self-titled L'Rain on New York City-based label Astro Nautico. She composed and performs vocals, keyboards, synthesizers, guitar, bass, samples, and percussion on the album. L'Rain also features Alex Goldberg, Jeremy Powell, Kyp Malone (of TV on the Radio), and Andrew Lappin, who co-produced the album with Cheek. Pitchfork included L'Rain among their 20 Best Experimental Albums of 2017, and Bandcamp Daily listed the release as #10 in their Best Albums of 2017.

In 2018, L'Rain (represented by Cheek and Ben Chapoteau-Katz) collaborated with producer Morgan Wiley and vocalist Patrick Gordon to remake the 1980s Chicago house track "Your Love" for a benefit compilation which paired electronic artists with formerly-incarcerated singers. The release, Bring Down The Walls, raised money for Critical Resistance, an organization dedicated to ending the prison–industrial complex.

L'Rain's second album, Fatigue, was released on Mexican Summer in 2021. Fatigue was named album of the year by The Wire, included among the year's best by Pitchfork, and met with wide acclaim from outlets including NPR. Cheek provides vocals and plays guitar, bass, synth, keyboards, piano, percussion, tape effects, and airhorn on the album, which features an expanded roster of twenty performers; these include executive producer Andrew Lappin, on guitar and programming, and co-producer Ben Chapoteau-Katz, who contributes synths, saxophone, vocals, percussion, and airhorn.

In August 2023, L'Rain announced a third album, I Killed Your Dog, released in October 2023; the album was co-produced by Cheek with Lappin and Chapoteau-Katz, who perform alongside L'Rain bandmates Zachary Levine-Caleb, Justin Felton, and Timothy Angulo. The album was met with best-of accolades from Pitchfork, The New York Times, Rolling Stone, Bandcamp Daily, and many other outlets.

L'Rain has toured with bands including Black Midi (2021), Animal Collective (2022), Sharon Van Etten (2022), Big Thief (2023), and LCD Soundsystem (2023).

In June 2026, L'Rain released the single "Soulless Cycle" as the lead single for her album Fata Morgana. The album is scheduled to release on August 14, 2026.

=== Curatorial work and public programming ===
In 2011, Cheek began working with arts nonprofit Creative Time; in 2014, as site manager for an exhibit co-presented with the Weeksville Heritage Center, Cheek installed and ran a pop-up radio station from a pink Cadillac parked outside the Utica Avenue A/C subway station. (The project was conceived by Otabenga Jones and Associates in homage to Jitu Weusi, black nationalist community arts center The East, and the Central Brooklyn Jazz Consortium.) The same year, Cheek––along with Ariana Allensworth, Salome Asega, Sable Elyse Smith, and Nadia Williams––co-organized "The Kara Walker Experience: WE ARE HERE", a public gathering of people of color at the Domino Sugar Refinery for Kara Walker's installation A Subtlety. In 2015, Cheek's work as Curatorial Assistant for High Line Art included helping to organize an installation and performance by Kevin Beasley.

In 2016, Cheek joined the curatorial team at contemporary art institution MoMA PS1; the same year, she also opened the basement of her Brooklyn apartment to experimental music events under the name 49 Shade (initially co-organized with Max Alper, Dann Lawrence, and Matteo Liberatore). 49 Shade presented artists including Kyp Malone, Miho Hatori, and Otomo Yoshihide, and Bartees Strange credits the space as introducing him to many of his collaborators. At PS1, Cheek co-organized Sunday Sessions and the Warm Up series through 2021; Warm Up lineups receiving extensive media coverage included a 2017 event with Cardi B, A$AP Ferg, and YATTA (of artist collective PTP); a 2018 show pairing Lizzo with experimentalists Gang Gang Dance; 2019's season opener, with Queens local duendita and Freddie Gibbs; 2020's livestream edition, with Eartheater and KeiyaA; and a limited-capacity 2021 event with Baby Tate and Patia's Fantasy World. As of July 2022, Cheek was listed as "former Associate Curator" at PS1.

In 2023, Cheek was announced as the first artist curator for BRIC's Celebrate Brooklyn! Festival.

In 2024, Cheek was appointed artistic director of Performance Space New York.

== Musical style ==
L'Rain often layers and loops her vocals, and her work frequently features samples from her collection of hundreds of field recordings, some pitch-shifted or otherwise manipulated beyond recognition. She has spoken in interviews about her work's tendency to evade or reject categorization, saying that she is "more interested in a Barthes, Death of the Author, approach to genre", values illegibility, and seeks to complicate assumptions about the relationship between identity and aesthetics: "I’m hyper-aware of how marketing and packaging happens for Black people and women and Black women [...] I like feeling a sense of agency in how those stories are told".

AllMusic described L'Rain as making "dreamy, genre-blurring music [...], reflecting on grief, change, joy, and resistance through a collage-like mixture of soul, psychedelia, gospel, musique concrète, and numerous other genres." Pitchfork described her 2021 album Fatigue as "painterly and methodical, daubing vocal loops over clattering percussion, sweeping strings, and resonant synths to create a shapeshifting strain of experimental pop." Reviewers have variously identified her style and influences as including free jazz, ambient, noise music, and disco; dance; "psychedelic orchestral pop" and "distorted shoegaze"; krautrock, outsider music, and hip hop; R&B and avant-garde rock; gospel, funk, and post-punk; and soul, drone, avant-pop, and musique concrète.

While Cheek is the sole fixed figure in L'Rain recordings and performances, she says the project follows a "more nuanced and collective [model]" than that of the "lone genius or creator": "I'm trying to find a way to nurture my own voice and singular vision, especially as a Black woman musician, while also acknowledging that I work collaboratively with a team that is essential to the project." Andrew Lappin and Ben Chapoteau-Katz are credited as Cheek's closest collaborators and co-producers of L'Rain's second and third albums; as of 2023, the band's members are Cheek, Lappin, and Chapoteau-Katz with Zachary Levine-Caleb, Justin Felton, and Timothy Angulo.

== Discography ==
=== Studio albums ===
List of studio albums
Title	Year	Label	Format
L'Rain	2017	Astro Nautico	LP, digital download
Fatigue	2021	Mexican Summer	LP, digital download
I Killed Your Dog	2023	Mexican Summer	LP, digital download
Fata Morgana	2026	Mexican Summer	LP, digital download
