= The Sun Rises in the East (film) =

Documentary film

- Directed by: Tayo Giwa
- Written by: Tayo Giwa & Cynthia Gordy Giwa
- Produced by: Tayo Giwa & Cynthia Gordy Giwa
- Cinematography: Christina Wairegi
- Edited by: Herman Jean-Noel
- Distributed by: Indie Rights
- Release dates: May 2022 (New York African Film Festival); May 12, 2023
- Running time: 58 minutes
- Country: United States
- Language: English

The Sun Rises in The East is an independent documentary film created by Tayo Giwa and Cynthia Gordy Giwa. It is the first feature-length film to examine the history of The East, a Black cultural organization and meeting place formed in 1969 by teens and young adults in Bedford-Stuyvesant, Brooklyn.

== Synopsis ==
Through first-hand interviews with founding members and people who grew up in the organization as children, archival photographs, and videos, The Sun Rises in The East depicts the reverberating impact of the organization co-founded by educator and community leader Jitu Weusi.

The film shows how The East organized itself around the principle of Black self-determination, developing an independent African-centered school, daycare, restaurant, newspaper, bookstore, clothing shop, and food co-op, among other businesses. The film also depicts how the collective attracted notable figures within the Black Arts Movement to perform at its renowned performance venue—from poets like Gil Scott-Heron, Sonia Sanchez, and Haki R. Madhubuti, to musical legends such as Max Roach, Betty Carter, Sonny Rollins, Roy Ayers, Sun Ra, and Pharoah Sanders, among others. Beyond highlighting The East at its pinnacle, the Giwas also examine the challenges that led to the organization's eventual breakdown, including gender politics, government surveillance, and financial challenges.

The Giwas created the film to bring the story of the organization's influential yet little-known history to a broader audience.

== Release ==
The Sun Rises in The East debuted at the Brooklyn Academy of Music on February 24, 2022. The Giwas were invited to screen the film at multiple festivals including the New York African Film Festival hosted at Lincoln Center, Martha's Vineyard African American Film Festival, BronzeLens Film Festival, and Sidewalk Film Festival. The documentary earned an African Movie Academy Award nomination in 2022 for Best Diaspora Documentary, and was featured by The New York Times.

The documentary was acquired for digital distribution globally by Indie Rights and released for streaming on Amazon Prime, Tubi, Google Play, and YouTube in May 2023.
