= They Must Go =

Book written by Rabbi Meir Kahane (1981)

- Author: Rabbi Meir Kahane
- Language: English
- Genre: Political
- Publisher: Grosset & Dunlap
- Publication date: 1981
- ISBN: 9781478388913

They Must Go is an English-language book created by Rabbi Meir Kahane in 1981 and published via Grosset & Dunlap.

== Plot and history ==
The rising Arab population in Israel, a country that should be a Jewish-only to major Jewish majority country according to Meir Kahane's ideology of Kahanism, is a call for concern by Meir Kahane dealing with the aspirations of the formation of a non-Arab Israel calling the allowing of Arabs to live in Israel a "national suicide". In the book, Kahane calls for a permanent and non-negotiable Jewish majority and an insignificant Arab minority while maintaining the Arab minority as second class citizens through an apartheid-like system. Kahane states that a lot of Arabs are better off in their lands and complete separation and segregation of Arabs and non-Arabs in Israel, with Arabs having the choice to leave or be forcibly expelled. The book also calls for the complete annexation of the State of Palestine, from the Gaza Strip and the West Bank. Meir Kahane wrote this book in 1980 as he served a 6-month sentence in the Ramla maximum security prison, according to Kahane, the guards allowed him paper and other writing utensils due to the guards being "sympathetic" towards Kahane as he was serving his sentence, though the prison guards would not allow him to bring in his newspaper extractions and other private papers during his time in prison. This allowed him to finish a rough draft of the book which would be published soon after his prison sentence would be completely served. The book became popular among Jewish supremacists and Kahanists in Israel and the United States, especially throughout the factions of the Canada and United States based terrorist organization the Jewish Defense League due to the books contents of Islamophobia and anti-Arab racism in the establishment of an apartheid-like state.

== See also ==
- Uncomfortable Questions for Comfortable Jews
