= Kevin Beasley =

American artist

- Born: 1985 (age 40–41); Lynchburg, Virginia, US

Kevin Beasley (born 1985) is an American artist working in sculpture, performance art, and sound installation. He lives and works in New York City. Beasley was included in the Whitney Museum of American Art's Biennial in 2014 and MoMA PS1's Greater New York exhibition in 2015.

== Education and early life ==
Kevin Beasley was born in Lynchburg, Virginia. He received a BFA from the College for Creative Studies in Detroit, Michigan in 2007 and an MFA from Yale in 2012.

== Work ==
Beasley is known for sculpture that incorporates found materials - especially clothing - and casting materials like resin and foam. While these materials cure or set into their final state, Beasley works them with his body, a process that points to his interest in sculpture that carries traces of the artist's body while retaining a bodily, fleshy quality of its own. Many of his sculptures also contain audio equipment or are used in sound-based installations or performances.

== Notable exhibitions ==
Beasley was included in the Whitney Museum of American Art's 2014 Whitney Biennial. Beasley created a site-specific installation consisting of several sculptures with embedded microphones to pick up the ambient signs of the Biennial and its visitors. The sculptures incorporated sneakers and cast plastics, common materials in Beasley's work.

Beasley was also included in the Museum of Modern Art's 2014-15 exhibition Cut to Swipe, which focused on electronic and new media works.

In 2015, the Solomon R. Guggenheim Museum included two works by Beasley in the exhibition Storylines: Contemporary Art at the Guggenheim. Strange Fruit: Part I and Strange Fruit: Part II are assemblages of shoes and other found materials with embedded microphones and speakers that reflect ambient sound back to museum visitors. The reference to the iconic protest song "Strange Fruit" and the use of Air Jordans in the sculpture point not only to the bodies of the visitors, but to Black bodies throughout history. Strange Fruit: Part I and Strange Fruit: Part II were commissioned by the Young Collector's Council of the Solomon R. Guggenheim Museum for Storylines and are now part of the museum's collection.

Beasley participated in the Studio Museum in Harlem's 2014 exhibition Material Histories at the culmination of an 11 month residency at the museum from 2013-14. Material Histories showcased work by Beasley and two other artists-in-residence during the same period.

Beasley's solo exhibition, "A view of a landscape", is currently on view at the Whitney Museum of American Art from Dec 15, 2018–Mar 10, 2019. It is his first solo exhibit at a New York museum. The exhibition features an immersive installation that centers around a cotton gin motor from Maplesville, Alabama and the history of his family's land in the American South. The installation focuses on the sensorial, through the visual and auditory distillation of the cotton gin throughout the space. In addition, a series of live performances (solo and collaborative) and talks are programmed throughout the run of the exhibition.

== Performances ==
Beasley is also known for his performance work, in which he often uses his sculptures to produce live sound. For a performance during the 2014 Whitney Biennial, Beasley "played" several of his sculptures by touching and moving them around the gallery. The sounds made by his body and the materials of the sculptures were captured by microphones embedded in the sculptures and amplified by speakers for the audience. Beasley also performs sound art without sculpture - in 2012 he performed I Want My Spot Back in the Atrium of the Museum of Modern Art - a piece consisting only of a capella clips of deceased 1990's era rappers, mixed and amplified by Beasley live.

Over the course of his 2018-2019 solo exhibition, "A view of a landscape" at the Whitney Museum, Beasley features live performances with: Taja Cheek, Eli Keszler, Jlin, and himself. The cotton gin serves an instrument in the performances, where artists are able to manipulate and process its sounds into live compositions.

Commissioned by Performa for Performa 21, Beasley created The Sound of Morning (2021). With sculptures made by using everyday objects and materials, performers, and mics that magnify noise, Beasley combined sculpture, sound, performance, and site specificity for this work.

== Collections ==
- Pérez Art Museum Miami
- The Solomon R. Guggenheim Museum
- The Museum of Modern Art
- San Francisco Museum of Modern Art
- Tate Modern
- Dallas Museum of Art
- Albright-Knox Art Gallery
