= Joseph Churba =

Joseph Churba (c. 1934 – April 18, 1996) was a United States Air Force Middle East intelligence expert, author, and political activist. Churba was born in Brooklyn, New York City into a Jewish family that was originally from Syria.

== Career ==
In 1965 he and a college friend, Meir Kahane, who later founded the Jewish Defense League, founded the "July Fourth Movement" to promote support for American involvement in the Vietnam War among college students.

In 1976 he publicly criticized a statement by the Chairman of the Joint Chiefs of Staff, General George S. Brown. Brown had said that Israel was a "military burden" to the United States. Churba told a newspaper reporter that Brown's statement was "dangerously irresponsible" since it gave the impression to other nations that United States support for Israel's defense had weakened. After this incident his security clearances were suspended and he left the Air Force soon after.

In 1980 he worked as a campaign advisor for presidential candidate Ronald Reagan. After Reagan's election he served as an advisor to the United States Arms Control and Disarmament Agency.

In November 1991, Churba appeared before a U.S. Senate Foreign Relations Subcommittee on East Asian and Pacific Affairs to warn of the emerging nuclear threat from North Korea. Drawing from a recent symposium he conducted in North Korea under the auspices of his think tank, the International Security Council, Churba argued forcefully for a preemptive, nonnuclear strike against North Korean nuclear infrastructure. He cited the Israeli airstrike on Iraq's Osirak reactor in 1981 as a model and warned that diplomatic and economic tools were no longer sufficient deterrents. “The alternative is to leave the United States and its allies open to disaster simply waiting to happen,” he stated, noting that the military option might not remain viable in the near future.

== Education ==
Churba graduated from Brooklyn College in 1957, and from Columbia University in 1965 with a degree in Middle East studies.
