= I Killed Your Dog =

Studio album by L'Rain
- Released: October 13, 2023
- Studios: Wax Ltd (Hollywood); Gary's Electric (Brooklyn; Welterweight (New Paltz); Pulp Arts (Gainesville); Rosen Sound Synth Cabin (Burbank); Abbey Road (London); Striver's Row (Harlem)
- Length: 35:41
- Label: Mexican Summer
- Producers: Ben Chapoteau-Katz; Taja Cheek; Andrew Lappin

L'Rain chronology
| Fatigue (2021) | I Killed Your Dog (2023) | Fata Morgana (2026) |

Singles from I Killed Your Dog
- 1. "New Year's UnResolution" Released: June 6, 2023; 2. "Pet Rock" Released: August 23, 2023; 3. "r [EMOTE]" Released: September 27, 2023

I Killed Your Dog is the third studio album by Brooklyn-based experimental musician L'Rain. It was released on October 13, 2023, through Mexican Summer.

== Background and composition ==
Cheek announced the album on August 23, 2023, as a self-professed "anti-break-up" record. A press release introduced it as her "boldest statement to date" and a disclosure of the musician's signature blend of "indie dad rock and experimental electronics". Cheek intends to show "a bolder, brattier, more diabolical side" of her alias with the record, a "dip into darkness". The album explores her own idea of "a world of contradictions", described as "sensual" but "terrifying, and strange". When talking about the album title, Cheek clarified that it sounds "horrible" but evokes numerous things she thinks about "all at once". She concluded that the title was chosen to simply "evoke a feeling" out of the listener and that feeling is intended to "represent everything" Cheek is talking about in her lyrics. However, the musician also remarked that there had always been a studio dog everywhere they recorded for the album.

Soundwise, I Killed Your Dog finds the musician indulging in "swirling soundscapes" with a "more immediate rock and folk influence", as it showcases "a crystallization of L'Rain's tactile approach to songwriting". The musician experiments with "rock music tropes", "the lineage of folk as Black music in America" and her experiences with playing in "guitar bands". Cheek enlisted frequent collaborators Andrew Lappin and Ben Chapoteau-Katz for the record.

== Singles ==
"New Year's UnResolution", a "quiet explosion of synths and drums", served as the lead single and was released on June 6, 2023. It forges into the topic of a relationship demise and echoes moments immediately after a breakup as well as the ensuing years when memories erode. The second single "Pet Rock" was unveiled alongside the album announcement on August 23, accompanied by a music video filled with miniatures. She wrote the song "a long time ago" and described it as an "ode to the white dad rock" she had never listened to.

== Critical reception ==
Professional ratings
Aggregate scores
| Source | Rating |
|---|---|
| Metacritic | 87/100 |
Review scores
| Source | Rating |
| AllMusic | 4/5 stars |
| MusicOMH | 4/5 stars |
| Paste | 9.1/10 |
| Pitchfork | 8.7/10 |
| The Skinny | 4/5 stars |

I Killed Your Dog received a score of 87 out of 100 on review aggregator Metacritic based on six critics' reviews, indicating "universal acclaim". Pitchfork awarded the album their "Best New Music" distinction, with Stephen Kearse writing that it "revamps L'Rain's typically introspective music into baroque dreamscapes" and the album is "more bold and brash than previous L'Rain records, every harmony, loop, and skit engorged with verve".

Pitchfork ranked it the 12th best album of 2023.

== Track listing ==
All tracks are written by Taja Cheek.

I Killed Your Dog track listing
| No. | Title | Length |
|---|---|---|
| 1. | "Sincerity Commercial" | 0:34 |
| 2. | "Our Funeral" | 2:55 |
| 3. | "Pet Rock" | 2:45 |
| 4. | "I Hate My Best Friends" | 1:08 |
| 5. | "I Killed Your Dog" | 3:29 |
| 6. | "All the Days You Remember" | 0:23 |
| 7. | "5 to 8 Hours a Day (WWwaG)" | 4:30 |
| 8. | "Sometimes" | 1:07 |
| 9. | "r (Emote)" | 3:41 |
| 10. | "Uncertainty Principle" | 3:35 |
| 11. | "Oh Wow, a Bird!" | 0:04 |
| 12. | "Knead Bee" | 2:49 |
| 13. | "Monsoon of Regret" | 0:33 |
| 14. | "Clumsy" | 2:53 |
| 15. | "What's That Song?" | 0:20 |
| 16. | "New Year's UnResolution" | 4:55 |
| Total length: | | 35:41 |

== Personnel ==
- Taja Cheek – vocals, production, arrangement, tracklist sequencing
- Andrew Lappin – production, mixing, engineering, arrangement, tracklist sequencing, executive production
- Ben Chapoteau-Katz – production, arrangement, tracklist sequencing
- Heba Kadry – mastering
- Jake Aron – mixing
- Ryan Dieringer – engineering (tracks 2, 3, 9, 10, 16)
- George Oulton – engineering (10)
- Neil Dawes – engineering (10)
- Danny Clifton – engineering assistance
- Davis Hart – engineering assistance
- Lily Ruckstuhl – engineering assistance
- Robert Aceto – engineering assistance
- Kyle Poole – additional engineering (15)
- Chris Connors – additional editing (2, 16)
- Daniel Lopatin – tracklist sequencing
- Alex Tults – layout, design
- Tonje Thielsen – photography
