= Uncomfortable Questions for Comfortable Jews =

1987 book by Rabbi Meir Kahane

- Author: Rabbi Meir Kahane
- Language: English
- Genre: Political
- Publisher: Lyle Stuart
- Publication date: 1987
- ISBN: 9780818404382

Uncomfortable Questions for Comfortable Jews is a 1987 book by Rabbi Meir Kahane, published by Lyle Stuart.

Uncomfortable Questions for Comfortable Jews is a manifesto that espouses oppositional beliefs against modern-day Israel. This includes forming the Israeli government as a Western-styled democracy and the allowing of non-Jews, especially Arabs, to become a majority ethnic group in the Jewish state of Israel. According to Kahane, the ideology of Zionism cannot exist without the sentiments of Kahanism. He also writes against the crime of racism he was charged with in 1980, stating that without the beliefs of racism and anti-Arabism a Jewish state cannot thrive and deems it hypocritical that he was charged with racism for wanting a majority Jewish state with the implications of apartheid in Israel.

As in his book They Must Go, Kahane calls for complete racial segregation of Palestinian Arabs and Arabs in general with Jews in Israel, but in this book he also puts out the ideas that Arabs may attempt to get with young Jewish women to either convert them to Islam or rape them. Kahane also states in the book that Israel is "schizophrenic" for wanting both a Zionist state and a democratic state while maintaining its Jewish majority. It's urged in the book that American Jews make aliyah and emigrate to Israel as a mitzvah and is considered obligated by all Jews around the world.

== Publication details ==
- Kahane, Meir (1987). Uncomfortable Questions for Comfortable Jews. Lyle Stuart. ISBN 978-0-8184-0438-2.

== See also ==
- They Must Go
