= 1968 New York City teachers' strike =

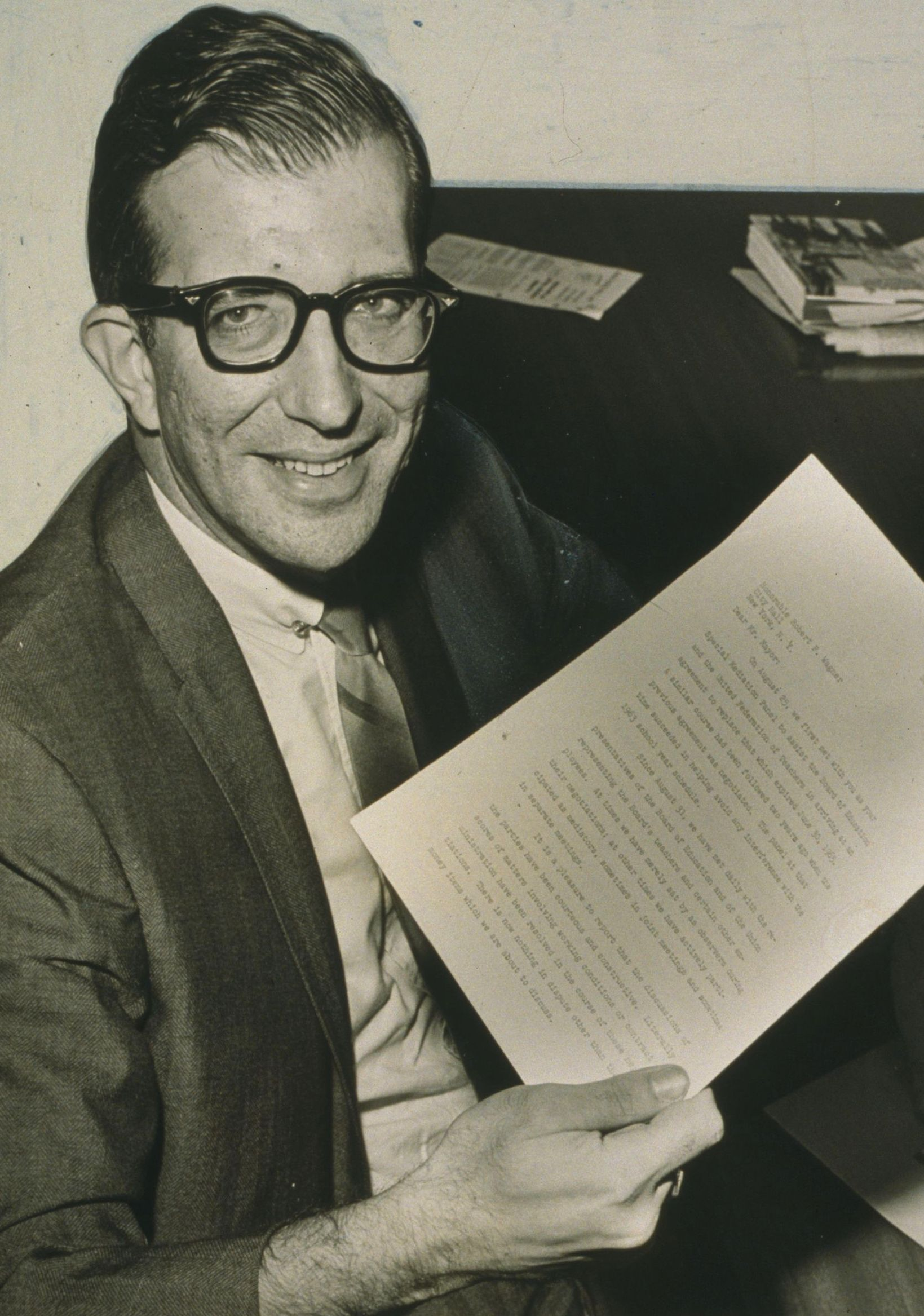
Albert Shanker

The 1968 New York City teachers' strike was a months-long confrontation between the new community-controlled school board in the largely black Ocean Hill–Brownsville neighborhoods of Brooklyn and New York City's United Federation of Teachers. It began with a one-day walkout in the Ocean Hill–Brownsville school district in May 1968, and escalated to a citywide strike in September of that year, shutting down the public schools for a total of 36 days and increasing racial tensions between Black and Jewish Americans.

Thousands of New York City teachers went on strike when the school board of the neighborhood, which is now two separate neighborhoods, fired nineteen teachers and administrators without notice. The newly created school district, in a heavily black neighborhood, was an experiment in community control over schools, and those dismissed were almost all Jewish.

The United Federation of Teachers (UFT), led by Albert Shanker, demanded the teachers' reinstatement and accused the community-controlled school board of antisemitism. At the start of the school year in September 1968, the UFT held a strike that shut down New York City's public schools for nearly two months, leaving a million students without schools to attend.

The strike pitted the community against the union, highlighting a conflict between the locals' right to self-determination and teachers' universal rights as workers. Although the school district itself was quite small, the outcome of its experiment had great significance because of its potential to alter the entire educational system—in New York City and elsewhere. As one historian wrote in 1972: "If these seemingly simple acts had not been such a serious threat to the system, it would be unlikely that they would produce such a strong and immediate response."

== Background ==
=== Brownsville ===
From the 1880s through the 1960s, Brownsville was predominantly Jewish and politically radical. The Jewish population consistently elected socialist and American Labor Party candidates to the state assembly and was a strong supporter of unionized labor and collective bargaining.

Black people made up 6 percent of Brownsville's population in 1940; this share doubled over the next decade. Most of these new residents were poor and occupied the neighborhood's most undesirable housing. Although the neighborhood was racially segregated, there was more public mixing and solidarity among black and Jewish residents than could be found in most other neighborhoods.

Around 1960, the neighborhood underwent a rapid demographic shift. Citing increased crime and their desire for social mobility, Jews left Brownsville en masse, to be replaced by more blacks and some Latinos. By 1970, Brownsville was 77 percent black and 19 percent Puerto Rican. Furthermore, Brownsville was frequently ignored by black civil rights organizations such as the NAACP and Urban League, whose Brooklyn chapters were based in nearby Bedford-Stuyvesant and were overall less concerned with the issues of the lower-income blacks who had moved into Brownsville. These changes corresponded to overall increases in segregation and inequality in New York City, as well as to the replacement of blue-collar with white-collar jobs.

The newly black Brownsville neighborhood had few community institutions or economic opportunities. It lacked a middle class, and its residents did not own the businesses they relied upon.

=== Schools ===
Whites on the neighborhood's periphery lobbied the school board against the building of a new school that would draw a racially diverse population. They were opposed by blacks, Latinos, and pro-integration whites, but nevertheless succeeded in functionally limiting the new school's racial makeup.

In the years before the strike, Brownsville's schools had become extremely overcrowded, and students were attending in shifts. Junior High School 271, which became the nexus of the strike, was constructed in 1963 to accommodate Brownsville's expanding population of youth. The school's performance was low from the outset, with most students testing below grade level in reading and math, and few advancing to the city's network of elite high schools.

New York City's school system was controlled by the Central Board of Education, a large centralized bureaucracy. Activists in the 1960s alleged that the Central School Board was uninterested in pursuing mandatory integration; their frustration led them away from desegregation and into the struggle for community control.

=== Teachers union ===
Brownsville's teachers were members of the United Federation of Teachers (UFT), a new union local. UFT was affiliated with the AFL-CIO, which included many workers in the region.

The UFT held a philosophy of limited pluralism, according to which different cultures could maintain some individuality under the umbrella of an open and democratic society. The union also championed individualist values and meritocracy. Some called its policies 'race-blind' because it preferred to frame issues in terms of class. The UFT contained a high proportion of Jews.

Membership in the American Federation of Teachers, the national union of which the UFT is a part, had increased dramatically during the 1960s, as had the rate of teachers' strikes.

Black leaders Bayard Rustin and Reverend Milton Galamison coordinated a citywide boycott of public schools in 1964 to protest de facto segregation. Prior to the boycott, the organizers asked the UFT Executive Board to join the boycott or ask teachers to join the picket lines. The union, however, declined, promising only to protect from reprisals any teachers who participated. On February 3, 1964, more than 400,000 New Yorkers participated in a one-day boycott, and newspapers were astounded both by the number of black and Puerto Rican parents and children who boycotted and by the complete absence of violence or disorder from the protests. It was, a newspaper account accurately reported, "the largest civil rights demonstration" in American history, and Rustin argued that "the movement to integrate the schools will create far-reaching benefits" for teachers as well as students. However, when protesters announced plans to follow up the February 3 boycott with a second one on March 16, the UFT declined to defend boycotting teachers from reprisals. Later, at the time of the 1968 school crisis, Brooklyn CORE leader Oliver Leeds and African-American Teachers Association President Al Vann would cite the UFT's refusal to support the 1964 integration campaign as proof that an alliance between the teachers' union and the black community was impossible.

==== Black schools and teachers ====
The UFT's program for poor black schools was called "More Effective Schools". Under this program class sizes would shrink and teachers would double or triple up for individual classes. Although the UFT expected this program to be popular, it was challenged by the African-American Teachers Association (ATA; originally the Negro Teachers Association), a group whose founders in 1964 were also part of the UFT. The ATA felt that New York City's teachers and schools perpetuated a system of entrenched racism, and in 1966 it began campaigning actively for community control. The UFT opposed both involuntary assignment and extra incentives for experienced teachers to come to poor schools.

In 1967, the ATA opposed the UFT directly over the "disruptive child clause", a contract provision that allowed teachers to have children removed from classrooms and placed in special schools. The ATA argued that this provision exemplified and accelerated the system's overall racism. In the fall of 1967, the UFT held a two-week strike, seeking approval for the disruptive child clause; most of the ATA's members withdrew from the union. In February 1968, some ATA teachers helped to produce a tribute to Malcolm X that presented African music and dance and glorified Black power; the UFT successfully asked that these teachers be disciplined.

== Community control ==
In the New York City school system, regulated by a civil service examination, only 8 percent of teachers and 3 percent of administrators were black. Following Brown v. Board of Education, 4,000 students in Ocean Hill–Brownsville were bused to white schools, where they complained of mistreatment. Faith in the controllers of the school system sank lower and lower.

Bolstered by the civil rights movement, but frustrated by resistance to desegregation, African Americans began to demand authority over the schools in which their children were educated. The ATA called for community-controlled schools, educating with a "Black value system" that emphasized "unity" and "collective work and responsibility" (as opposed to the "middle class" value of "individualism"). Leftist white allies, including teachers from the recently eclipsed Teachers Union, supported these demands.

Mayor John Lindsay and wealthy business leaders supported community control as a pathway to social stability. When in 1967 the Bundy Report, a creation of the Ford Foundation, recommended trying decentralization, the city decided to experiment in three areas, over the objections of some members of the white middle classes, who disliked the ideological tendencies that black-controlled schools might embrace.

The New York City Board of Education established the Ocean Hill–Brownsville area of Brooklyn as one of three decentralized school districts created by the city. In July 1967, the Ford Foundation issued Ocean Hill–Brownsville a $44,000 grant. The new district operated under a separate, community-elected governing board with the power to hire administrators. If successful, the experiment might lead to citywide decentralization. While the local black population viewed it as empowerment against what it saw as an intransigent white bureaucracy, the teachers' union and other unions saw it as union busting—a reduction in the collective bargaining power of the union, which would now have to deal with 33 separate, local bodies, rather than a central administration.

Rhody McCoy, the new superintendent of the board, had begun working as a substitute teacher in 1949. He worked in the city's public school system as a teacher and then principal of a special education school. He told the New York Times he was gentle but ambitious, and eager to change schools for neglected children. Some described him as a militant follower of Malcolm X, and the UFT opposed the board's decision to appoint him in July 1967. McCoy often frequented a mosque Malcolm X preached at and visited the preacher's home. McCoy was reported to be influenced by Harold Cruise’s book The Crisis of the Negro Intellectual and to believe Jews had too much influence in the civil rights movement. He nominated Herman Ferguson as the principal of JHS 271. Ferguson had penned an article in The Guardian in which he wrote his ideal school would have lessons on "instructions in gun weaponry, gun handling, and gun safety" as survival skills in a hostile society. The nomination was withdrawn.

=== Curriculum and school environment ===
Educational stratification in elementary schools was reduced significantly, with fewer grades being issued and one school even eliminating grade levels altogether. The curriculum was enriched by incorporating black and African history and culture, and some schools began offering instruction in Swahili and African counting. Additionally, one school with a large Puerto Rican student population became entirely bilingual.

Feedback from the 1967–1968 school year was largely positive, with visitors, students, and parents praising the shift toward student-centered education. Despite these advancements, the district remained dependent on the school board for funding, and many resource requests, such as for telephones and new library books, were reportedly addressed slowly or not at all. Teachers expressed surprise at the extent of control exercised by the school board, and many objected to its new policies regarding personnel and curriculum. The United Federation of Teachers (UFT) criticized the new principals and the Ocean Hill–Brownsville curriculum, arguing that fostering awareness of racial heritage might not be beneficial for students in the job market.

=== Personnel ===
Once established, the new administration of Ocean Hill–Brownsville began selecting principals from outside the approved civil service list. Among the five new principals appointed was New York City's first Puerto Rican principal, Luis Fuentes. The appointments were widely supported by the community but sparked anger among some teachers.

In April 1968, the administration sought greater control over personnel, finances, and curriculum. When the city refused to grant these expanded powers, parents in the district initiated a school boycott. The boycotts took place amidst growing unrest following the assassination of Martin Luther King Jr. on April 4, 1968. During protests at Junior High School 271, three teachers were injured.

On May 9, 1968, the administration requested the transfer of 13 teachers and 6 administrators from Junior High School 271, accusing them of attempting to sabotage the reform efforts. The individuals were each sent a brief letter, similar to the one addressed to teacher Fred Nauman, transcribed here:

The governing board of the Ocean Hill–Brownsville Demonstration School District has voted to end your employment in the schools of the District. This action was taken on the recommendation of the Personnel Committee. This termination of employment is to take effect immediately.

In the event you wish to question this action, the Governing Board will receive you on Friday, May 10, 1968, at 6:00 P.M., at Intermediate School 55, 2021 Bergen Street, Brooklyn, New York.

You will report Friday morning to Personnel, 110 Livingston Street, Brooklyn, for reassignment.

Sincerely,

Rev C. Herbert Oliver, Chairman

Ocean Hill–Brownsville Governing Board

Rody A. McCoy

Unit Administrator

This unilateral decision violated the union's contract. The teachers were nearly all Jewish. One black teacher included on the list, seemingly by accident, was quickly reinstated. In total, 83 workers were dismissed from the Ocean Hill–Brownsville district.

Parents in Brownsville generally supported the governing board. Outsiders appreciated the black school board's attempt to regain control over its own school system.

Shanker called the dismissals "a kind of vigilante activity" and said the schools had neglected due process. The Board of Education urged the teachers to ignore the letters. Mayor John Lindsay issued a statement countermanding the decision and condemning "anarchy and lawlessness" in the district. The dismissals were also condemned by the American Jewish Congress.

== Strikes ==
=== May ===
When the teachers tried to return to the school, they were blocked by hundreds of community members and teachers who supported the administration's decision. One sign displayed in the window of the occupied school read, "Black people control your schools". (At the same time, other teachers were staying off the job as per UFT instructions.)

On May 15, 300 police officers, including at least 60 in plainclothes, cordoned off the school (making five arrests), effectively breaking the parent blockade and allowing the teachers to return. The city's Board of Education and the Ocean Hill–Brownsville board both announced on the same day that the schools would close.

From May 22–24, 350 UFT members stayed out of school in protest. On June 20, these 350 strikers were also dismissed by the governing board. Under the terms of the decentralization agreement, the teachers were returned to the control of the New York City public school system, where they sat idle in the school district offices.

=== September through November ===
A series of citywide strikes at the start of the 1968 school year shut down the public schools for a total of 36 days. The union defied the new Taylor Law to go out on strike, and more than a million students were not able to attend school during strike days.

On September 9, 93 percent of the city's 58,000 teachers walked out. They agreed to return two days later after the Board of Education ordered the reinstatement of the dismissed teachers, but walked out again on September 13, once it became clear that the Board could not enforce this decision.

== Reactions ==
=== Black leadership ===
The NAACP announced support for the strike even though community control deviated from the official integrationist agenda.

The UFT strike did have support from black leaders Bayard Rustin and A. Philip Randolph, who had gained prominence in the labor movement as well as within the civil rights movement. Rustin and Randolph were shunned from the black community due to their position.

=== Dissent within the UFT ===
Not all UFT teachers supported the strike, and some actively opposed it with 1,716 union delegates opposing the strike and 12,021 supporting. A statistical study published in 1974 found that teachers—white and Black—of Black students were significantly more likely to oppose the strike. A coalition of black and Puerto Rican UFT members, supported by members of other local unions, released a statement supporting Ocean Hill–Brownsville and opposing the strike.

== Immediate effects ==
=== On schools ===
==== In Ocean Hill–Brownsville ====
Students and teachers returned to a chaotic atmosphere in the fall. Classes were held despite UFT picket lines outside.

Schools ran more smoothly in the Ocean Hill–Brownsville neighborhood than elsewhere, due to the fact that system was less reliant on the striking teachers and keys to the buildings. The board hired new teachers to replace the strikers, including many local Jews, in an effort to prove that the district was not antisemitic. The district's third graders were shown to have fallen from four months behind before community control to twelve months behind after it. The reading skills of the district's eighth graders were shown to have barely improved by the end of their time in ninth grade.

When the original teachers were restored to their posts at JHS 271, students refused to attend their classes. New York School Superintendent Bernard E. Donovan attempted to close schools in the district and to remove McCoy and most of the principals. When they refused to vacate their positions, Donovan called in the police. The returning teachers were told to go to an auditorium to meet with Unit Administrator McCoy. When they arrived they were threatened and bullets were thrown at them by audience members, a pregnant teacher was punched in the stomach as she left the auditorium.

==== In New York City at large ====
Striking teachers were in and out of school during the first weeks of the year, affecting over one million students.

Superintendent Donovan ordered many schools locked; in many places, people smashed windows and broke locks to re-enter their school buildings (sealed by union janitors sympathetic to the strike). Some camped on school grounds overnight to prevent further lockouts by janitors and custodians. Some were arrested on trespassing charges.

Other parents sent their children to Ocean Hill–Brownsville because the schools there were operational. Most of these outside students were black but some were white; some came long distances to attend the community–controlled schools.

=== Racism and antisemitism ===
Shanker was routinely branded a racist, and many African-Americans accused the UFT of being 'Jewish-dominated'. A Puerto Rican group in the Ocean Hill–Brownsville neighborhood burnt Shanker in effigy.

Shanker and some Jewish groups attributed the original firing of the teachers to antisemitism. During the strike, the UFT distributed an official pamphlet called "Preaching Violence Instead of Teaching Children in Ocean Hill-Brownsville", citing a lesson that advocated Black separatism. Shanker distributed 500,000 copies of a pamphlet some of his members found behind the schools in dispute worded "The Idea Behind This Program is Beautiful, But When the Money Changers Heard About It, They Took Over, As is Their Custom in the Black Community"

On December 26, on radio station WBAI, Julius Lester interviewed Leslie Campbell, a history teacher, who read a poem written by one of his students entitled "Antisemitism: Dedicated to Albert Shanker" that began with the words "Hey, Jewboy, with that yarmulke on your head / You pale-faced Jew boy – I wish you were dead." The poem then goes on to say the author is sick about hearing about the Holocaust because it lasted only 15 years compared to the 400 years blacks had been suffering. Lester suggested he read that particular poem. Campbell asked Lester "Are you crazy?" Lester replied "No. I think it's important for people to know the kinds of feelings being aroused in at least one child because of what's happening in Ocean Hill-Brownsville." The union filed a complaint with the Federal Communications Commission and tried to get Campbell fired. The incident further divided the black and Jewish Communities.

Some members of the school community, as well as the New York Civil Liberties Union, accused Shanker of playing up antisemitism to win sympathy and support.

Of the district's new hires, 70 percent were neither Hispanic nor black, and half of these were Jewish.

== Resolution ==
The strike ended on November 17, when the New York State Education Commissioner asserted state control over the Ocean Hill–Brownsville district. The dismissed teachers were reinstated, three of the new principals were transferred, and the trusteeship ran the district for four months. The conflict at Ocean Hill–Brownsville smoldered after the end of the strike. Eight people charged with harassing strikers counter-sued the city, alleging that law enforcement had been discriminatory and excessive. In 1969 some charged that the schools underwent "a purge of militant black teachers". When school opened in September 1969, the school district shut itself down for a day in protest of new regulations that deprived it of further autonomy.

== Aftermath ==
In the following weeks, hostility continued between the returning teachers and their students and replacement teachers. During the week of December 2 disorders by black students were reported in schools in four of the five city boroughs as well in the New York City Subway. They were said to be instigated by a rally held by the City Wide Student Strike committee organized by Sonny Carson and JHS 271 teacher Leslie Campbell.

Shanker emerged from the strike a figure of national prominence. He was jailed for 15 days in February 1969 for sanctioning the strikes, in contravention of New York's Taylor Law. The Ocean Hill–Brownsville district lost direct control over its schools; other districts never gained control over their schools.

The UFT crippled the ATA during the 1970s through a lawsuit, filed under the Civil Rights Act of 1964, accusing the ATA of excluding white teachers. The UFT also sought to cut off the ATA's sources of funding and remove its leaders from the school system.

Residents of Brownsville continued to feel neglected by the city, and in 1970 some staged the "Brownsville Trash Riots". When the schools agreed to impose a standardized reading test in 1971, its scores had fallen.

The strike badly divided the city and became known as one of John Lindsay's "Ten Plagues". Scholars have agreed with Shanker's assessment that "the whole alliance of liberals, blacks and Jews broke apart on this issue. It was a turning point in this way." The strike created a serious rift between white liberals, who supported the teachers' union, and blacks who wanted community control. The strike made it clear that these groups, previously allied in the Civil Rights Movement and the labor movement, would sometimes come into conflict. Some groups allied with the civil rights movement and Black Liberation struggles moved towards the creation of independent African Schools, including The East's Uhuru Sasa Shule in Bedford-Stuyvesant.

According to historian Jerald Podair, these events also pushed New York's Jewish population into accepting an identity of whiteness, further polarizing race relations in the city. He argues that the shift in coalitions after the 1968 strike pushed New York City to the political right for decades to come—in part because race came to eclipse class as the main axis of social conflict. The events surrounding the strike were a factor in the decision by Meir Kahane to form the Jewish Defense League.

== See also ==
- History of education in New York City
