= Bundy Report =

1960s New York City school decentralization proposal

Reconnection to Learning, better known as the Bundy Report, was a proposal to decentralize New York City schools in the late 1960s.

In the late 1960s Black Power movement, New York City activists advocated for "community control" of their schools, in which local schools would be governed by boards consisting of parents and community activists rather than by the centralized Department of Education. In particular, the African-American Teachers Association (ATA) advocated for community control of underperforming schools in black neighborhoods, such as Harlem and Ocean Hill-Brownsville (Brooklyn). Its leader, Jitu Weusi, also advocated for rights to create Afrocentric curricula. In response to this activism, the New York State legislature commissioned the Ford Foundation to recommend a partnership between parents and educators. The committee was led by the foundation's president, McGeorge Bundy. Their report, Reconnection to Learning, was better known as the Bundy Report. It proposed school decentralization, which would give local leaders decision-making control over curriculum. An experimental pilot program ran in 1967, backed by Mayor John Lindsay.

== See also ==
- New York City teachers' strike of 1968
