= Herbert Bomzer =

American rabbi (1927–2013)

Rabbi Herbert W. Bomzer

President and Chairman of the Political Action Committee of the Vaad Harabonim of Flatbush

Rabbi at Young Israel of Ocean Parkway

Chaplain for the New York City Department of Corrections at Rikers Island

Personal details
- Born: August 16, 1927
- Died: February 8, 2013 (aged 85)
- Education: Yeshiva University
- Occupation: Rabbi, scholar, educator
- Known for: The Kolel in America, The Chosen Road
- Awards: Honorary Doctor of Divinity from Yeshiva University (1985)

Rabbi Herbert W. (Chaim Zev) Bomzer (August 16, 1927 - February 8, 2013), was a prominent member in the American Jewish community. He was known for his expertise and erudition in Halakha (Jewish Law). Ordained at Yeshiva University, he received smicha from the revered Rabbis Joseph B. Soloveitchik and Moshe Feinstein. He held a Doctorate in Jewish Education and Administration, as well as a Master of Arts in Jewish History and Philosophy.

He was the President and Chairman of the Political Action Committee of the Vaad Harabonim of Flatbush and assistant professor of Judaic Studies at Yeshiva University, where he taught Talmud and Judaic Law.

A recognized expert in Orthodox conversion to Judaism, Rabbi Bomzer was given approval to conduct conversion administration from the Lubavitcher Rebbe, Rav Dvorkin, the Kaizmarker Rav, Rabbi Moshe Feinstein, and Rabbi Aaron Soloveitchik. He presided over conversions for more than forty years.

Rabbi Bomzer also served as a chaplain for the New York City Department of Corrections at Rikers Island.

He served two pulpits in his career, presiding over the building of a new synagogue, Young Israel of Ocean Parkway, during the second pulpit, which he held for forty years. As Rosh Yeshiva of Yeshiva University, he taught Talmud to over 3,000 students for over 50 years. As a Rabbinical leader, he served twice as President of the Rabbinical Board of Flatbush, was chairman and President of the Halakhic Committee of the Council of Young Israel Rabbis, was chairman and an Officer of the Committee for Hizuk Hadat of the Rabbinical Council of America, was an Officer in the administration of the National Council of Young Israel, and a board member of various organizations including the Union of Orthodox Rabbis of the United States and Canada (Agudath Harabonim), and the Iggud HaRabbonim and Poale Agudat Yisroel.

The recipient of multiple awards, Rabbi Bomzer has been recognized by Yeshiva University, which conferred an honorary Doctor of Divinity in 1985. A distinguished lecturer, teacher, and scholar, his 1985 study, "The Kolel in America" was published by Shengold Publishers. The Chosen Road, Rabbi Bomzer's influential book on conversion to Judaism, was first published in 1996. A revised edition followed in 2004, garnering a very positive review in the Jewish Press.

In 2010, he led a memorial service at Ground Zero in memory of Meir Kahane, where he recounted his friendship of 50 years.

In 2014, a grandson of Rabbi Bomzer, Aryeh Sklar, edited and published Rabbi Bomzer's sermons and notes on the weekly Torah portion (until the end of Leviticus), for the anniversary of Rabbi Bomzer's passing (yahrtzeit), entitled, "Keter HaRachzav" (Rachzav is the Hebrew acronym for "Rabbi Chaim Zev Bomzer"). Rabbi Aaron Ziegler, as well as Rabbi Moshe Kotlarsky, friends and colleagues of Rabbi Bomzer, wrote forewords for the book. In 2016, on the occasion of his wedding, Mr. Sklar published the completed book, including Numbers, Deuteronomy, as well as many separate essays and recollections of Rabbi Bomzer's teachers (such as Rabbi Joseph B. Soloveitchik and Rabbi Menachem Mendel Schneerson). Both the earlier publishing and the later more complete version were reviewed favorably by Alan Jay Gerber of the Jewish Star newspaper.
