= Jitu Weusi =

American educator and activist

Jitu K. Weusi
- Born: October 25, 1939; Brooklyn, New York
- Died: May 22, 2013 (aged 73)
- Education: 1962 from Long Island University (B.A. degree in History)
- Spouse(s): Aminisha Black; Angela Hope-Weusi

Jitu Weusi (born Leslie R. Campbell; October 25, 1939 - May 22, 2013) was an American educator, education advocate, author, a community leader, writer, activist, mentor, jazz and art program promoter. He is one of the founders of the National Black United Front, Jitu Weusi Institute for Development, and the International African Arts Festival. The festival started in 1971.

Weusi along with Aminisha Black and supporters were the founders of The East (East Cultural and Education Institution), Uhuru Sasa School (Freedom Now School), in Brooklyn for grades K through 12, the African Street Festival in Brooklyn which became the International African Arts Festival, the Central Brooklyn Jazz Consortium, Black News co-founder, founding member of the African American Teachers Association, and For My Sweet. For my Sweet is a cultural events and art gallery space in Brooklyn.

== Early life ==
Weusi was born Leslie R. Campbell in 1939 and raised in Brooklyn from a working-class family. He was born at St. John's Hospital in Bedford-Stuyvesant, Brooklyn. He graduated from Brooklyn's P.S. 54 in 1952. As a young child he worked at his cousin's newsstand. He says, that from working at the newsstand he was introduced to jazz by the men that would frequent the newsstand. His cousins took him to his first jazz concert. While in his teens Weusi worked as a waiter at the Village Gate in New York City where he met Thelonious Monk, and Nina Simone.

He attended Brooklyn Tech High School, and Franklin Lane High School. He received a basketball scholarship to attend Long Island University where he wrote his thesis on the history of Black Swan Records, the first African American recording company. It was titled "The Rise and Fall of Black Swan Records."

== Career ==
In 1962, Weusi started working for the New York City Public schools teaching Social Studies at Bedford–Stuyvesant's Junior High School (JHS 35). In March 1968 he was transferred to Junior High School 271 after taking students from his class to a Malcolm X memorial program.

In the late 60s, Weusi left the New York City Department of Education, and started the Uhuru Sasa Shule private school, which means in Swahili (Freedom Now School). It was the first Black independent private school in New York City. The school was developed to address the need for African American students to understand their heritage and place in history.

In 1985, he returned to teaching for Department of Education in NYC in many different schools for three decades, retiring in 2006.

=== New York City Teachers Strike of 1968 ===
In 1968 Weusi played a significant role along with other young educators such as; Randy Tobias, Al Vann, Oliver Patterson, Leroy Lewis, Joan Eastman, and Ola Cherry for community control of public schools during the teachers strike in the fall of 1968. The strike pitted the United Federation of Teachers against community control of school advocates coming after the new community-controlled school board dismissed white teachers, nearly all of whom were Jewish. The United Federation of Teachers led by Albert Shanker wanted and demanded that the teachers' be reinstated. It was a conflict between local rights and self-determination and the rights of teachers' universal rights as workers.

It was one of the largest teachers' strikes in American history. In 1967 four out of 865 principals were Black, and 12 out of 1,500 were assistant principals in New York City schools. More than 95 percent of the students in the public schools in the Ocean-Hill-Brownsville area of Brooklyn were Black and Latino and teachers were two-thirds white. During the 1968 strike over 500 New York City teachers went on strike. The strike lasted for 37 days, over a million students were affected by the strike. The strike came after controversy to integrate the public school system and community control with the school district called Ocean Hill, Brooklyn, Brownsville, Brooklyn.

Prior to the teachers' strike was the Brown v. Board decision calling for the integration of the public school systems through busing. In New York City the effort to integration the public schools met with resistance and gridlock. In Harlem and in Ocean Hill-Brownsville an alternative to integration and rezoning was the demand for local community boards and parent control of schools.

New York City Mayor John Lindsay in the spring of 1967 did grant "community control" to Ocean Hill-Brownsville and two other New York City neighborhoods. This was his response from White parents' complaints to busing to integrate schools. The New York City schools that were a part of the test experiment in community control of local schools were JHS 35, I.S. 201, and JHS 271. The project was approved by the New York City Board of Education (BOE) and supported by the Ford Foundation. The schools had a governing board of local parents and residents. Weusi described the community and teachers' movement as the “most underrepresented yet most impactful era of Brooklyn history." And that the battle between, “the teachers and the community battled the Board of Education and the predominately-white United Federation of Teachers in a struggle that they hoped would finally create a structure for the empowerment of local communities. The result was the establishment of the Ocean Hill-Brownsville Governing Board, a community school board that served central Brooklyn's Black Community."

In 1968, Rhody McCoy was the unit administrator of the Ocean Hill-Brownsville Demonstration School District project. He stated in a 1968 interview that the project of community control, and decentralization at the test schools were sabotaged by Albert Shanker, and the United Federation of Teachers. "We are convinced that the Establishment and this Society are determined to prevent blacks and Puerto Ricans from controlling their own schools." In regards to many of the white teachers that were removed; "Many of the teachers we removed were unfit. We didn't want them because they didn't think our kids were capable of learning." And that, " community control over its schools--a right which belongs to every other community."

In an interview with Julius Lester in 1968, Weusi explains that a poem written by a young African American student which spoke of Jewish teachers using hateful slurs, and include the line "I wish you were dead." The poem was aired on WBAI in New York City, which created a lot of controversy, and Weusi was labeled anti-Jewish. Due to the 20 year old controversy and negative publicity in the media Weusi resigned as co-chairman of African Americans United for David Dinkins campaign for the Mayor of New York City.

=== African-American Teachers Association (ATA) ===
Weusi was one of the founding members of African-American Teachers Association in the late 60s. It was an organization that was formed outside of the United Federation of Teachers. The African-American Teachers Association was organized to deal with the quality and issues of education in regards to Black and Hispanic youth in New York City. The ATA also formed the African-American Students Association (ASA) which established the school Uhuru Sasa Shule (Freedom Now School) in 1970. Weusi was the Headmaster for the school which was initially located at the East, 10 Claver Place, Brooklyn, NY. When the school grew exponentially it moved to the Sumner Avenue Armory.

=== The East ===
In 1969 Weusi, Aminisha Black and community supporters founded The East a community education and arts organization in the Bedford-Stuyvesant neighborhood in Brooklyn, NY, after quitting the New York Public school system. It was located at 10 Claver Place. The East closed in 1986. Such notable artists as Max Roach, Roy Ayers, Betty Carter, McCoy Tyner, Pharoah Sanders, Olu Dara, Freddie Hubbard, Leon Thomas, Lee Morgan, Dewey Redman, Rahsaan Roland Kirk, Last Poets, Sonia Sanchez, Betty Carter, Sun Ra, Gary Bartz, Randy Weston, Hugh Masekela, and many others performed at the East.

The East was a cultural organization, and known as a "family" in Brooklyn organized for people of African descent. The core group of organizers and participants were known as The East Family. It had multiple operating functions; a bookstore, restaurant, catering business, food co-op, a newspaper called Black News, a recording label, and a jazz venue. It was a pioneer promoter of Kwanzaa in New York.

Pharoah Sanders performed and recorded at the East. He recorded an album, titled "Live at the East", which was named after the East in 1971. The album was released in 1972 on the Impulse label.

=== Later life ===
In 1999, Weusi was one of the founding members of The Central Brooklyn Jazz Consortium (CBJC) and served as chairperson. The CBJC organized music festivals, venues, promotes local talent, and programs for communities in Brooklyn.

The Council of Independent Black Institutions (CIBI) was created in 1972. It came into being from five Black Power Conferences from 1966 and 1970.

In 1968, Weusi and Aminisha Black founded Uhuru Sasa, after Ocean Hill-Brownsville school battles for community control of schools. Aminisha and Weusi met during the Ocean-Hill Brownsville School campaign.

Weusi served as chair for the National Black United Front, and African-Americans United for Political Power organization which played a key role in the election of David Dinkins, the first African American mayor of New York City. The (BUF) was formed in 1980. Early founders of (BUF) were Sam Pinn who at the time was the Chairman of the Brooklyn Congress of Racial Equality (CORE), Al Vann, Herbert Daughtry, and as mentioned earlier Weusi who was in his early days known as Leslie Campbell.

In 1989, Weusi worked on mayoral campaign of David Dinkins, the first African American Mayor of New York City.

== Awards ==
The Brooklyn Community Board 3 voted to rename St. Claver Place to Jitu Weusi Way.

== See also ==
- Bundy Report
- United Federation of Teachers
