= L'Rain (album) =

Studio album by L'Rain
- Released: September 15, 2017
- Genre: Experimental
- Label: Astro Nautico
- Producer: Taja Cheek; Andrew Lappin

L'Rain chronology
L'Rain (2017)	Fatigue (2021)

L'Rain is the debut studio album by experimental musician Taja Cheek, who performs as L'Rain. The album was released in 2017 by New York City-based label Astro Nautico and included in best-of-year lists by publications including Pitchfork and Bandcamp Daily. The album cover is an image of Cheek's forearm, which is tattooed "L'Rain"; she chose the name after her mother, Lorraine, died during the making of the record.

L'Rain features Andrew Lappin on guitars, Alex Goldberg on drums and percussion, Jeremy Powell on saxophone, and TV on the Radio's Kyp Malone on backing vocals. Cheek composed and performs vocals, keyboards, synthesizers, guitar, bass, samples, and percussion on the album, which she co-produced with Lappin.

== Musical style ==
L'Rain has been recognized as an experimental album drawing on many traditions and genres; reviewers have identified the work's style and influences as including free jazz, ambient, noise music, and disco; R&B, post-punk, and avant-garde rock; shoegaze, psychedelic, hip hop, and outsider music; jazz, electronic music, and dream pop; soul and folk; and more.

L'Rain often layers and loops her vocals, and her work frequently features samples from her collection of hundreds of field recordings, some pitch-shifted or otherwise manipulated beyond recognition. She has spoken in interviews about her work's tendency to evade or reject categorization, and in an interview following the debut's release said, "I would hope that people would find elements of gospel, 90s r&b, and different genres of 'experimental music' (for lack of a better term) in my music, but I generally try to remain as illegible as possible. There is power in remaining indiscernible. I like to exist in a liminal space."

== Critical reception ==
Professional ratings
Review scores
Source	Rating
Pitchfork	6.8/10

Jay Balfour for Pitchfork assessed L'Rain with general positivity, calling it "a beautiful, untidy conduit of [Cheek's] grieving."

=== Year-end lists ===
Publication	List	Rank
Pitchfork	The 20 Best Experimental Albums of 2017	#17
Bandcamp Daily	The Best Albums of 2017	#10

== Track listing ==
All songs by L'Rain.

No.	Title	Length
1.	"Heavy (But Not in Wait)"	4:53
2.	"Stay, Go (Go, Stay)"	4:42
3.	"Bat"	2:22
4.	"Alive and a Wake"	2:28
5.	"Benediction"	0:36
6.	"A Toes (Shelf Inside Your Head)"	3:03
7.	"Go, Stay (Stay, Go)"	1:00
8.	"July 14th, 2015"	0:23
9.	"Which Fork / I'll Be"	6:58

== Personnel ==
Adapted from the record's Bandcamp page.

L'Rain

- Taja Cheek - vocals, bass guitar, electric guitar, percussion, samples, synths

Additional musicians

- Alex Goldberg - drums, percussion
- Andrew Lappin - acoustic guitar, electric guitar, nylon guitar, percussion, programming
- Jeremy Powell - saxophone
- Kyp Malone - background vocals

Technical

- Taja Cheek - production
- Jake Aron - mixing
- Chris Connors - additional mixing, vocal editing
- Chris Gehringer - mastering
- Andrew Lappin - engineering, mixing, production
- Sam Obey - A&R, remix mastering, sequencing

Artwork and design

- Jed Moch - album artwork
- Carlos Reyes - album artwork
