= Meir Kahane =

American and Israeli politician (1932–1990)

- מאיר כהנא
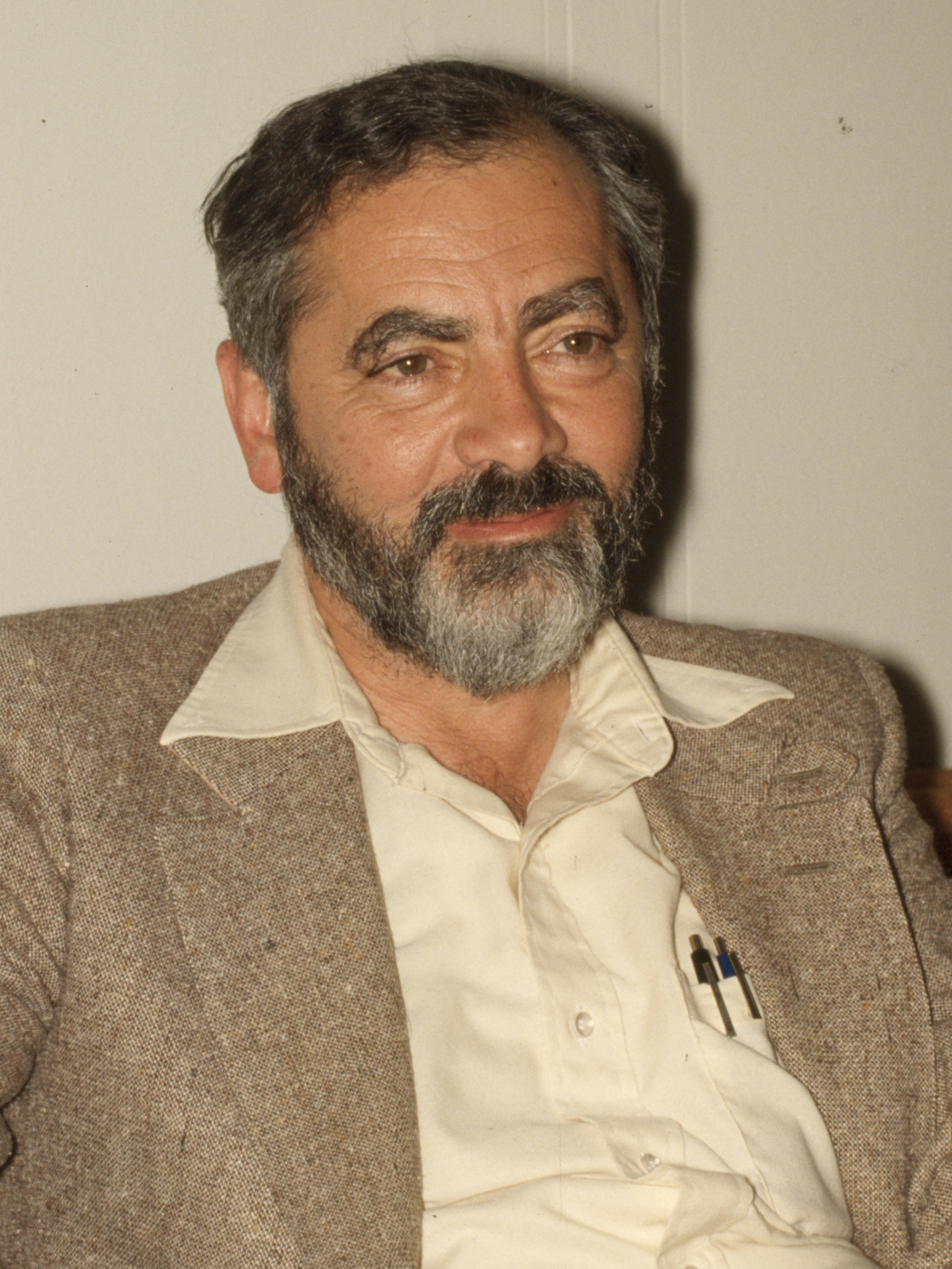
- Kahane in 1984

Faction represented in the Knesset
- 1984–1988: Kach

Personal details
- Born: Martin David Kahane; August 1, 1932 New York City, U.S.
- Died: November 5, 1990 (aged 58) New York City, U.S.
- Cause of death: Assassination by gunshot
- Party: Kach
- Spouse: Libby Blum (m. 1956)
- Children: 4, including Binyamin
- Education: Brooklyn College (BA); New York Law School (LLB); New York University (MA)

Meir David HaKohen Kahane (/kəˈhɑːnə/ kə-HAH-nə; Hebrew: מאיר דוד הכהן כהנא; born Martin David Kahane; August 1, 1932 – November 5, 1990) was an American-born Israeli Orthodox rabbi, writer, and politician. He was the founder of the Israeli political party Kach, which promoted an ultra-nationalist ideology that continues to influence some militant and far-right political groups active today in Israel. Kahane was convicted in the United States and Israel for offenses related to terrorism.

Born in 1932 in Brooklyn, New York City, to an Orthodox Jewish family, Kahane received his education there, starting with Jewish scripture studies, and eventually gaining an M.A. in International Relations from New York University. In 1968, he founded the Jewish Defense League (JDL) in New York City, whose self-described purpose was to fight antisemitism. Several JDL members, including Kahane, were subsequently convicted of acts related to domestic terrorism, including leading the attack on the Soviet United Nations mission in 1975. Later that same year, Kahane was convicted of conspiring to kidnap a Soviet diplomat, bomb the Iraqi embassy in Washington, and ship arms abroad from Israel. He consequently served a one-year imprisonment, albeit in a hotel.

In 1971, Kahane moved to Israel and became a citizen, where he initiated protests calling for the expulsion of both Palestinian citizens of Israel and Palestinians of the Israeli-occupied territories, which led to his arrest dozens of times. In the same year, he founded Kach, a political party that initially failed to gain any seats in the Knesset. In 1980, Kahane was arrested for the 62nd time since his emigration, and he was jailed for six months for planning armed attacks against Palestinians. Kahane was held in prison in Ramla, where he wrote the book They Must Go. In the 1984 elections, his Kach party gained one seat in the Knesset, which was taken by Kahane, but he was later barred from running in 1988. In 1990, he was giving a speech to an audience of Orthodox Jews from Brooklyn, urging American Jews to emigrate to Israel, when he was assassinated by El Sayyid Nosair, an Egyptian-American national. Kahane was buried in West Jerusalem.

During his lifetime Kahane publicized his Kahanism ideology throughout the United States. In Israel, he proposed enforcing halakha (Jewish law) as codified by Maimonides and hoped that Israel would eventually adopt it as state law. While serving in the Knesset in the mid-1980s Kahane proposed numerous laws, none of which passed, to emphasize Judaism in public schools, reduce Israel's bureaucracy, forbid marriages between Jews and non-Jews, separate Jewish and Arab neighborhoods, and end cultural meetings between Jewish and Arab students. He went so far as to demand that non-Jews in Israel could not be elected, would not be allowed to live in the city of Jerusalem, and must assume specific taxes and duties or face deportation. He also popularized the slogan "For Every Jew a .22 rifle." He advocated that Jews must be "forbidden to give up any part of the Land of Israel, which has been liberated" and endorsed the annexation of the Israeli-occupied Palestinian territories of the West Bank and Gaza Strip.

== Personal life ==
Meir Kahane was born in Brooklyn, New York, to an Orthodox Jewish family. Kahane was a member of an established rabbinic family, including his father, who was head of the Flatbush Board of Rabbis. His father, Yechezkel Shragei (Charles) Kahane (1905–1978), was the rabbi of a large synagogue in Brooklyn, author of the interpretive Torah translation Torah Yesharah, and a strong supporter of the Revisionist Zionist movement. Kahane's grandfather was Nachman Kahane (1869–1937), a leading rabbinic scholar in Safed, who was the son of Baruch David Kahane (1850–1925), the author of Hibat ha-Eretz, and a disciple of Chaim Halberstam of Sanz. Baruch David immigrated to Ottoman Palestine from Poland in 1873. Kahane's father was born in Safed while his mother Sonia was born in Latvia. An uncle of Kahane's was killed in Safed during the 1929 Palestine riots.

As a teenager, Kahane became an ardent admirer of Eri Jabotinsky and Peter Bergson, who were frequent guests in his parents' home. He joined the Betar (Brit Trumpeldor) youth wing of Revisionist Zionism. He was active in protests against Ernest Bevin, the British Foreign Secretary who maintained restrictions on the emigration of Jews, even Holocaust survivors, to Palestine after the end of the Second World War. In 1949, Kahane was arrested for throwing eggs and tomatoes at Bevin, who was disembarking at Pier 90 on a visit to New York. A photo of his arrest appeared in the New York Daily News. In 1954, he became the Mazkir (Secretary) of Greater New York City's 16 Bnei Akiva chapters.

Kahane's formal education included Yeshiva of Flatbush for elementary school and Brooklyn Talmudical Academy for high school. Kahane received his rabbinical ordination from the Mir Yeshiva in Brooklyn, where he was especially admired by the head Rabbi Abraham Kalmanowitz. He was fully conversant in the Tanakh (Jewish Bible), the Talmud, the Midrash and Jewish law. Subsequently, Kahane earned a B.A. in political science from Brooklyn College in 1954, a Bachelor of Law – LL.B. from New York Law School, and an M.A. in International Relations from New York University.

In 1956, Kahane married Libby Blum, with whom he had four children: Tzipporah, Tova, Baruch, and Binyamin. Binyamin became an Orthodox Jewish scholar, rabbi, and far-right political leader aligned with Kahane's political movement, and was later killed in 2000.

In 1966, Kahane, under the alias of Michael King and while already married, had an affair and became engaged to marry the 21-year-old model Gloria Jean D'Argenio (who used the stage name Estelle Donna Evans). Kahane sent a letter to D'Argenio in which he unilaterally ended their relationship. D'Argenio was never aware of Kahane's real identity and at the time she received the letter, she had been expecting him to marry her in two days and had recently learned she was pregnant by him. Upon receiving the letter, D'Argenio jumped off the Queensboro Bridge and died of her injuries the next day. In 2008, Kahane's wife dismissed the incident as lacking proof.

After D'Argenio's death, Kahane started the Estelle Donna Evans Foundation in her name. Kahane claimed D'Argenio had been his former secretary in his failed consulting operation, had died of cancer, and that her "well-to-do" family had endowed the foundation. In reality, the money was used to fund the JDL, including supplies for bombings and Kahane's lavish travel.

== Early career ==
=== Pulpit rabbi ===
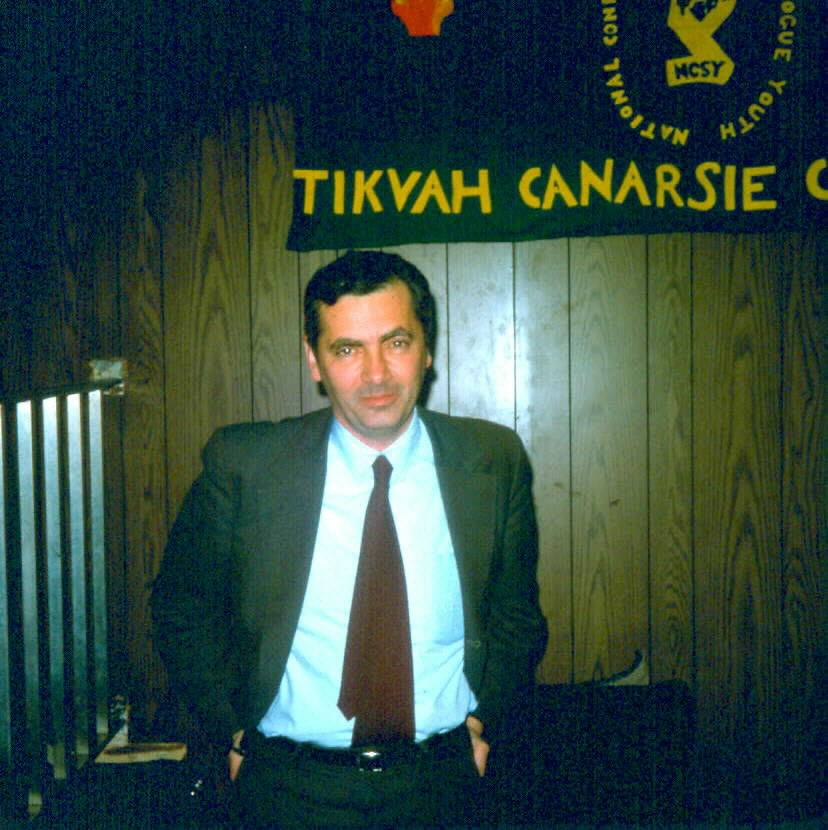
Kahane in Canarsie in 1975

In 1958, Kahane became the rabbi of the Howard Beach Jewish Center in Queens, New York City. Although the synagogue was originally Conservative, rather than strictly Orthodox, the board of directors agreed to Kahane's conditions, which included resigning from the Conservative movement's United Synagogue of America, installing a partition separating men and women during prayer, instituting traditional prayers, and maintaining a kosher kitchen. At the Jewish Center, Kahane influenced many of the synagogue's youngsters to adopt a more observant lifestyle, which often troubled parents. He trained Arlo Guthrie for his bar mitzvah. When his contract was not renewed, he soon published an article entitled "End of the Miracle of Howard Beach". That was Kahane's first article in The Jewish Press, an American Orthodox Jewish weekly for which he would continue to write for the rest of his life. Kahane also used the pen name David Sinai, and the pseudonyms Michael King, David Borac, and Martin Keene.

=== Infiltrating the John Birch Society ===
In the late 1950s and the early 1960s, Kahane's life of secrecy and his strong anticommunism landed him a position as a consultant with the FBI. According to his wife, Libby, his assignment was to infiltrate the anticommunist John Birch Society and report his findings to the FBI.

=== Collaboration with Joseph Churba ===
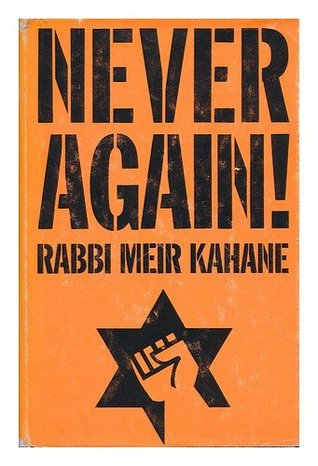
Never Again! A Program for Survival (1972)

At some time in the late 1950s, Kahane assumed the persona of a Gentile, along with the pseudonym Michael King. Kahane began openly expressing his anticommunism. He and Joseph Churba created the July Fourth Movement, which was formed to counteract widespread opposition towards U.S. involvement in the Vietnam War. Subsequently, they coauthored the book The Jewish Stake in Vietnam, an attempt to convince American Jews of the "evil of Communism". The introduction states that, "All Americans have a stake in this grim war against Communism... It is vital that Jews realize the threat to their very survival [should Communism succeed]." Churba had a major falling out with Kahane over the use of paramilitary activities, and they parted ways permanently. Churba went on to pursue his own career, joining the U.S. Air Force, writing many books on the Middle East, and eventually becoming one of Ronald Reagan's consultants. Kahane chose to fight for Jewish rights, and was willing to use extreme measures. He even attempted to acquire and grow biological weapons to use on a Soviet military installation. He began using the phrase "Never again" and conceived the Jewish Star and fist insignia, a symbol resembling that of the Black Panther Party. However, Kahane himself opposed the Black Panthers, claiming they had supported anti-Jewish riots in Massachusetts and had left-wing views.

== Jewish Defense League ==
Kahane founded the Jewish Defense League (JDL) in New York City in 1968. Its self-described purpose was to protect Jews from local manifestations of antisemitism. Kahane encouraged Jews to take up firearms, through his slogan "every Jew a .22".

Kahane's wife Libby stated that the JDL favored "civil rights for blacks, but opposed black antisemites" and Kahane himself stated that the JDL was "not against any race, creed, or color. We are against anyone who is against the Jews." In 1971, the JDL formed an alliance with a black rights group in what Kahane termed "a turning point in Black–Jewish relations". The Anti-Defamation League claimed that Kahane "preached a radical form of Jewish nationalism which reflected racism, violence and political extremism" that was replicated by Irv Rubin, the JDL's successor to Kahane.

== Terrorism and convictions ==
A number of the JDL's members and leaders, including Kahane, were convicted of acts related to domestic terrorism. In 1971, Kahane was sentenced to a suspended five-year prison sentence and fined $5,000 for conspiring to manufacture explosives. In 1975, Kahane was arrested for leading the attack on the Soviet United Nations mission and injuring two officers, but he was released after being given summonses for disorderly conduct. Later the same year, Kahane was accused of conspiring to kidnap a Soviet diplomat, bomb the Iraqi embassy in Washington, and ship arms abroad from Israel. He was convicted of violating his probation for the 1971 bombing conviction and was sentenced to one year in prison. He served most of it in a hotel, with frequent unsupervised absences, because of a concession over the provision of kosher food.

In a 1984 interview with Washington Post correspondent Carla Hall, Kahane admitted that the Jewish Defense League "bombed the Russian [Soviet] mission in New York, the Russian cultural mission here [Washington] in 1971, the Soviet trade offices". He said: “All of the Jewish Defense League violence was not useless or heedless violence. It was a lesson in political logic. We knew that if a detente [with the Soviet Union] was achieved, Soviet Jews were doomed. Our only leverage was to prevent a detente.”

== Emigration to Israel ==
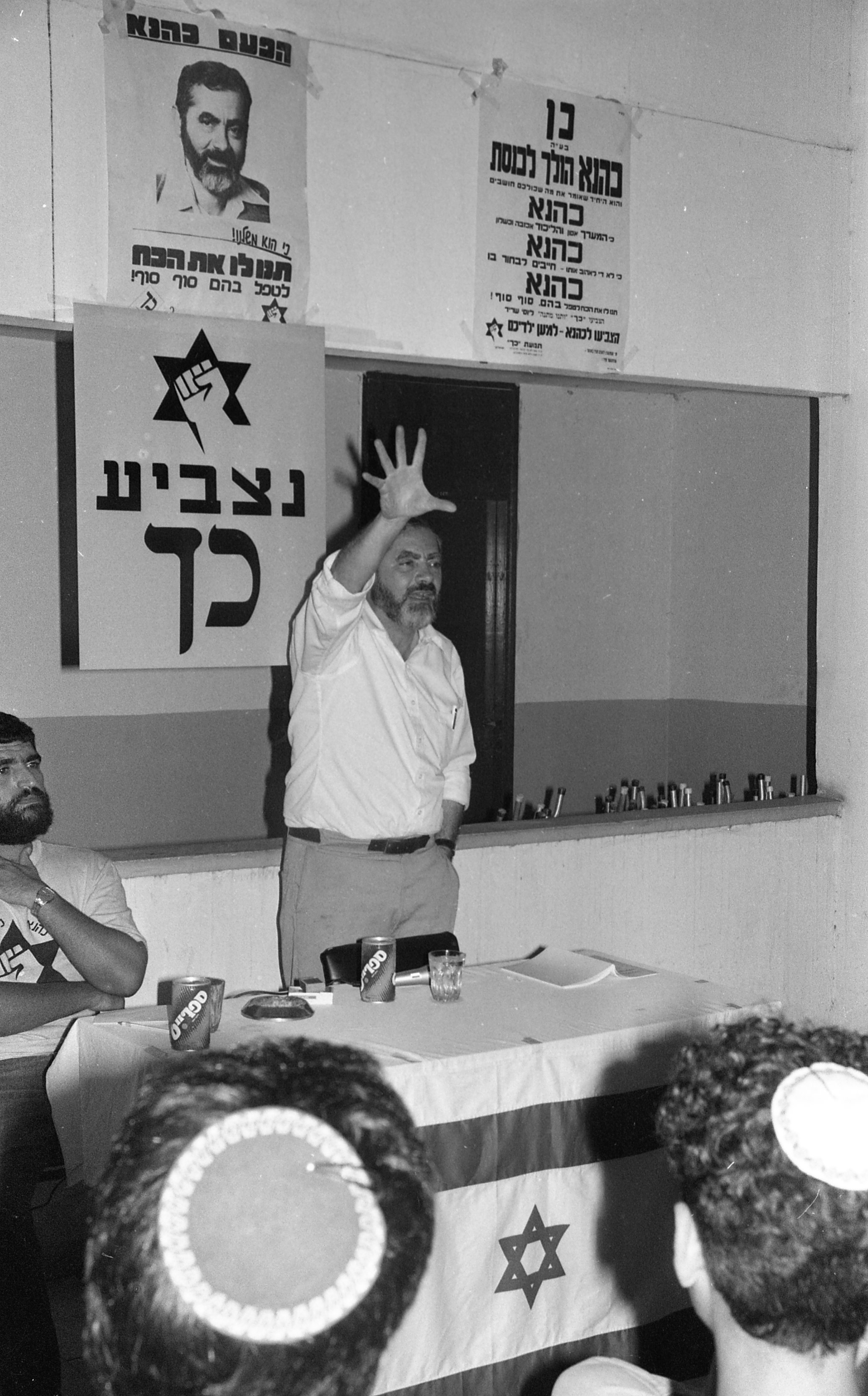
Kahane addressing his followers at the Tel Aviv offices of the Kach Israeli political party he established, 1984

In September 1971, Kahane moved to Israel. At the time, he declared that he would focus on Jewish education. He later began gathering lists of Palestinian citizens of Israel who were willing to emigrate for compensation and later led protests that advocated their expulsion, and that of the Palestinians of the Israeli-occupied territories. Kahane was arrested dozens of times by Israeli law enforcement. In 1980, Kahane was arrested for the 62nd time since his emigration, and he was jailed for six months after a detention order that was based on allegations of him planning armed attacks against Palestinians in response to the killings of Jewish settlers. Kahane was held in prison in Ramla, where he wrote the book They Must Go. Kahane was banned from entering the UK in 1981.

== Political career ==
In 1971, he founded the Kach political party, which ran in the 1973 general elections under the name "The League List". It won 12,811 votes (0.82%), just 2,857 (0.18%) short of the electoral threshold at the time (1%) for winning a Knesset seat. The party was less successful in the 1977 elections, winning only 4,836 votes.

Kach stood in the 1981 elections, but did not win a seat and received only 5,128 votes. In 1984, the Israeli Central Elections Committee banned Kahane from being a candidate on the grounds that Kach was a racist party. However, the Supreme Court of Israel overturned the ban on the grounds that the committee was not authorized to ban Kahane's candidacy. The Supreme Court suggested that the Knesset pass a law excluding racist parties from future elections. The Knesset responded in 1985 by amending the "Basic Law: Knesset" to include a prohibition (paragraph 7a) against the registration of parties that explicitly or implicitly incite racism.

=== Knesset ===
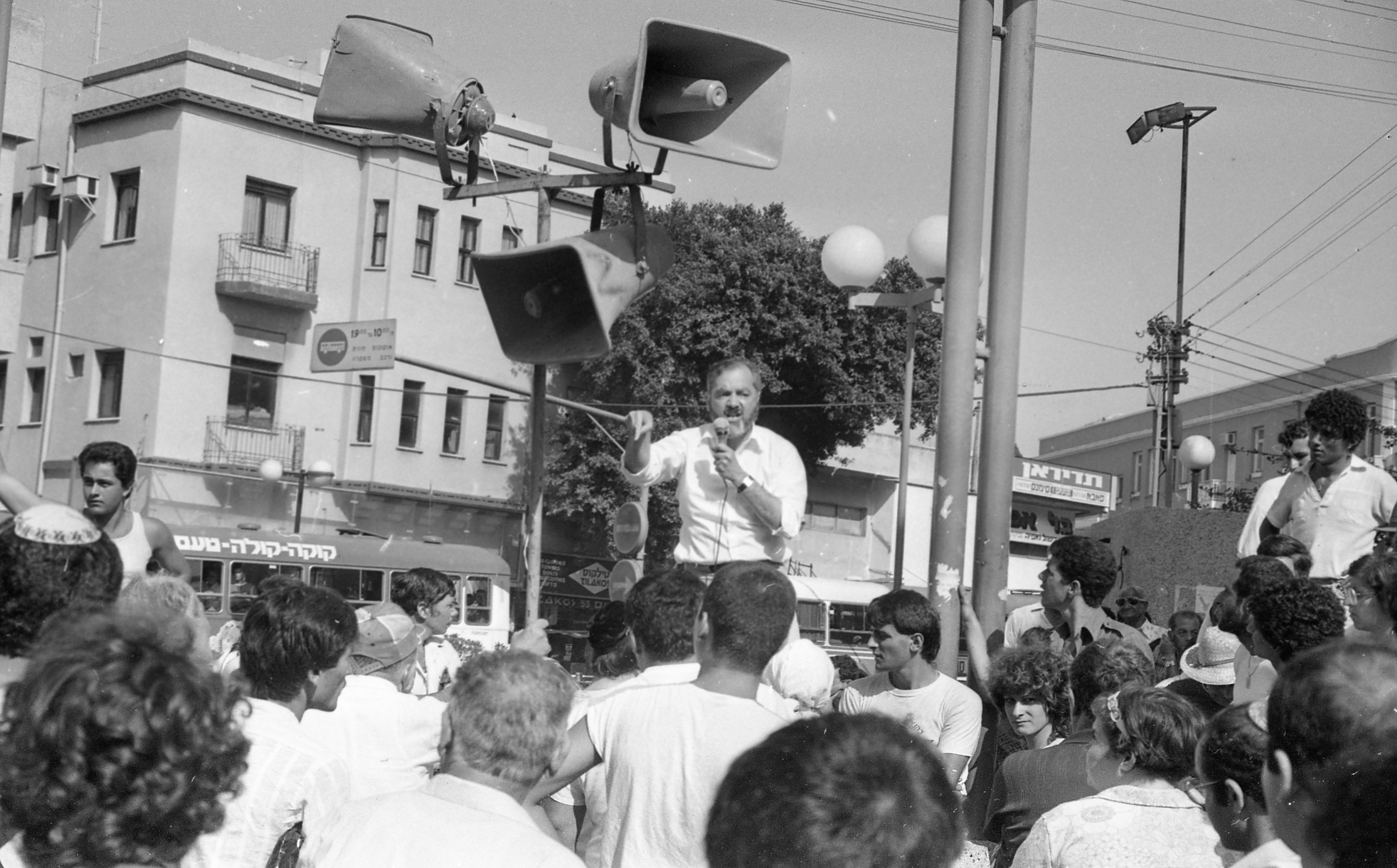
Kahane addressing his followers in Tel Aviv, 1984

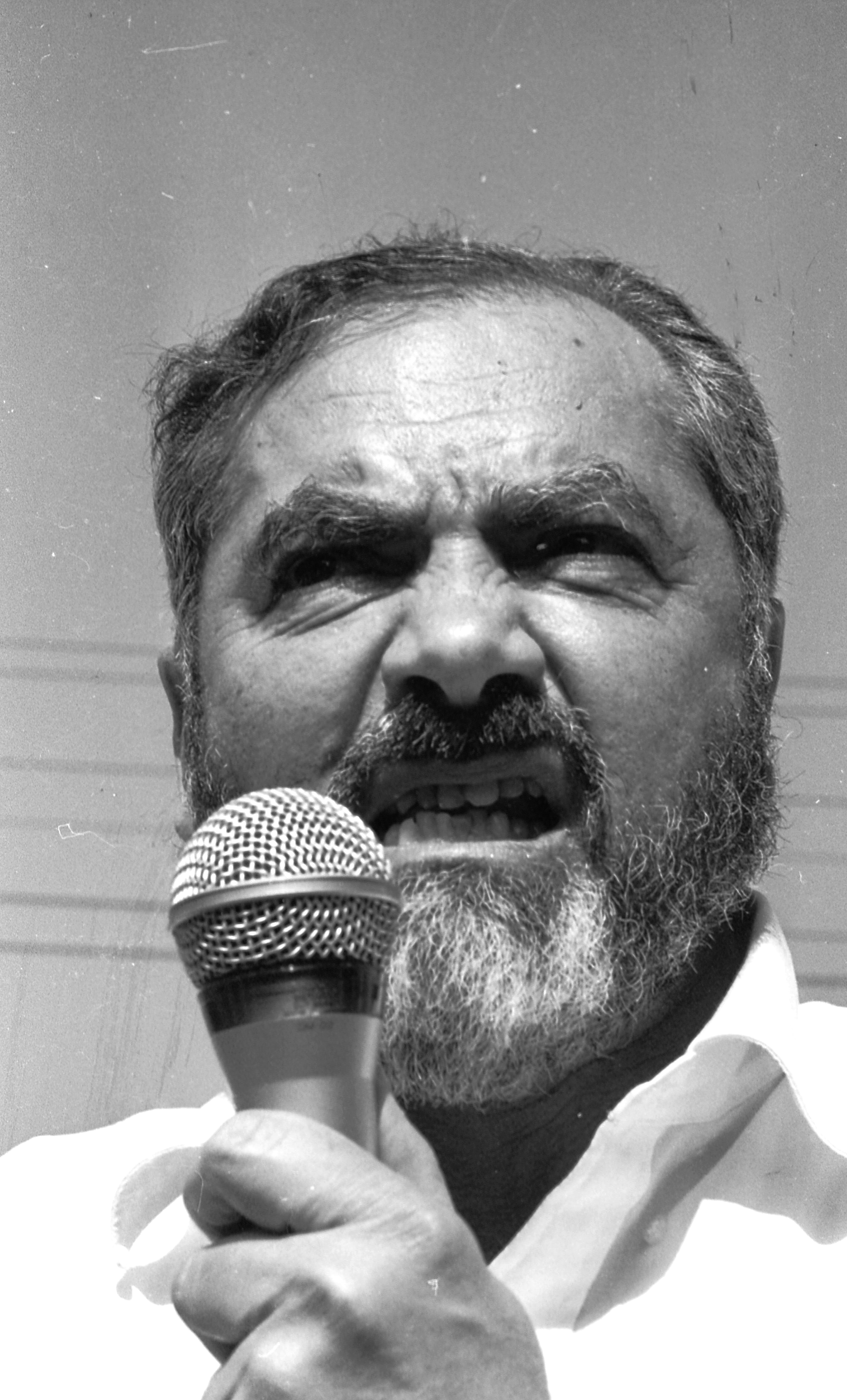
Kahane addressing his followers in Tel Aviv, 1984

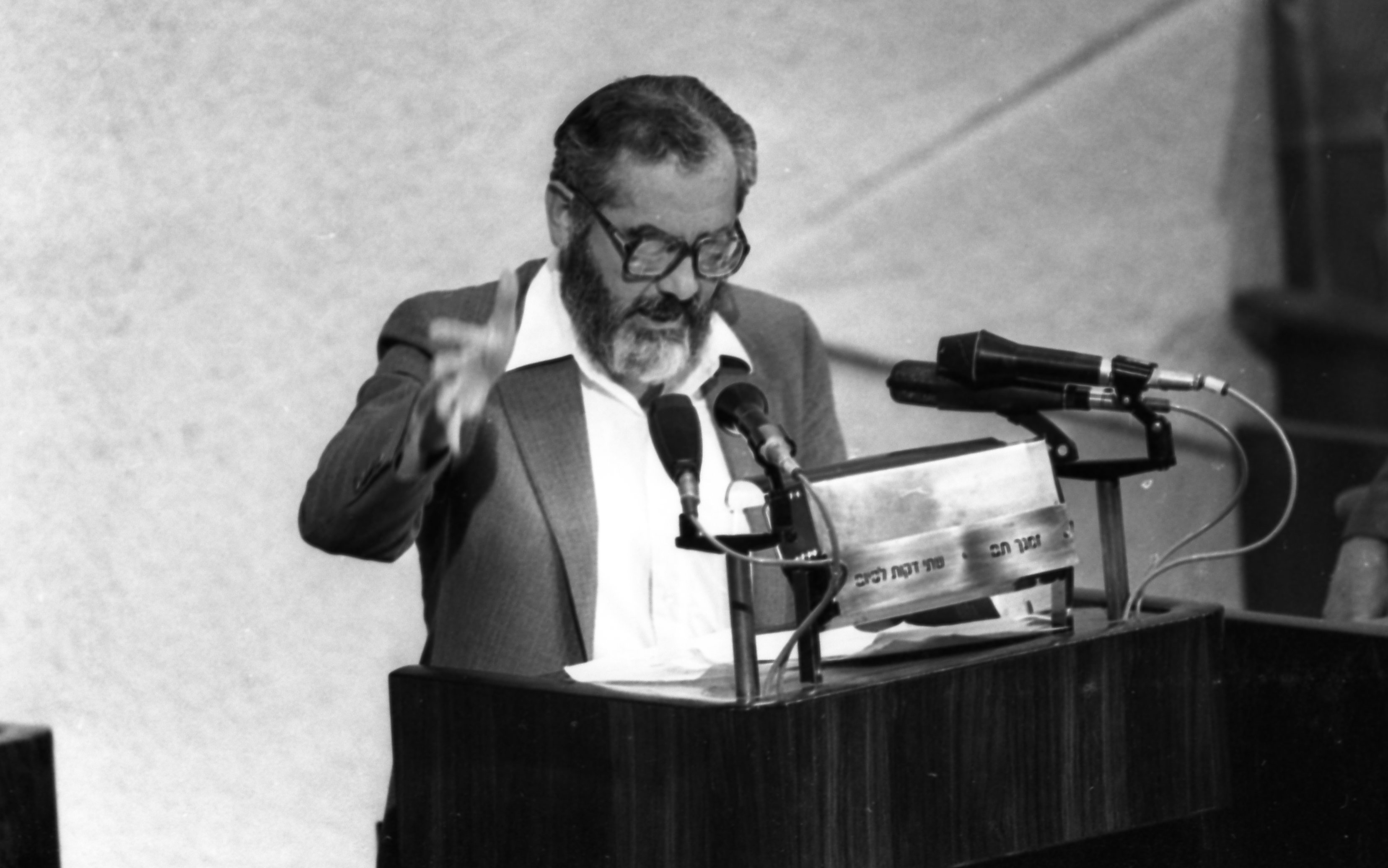
Kahane addressing the Knesset while he was a member of the Israeli parliament, 1985

In the 1984 legislative elections, Kahane's Kach party received 25,907 votes (1.2%), gaining one seat in the Knesset, which was taken by Kahane. He refused to take the standard oath of office and insisted on adding a Biblical verse from Psalms to indicate that national laws were overruled by the Torah if they conflict. Kahane's legislative proposals focused on Jewish education, an open economy, transferring the Arab population out of the Land of Israel, revoking Israeli citizenship from non-Jews, and banning Jewish-Gentile marriages and sexual relations.

While his popularity in Israel grew, Kahane was boycotted in the Knesset, where his speeches were often made to an empty assembly except for the duty chairman and the transcriptionist. The Knesset revoked his Parliamentary immunity to prevent his freedom of movement in areas where his inflammatory rhetoric could cause harm. Kahane's legislative proposals and motions of no-confidence against the government were ignored or rejected. Kahane often pejoratively called other Knesset members "Hellenists," a reference to Jews who assimilated into Greek culture after Judea's occupation by Alexander the Great.

In 1987, Kahane opened a yeshiva ("HaRaayon HaYehudi") with funding from US supporters to teach "the Authentic Jewish Idea". Despite the boycott, his popularity grew among the Israeli public, especially for working-class Sephardi Jews. Polls showed that Kach would have likely received anywhere from four to twelve seats in the coming November 1988 elections.

In 1985, the Knesset passed an amendment to the Basic Law of Israel, barring political parties that incited to racism. The Central Elections Committee banned Kahane a second time, and he appealed to the Israeli Supreme Court. However, the Supreme Court this time ruled in favor of the committee, disqualifying Kach from running in the 1988 legislative elections. (Note: Shaul Magid, Meir Kahane: The Public Life and Political Thought of an American Jewish Radical (2021). Quote: Israeli legislators took the drastic action of amending the country’s Basic Laws to bar “racist parties and candidates” from running in Israeli elections. Known as article 7a of the Basic Laws, this amendment rendered KACH illegal, and Kahane and his party were removed from the Knesset.) Kahane was thus the first candidate in Israel to be barred from election for racism. Shaul Magid wrote in 2021 that "This law was clearly legislated for Kahane and KACH alone; it was never successfully invoked again." The law was criticized as being anti-democratic by the well-known lawyer and professor Alan Dershowitz.

After Kahane's election to the Knesset in 1984, the United States government attempted to revoke his U.S. citizenship, an action which Kahane successfully challenged in court. However, in 1987, the Knesset passed a law declaring that a Knesset member could only be an Israeli citizen. To remain eligible for office, Kahane renounced his United States citizenship, but after being banned from the Knesset for his politics, he again filed suit to get his U.S. citizenship reinstated based on the argument that he was compelled to relinquish it by the Knesset. The court rejected this argument, but he was permitted to continue traveling to the United States.

== Assassination ==
In November 1990, Kahane gave a speech to an audience of mostly Orthodox Jews from Brooklyn, in which he warned American Jews to emigrate to Israel before it was "too late". As a crowd gathered around Kahane in the second-floor lecture hall in Midtown Manhattan's New York Marriott East Side, Kahane was assassinated by El Sayyid Nosair, an Egyptian-born U.S. citizen. He was initially charged and acquitted of the murder. Nosair was later convicted of the murder in a U.S. district court for his involvement in the 1993 World Trade Center bombing. Prosecutors were able to try Nosair again for the murder because the federal indictment included the killing as part of the alleged terrorist conspiracy. He was sentenced to life imprisonment and later made a confession to federal agents.

Kahane was buried on Har HaMenuchot, in Jerusalem. He was eulogized by supporters in both the U.S. and in Israel, including Rabbi Moshe Tendler and the Sephardic Chief Rabbi of Israel, Mordechai Eliyahu, who spoke of how little the people understood of Kahane's true value.

A few hours after news of the assassination of Kahane reached Israel, two elderly Palestinians, Mohammed Ali (73) and Mariam Suleiman Hassan (71), were gunned down in an incident ascribed to Kach militants. Noam Federman was quoted as saying that the slayings had been committed as revenge by Kahane supporters, and that more violence was in the pipeline.

== Ideology ==
Kahane argued that there was a glory in Jewish destiny, which came through the observance of the Torah and halakha (Jewish law). He observed, "Democracy and Judaism are not the same thing." Kahane was of the view a Jewish state and a Western democracy were incompatible, since Western democracy is religion-blind, and a Jewish state is religion-oriented by its very name. He feared non-Jewish citizens becoming a majority and voting against the Jewish character of the state: "The question is as follows: if the Arabs settle among us and make enough children to become a majority, will Israel continue to be a Jewish state? Do we have to accept that the Arab majority will decide?" He also said that "you cannot have Zionism and democracy at the same ... Western democracy has to be ruled out. For me, that's cut and dried: There's no question of setting up democracy in Israel, because democracy means equal rights for all, irrespective of racial or religious origins."

Kahane proposed an "exchange of populations" that would continue the Jewish exodus from Arab lands: "A total of some 750,000 Jews fled Arab lands since 1948. Surely it is time for Jews, worried over the huge growth of Arabs in Israel, to consider finishing the exchange of populations that began 35 years ago." Kahane proposed a $40,000 compensation plan for Arabs who would leave voluntarily, and forcible expulsion for those who "don't want to leave". He encouraged retaliatory violence against Arabs who attacked Jews: "I approve of anybody who commits such acts of violence. Really, I don't think that we can sit back and watch Arabs throwing rocks at buses whenever they feel like it. They must understand that a bomb thrown at a Jewish bus is going to mean a bomb thrown at an Arab bus."

In some of his writings, Kahane argued that Israel should never start a war for territory but that if a war were launched against Israel, Biblical territory should be annexed. However, in an interview, he defined Israel's "minimal borders" as follows: "The southern boundary goes up to El Arish, which takes in all of northern Sinai, including Yamit. To the east, the frontier runs along the western part of the East Bank of the Jordan River, hence part of what is now Jordan. Eretz Yisrael also includes part of Lebanon and certain parts of Syria, and part of Iraq, all the way to the Euphrates River." When critics suggested that following Kahane's plans would mean a perpetual war between Jews and Arabs, Kahane responded, "There will be a perpetual war. With or without Kahane."

== Support ==
- Shlomo Aviner stated that Kahane was a righteous man who displayed self-sacrifice for the Jewish nation and also referred to him as a "Torah hero" whose every word was rooted in Torah sources.
- Herbert Bomzer referred to Kahane as "truly immersed in Torah all the time."
- Irving Bunim was a strong supporter and admirer of Kahane.
- Shlomo Carlebach and Kahane organized one of the first Noahide conferences in the 1980s for non-Jews wishing to accept the Noahide laws.
- Bob Dylan made positive comments about Kahane. In a 1971 interview for Time magazine, Dylan said, "He's a really sincere guy. He's really put it all together." According to Kahane, Dylan attended several meetings of the Jewish Defense League to find out "what we're all about", and he started to have talks with the rabbi. Subsequently, Dylan downplayed the extent of his contact with Kahane.
- Mordechai Eliyahu was one of Kahane's staunchest supporters. He wrote a glowing approbation to one of Kahane's books, and eulogized him at his funeral in messianic terms.
- Zvi Yehuda Kook endorsed Kahane in his bid for a Knesset seat. In his letter of support for Kahane, Kook stated, "The presence of Rabbi Meir Kahane and his uncompromising words from the Knesset platform will undoubtedly add strength and value to the obligatory struggle on behalf of the entire Land of Israel."
- Yosef Mendelevitch said "Kahane was a representative for us. His activities made us feel good. His actions showed that Jews cared. His actions may have been controversial, but his role was very important. He was a symbol for Russian Jews."
- Aaron Rakeffet-Rothkoff said, "You can't imagine the influence Kahane had on so many young people. Kahane was a talmid chacham (Torah scholar) that we all looked up to."
- Menachem Mendel Schneerson supported Kahane on many issues concerning Israel, including the issue of Arabs, relinquishing land, building settlements and the incorporation of Jewish law into Israeli policy. After hearing of Kahane's death, Schneerson remarked that "one of the greatest Jewish leaders in history has fallen." He later blessed Kahane's son to be successful in fulfilling his "holy father's" work.
- Avraham Shapira stated that Kahane was an inseparable part of Orthodox Judaism. He later openly backed Kahane's State of Judea movement.
- After the Kach party was outlawed, a member of the Sicarii terrorist group pledged allegiance to Kahane and his political party during a phone call.
- Ahron Soloveichik stated, "What Kahane said was absolutely correct, just we don't say it because the world will criticize us, but somebody had to say it."
- Ya'akov Yosef described Kahane as one who fulfilled his role faithfully. He declared that "we must learn from his great actions in order that we learn the way of the Torah."

== Legacy ==
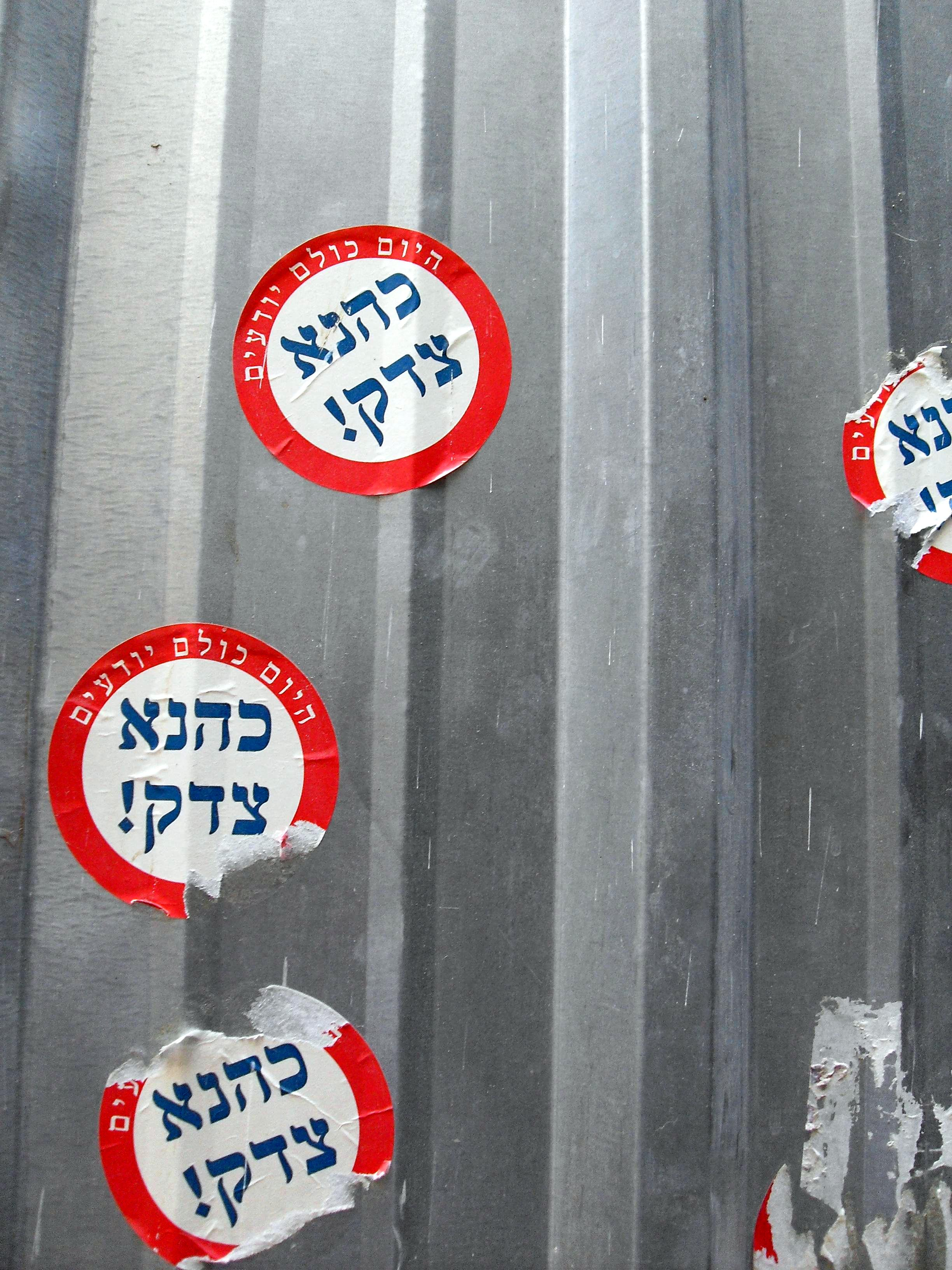
Stickers in Hebrew: "Today everybody knows: Kahane was right" in the Old City of Jerusalem, part of the Israeli-occupied West Bank

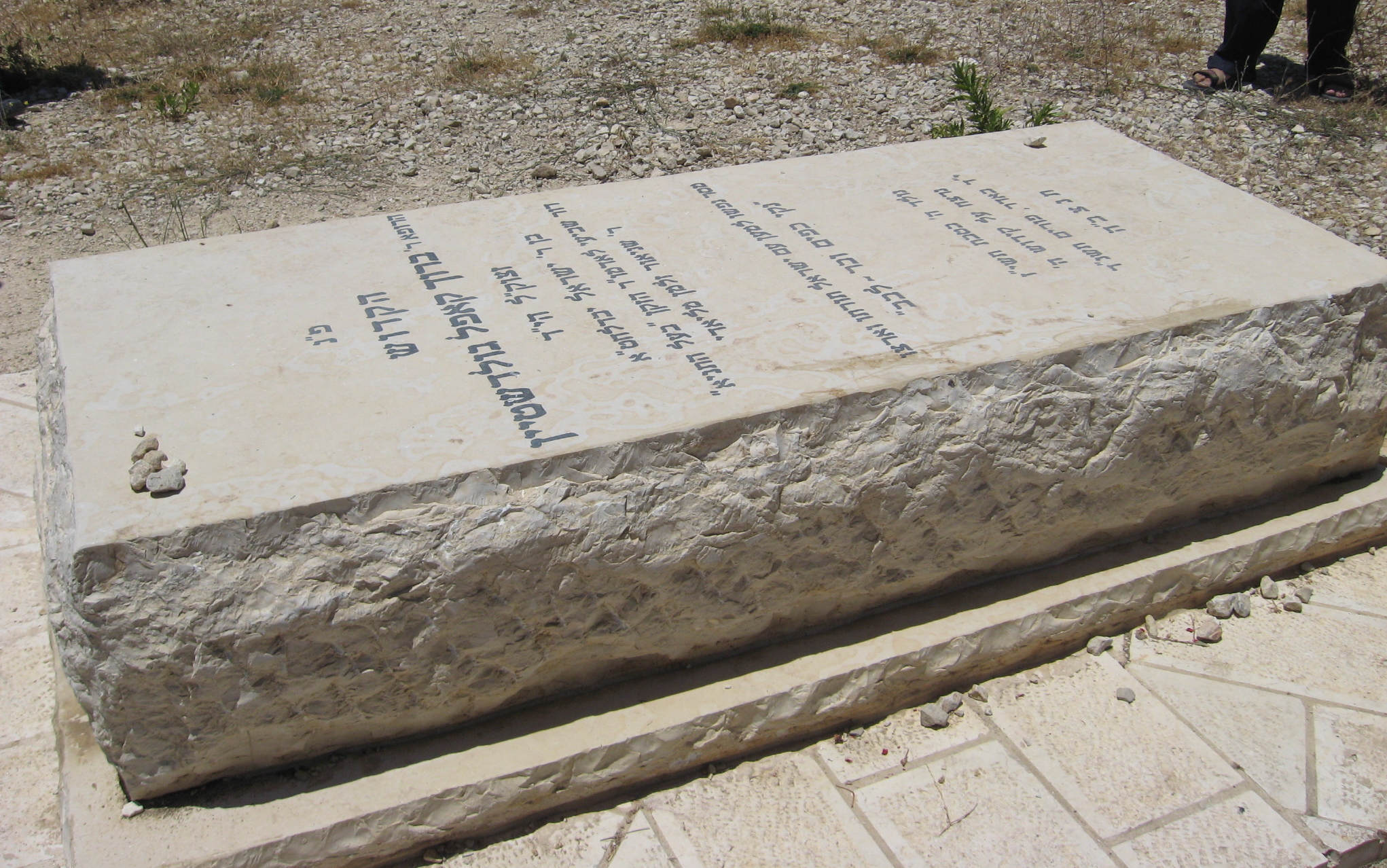
Tomb of Baruch Goldstein, a supporter of Kach and perpetrator of the 1994 Cave of the Patriarchs massacre against Palestinian worshippers, located at the Meir Kahane Park in the Israeli settlement of Kiryat Arba in the West Bank

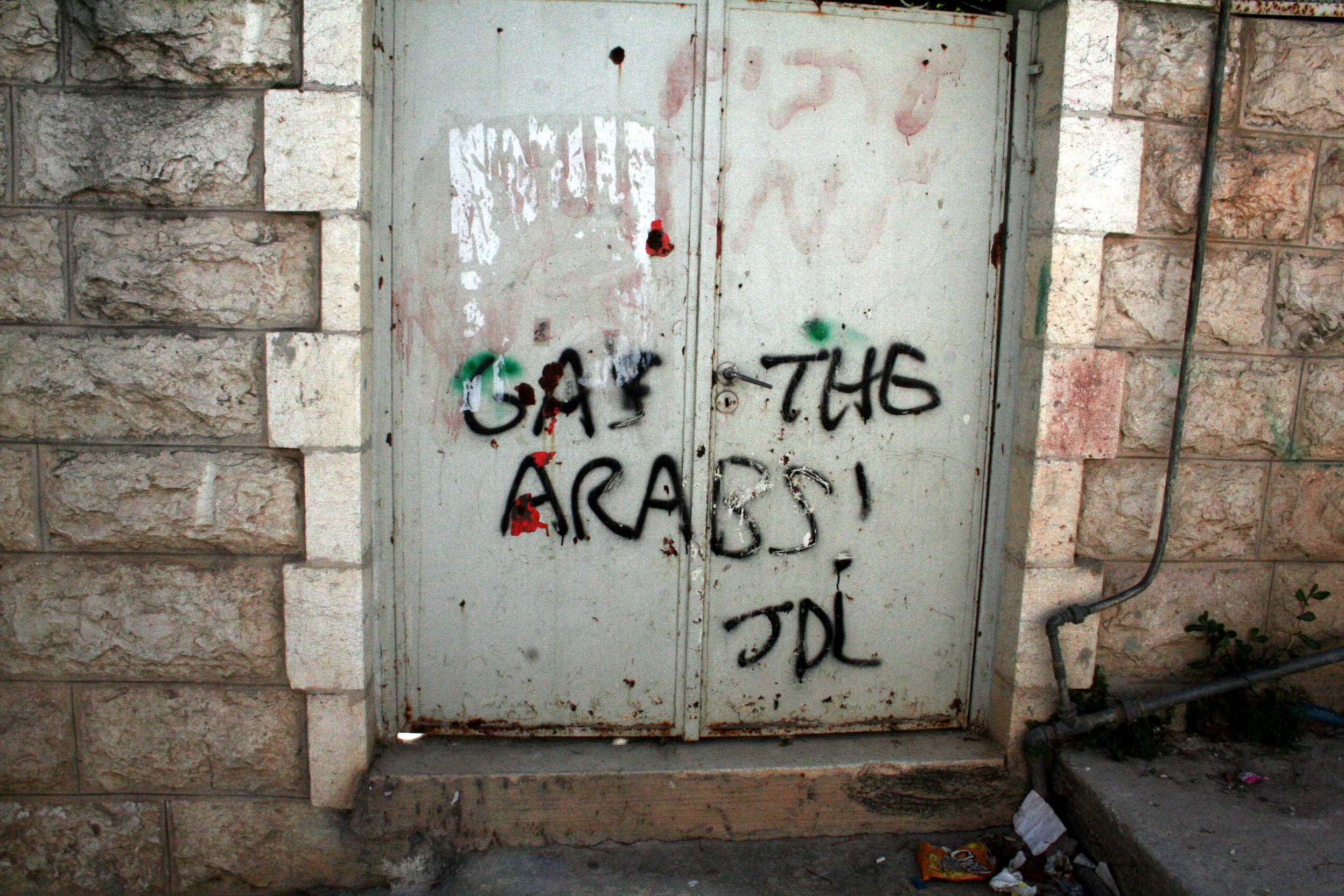
Graffiti in Hebron in the West Bank, calling for the gassing of Arabs, above a tag for the Jewish Defense League. The persistent graffiti in Hebron that calls for the expulsion or killing of Arabs has been characterized as Kahane's legacy.

The prosecution argued that Arab MK Haneen Zoabi should be banned for denying the Jewish people's existence, and she was banned by the Central Elections Committee, which uses the Kahane precedent. A week later, the ruling was unanimously overturned by the Supreme Court. Attempts to ban the Strong Israel and Balad political parties by using the Kahane precedent were also overturned.

Following Kahane's death, no leader emerged to replace him in the movement. However, the idea of transferring populations, attributed mainly to Kahane, was subsequently incorporated into the political platform of several parties in Israel, such as Moledet (applying to Arab non-citizen residents of the West Bank) and Yisrael Beiteinu (in the form of population exchange). Two small Kahanist factions later emerged; one under the name Kach, and the other under the name Kahane Chai (Hebrew: כהנא חי, literally "Kahane lives [on]"), the second one being led by his younger son, Binyamin Ze'ev Kahane. Neither one was permitted to participate in the Knesset elections by the Central Elections Committee.

In 1994, following the Cave of the Patriarchs massacre that saw Kach supporter Baruch Goldstein indiscriminately kill 29 Palestinian Muslim worshippers in Hebron, the Israeli government declared both parties to be terrorist organizations. The US State Department also added Kach and Kahane Chai to its list of Foreign Terrorist Organizations.

In the 2003 Knesset elections, Herut, which had split off from the National Union list, ran with Michael Kleiner and former Kach activist Baruch Marzel taking the top two spots on the list. The joint effort narrowly missed the 1.5% barrier. In the following 2006 elections, the Jewish National Front, led by Baruch Marzel, fared better, but it also failed to pass the minimum threshold. A follower of Kahane who was involved with Kach for many years, Michael Ben-Ari, was elected to the Knesset in the 2009 elections on renewed National Union list. He stood again in the 2013 elections as the second candidate on the list of Otzma LeYisrael, but the party failed to pass the minimum threshold.

In 2007, the FBI released over a thousand documents relating to its daily surveillance of Kahane from the early 1960s.

In 2015, Kahane's grandson, Meir Ettinger, was detained by Israeli law enforcement. He was the alleged leader of the radical Jewish group "The Revolt". In an online "manifesto" echoing some of his grandfather's teachings, Ettinger promotes the "dispossession of gentiles" who live in Israel and the establishment of a new "kingdom of Israel", a theocracy ruled according to the Halacha. Ettinger's writings condemned Israel's government, mainstream rabbis, and the IDF, and also have denounced Christian churches as "idolatry".

Libby Kahane, his widow, published the first volume of a biography Rabbi Meir Kahane: His Life and Thought Vol. One: 1932–1975 around 2008. A contributor to Haaretz said the book "lacks serious analysis", "ignores important unflattering details" and "serves as an apologetic". In 2016, Libby Kahane claimed that modern Jewish extremists in Israel do not follow the ideology of her late husband. She justified that claim by arguing that, unlike modern Jewish extremists, Rabbi Kahane had a more mature approach that did not encourage illegal activities.

In 2017, The Forward reported that some of Kahane's followers were aligning themselves with white nationalists and the alt-right. Other Kahanists declared that such moves did not reflect Kahane's teachings, and they supported that declaration by arguing that Kahane worked together with African Americans.

== Publications ==
- (Partially under pseudonym Michael King; with Joseph Churba) The Jewish Stake in Vietnam, Crossroads, 1967
- Never Again! A Program for Survival, Pyramid Books, 1972
- Time to Go Home, Nash, 1972.
- Letters from Prison, Jewish Identity Center, 1974
- Our Challenge: The Chosen Land, 1974
- The Story of the Jewish Defense League, Chilton, 1975, 2nd edition, Institute for Publication of the Writings of Rabbi Meir Kahane, (Brooklyn, NY), 2000
- Why Be Jewish? Intermarriage, Assimilation, and Alienation, Stein & Day, 1977
- Listen, Vanessa, I Am a Zionist, Institute of the Authentic Jewish Idea, 1978
- They Must Go, Grosset & Dunlop, 1981
- Forty Years, Institute of the Jewish Idea, 2nd edition, 1983
- Uncomfortable Questions for Comfortable Jews, Lyle Stuart, 1987
- Israel: Revolution or Referendum, Barricade Books (Secaucus, NJ), 1990
- Or ha-ra'yon, English title: The Jewish Idea, n.p. (Jerusalem), 1992, translated from the Hebrew by Raphael Blumberg, Institute for Publication of the Writings of Rabbi Meir Kahane (Jerusalem), 1996
- On Jews and Judaism: Selected Articles 1961–1990, Institute for Publication of the Writings of Rabbi Meir Kahane (Jerusalem), 1993
- Perush ha-Makabi: al Sefer Devarim, Institute for Publication of the Writings of Rabbi Meir Kahane (Jerusalem), 1993, 1995
- Pirush HaMaccabee: al Sefer Shemu'el u-Nevi'im rishonim, Institute for Publication of the Writings of Rabbi Meir Kahane (Jerusalem), 1994
- Listen World, Listen Jew, 3rd edition, Institute for the Publication of the Writings of Rabbi Meir Kahane (Jerusalem), 1995
- Beyond Words, 1st edition, Institute for the Publication of the Writings of Rabbi Meir Kahane (Jerusalem), 2010.
- Kohen ve-navi: osef ma'amarim, ha-Makhon le-hotsa'at kitve ha-Rav Kahana (Jerusalem), 2000
- Cuckooland, illustrated by Shulamith bar Itzhak (yet unpublished).

== See also ==
- Jewish fundamentalism
- Politics of Israel
- Zionist political violence
