= Fatigue (album) =

Studio album by L'Rain
- Released: June 25, 2021
- Recorded: 2018–2019
- Studios: Black Lodge Recording (Brooklyn); The Honey Jar (Brooklyn); Hook & Fade Studios; Sunset Sound Recorders (Los Angeles)
- Genres: Experimental pop; neo-psychedelia
- Length: 29:55
- Label: Mexican Summer
- Producers: Taja Cheek; Andrew Lappin

L'Rain chronology
L'Rain (2017)	Fatigue (2021)	I Killed Your Dog (2023)

Fatigue is the second record by Brooklyn-based experimental musician Taja Cheek, under the moniker of L'Rain. It is her first recording with record label Mexican Summer. Fatigue builds on Cheek's experimental compositional approach, drawing from an eclectic collection of genres and employing field recording elements. Instrumentally, it has help from twenty collaborators, who lend the record clavinet, saxophone, and more.

Upon its release, Fatigue was greeted with rave reviews. It was named the best album of the year by British magazine The Wire.

== Background ==
Taja Cheek planned on naming her second record Suck Teeth because she "loved how it encapsulated a very black sound of disapproval, annoyance, and disappointment."

== Composition ==
Fatigue has musical footing in experimental pop, as well as orchestral pop. However, the record contains diverse songs that bend genre. Ambient music, gospel, jazz, post-punk, neo soul, R&B, shoegazing, soft rock and sound collage have all been melded into L'Rain's own aesthetic.

Fatigue makes significant use of field recordings. The latter half of "Find It" samples a pastor singing at a funeral Cheek attended. "Black Clap" has sounds from a hand game she created alongside co-producer and multi-instrumentalist Ben Chapoteau-Katz. About it, she said that "in the studio, I was thinking about ways that play can improve your life, and I was like, 'I'll just make up a hand game, because that's something I used to do when I was a kid.'"

It is also shaded in psychedelia, with its songs working in neo-psychedelia. Psychedelic musicians like Syd Barrett and quartet Animal Collective have been noted as spiritual touchstones for L'Rain's music. L'Rain has cited the latter's early recordings as informative to her.

The second song, "Find It", digs into "warped, genre-mashing" pop-soul and "sweet, distorted" shoegaze pop. Experimentation continues even when songs dip into conventional pop and dance sounds, like on "Kill Self" and "Two Face". The latter song's R&B yields a "heady cacophony".

== Critical reception ==
Professional ratings
Aggregate scores
Source	Rating
AnyDecentMusic?	7.2/10
Metacritic	86/100
Review scores
Source	Rating
AllMusic	4.5/5 stars
Beats Per Minute	65%
The Line of Best Fit	8/10
Paste	8.7/10
Pitchfork	8.5/10
Spectrum Culture	72%

Fatigue was welcomed with critical applause upon its release. On Metacritic, the record holds a score of 86 out of 100, based on seven reviews, indicating "universal acclaim".

Paul Simpson for AllMusic applauded the record, seeing it as "even bolder and dreamier than [her] self-titled debut" and "a uniquely powerful expression of her uncompromising vision." Aymeric Dubois for The Line of Best Fit called it "reflective and exposing...a transformative listen".

=== Accolades ===
==== Semester-end lists ====
Accolades for Fatigue
Country	Publication	Work	List	Rank	Ref.
US	Bandcamp Daily	Fatigue	The Best Albums of Spring 2021	--	
US	Paste	Fatigue	The 10 Best Albums of June 2021	--	
US	Paste	"Suck Teeth"	The 15 Best Songs of June 2021	--	
UK	The Quietus	Fatigue	The Quietus Albums Of The Year So Far Chart 2021	31	

==== Year-end lists ====
Country	Publication	Work	List	Rank	Ref.
US	AllMusic	Fatigue	AllMusic Best of 2021	—	
US	Bandcamp Daily	Fatigue	Best of 2021: The Year's Essential Releases	—	
UK	Crack Magazine	Fatigue	The Top 50 Albums of the Year	20	
UK	Our Culture	Fatigue	The 50 Best Albums of 2021	10	
US	Paste	Fatigue	The 50 Best Albums of 2021	38	
US	Pitchfork	Fatigue	The 50 Best Albums of 2021	2	
US	Pitchfork	Fatigue	The Best Jazz and Experimental Music of 2021	—	
US	Pitchfork	"Find It"	The 100 Best Songs of 2021	26	
UK	The Quietus	Fatigue	Quietus Albums Of The Year 2021	15	
UK	Rough Trade	Fatigue	US Albums of The Year 2021	9	
US	Treble	Fatigue	The 50 Best Albums of 2021	46	
US	Treble	"Two Face"	The 100 Best Songs of 2021	13	
UK	The Wire	Fatigue	Rewind: Top 50 Releases of 2021	1	

== Track listing ==
All tracks are written by Taja Cheek.

No.	Title	Length
1.	"Fly, Die"	2:00
2.	"Find It"	6:17
3.	"Round Sun"	0:21
4.	"Blame Me"	3:31
5.	"Black Clap"	0:26
6.	"Suck Teeth"	3:56
7.	"Love Her"	0:17
8.	"Kill Self"	1:51
9.	"Not Now"	0:10
10.	"Two Face"	4:06
11.	"Walk Through"	0:17
12.	"I V"	2:25
13.	"Need Be"	1:01
14.	"Take Two"	3:09
Total length:		29:55

== Personnel ==
Adapted from the record's Bandcamp page.

L'Rain
- Taja Cheek – vocals, air horn, bass, guitar, keyboards, percussion, piano, programming, samples, synthesizers (all songs)

Additional musicians

- Jon Bap – background vocals (4)
- Quinton Brock – monologue and vocal performance (1, 10)
- E.T. Cali – radio announcer (10)
- Ben Chapoteau-Katz – air horn (1), saxophone (2, 4, 6, 8, 10, 12, 14), percussion (2, 6), synth (2, 8, 14), vocals (10)
- Tiger Darrow – cello (2)
- Buz Donald – drums and percussion (2, 6)
- Alex Goldberg – drums and percussion (1, 10, 12)
- Travis Haynes – organ and vocals (2)
- Carlos Hernandez – assistant engineer (2, 10)
- Devin Hobdy – background vocals (2)
- Andrew Lappin – programming (2, 12), guitar (6, 8)
- Alita Moses – background vocals (2, 12)
- Taj Sapp – background vocals (2, 12)
- Jake Sherman – organ and clavinet (2, 6)
- Mike Stephenson – background vocals (2, 12)
- Abby Swidler – viola (2)
- Zosha Warpeha – violin (2)
- Anna Wise – background vocals (4)
- Gabriel Zucker – string arrangement (2)

Technical

- Taja Cheek – production
- Jake Aron – mixing
- Ben Chapoteau-Katz – co-production
- Heba Kadry – mastering
- Andrew Lappin – engineering, executive production, mixing, production
- Slauson Malone – additional production, sequencing

Artwork and design

- Jason Omar Al-Taan – front cover photograph
- Bailey Elder – design, layout
