= RaFia Santana =

American artist and musician

- Born: 1990 (age 35–36); Brooklyn, NY
- Education: SUNY Purchase College
- Alma mater: SUNY Purchase College
- Known for: Electronic Music, New Media Art, Performance art
- Notable work: 'Ain't Nothin', 'Dizzillusionz', 'Worked'
- Movement: Conceptual, Internet Art, New Media Art, Postinternet
- Awards: Rhizome MicroGrant, 2015
- Website: https://raf-i-a.tumblr.com/

RaFia Santana is a non-binary American artist, musician, and performer based in Brooklyn, NY. Her work ranges from animated gifs to self-portraiture, videos, and performance to editioned clothing and electronic music exploring gentrification, the millennial mindset, mental health, and the lived black experience. They use the internet as a medium to share their artwork, empower black and brown communities, and challenge ideas of solidarity and alliance. She had exhibitions and/or performances at the Eyebeam, AdVerse Fest, SleepCenter, Times Square Arts, International Center of Photography, Schomburg Center for Research in Black Culture, Babycastles, Museum of the Moving Image and Museum of Contemporary African Disaporan Arts, Roots & Culture amongst many notable venues. Her work has been featured in publications such as Huffington Post, HyperAllergic, Rhizome, ArtFCity, Vogue, Teen Vogue and Salon. They have participated in panels, performances and discussions such as Cultured Magazine, "Late at Tate Britain", Creative Tech Week NYC, Afrotectopia at Google NYC, NYU, "Black Portraitures IV: The Color of Silence" at Harvard University and International Center for Photography. Their music is released through Never Normal Records.

== Background ==
Santana was born and raised in Brooklyn, NY. Coming from a family of creatives where her mother, Marilyn Nance is a photographer and father a documentary filmmaker, Santana was encouraged to make art as they were growing up. They studied photography at Purchase College.

== Career ==
=== Animated GIFs ===
Throughout their career, Santana has been invited to contribute animated gifs and graphics to online exhibitions and publications such as Body Anxiety, "Bitrates" at Shiraz Art House. Her gif work has been critically reviewed by The New Inquiry, Vice, Blavity and ArtFCity. Of her gif work, Paddy Johnson and Rea McNamara of ArtFCity have opined " Santana is one of the rare digital artists exploring the vernacular of race, advertising and pop culture."

==== GIF Six-Pack (2016) ====
In context of Black History Month and Beyonce's release of "Formation", Vice columnist invited Santana as one of six artists to contribute gifs that speak out against anti-Blackness and cultural assimilation. Under her gif, RaFia is quoted: “People of color are underrepresented in every community that white people have ever presented due to the conditioning we’ve received that white is standard. White people are looked at and heard first while POC are represented only if they excel past that standard. Until we’ve abolished the white standard, people of color will always be underrepresented. We’re all here though.”

=== Worked (2015) ===
Worked is a digitally manipulated image of the artist, partially naked with her lower body away from the camera as she gazes forward whilst wearing an apron. It was made with the intention of defying stereotypes around black, femme and queer bodies.

=== 'SELFiE' (2015) ===
In 2015, Santana mounted a solo show showcasing digitally manipulated images with soundscapes at the Museum of Contemporary African Diasporan Arts.

=== RaFia's World (2016) ===
Commissioned by a Rhizome Microgrant in 2015, 'RaFia's World' is a static website serving as an archive of written works and drawings from Santana's childhood. In a profile with Rhizome, Santana tells Cepeda, "Rafia’s World in its original form exists on my mother's website. It is a selection of memories written anecdotally that I illustrated at age six for the purpose of living on my mom’s website as an art piece (my first net art!). It remains there unchanged ten years later. The new RAFiA’s WORLD is a collection of illustrations I made for school assignments and leisure that spans the course of eight years, following my developing consciousness and growth as a kid and artist."

=== #POWERVHS (2016) ===
‘#POWERVHS’ is a 9-artist visual mixtape that Santana compiled to empower black, brown women and queer femme/non-binary artists. It features video works by Hattie Ball, Michelle Marie Charles, Angelina Fernández, Reagan Holiday, María José, Nandi Loaf, Liz Mputu, Sondra Perry, and Santana herself. The compilation debuted at Disclaimer Gallery on 603 Bushwick Ave, Brooklyn and is available at Printed Matter.

=== #PAYBLACKTIME (since 2016) ===
"#PAYBLACKTIME" is a grassroots initiative started by Santana to collect funds for food delivery through Seamless and Grubhub to marginal individuals who can't afford meals. In an interview with Vogue, writer Sandra Song summarizes its goal of turning racial allies' guilt into meaningful action: "...the #PAYBLACKTiME initiative, which allows the people asking "Well what can I do to help marginalized folks?" to manifest their intentions into something tangible — i.e. food for hungry black and brown people." In its first three months, #PAYBLACKTiME transferred over $6,000 in donations into meals purchased. The work is now archived in Rhizome's Net Art Anthology.

=== re:trospective (2018) ===
As a parody retrospective of emerging artists curated by maneul abreu, the exhibition featured artworks made by artists of colour in a storefront space located in the gentrified and trendy neighborhood of Bushwick. Of Santana's animation, critic Whitney Mallet writes, "Santana’s video work, which saw digitally rendered faces, including the artist’s and abreu’s, morph and distort."

=== Midnight Moment residency (2019) ===
As part of Midnight Moment's residency, Santana created a multi-billboard animated video piece that would show for a minute every night for a month in New York in April 2019. Titled Dizzillusions -the same title as their coterminously released album-the installation featured RaFia's face animated amongst pink and purple backgrounds.

=== Dizillusions (2019) ===
Dizillusions is a rap and electronic EP released in April 2019 through Never Normal Records. Vogue writer Rachel Hahn observed that "the music video of track "Ain't Nothin'" directly references her Times Square installation with lyrics like, “I’m gonna make it big/I’mma see my name in all of them lights.”...which depicts Santana dancing in the middle of Times Square while her animated face takes over the billboards in the background."
