= The East (Brooklyn) =

Black Nationalist organization in Brooklyn, New York City

The East was a community education and arts organization in Brooklyn, New York City focused on Black nationalism.

== Founding and activities ==
Founded in 1969 in Brooklyn, New York City by a group including students from the African American Student Association (ASA) and Jitu Weusi (Les Campbell), The East was a community education and arts organization based on principles of self-determination, nation building, and Black consciousness. It served as a branch of Amiri Baraka’s Congress of African People (CAP) until 1974, when The East pulled out of CAP due to CAP's ideological shift towards increased Marxism.

Originally located at 10 Claver Place in the Bedford-Stuyvesant neighborhood of Brooklyn, The East served as a hive of many activities. It provided day care for children and evening classes for adults, and served as home for Black News, a bookstore, restaurant, catering service, food co-op, and a bi-weekly national Black nationalist news publication. The East functioned as home to an independent African-centered school named Uhuru Sasa Shule (whose name translates to "Freedom Now" in Kiswahili) that emerged in response to the 1968 Ocean-Hill Brownsville school crisis.

The East was also an important art center in Brooklyn, serving as a weekend jazz club, salon, and concert venue for Black musicians and rivaling the popular clubs and theaters of Harlem. It hosted performers including the Last Poets, Freddie Hubbard, Betty Carter, McCoy Tyner, Max Roach, Sun Ra, Lee Morgan, and Roy Ayers. Its name was included in the album title of Pharoah Sanders' "Live At The East."

There were two extensions of The East, one named The Mid-East located in Brownsville, Brooklyn managed by Yusef & Dara Iman and The Far-East managed by John Watusi Branch with Yusef & Kubballah Waliyaya in Queens and, until 1974, hosted jazz, drama, dance, and poetry, as well as evening classes and a Uhuru Sasa preschool. One major legacy of The East is its African Street Festival, now operating as an annual event in Bedford-Styuvesant known as the International African Arts Festival.

== In popular culture ==
A documentary film, The Sun Rises in The East by Tayo Giwa and Cynthia Gordy Giwa, was released in 2022.

== See also ==
- New York City teachers' strike of 1968
