= Central Brooklyn Jazz Consortium =

U.S. non-profit organization

The Central Brooklyn Jazz Consortium (CBJC) is a not for profit arts organization. Jitu Weusi was one of the co-founders. CBJC organized an annual jazz festival in Central Brooklyn, New York, and created the Brooklyn Jazz Hall of Fame and Museum. The festival occurs every April.

The festival presents 35 events on 23 days with over 100 musicians performing in clubs, venues, colleges, faith-based and cultural institutions throughout this borough of New York City. Brooklynites, jazz musicians such as Cecil Payne, Betty Carter, and Kenny Durham as well as less heralded artists Cal Massey, Betty Roche, Gigi Gryce, and C. Scoby Stroman contributions are remembered by way of conferences and performances.

== Hall of fame ==
The Brooklyn Jazz Hall of Fame was established in 1999. A museum component added in 2009 to immortalize musicians, venues, and preserve artifacts which perpetuate Brooklyn's jazz legacy. Members of the Brooklyn Jazz Hall of Fame include: Lena Horne, Max Roach, Cecil Payne, Randy Weston, Eubie Blake, Herbie Mann, C. Scoby Stroman, Ahmed Abdul-Malik, Wynton Kelly, Irving "Duke" Jordan, Ronnie Mathews, Ernie Henry, Kenny Kirkland, Stanley Banks, Noel Pointer, and Chief Baba Neil Clarke (2026) just to name several.

The hall of fame awards notable Brooklyn jazz musicians, community members, and venues who have made an impact on Brooklyn's jazz community; the Deacon Leroy Applin Young Lion(ess) Award is given to parvenu.

=== Inductees ===
- Ahmed Abdul-Malik
- Roland Alexander
- Chief Bey
- Eubie Blake
- Art Blakey
- Joe Carroll
- Betty Carter
- Kenny Dorham
- Leonard Gaskin
- Gigi Gryce
- Ernie Henry
- Lena Horne
- Freddie Hubbard
- Cal Massey
- Carmen McRae
- Montego Joe
- Cecil Payne
- Noel Pointer
- Max Roach
- Betty Roché
- Hazel Scott
- Ulysses Slaughter
- Clifton Small
- C. Scoby Stroman
- Wally Gator Watson
- Mary Lou Williams
