= Anti-Arabism in Turkey =

In Turkey, while most instances of anti-Arab racism have been brutally directed against Syrian refugees, the phenomenon has more recently grown to include other Arabs, such as those from the Gulf countries. Rising levelsof anti-Arab racism have also been attributed to the Turkish economic crisis. Additionally, it is also rooted in Turkey's migrant crisis, which began alongside the Arab Spring; the Turkish government had documented 3.7 million Syrians as refugees by 2018. That same year, the United Nations reported that 63.4% of all registered Syrian refugees in the world were in Turkey. A number of Turkish politicians have been critical of the large Arab presence in the country since the beginning of the Syrian Civil War. Both the CHP and the Victory Party criticized Erdoğan for his stance on Syrian refugees. Erdoğan remained the preferred candidate for many Arabs in Turkey because of the government's stance on refugees and CHP's cordial rhetoric toward the Assad regime.

== Ottoman Empire ==
The Ottoman Empire was a multi-cultural polity, spanning the Middle East and North Africa and large parts of Eastern Europe. By the early 20th century, most high government positions were held by Rumelian and European elites, except for the Emirate of Hejaz under Ottoman rule, although Arabs did maintain positions of power and many territories retained local autonomy.

== Republic of Turkey ==
Haaretz reported that anti-Arabism in Turkey mainly affects two groups: tourists from the Gulf countries who are characterized as "rich and condescending"; and Syrian refugees. It also reported that anti-Syrian sentiment in Turkey is metastasizing into a general hostility towards all Arabs, including the Palestinians.

Turkey's decision to accept Syrian refugees under Turkish president Recep Tayyip Erdoğan have contributed to rise of xenophobia in many opposition parties. Ümit Özdağ, the former deputy-chairman of the Victory Party, warned that Turkey risked becoming "a Middle Eastern country" because of the influx of Arab refugees.

Until the 21st century, "Arab" was a term in Turkey claimed for black dogs, or any dogs with a dark coat.

=== Portrayal of Arabs in Turkish society ===
Due to portrayal of Arab Revolt within atheist and nationalist Arab and Turkish circles even if not fully historical, there is a strong negative depiction which was dated from Kemalist Turkey in the 1930s, associating Arabs with “backwardness.” This has continued influencing modern Turkish historiography and the crusade of Turkish soft power, with Arabs being frequently stereotyped as evil, uncivilized, terrorists, and incompetent. Such depictions are frequently used in contrast to the alleged depiction of Turkic peoples as "noble, generous, fearsome, loyal, brave and spirited warriors."

Anti-Arab sentiment is also further fueled by ultranationalist groups, including the Grey Wolves and pan-Turkist nationalist parties, who called for invasions of Syria and Iraq to prevent the alleged ongoing Arab persecutions of their Turkic populations.

Growing influx of Syrian refugees in Turkey led to a wave of anti-Arabism, especially from secular urban groups.

==== Syrians ====
Syrian Arabs are the most frequent targets in Turkey. With the Syrian Civil War that started in 2011, Syrians who came to Turkey are exposed to discrimination in many areas. According to researcher Şenay Özden, racist attitudes and discourses towards Syrians in Turkey increased with the thought that refugees are permanent in Turkey. 92% of Syrians living in Turkey state that they are exposed to discrimination.

In the research conducted by the International Organization for Migration with 636 people, it was determined that nearly half of the participants saw the Syrians as a "less talented race". In addition, one third of the participants stated that they believe that Syrian refugees are not victims of war. Although more than half of the participants stated that they encounter Syrians every day, only 22% of them declared that they had any contact with Syrians.

Economic problems and unemployment in Turkey are associated with Syrian refugees by some. It is stated that these problems strengthen the negative perspective towards Syrians and trigger racism more. Researches reveal that the economically weak part of the public, in particular, sees Syrian refugees as the chief culprit of economic problems. Reports stating that anti-Syrian sentiment is most intensely carried out by those with a weak economic situation, show that the main reason for this is mostly Syrian refugees working in sectors that require cheap labor.

There is a correlation between racist violence attempts against Syrians and Syrians working informally. Anti-Syrian sentiment has increased during election periods. Political parties' making political announcements and statements over Syrians as a voting tool is directly related to the racist attacks that Syrians are exposed to.

Within the realm of social media, immigration attitudes tend to align with the concept of "welfare chauvinism," where Turkish citizens are viewed as deserving priority access to government-provided social benefits. The onset of the COVID-19 pandemic has catalyzed this sentiment, leading to exclusionary attitudes towards immigrants. Additionally, public declarations from policymakers touting generous public spending towards immigrants have evoked negative reactions among social media users. Nativist sentiments that incorporate a patronizing tolerance towards immigrants bear a striking resemblance to social dynamics observed in societies that are ethnically or racially divided. Adopting a supremacist ethos, such sentiments offer limited inclusion to migrants, but only under stringent conditions. Above all else, immigrants are expected to exhibit docility to such a degree that they must remain silent on political matters that have a direct impact on their lives and futures. Furthermore, immigrants are expected to overtly express their gratitude. In recent times, the public sentiment on Syrian immigrants in Turkish social media has shifted towards a more positive outlook. This shift coincided with Turkish forces launching a cross-border operation in Syria, followed by Turkish authorities opening the European border for Syrian immigrants. This trend suggests that refugees and immigrants are viewed as instruments to embarrass the rhetorical enemy of Turkish civilizationism, namely Western civilization. While refugees and immigrants serve this purpose well, the ultimate decision to remain or depart rests with them. Hence, the notion of patronizing tolerance serves as a pervasive theme in the context of immigrant-host society relationships in Turkey.

There are also those who hold Syrian refugees responsible for the increase in rents and the increase in prices in the markets. According to Metin Çorabatır, head of the Center for Asylum and Migration Studies, the reason for this prejudice and racist attitudes towards Syrians is fake news on social media. In addition, non-governmental organizations and researchers state that the language and style used for Syrians in the news given by the media trigger racist attacks and behavior against Syrians, and they accuse anti-Syrian social media posts. The lack of transparency in the aid provided by the state to Syrians further increases hate speech in society.

In line with the above, according to a study conducted in Gaziantep in 2021, it was determined that the biggest concern among Syrians was racism and economic problems. Similarly, according to Metin Çorabatır of the Center for Asylum and Migration Studies, all Syrians in Turkey are exposed to racist rhetoric and actions.

Teachers state that some of the Syrian students are constantly in the psychology of exclusion and oppression, and accordingly, behaviors that transcend the limits in rulelessness are observed. Teachers who work in schools with Syrians and have burnout syndrome state that violence at school has increased.

== See also ==
- 515 Hashemites
- Anti-Arabism
- Anti–Middle Eastern sentiment
- Antisemitism in Turkey
- Racism and discrimination in Turkey
- Anti-Armenian sentiment in Turkey
- Anti-Arabism in Kurdistan
- Human rights in Turkey
- Refugees of the Syrian Civil War in Turkey
