= Anti–Middle Eastern sentiment =

Dislike of people from the Middle East

Anti–Middle Eastern sentiment is hostility to, prejudice towards, or discrimination against people who belong to or originate from the various ethnic groups of the Middle East. Although it is commonly associated with Islamophobia, as Muslims constitute the majority of the region's population, it is a distinct type of hatred in itself and may not always stem from religion-based animosity. People who harbour negative feelings towards the region's people view them as barbaric and inferior on racial, ethnic, cultural, or religious grounds, or a combination of any of these factors.

== United States ==
In 1993, the American-Arab Anti-Discrimination Committee (ADC) confronted The Walt Disney Company about anti-Arab content in the 1992 animated film Aladdin. At first, Disney denied any problems, but eventually relented and changed two lines in the opening song. However, ADC members were still unhappy with the portrayal of Arab characters and the referral to the Middle East as "barbaric" in the film.

=== Since the 9/11 attacks ===
Since the September 11 attacks, anti–Middle Eastern sentiment, particularly directed at Arabs or at those who are perceived as Arabs, has risen dramatically. A man in Houston, Texas, was shot and wounded after an assailant accused him of "blowing up the country" and four immigrants were shot and killed by a man named Larme Price, an American serial killer who confessed to murdering them to take revenge; Price said he was motivated by a desire to kill people of Arab descent after the 11 September attacks, which had been carried out by al-Qaeda in 2001. Although Price described his victims as Arabs, only one of them was from an Arab country. This appears to be a trend; because of stereotypes of Arabs, several non-Arab and non-Muslim groups were subjected to attacks in the wake of 9/11, including several Sikhs, who were frequently attacked after being mistakenly identified as Muslims due to their religiously mandated turbans. Price's mother Leatha said that her son's anger at Arabs was a matter of mental illness, not ethnic hatred. The murder of Balbir Singh Sodhi is another example of a Sikh man who was targeted in a hate crime motivated by Islamophobia, despite the fact that Sodhi was neither Muslim nor of Middle Eastern descent.

The Equal Employment Opportunity Commission brought charges against NCL America Inc., alleging that the company had discriminated against seven crew members with Middle East backgrounds. The suit filed on behalf of the employees, stated that the discrimination led to the plaintiffs losing their jobs aboard the cruise ship Pride of Aloha. The 2006 lawsuit had the company deny the allegations, refusing to accept that it had acted improperly in firing the seven Middle Eastern crew members. Sources stated that the two sides reached a settlement agreement, in which NCL America Inc. has agreed to pay $485,000 to resolve allegations. Additionally, the company also agreed to revise its policies to ensure a workplace that promotes equal employment opportunities.

In an interview with a conservative website, Saucedo Mercer, a Mexican immigrant who became a U.S. citizen, talked in depth about her views on immigration to the United States. She stated the issue was important because people from places other than Mexico were among those coming across the border illegally.

"That includes Chinese, Middle Easterners. If you know Middle Easterners, a lot of them, they look Mexican or they look, you know, like a lot of people in South America; dark skin, dark hair, brown eyes. And they mix. They mix in. And those people, their only goal in life is to cause harm to the United States. So why do we want them here, either legally or illegally? When they come across the border, besides the trash that they leave behind, the drug smuggling, the killings, the beheadings. I mean, you are seeing stuff. It’s a war out there."

After the Boston Marathon bombing, before the perpetrators Dzhokhar Tsarnaev and Tamerlan Tsarnaev—both Chechens—were identified, several young men, mostly of South Asian or Middle Eastern descent, were convicted in the court of public opinion.

== Australia ==
Attacks in Spain, London, and Bali have increasingly associated people of "Middle Eastern appearance" with terrorism. A clearer picture of the impact of these events on Sydney's Muslim, Arabic, and Middle Eastern population emerged from data collected from a hotline between 12 September 2001, and 11 November 2001, by the Community Relations Commission for a Multicultural NSW, during which time 248 incidents were logged. There were seven categories of attack: physical assault; verbal assault; sexual assault; threat; racial discrimination or harassment, damage to property; and media attack. Half of all victims were female; thirty percent were children. The largest language groups to use the hotline were Arabic, comprising 52.4% of calls. 47.2% of the incidents occurred in public spaces.

On 11 December 2005, a violent mob of about five thousand young white Australians gathered on the beach at Cronulla, New South Wales. Waving Australian flags, and singing Waltzing Matilda and Australia's national anthem, the mob verbally abused and physically assaulted anyone of Middle Eastern appearance. Five thousand people reportedly gathered at the site and marched through the streets of Cronulla, attacking anyone who they identified as Middle Eastern.

One victim recalled how the violence erupted when a man deemed to be "of Middle Eastern appearance" was walking along the beachfront with his girlfriend and "two girls turned around and screamed ... 'get off our f__king beaches' [and then] the whole street turned on them" The riots put the spotlight on two segments of Sydney's population (the white, Anglo-Celtic majority and a Middle Eastern minority) and two parts of the city: the Sutherland Shire Local Government Area (LGA), located in Sydney's southern suburbs where Cronulla Beach is located (known as the Shire); and the Canterbury and Bankstown LGAs, located in south-western Sydney, where most of the city's Lebanese and other Middle Eastern immigrants live. Middle Eastern males were tagged as criminal and un-Australian by the media brush of ethnic crime.

In one incident, two young men of Middle Eastern appearance, on their way for a swim, were mobbed and beaten on a train carriage, with both responding police officers and a nearby press photographer fearing there would be a killing.

The latest incident occurred in 2011, when the criminal lawyer of Middle Eastern background, Adam Houda, was arrested for refusing a frisk search and resisting arrest after having been approached by police, who suspected him of involvement in a recent robbery. These charges were thrown out of court by Judge John Connell, who stated, "At the end of the day, there were three men of Middle Eastern appearance walking along a suburban street, for all the police knew, minding their own business at an unexceptional time of day, in unexceptional clothing, except two of the men had hooded jumpers. The place they were in could not have raised a reasonable suspicion they were involved in the robberies."

== Turkey ==
Negative sentiments towards Middle Eastern individuals, Middle Eastern history, and peoples are also observed in Turkey. This sentiment reached its peak during incidents such as the genocide of Anatolian Greeks, Armenians, and Lebanese populations. Furthermore, the Turkish government consistently expresses a desire to join Europe and disassociate itself from being perceived as part of the Middle East. Such rhetoric is commonly encountered in Turkish politics, as being associated with the Middle East is generally viewed unfavorably within the secular parts of Turkey. Ümit Özdağ, the former deputy Chairman of the Good Party, warned that Turkey risked becoming "a Middle Eastern country" because of the influx of refugees.

== South Korea ==
In 2018, the arrival of approximately 500 Yemeni asylum seekers on Jeju Island prompted widespread, intense anti-immigrant sentiment, with over 700,000 individuals signing an online petition urging the government to reject their applications and deport them.

== See also ==
- Anti-Arab sentiment
  - Anti-Palestinian sentiment
  - Anti-Syrian sentiment
- Anti-Armenian sentiment
- Anti-Assyrian sentiment
- Anti-Azerbaijani sentiment
- Anti-Greek sentiment
- Anti-Iranian sentiment
- Anti-Jewish sentiment
  - Anti-Israeli sentiment
- Anti-Kurdish sentiment
