= Mark Anthony Stroman =

American spree killer (1969–2011)

- Born: October 13, 1969; Dallas, Texas, U.S.
- Died: July 20, 2011 (aged 41); Huntsville Unit, Huntsville, Texas, U.S.
- Cause of death: Execution by lethal injection
- Motive: Anti-Arab racism Islamophobia "Revenge" for 9/11
- Convictions: Capital murder Robbery; Burglary; Theft of property Credit card abuse (2 counts)
- Penalty: Death (April 5, 2002)

Details
- Victims: Waqar Hasan, 46; Vasudev Patel, 49
- Span of crimes: September 15 – October 4, 2001
- Locations: Dallas, Texas; Mesquite, Texas

Mark Anthony Stroman (October 13, 1969 – July 20, 2011) was an American neo-Nazi and spree killer who carried out a shooting spree in the aftermath of the September 11 attacks, killing two people and seriously injuring a third. His motive for the shooting spree was "revenge" for the September 11 attacks, as he specifically targeted Arabs or people who looked "of Muslim descent." However, his victims were all from South Asia, with one of the two murder victims being Hindu. Stroman was executed in Texas for the murders in 2011.

== Early life ==
Mark Anthony Stroman was born on October 13, 1969, in Dallas, Texas. He was allegedly abused as a child by his stepfather. According to a documentary film about his life, Stroman got married at 15 and had children shortly after. He identified as a white supremacist and was a member of the Aryan Brotherhood of Texas. Just prior to his shooting spree, he was free on bond for a gun possession arrest. Stroman had several previous convictions for burglary, credit card fraud, robbery, and theft. He served at least two prison terms and had been paroled twice. His juvenile record showed he was involved in an armed robbery at the age of 12. He was covered in tattoos featuring Nazi and KKK images.

== Shooting spree ==
On September 15, 2001, Stroman walked into a Pleasant Grove convenience store in Dallas, Texas, called Mom's Grocery. He encountered 46-year-old Waqar Hasan, a Muslim Pakistani immigrant who owned the store and had moved to the area that same year. As Hasan grilled hamburgers, Stroman fatally shot Hasan in the head and fled the store.

On September 21, Stroman walked into a gas station in Dallas, where he encountered 28-year-old Rais Bhuiyan, a former Bangladeshi air force pilot who worked there as a cashier. Stroman pointed a double-barreled shotgun at Bhuiyan. Thinking it was an armed robbery, Bhuiyan began to empty the cash register, but Stroman instead asked Bhuiyan where he was from. Before Bhuiyan could give a proper answer, Stroman shot him once in the head. Bhuiyan fell to the floor and collapsed while Stroman left the store. Bhuiyan was left partially blinded in his right eye from the shooting.

On October 4, Stroman shot and killed 49-year-old Vasudev Patel, a Hindu Indian immigrant who worked at a gas station in Mesquite, Texas. Patel had moved from India to Texas in 1983 and was a naturalized U.S. citizen. Stroman murdered Patel during an attempted armed robbery at the gas station, which was caught on video by a store security camera. Stroman entered the station with a .44-caliber handgun and demanded money from Patel. Patel tried reaching for a gun that he kept hidden under the counter, but Stroman shot Patel in the chest before he could grab it in time. Patel fell to the floor and lay dying while Stroman tried to force open the cash register. Unable to open the register, Stroman fled the store empty-handed.

== Trial and execution ==
Stroman was captured on October 5. He said he had targeted Arabs in revenge for the 9/11 attacks. He claimed his sister died during the attacks, although court documents showed there was no evidence she ever existed. He told police he was avenging the deaths of those who died on 9/11 and had targeted his victims specifically because they looked like people "of Muslim descent". At the time of his arrest, he told police he had done what every American wanted to and that they were at war.

On November 15, 2001, Stroman was charged with capital murder. On April 5, 2002, a jury found him guilty and he was sentenced to death.

A year after the killings, Stroman expressed no remorse for his crimes. He wrote on his blog that what he did was not a crime of hate but an act of passion and patriotism. Up until his date of execution, Bhuiyan protested Stroman's death sentence, believing he did not deserve to be executed. Bhuiyan sued and tried to stop the execution but was unsuccessful. Bhuiyan argued that his Muslim beliefs told him to forgive Stroman and that killing him was not the solution. The courts denied his requests.

In his later years of imprisonment, Stroman expressed remorse for his crimes. After learning that Bhuiyan was appealing to save his life, Stroman changed his views, and described Bhuiyan as "an inspiring soul". His racist views were reportedly altered. He eventually spoke to Bhuiyan and thanked him for his compassion.

Stroman was executed on July 20, 2011, by lethal injection at the Huntsville Unit state prison in Huntsville, Texas. He was cremated and his ashes were scattered over the Grand Canyon. Prior to his execution, Stroman spoke his final words: "Even though I lay on this gurney, seconds away from my death, I am at total peace. May the Lord Jesus Christ be with me. I am at peace. Hate is going on in this world and it has to stop. Hate causes a lifetime of pain. Even though I lay here I am still at peace. I am still a proud American, Texas loud, Texas proud. God bless America, God bless everyone. Let's do this damn thing. Director Hazelwood, thank you very much. Thank you everyone. Spark, I love you, all of you. I love you Conna. It's all good, it's been a great honor. I feel it; I am going to sleep now. Goodnight, 1, 2 there it goes."

== In popular culture ==
In 2016, a documentary film called An Eye for an Eye was released by filmmaker Ilan Ziv. The film documents Stroman's path from revenge killer to being forgiven by his victims. The film features interviews with family members of the victims as well as Stroman himself prior to his execution.

== See also ==
- List of people executed in Texas, 2010–2019
- List of people executed in the United States in 2011
- Murder of Balbir Singh Sodhi, hate crime victim who was murdered in revenge for 9/11
- Larme Price, serial killer whose motive was revenge for 9/11

Executions carried out in Texas
Preceded by Humberto Leal Garcia Jr. July 7, 2011	Mark Anthony Stroman; July 20, 2011	Succeeded by Martin Robles August 10, 2011
Executions carried out in the United States
Preceded by Thomas Paul West – Arizona July 19, 2011	Mark Anthony Stroman – Texas; July 20, 2011	Succeeded by Andrew Grant DeYoung – Georgia July 20, 2011
