= Rais Bhuiyan =

Bangladeshi-American technology professional (born 1973)

- Born: Raisudden Bhuiyan; September 1973 (age 53); Dhaka, Bangladesh
- Occupation: Technology professional
- Website: WorldWithoutHate.org

Raisuddin "Rais" Bhuiyan (Bengali: রইস ভূঁইয়া; born September 1973) is a Bangladeshi American working as a technology professional in Dallas. A former officer in the Bangladesh Air Force, he was a student of Sylhet Cadet College who had gone to New York City to study computer technology. After the September 11 terror attacks, Bhuiyan was one of the three people shot by white supremacist Mark Anthony Stroman. Bhuiyan survived, but lost sight in one of his eyes.

Bhuiyan gained media attention after revealing that he would appeal to the court to save Stroman from the death penalty. He told MSNBC, "I'm trying to do my best not to allow the loss of another human life. I'll knock on every door possible". He said, "In Islam it says that saving one human life is the same as saving the entire mankind. Since I forgave him, all those principles encouraged me to go even further, and stop his execution and save another human life". He started a movement named World Without Hate to prevent hate crimes through education and worked with Amnesty International.

== Victim of terrorism ==
Bhuiyan had moved to Texas from New York as it was cheaper and a friend had offered a partnership at a gas station. After the September 11 attacks, day laborer Mark Anthony Stroman went on a killing spree against people who he viewed as Muslim, with the apparent intention of seeking revenge for the 9/11 attacks. On September 15, 2001, Pakistani immigrant Waqar Hasan, 46, was shot and killed inside of a grocery store located at 10819 Elam Rd. in Dallas, Texas. Six days later, Stroman, armed with a shotgun, walked into a convenience store located at 521 S. Buckner Blvd. in Dallas. Bhuiyan, who was working behind the counter and believed Stroman was robbing him, began to collect money to hand over. As Stroman approached the counter, he asked, "Where are you from?" Before Bhuiyan could answer, Stroman shot him in the face. Bhuiyan ran to the barbershop next door, and a man in the shop called 911.

== Aftermath ==
While the police were investigating the shooting, Indian immigrant Vasudev Patel was killed in Mesquite, Texas, on October 4, 2001. Stroman was soon captured and called TV stations from his jail cell to talk about how he was a patriot for killing the men. He sent a letter to a friend from prison in 2002, saying the attacks were revenge: "Here sits the Arab Slayer. For what he did, we should make him our mayor," he wrote. "Patriotic, yes indeed, a true American, a special breed."

Bhuiyan was left with no money and had to go deeply in debt to restore his vision. "I had to go through several surgeries and finally the doctor could save the eye, but the vision is gone, and I'm still carrying more than 35 pellets on the right side of my face," he says. "Once I touch my face, my skull, I can feel it's all bumpy. It took several years to go through all these painful surgeries one after another one."

Despite these hardships, Bhuiyan forgave Stroman and took up the cause of preventing his execution. Stroman would go on to repudiate his white supremacist beliefs. In an interview with the New York Times, he wrote: "I have The Islamic Community Joining in [my legal defence]...Spearheaded by one Very Remarkable man Named Rais Bhuiyan, Who is a Survivor of My Hate. His deep Islamic Beliefs Have gave him the strength to Forgive the Un-forgiveable ... that is truly Inspiring to me, and should be an Example for us all. The Hate, has to stop, we are all in this world together." They reconciled before Stroman's death. Hours before Stroman's execution, Bhuiyan spoke with Stroman, over the phone, for the first time since the shooting. "I forgive you and I do not hate you," he said. Stroman responded, "Thank you from my heart! I love you, bro. ... You touched my heart. I would have never expected this." Bhuiyan replied: "You touched mine, too."

Stroman was executed on July 20, 2011. Earlier that day, Bhuiyan's lawyers had lost a final appeal in federal court to stay Stroman's execution.

== See also ==
- Murder of Balbir Singh Sodhi
- An Eye for an Eye (2016 documentary about the relationship between Stroman and Bhuiyan)
