= Anti-Syrian refugee sentiment in Turkey =

Anti-Syrian sentiment is a discriminatory and racist approach fueled by fear, hatred, insecurity, enmity, humiliation and similar feelings towards Syrians in Turkey. With the Syrian civil war that started in 2011, Syrians who came to Turkey are exposed to discrimination in many areas. According to researcher Şenay Özden, racist attitudes and discourses towards Syrians in Turkey increased with the thought that refugees are permanent in Turkey. 92% of Syrians living in Turkey state that they are exposed to discrimination.

== Overview ==
In the research conducted by the International Organization for Migration with 636 people, it was determined that nearly half of the participants saw the Syrians as a "less talented race". In addition, one third of the participants stated that they believe that Syrian refugees are not victims of war. Although more than half of the participants stated that they encounter Syrians every day, only 22% of them declared that they had any contact with Syrians.

Economic problems and unemployment in Turkey are associated with Syrian refugees by some. It is stated that these problems strengthen the negative perspective towards Syrians and trigger racism more. Researches reveal that the economically weak part of the public, in particular, sees Syrian refugees as the chief culprit of economic problems. Reports stating that anti-Syrian sentiment is most intensely carried out by those with a weak economic situation, show that the main reason for this is mostly Syrian refugees working in sectors that require cheap labor.

According to the researches, the fact that Syrians work in jobs that require cheap labor causes the salaries of the local people to decrease, which in turn increases the aggressive attitudes towards Syrians. For these reasons, a correlation is established between racist violence attempts against Syrians and Syrians working informally. Anti-Syrian sentiment has increased during election periods. Political parties' making political announcements and statements over Syrians as a voting tool is directly related to the racist attacks that Syrians are exposed to.

There are also those who hold Syrian refugees responsible for the increase in rents and the increase in prices in the markets. According to Metin Çorabatır, head of the Center for Asylum and Migration Studies, the reason for this prejudice and racist attitudes towards Syrians is misinformation on social media. In addition, non-governmental organizations and researchers state that the language and style used for Syrians in the news given by the media trigger racist attacks and behaviors against Syrians, and they accuse anti-Syrian social media posts. The lack of transparency in the aid provided by the state to the Syrians increases the hate speech in the society.

In line with the above, according to a study conducted in Gaziantep in 2021, it was determined that the biggest concern among Syrians was racism and economic problems. Similarly, according to Metin Çorabatır of the Center for Asylum and Migration Studies, all Syrians in Turkey are exposed to racist rhetoric and actions.

Teachers state that some of the Syrian students are constantly in the psychology of exclusion and oppression, and accordingly, behaviors that transcend the limits in rulelessness are observed. Teachers who work in schools with Syrians and have burnout syndrome state that violence at school has increased.

== Events ==
In the Gazipaşa district of Antalya, the municipal council has decided to ban the entry of Syrians to the beaches in Gazipaşa. Mehmet Ali Yılmaz, the mayor of the CHP, who abstained from the voting, said, "Personally, I do not favor discriminating on the basis of their citizenship, ethnic origin or sect; I think it is not right. People should not be allowed to be disturbed. No matter who disturbs them, our police will do what is necessary." The vote, in which AKP and MHP deputies did not vote against, was accepted with the votes of CHP and IYI party deputies. Afterwards, the mayor of the city council returned the decision to the council on the grounds that it did not comply with the laws. In the re-voting, the decision was rejected after the CHP deputies changed their views.

According to a claim on social media, pastry sold to Turks for 1 lira in a restaurant opened in Izmit is sold to Syrians for 5 liras.

Reactions emerged on Twitter under the name #SuriyelilerSuriyeye, (transliteration Syrians to Syria) and many politicians stated that they would solve the refugee problem as an election promise.

As a result of the murder of a Turkish teen by a Syrian on August 12, 2021 in Ankara, protests were carried out across Turkey, and Syrian houses and workplaces were stoned in Ankara.

Beşiktaş fans chanted "I don't want refugees in my country" at the Beşiktaş-Çaykur Rizespor football match on August 13, 2021.

== See also ==
- Anti-Arabism
- Anti-Arabism in Turkey
