= An Eye for an Eye (2016 film) =

2016 documentary film

- Directed by: Ilan Ziv
- Written by: Ilan Ziv; Paul Cadieux
- Produced by: Paul Cadieux
- Production company: Filmoption International
- Release date: October 28, 2016
- Running time: 120 minutes
- Countries: United States; Canada
- Language: English

An Eye for an Eye is a 2016 documentary film directed by filmmaker Ilan Ziv. The film chronicles the story of Mark Anthony Stroman, who was convicted in 2002 of murdering two people and severely injuring a third in acts of perceived retaliation for the September 11 attacks. Stroman's path from revenge killer to being forgiven by his only surviving victim, Rais Bhuiyan, is documented as he waits on Texas' Death Row. The film opened on October 28, 2016 in the United States and Canada.

== Synopsis ==
In the weeks following the September 11 attacks, dozens of attacks against Muslims, Sikhs and other perceived 'minorities' were reported across America. Among the perpetrators was Mark Anthony Stroman, who began "hunting Arabs", as he described his nightly prowling. His targets were people he believed were Muslim and came from the Middle East. He killed two and partially blinded a young man—all immigrants from Pakistan, Bangladesh, and India. He was arrested before he followed through with his plan to massacre dozens of Muslim worshipers at a Dallas mosque. The press at the time labeled these as the first post-9/11 hate crimes and even Stroman himself stated that, "blinded by rage", he killed to avenge the United States of America. On April 5, 2002, Stroman was convicted of the murders and sentenced to death.

In the weeks prior to his impending execution, his only surviving victim became his biggest advocate – Rais Bhuiyan, a devout Muslim who was half-blinded by Stroman. He began a campaign to spare Mark's life in the name of Islam and its notion of mercy, becoming one of the most vocal campaigners against Stroman's execution.

With in-depth interviews, the film follows Stroman's story through to his execution. Central to the film is the bond that develops between Stroman and the Israeli-born filmmaker Ilan Ziv.

== Reviews ==
As of June 2020, the film has a 71% approval rating on Rotten Tomatoes, based on seven reviews with an average rating of 6.5/10. Film Journal International states, "An Eye for an Eye, tough to take as it is -- with nigh unbearable-to-listen-to audiotapes of the murder being committed -- turns out to be one of the most searingly honest and moving depictions of redemption and the power of forgiveness ever made. The Hollywood Reporter said, "as our encounters with him continue, it becomes clearer that Stroman -- whose early life is nearly guaranteed problems ahead -- evolved dramatically behind bars, and that his remorse for his crimes is sincere". The Los Angeles Times wrote "the rehabilitative power of forgiveness [throughout the film] is thought-provokingly explored". Toronto's The Globe and Mail described it as "a well-layered film" that makes "a fascinating case for forgiveness and a sharp rebuke of Bible-taught eye-for-an-eye revenge".
