= Stephen Herbits =

American businessman (born 1942)

Stephen E. Herbits (born March 13, 1942) is an American businessman, former consultant to several Secretaries and Deputy Secretaries of Defense, advisor to the Edgar M. Bronfman family, executive vice president and corporate officer of the Seagram Company, advisor to the President's Advisory Commission on Holocaust Assets, and secretary general of the World Jewish Congress. He was the youngest person to be appointed commissioner on the Gates Commission (All-Volunteer Armed Force). Herbits' career has specialized in addressing institutional problems and opportunities – governmental, business, and not-for-profit – and providing strategic planning and management consulting.

== Background ==
Son of Nathaniel and Esther Herbits of Pittsfield, Massachusetts. Herbits earned his AB from Tufts University in 1964 and his JD degree from Georgetown University Law Center in 1972. He has lived in Boston, Washington, D.C., Geneva, New York City, Tokyo, London, Seoul, Miami, and currently resides in Western North Carolina.

== Early political career (1967–1977) ==
After college and prior to starting law school, Herbits worked as research assistant for Massachusetts Attorney General Edward Brooke's successful campaign for the U.S. Senate (1966). In 1967, Herbits was hired as a Congressional staffer in Washington. It was there that Herbits developed his work on addressing the inequities of the military draft. . His work on Capitol Hill led to his providing research and editorial assistance to the publication of "How to End the Draft – The Case for an All-Volunteer Army". The book received national and international attention and subsequently, Herbits was appointed to the President's Commission on An All-Volunteer Armed Force (Gates Commission). Herbits was the youngest Commissioner to receive the appointment, being only 27 years of age. He served alongside noted economists Milton Friedman and Alan Greenspan. Subsequently, hired as the special assistant to the Assistant Secretary of Defense of Manpower and Reserve Affairs in the Department of Defense, he helped implement the transition to an All-Volunteer Armed Force at the senior level. He also authored the study (1974) which gave the acting Secretary of Defense the information used to reverse Army decisions deliberately undermining achieving the All-Volunteer Force.

In 1974, following his work as special assistant at the Department of Defense, Herbits was hired by Donald H. Rumsfeld, then chief of staff to President Gerald Ford. Following his role in the Presidential Personnel Office, he moved to Geneva as Counsel to the Head of the US Delegation to the Multilateral Trade Negotiations (then GATT) in the Office of the Special Representative for Trade Negotiations. In 1976 he moved back to the Pentagon under Rumsfeld. Herbits was named The Special Assistant to the Secretary and Deputy Secretary of Defense, a position equivalent to other departments' Chief of Staff.

While employed in the private sector, Herbits was called back to public service several times. In 1981, he served as an unpaid consultant to assist in transitions for Secretary of Defense Caspar Weinberger, in 1989 for Secretary of Defense Dick Cheney, and then again in 2001 for Secretary Donald Rumsfeld. During these transitions, Herbits developed job requirements and objectives for key Department of Defense Presidential Appointments and helped recruit and screen candidates.

Rumsfeld brought Herbits back to the Department of Defense immediately following the attacks of September 11th, 2001 to work on, among other tasks, special projects regarding internal mission development and organizational change as a result of the attacks. In this context, Herbits helped design and create a system of civilian review and succession planning for senior military officers, a project subsequently studied and published by the RAND Corporation.

On several occasions between 1969 and 1977, Herbits did project work with one of the earliest political consulting firms in the country – Bailey, Deardourff.

== Corporate career (1977–1997) ==
In 1977, Herbits was hired by the spirits and wine company, Seagram Company Ltd., a Fortune 150 Corporation. He was tasked with developing and implementing strategies for various subsidiaries. Between 1977 and 1983, Herbits held many positions in the company, including vice president of Seagram Overseas Sales Company in Tokyo, vice president of Seagram Europe in London, president of Browne Vintners in New York, and president of Seagram Wine Company in the United States.

In 1983, Herbits was promoted to vice president of corporate development and then promoted again in 1986 with the added role of external affairs. During this period, Herbits, in the additional role of chef de cabinet to Seagram Chairman and President of the World Jewish Congress, Edgar M. Bronfman, helped prepare for and traveled to meetings with world leaders. "He [Herbits] sat at the intersection of Mr. Bronfman's corporate, World Jewish Congress and other philanthropic roles."

Herbits became a corporate officer and an executive vice president of corporate policy and external affairs from 1989 to his retirement in 1997.

=== Equivalence Campaign ===
In 1985, while Herbits was vice president of corporate development at Seagram, a hefty tax was raised on liquor, significantly widening the gap with taxes for other beverage alcohol. In response, Herbits led a campaign known as "Equivalence" to educate consumers that a 12 oz can of beer, 5 oz glass of wine and a 1 1/4 oz shot of spirits all contain the same kind and amount of alcohol. This campaign received national and international media attention and was successful as the tax gap began to close during the years that followed.

=== On Retirement from Seagram ===
On retirement, Herbits formed The Herbits Group, LLC as a business consulting entity. In that capacity, he has worked for several domestic and international companies, the RAND Corporation, and the Department of Defense.

== Political career (1981–2026) ==
In addition to his return to the Pentagon on several occasions through early 2004, Herbits became a vocal proponent of Hillary Clinton and donated to her 2000 and 2006 Senate campaigns and her 2008 and 2016 presidential campaigns. He was selected to serve on Clinton's Lesbian Gay Bisexual Transgender Task Force, a steering committee that recruited many of the most powerful LGBT citizens in the nation.

He supported Obama/Biden in 2008 and 2012, including volunteering as an official poll worker for the election. He again supported Clinton in 2016, Biden in 2020, and undertook several transition projects in support of the Harris presidential campaign in 2024. Among other efforts, he has used a substantial portion of a donor-advised account to support 501(c)(3) efforts to assure a fair election. Most recently, Herbits volunteered and supported Jamie Ager's campaign to successfully flip North Carolina's Congressional District 11 in the 2026 midterms.

== World Jewish Congress and Controversies ==
Following his departure from the Defense Department in 2004, Herbits was brought into the World Jewish Congress by Edgar Bronfman, its president, because of public allegations that there were financial irregularities within the organization. Herbits was charged with the responsibility of "fixing [the] entity", as he had done for Bronfman in other areas in the past. Shortly after Herbits arrived, the New York State Attorney General's office opened up its own investigation into the financial irregularities. Herbits managed the WJC's responses to the NYS Assistant Attorney General for Charities and led the WJC to adopt a new charter, by-laws, governance structure, and financial controls. Herbits was secretary general from January 2026 through September 2007, the group's most senior professional staff position. He eventually negotiated a satisfactory Assurance of Discontinuance with the New York State Attorney's office and the departure of the long-time secretary general. Following the retirement of Edgar Bronfman, Sr. after 25 years as president, Herbits agreed to stay on for several months to assist in the transition of the incoming president. Recently, a website reported that Herbits had allegedly made an Anti-Arab slur in 2007. The report traced back to a Jerusalem Post article that the Post later permanently removed, and the New York Chronicle had based its own story on that article. At the time, the New York office of the World Jewish Congress denied the account.A subsequent review found that a former employee of the organization's Israeli branch, who had been dismissed, had given the newspaper false information.

== The City of Miami ==
Periodically, from 2004 through 2017, Herbits was a leader of a group of citizens to hold the City of Miami to the requirements of State law and regulations and county and city ordinances, rules and regulations in the approval and permitting of projects on the city's waterfront property. The primary stimulus of the project -- a massive private infrastructure project in the center of Biscayne Bay -- was never built.

== Philanthropy ==
Herbits volunteered for Gay Men's Health Crisis (known as GMHC) in the 1980s, the earliest and foremost AIDS service organization in America. He then served as treasurer and was subsequently asked to take over as President of the Board of AIDS Action Council, the Washington, D.C. policy and lobbying organization representing the AIDS service organizations across the U.S. Herbits also served in a number of different capacities for several national, New York City and Miami AIDS organizations, such as the National Task Force on AIDS (1986).

Herbits was one of the original supporters of GLAAD (the Gay and Lesbian Alliance Against Defamation) in 1986–1987 and worked with organizations such as Save DADE (1999–2002). He has provided substantial pro bono planning and strategic advice to a wide range of LGBT organizations.

He was also a founding board member and treasurer of Youth Expressions, Inc., an after-school program for at-risk youth in Miami's Haitian Community (2000–2006).
