= Larme Price =

American serial killer

- Born: June 27, 1972 (age 54); New York City, New York, U.S.
- Other names: Thrill Killer; Sept. 11 Killer; Saturday killer.40-caliber killer
- Status: Incarcerated
- Motive: Arabophobia; Islamophobia "Exacting revenge" for the September 11 attacks
- Convictions: First degree murder Second degree murder Second-degree attempted murder Criminal possession of a weapon
- Penalty: Life without parole

Details
- Victims: 4
- Span of crimes: February 8 – March 20, 2003
- Country: United States
- State: New York
- Date apprehended: March 29, 2003
- Imprisoned at: Green Haven Correctional Facility

Larme Price (born June 27, 1972) is an American serial killer who murdered four people in New York City in 2003. Price claimed he carried out the murders in revenge for the September 11 attacks and said he was driven to kill by a paranoid hatred of Arabs. Despite this claim, only one of his victims was Middle Eastern. Price confessed to the murders, was found guilty, and was sentenced to life in prison without parole.

== Early life ==
Larme Price was born on June 27, 1972, in Brooklyn, New York. According to his mother, he was a mentally disturbed drug addict. He had twice tried to check himself into mental health facilities but was turned away on both occasions. His criminal record dates back to 1989, totalling eight arrests for robbery, assault, and criminal weapons possession.

According to Price's mother, in 2001, a few weeks after the September 11 attacks, Price went crazy and could no longer control his urges to kill. His mental health problems worsened and were exacerbated by the attacks. He walked around scared all the time and said he was going to join the war. He was also convinced people were following him, including the belief that a tracking device had been installed in his hand. On October 6, 2001, he was treated at Kings County Hospital Center.

Prior to the murders, Price was an unemployed father of two children, who lived in Crown Heights with his girlfriend, who was expecting his third child. He made a living by selling stolen college textbooks.

== Murders ==
On February 8, 2003, Price shot and killed 42-year-old John Freddy, a Guyana native of Indian descent, at a convenience store in Queens, New York. Freddy was killed as he drank coffee at the Central Mini Market in Ozone Park, which was located just across the street from the supermarket he worked in. A surveillance camera showed a man in a dark coat, baseball cap, and hooded sweatshirt shooting Freddy from behind the ear. Two hours later, Price robbed the Around the Clock Minimart in Mill Basin, Brooklyn, killing 50-year-old Sukhjit "Sammy" Khajala, an Indian immigrant working as the store's cashier. Khajala was shot in the face with same gun used in Freddy's killing. According to police, the killer took $169 from the cash register and slowly walked out.

On March 10, Price shot and killed 32-year-old Albert Kotlyar, a Ukrainian immigrant who worked as a manager at Laundry King Superstore in Bedford-Stuyvesant. Kotylar had been sleeping at his booth when Price woke him up and shot him in the head. Price later claimed he killed Kotlyar because he felt disrespected when he told him he could not sit in the store unless he was doing laundry while in there. Price had been sitting in the laundry drinking hot chocolate while casing out a gas station across the street.

Ten days later, on March 20, Price shot and killed 54-year-old Mohammed Ali Nassir, a Yemeni immigrant, at the Stop II Food Market in Crown Heights. Nassir was killed as he sat in a chair near the door of the store. The killer then stuck his pistol through an opening in the plastic barrier over the counter and fired several times. He struck the other employee, Nassir's 20-year-old cousin Yakoob Aldailam in the arm, leg, and chest before fleeing. Aldailam survived and was taken to a hospital. Price later claimed he decided to shoot Nassir because he heard him speak in a foreign language and also felt watched by him.

== Arrest ==
On March 28, 2003, Price walked into the 77th Precinct station and told police he knew who was responsible for the murders. He said a man named "Dog" was behind them. However, police were not convinced and suspected Price immediately. Police noted that Price walked in a similar pigeon-toed fashion to the killer, whose walk had been seen in a surveillance video of one of the killings. He also resembled the suspect in the wanted poster. Police took his cellphone number and said they would call him the next day. The following day, police met with Price, and he confessed to the killings. He supposedly confessed after reading the Bible and noting the commandment, "Thou shalt not kill."

Police initially also tied Price to a fifth murder on March 1, 2003, when 37-year-old Marc Zanichelli was shot during a robbery at his auto shop in Brooklyn. He was later deemed to have not been the perpetrator, as Price did not confess to the killing and a .45 calibre pistol was used.

After his arrest, it was learned that on March 9, a day before the Kotlyar murder, Price had been taken to the Woodhull Medical and Mental Health Center for help by his own mother, however, he was released that same night. After searching Price's girlfriend's house, police recovered a pistol that matched the one used in Nassir's murder. They also recovered a baseball cap, hooded sweatshirt, and a jacket which they believed he had worn during the shootings. Price blamed the shootings on orders to avenge the September 11 attacks coming from his cell phone. He claimed he heard "vibes" urging him to shoot Arabs. Police say Price's main motivation for the murders was exacting revenge for the September 11 terrorist attacks.

Price was charged with four counts of murder and two counts of attempted murder. He was indicted on three counts of first degree murder. Two charges were for murder committed during the course of a robbery, while the third count charged him as a serial killer.

== Trial ==
In order to avoid the death penalty, Price struck a deal between the Brooklyn District Attorney's Office and the Capital Defenders Office. In exchange for pleading guilty, Price would be sentenced to life without parole and would avoid a death sentence. The deal was approved by Brooklyn Supreme Court Justice Neil Firetog.

On February 11, 2004, Price was found guilty and sentenced to life in prison.

== Imprisonment ==
On July 21, 2008, Price filed a pro se motion challenging his conviction, which was denied four times by Kings County Supreme Court between 2008 and 2010. A petition for a habeas corpus writ was denied on September 29, 2014.

Price was imprisoned at Sullivan Correctional Facility and since the prison's closure in November 2024, he has been incarcerated at Green Haven Correctional Facility.

== See also ==
- List of serial killers in the United States
- Murder of Balbir Singh Sodhi, hate crime victim who was murdered in revenge for 9/11
- Mark Anthony Stroman, spree killer whose motive was revenge for 9/11
