= Murder of Balbir Singh Sodhi =

Hate crime after the September 11 attacks

Balbir Singh Sodhi
- ਬਲਬੀਰ ਸਿੰਘ ਸੋਢੀ
- Undated photo of Sodhi
- Born: July 6, 1949; Jalandhar, Punjab, India
- Died: September 15, 2001 (aged 52); Mesa, Arizona, U.S.
- Occupations: Entrepreneur; franchisee; computer engineer/analyst
- Spouse: Joginder Kaur
- Children: 5

Balbir Singh Sodhi (Punjabi: ਬਲਬੀਰ ਸਿੰਘ ਸੋਢੀ; July 6, 1949 – September 15, 2001), a Sikh-American entrepreneur and franchisee in Mesa, Arizona, was murdered in a hate crime in the aftermath of the September 11 attacks. This was the first of several cases across the United States that were reported to the police as supposed acts of retaliation for the attacks. Balbir Singh Sodhi, who had a beard and wore a turban in accordance with his Sikh faith, was mistakenly profiled as an Arab Muslim and murdered by 42-year-old Frank Silva Roque (July 8, 1959 – May 11, 2022), a Boeing aircraft mechanic at a local repair facility who held a criminal record for an attempted robbery in California. Roque had reportedly told friends that he was "going to go out and shoot some towel-heads" the day of the attacks. Roque was sentenced to death (commuted later to life imprisonment) for first degree murder. He died in prison on May 11, 2022.

== Background ==
Born on July 6, 1949, in Jalandhar, Punjab, Balbir Singh Sodhi was a member of the Sikh religion. He was also a husband, and father to three sons and two daughters. He immigrated to the United States in 1989 and initially resided in Los Angeles, working at a 7-Eleven store, then driving a taxi in San Francisco. He moved with his brother to Arizona, pooling their money and buying a gas station and convenience store in Phoenix, Arizona. Sodhi's gas station had been running for just a year prior to his murder and in that time he had become known amongst the community as a generous and kind man who often gave free candy to children who came in.

On September 11, 2001, members of al-Qaeda, a militant Islamist group, hijacked four airplanes and perpetrated the September 11 attacks, killing 2,977 victims. According to family members, Sodhi had become distraught by the attacks.

== Shooting of Sodhi, others ==
On September 15, 2001, four days after the attacks, Roque took his Chevrolet S-10 from the Wild Hare sports bar in Mesa, where he had reportedly been ranting about immigrants, and drove to the Chevron gas station owned by Sodhi. Roque shot Sodhi five times from his truck with a .380 handgun, killing him. At the time of the shooting, Sodhi was helping landscaper Luis Ledesma plant flowers around the edge of his gas station in order to commemorate the lives of those lost in the 9/11 attacks. Roque, who apparently wanted revenge for the 9/11 attacks, racially profiled Sodhi as an Arab Muslim because of the clothes he wore, his turban, and his beard.

Roque then drove to his former residence, which had been purchased by a local Afghan family, and fired multiple rounds at the outside of the house. Roque then drove to a Mobil gas station ten miles (sixteen kilometers) away. Twenty minutes after the first shooting, he shot at a Lebanese-American clerk from his truck, but missed. After fleeing the scene of the final shooting, Roque was reported to have gone to a local bar and boasted, "They're investigating the murder of a turban-head down the street."

=== Attitudes towards the Sikh community post-9/11 ===
Sodhi's murder was preceded by multiple hostile incidences in the Phoenix area, targeted at Sikhs in the days following the 9/11 attacks. A Sikh spokesperson stated that it was difficult for Sikhs in the community to go to work at gas stations or to work as cashiers because of the rise in overt harassment towards them. This spokesperson also described how the appearance of Sikh men make them easy targets due to their beards and turbans which make Sikh men "look more like bin Laden than Muslims do".

After the 9/11 attacks, there was a lot of eagerness to retaliate against those who perpetrated the terror attacks, and members of the Sikh community, mainly men, became the targets of these retaliations. Sikhs became the victims of a multitude of hate crimes such as murder, redundancy, threats, and the burning of their places of worship (Gurudwaras).

Many Sikhs began experiencing acts of discrimination within their friendships and relationships that were formed prior to the terror attacks. Their relationships became strained due to suspicion, with Sikh men being asked to cut their hair and to stop wearing their turbans in order to mitigate further suspicion.

== Arrest, trial, and conviction of shooter ==
Police arrested Roque the next day, initially unaware of the later shooting incidents. He reportedly shouted slogans including "I am a patriot!" and "I stand for America all the way!" during his arrest. His bail was set at $1 million.

Roque's trial by jury began on August 18, 2003. Defense attorneys argued he was not guilty due to insanity, claiming that he had a diminished IQ and heard relentless voices telling him that Arabs were Satanic and must be killed. Two coworkers testified that Roque was "narrow-minded" and that he hated both immigrants and Arabs. Roque's defense attorney characterized him as mentally ill, and noted that his mother had twice been hospitalized for schizophrenia, a condition which has been shown to appear in those genetically predisposed to it. On September 30, 2003, he was found guilty of first degree murder, and was sentenced to death nine days later.

On July 19, 2005, Roque was found guilty of an unspecified conspiracy charge while in prison, specified only as a violent crime. On February 27, 2006, he was found guilty of having manufactured a primitive weapon in prison three days earlier. In August 2006, the Arizona Supreme Court changed Roque's death sentence to a sentence of life in prison without parole, citing his low IQ and mental illness as mitigating factors. The trial was aired by Court TV in a five-part series.

Roque died on May 11, 2022, while in Arizona Department of Corrections custody. He was 62 years old.

== Sukhpal Singh Sodhi ==
On August 4, 2002, less than a year after Balbir's death, his younger brother Sukhpal was shot to death while driving his taxicab in San Francisco, apparently killed by a stray bullet from a nearby gang fight. In response to this second tragedy, Balbir's son said, "What are you going to do with anger? We like peace and we are peaceful people."

== Memorialization of Balbir Singh Sodhi ==
Sodhi's family donated one of his turbans to the Smithsonian Museum of American History, where it is now a part of the organization's 9/11 collection.

In the months leading up to the 10-year anniversary of Sodhi's death, the Arizona Legislature decided that it wanted to remove Sodhi's name and plaque from the state's 9/11 memorial, as he was not a victim of the attacks themselves. This was vetoed by the governor after an outcry of advocacy from community groups in the area. Governor Jan Brewer vetoed the bill and continued to honor the memory of Mr. Sodhi.

== See also ==
- Sikhism in the United States
- Larme Price, serial killer whose motive was revenge for 9/11
- Mark Anthony Stroman, spree killer whose motive was revenge for 9/11
- Wisconsin Sikh temple shooting
- Anti-Middle Eastern sentiment
