= 515 Hashemites =

Arab nationalist gang in Turkey

Flag of Syria used by the group

The 515 Hashemites (Arabic: الهواشم ٥١٥; Turkish: 515 Haşimiler) were a short-lived Arab nationalist group active in Turkey.

== Symbolism ==
The number "515" is a symbol of the Arab Revolt against the Ottoman Empire which was led by Hussein bin Ali, who was from the tribe of Banu Hashim, the same one that Muhammad belonged to. The number 515 would later become an Arab nationalist symbol.

== History ==
In January 2022, when tensions between Turks and Syrians in Turkey reached a new high, an internet video went viral. The video featured a group of belligerent and defiant Arabs who appeared to be seeking trouble. They were all confirmed to be from Syria, and they called themself the 515 Hashemites as they walked down a main street carrying doner knives and wooden staffs, as well as riding in cars with “515 Hashemite” stickers on the windows, in the Seyhan district of Adana. After the video spread and caused an uproar, the General Directorate of Security launched an investigation to identify the people in the video, and soon arrested all the alleged members of the gang. 20 people were arrested and 19 of them ended up getting deported to Syria. The members belonged to various different Arab tribes and were not relatives.
