= Unemployment in Turkey =

Causes and measures of Turkish unemployment

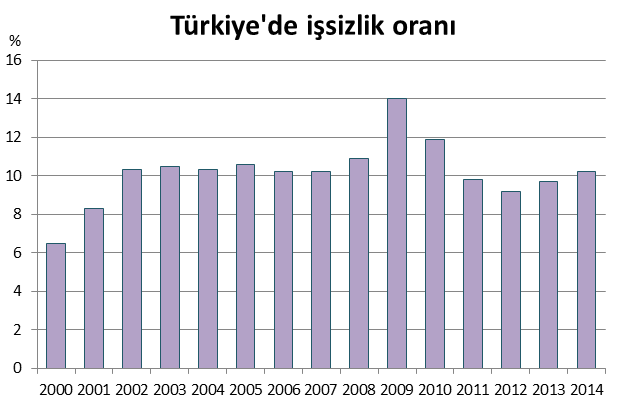
Turkey unemployment rate (IMF Data and Statistics)

Unemployment in Turkey measured by the Office for National Statistics show unemployment in Turkey at 3 647 000 (12.7%) as of December 2017. Though unemployment is a general problem for the whole world, the degree of unemployment in Turkey is especially high in respect to the other countries in the region at the same economic level. In the year 2017, the data on "youth unemployment", which indicates unemployment between 15 and 25 according to the data of the Turkish Statistical Institute (TUİK), showed a worse performance than the general unemployment rate and increased by 4.8 percentage points to 24 percent.

On 10 September 2020, a data released by the Turkish Statistical Institute (TurkStat) reported that the unemployment rate in Turkey rose to 13.4%. In July 2019, the statistics went up by 0.4% and the number of unemployed person of age 15 and over, slipped by 152,000 year-on-year. Meanwhile, the same figures flipped in 2020, as the number of unemployed people rose to 4.1 million by the end of June 2020. According to the Turkish Statistical Institute, the employment rate reached 42.4%, which was observed to be descending significantly by 4% on an annual basis.
