= 2016 Ohio State University attack =

Terrorist attack in Ohio, U.S.

Ohio State University attack
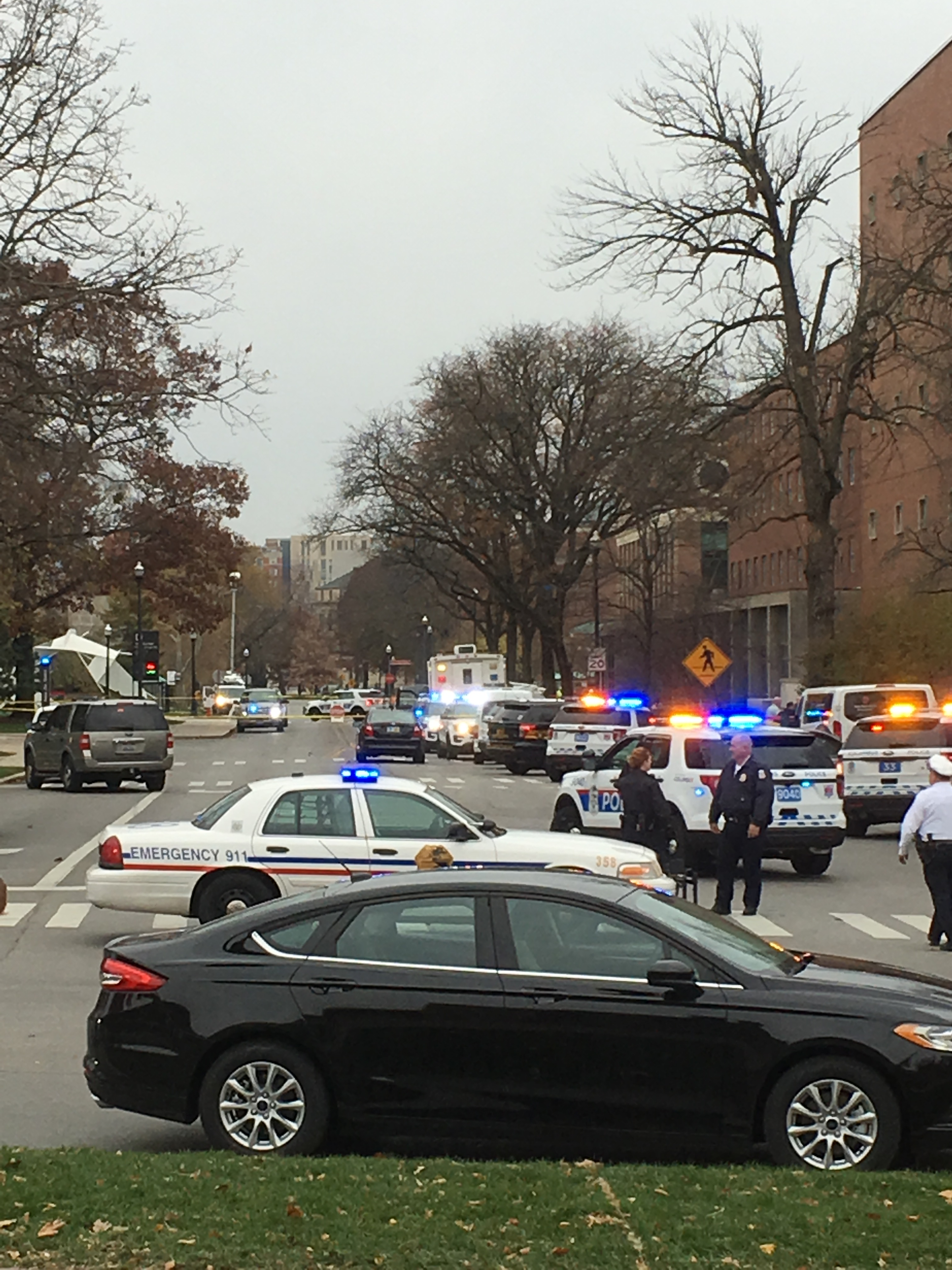
- Police presence on the OSU campus, view from Curl Market
- Location: 40.003198°N 83.010850°W; Ohio State University, Columbus, Ohio, U.S.
- Date: November 28, 2016; 9 years ago 9:52 a.m. (EST)
- Attack type: Mass stabbing, vehicular assault, terrorist attack
- Weapons: Butcher knife; 2001-2005 Honda Civic
- Deaths: 1 (the perpetrator)
- Injuries: 13 (11 directly, 1 by stray gunfire, 1 unknown injury)
- Perpetrator: Abdul Razak Ali Artan
- Motive: Islamist terrorism

On November 28, 2016, an Islamic terrorist vehicle-ramming and stabbing attack occurred at 9:52 a.m. EST at Ohio State University's Watts Hall in Columbus, Ohio. The attacker, Somali refugee Abdul Razak Ali Artan, was shot and killed by the first responding OSU police officer, and 13 people were hospitalized for injuries.

Authorities began investigating the possibility of the attack being an act of terrorism. On the next day, law enforcement officials stated that Artan was inspired by terrorist propaganda from the Islamic State of Iraq and the Levant (ISIL) and the late radical Muslim cleric, Anwar al-Awlaki. The Amaq News Agency released a statement claiming the attacker responded to an ISIL call to attack coalition citizens, though there is no evidence of direct contact between the group and Artan.

== Background ==
There had been high concerns from federal law enforcement officials about car ramming and stabbing attacks being encouraged by online extremist propaganda due to the relative ease of committing them compared to bombings. In the weeks prior to the incident, ISIL had been urging its followers to copy a car ramming attack in Nice, France, that killed 86 people.

Earlier that year in February, a man attacked patrons at the Nazareth Restaurant in Columbus, wounding four before being shot and killed by responding police officers. About seven months later, a mass stabbing occurred at the Crossroads Center shopping mall in St. Cloud, Minnesota. During the attack, a Somali refugee stabbed and injured nearly a dozen people before also being fatally shot by police. Both incidents were investigated as possible acts of terrorism. There had also been a number of recently foiled ISIL-inspired terror plots or intents to travel to the Middle East to fight for ISIL, in which the perpetrators all originated from Ohio.

In the week prior to the attack, the perpetrator, Abdul Razak Ali Artan, traveled to Washington, D.C., and purchased a knife at a Home Depot there. The day before the attack, Artan bought a second knife at a Walmart in Columbus. Investigators have not determined whether either knife was used in the attack, but were particularly suspicious of Artan traveling to the U.S. capital, roughly 400 miles (640 km) from Columbus by car, to buy a knife.

== Attack ==
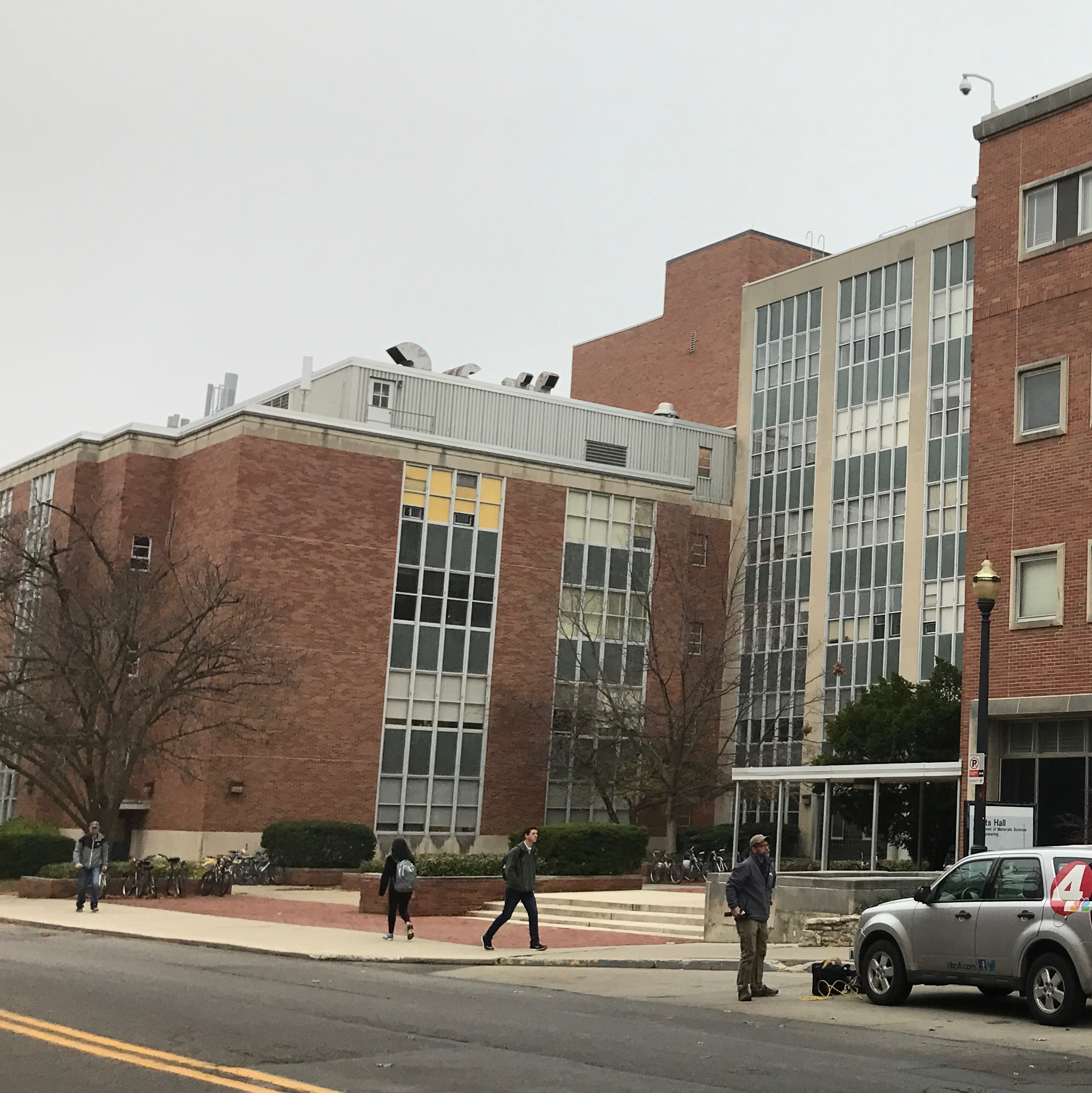
The courtyard outside Watts Hall, where the attack took place

According to the chairman of the OSU Department of Materials Science and Engineering headquartered at Watts Hall, students told him that someone called in a fluorine leak in the building, which has lab facilities. As required during emergencies, the students congregated in the courtyard outside the building. At 9:52 a.m., the attacker drove a Honda Civic into the courtyard, deliberately striking several pedestrians, including emeritus professor William Clark, before crashing into a brick wall.

As people rushed in to help the injured, the assailant got out of the car, armed with a butcher knife, "let out a war cry" according to one witness, and began attacking students. One student described a man with a knife, "chasing people around trying to attack them". Another witness recounted that the attacker did not say anything as he stabbed people. At one point, Anderson Payne, a U.S. Army veteran who was helping people struck by the vehicle, grabbed the attacker's knife and ducked under his arm in order to escape, but was unable to disarm him and had his hand slashed in the process. A student injured during the attack described seeing people screaming and fleeing before she encountered the assailant, who said "I'm going to kill you" and then slashed her left arm. The attacker was shot and killed by police within two minutes of the attack starting.

Initial reports had stated that there was an active shooter incident. At 9:54 a.m. EST, OSU sent out an emergency notification asking students to shelter in place. At 10:19 a.m. EST, police reported that the attacker had been killed by an officer after failing to comply with the officer's orders to put down his weapon. An academic adviser who witnessed the attack described seeing the assailant charge at police, who fired and shot him multiple times.

The scene was declared secure and the shelter in place order was lifted on the OSU campus at around 11:30 a.m. EST. However, subsequent Twitter posts indicated the order may have been lifted prematurely and that at least one building was still on lockdown at 12:23 p.m. EST.

A fluorine leak at Watts Hall was determined by authorities to have been unrelated to the attack.

=== Victims ===
Thirteen people were injured in the attack. Eleven of them were injured directly by the attacker; most of them were struck by his vehicle, at least two suffered stab wounds, and one victim had a fractured skull. A twelfth person was shot in the foot by a stray bullet fired by Officer Horujko, while a thirteenth person was treated for unspecified injuries. Among the victims were nine students, one faculty member, and one university worker.

=== Emergency response ===
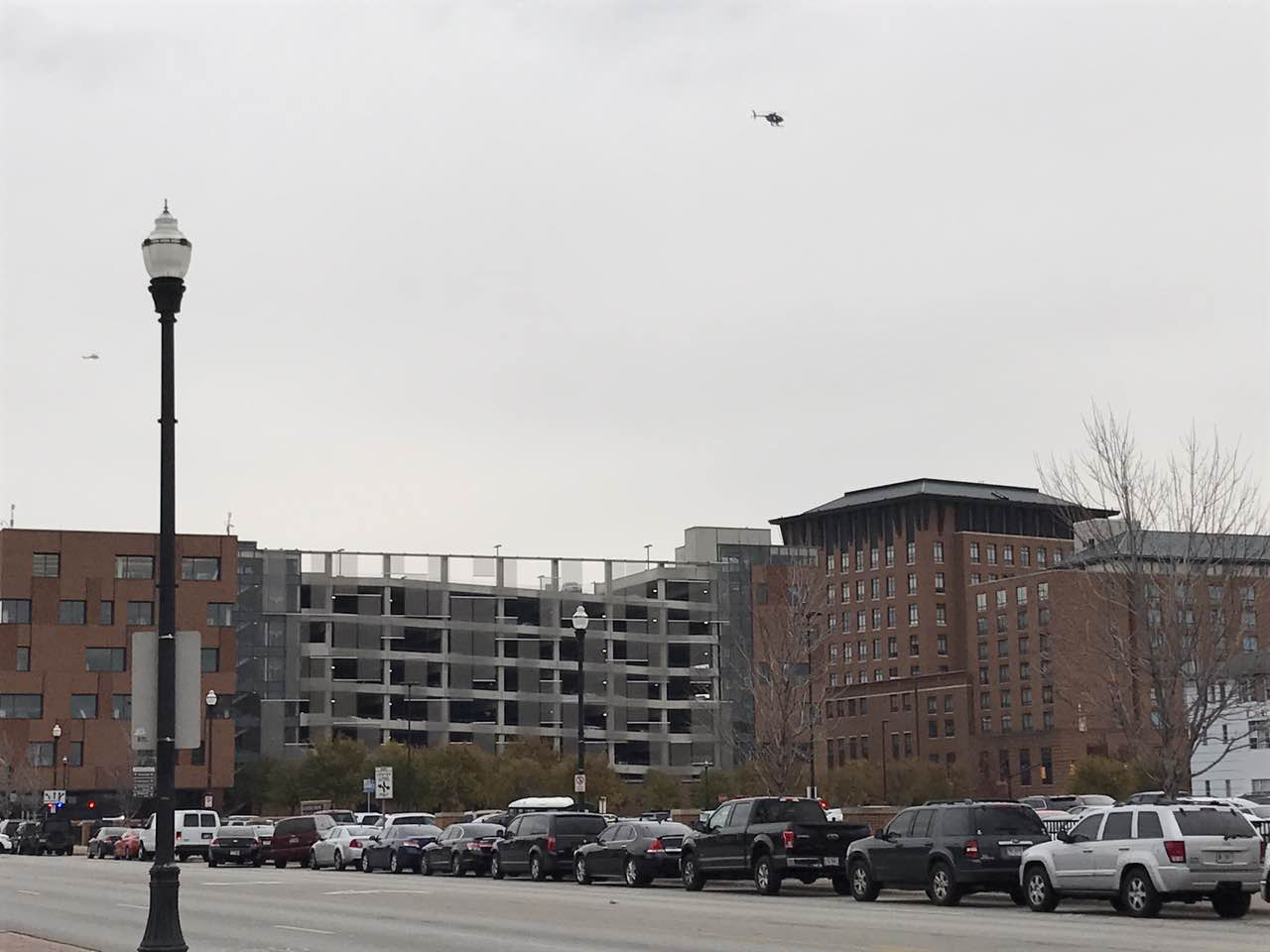
Helicopters circling over the Lane Ave Garage

Eleven of the injured were treated at area hospitals. Eight of them were sent to OSU Wexner Medical Center, Grant Medical Center, and Riverside Methodist Hospital. None of the injuries were considered life-threatening. Four remained hospitalized the next day.

The first officer to respond to the scene of the attack was Alan Horujko, an officer with the OSU Division of Police who happened to be nearby because of a reported gas leak. Horujko shot and killed the assailant within a minute after the attack started. The Columbus Division of Police, Franklin County Sheriff's Office and the Ohio State Highway Patrol dispatched tactical teams, negotiators, a K-9 unit, and additional officers to assist campus police. In addition, a Columbus Division of Fire bomb squad was dispatched to the scene and arrived at 10:06 a.m. The FBI's Cincinnati office announced that its agents were assisting campus police in the investigation. Agents from the local Bureau of Alcohol, Tobacco, Firearms and Explosives (ATF) unit were also dispatched to the scene of the attack.

Upper Arlington and Grandview schools were locked down for a short time while police investigated the incident. The Ohio Department of Transportation temporarily closed ramp access to and from Route 315 at Lane Avenue and Medical Center Drive.

== Perpetrator ==
Abdul Razak Ali Artan (1998 – November 28, 2016) was a Muslim Somali refugee and legal permanent resident of the United States who had been a logistics management major in the Max M. Fisher College of Business at the time of the attack. Though OSU said Artan was 18, investigators said some records conflicted and investigators believed he may have been older.

Artan was the third-eldest of seven children. He said that he was born in a refugee camp after his family fled Somalia. However, a senior U.S. government official said that Artan left Somalia with the rest of his family in 2007, and that they spent seven years in a refugee camp in Pakistan, settling in Islamabad on a road known as "Somali Street". He moved to the U.S. on a refugee visa with his mother and six siblings in 2014.

The Franklin County Coroner's Office, conducting a preliminary autopsy report on Artan's body, determined that he died from gunshot wounds to the head and chest.

=== Life in the United States ===
Artan and his family first settled in a temporary shelter in Dallas, Texas, for approximately 24 days before relocating to Columbus. They lived together in four units of an apartment at the Havenwood Townhomes complex on the West Side. He was described by neighbors as a consistently polite man who always "attended daily prayer services at a mosque" in Columbus. Friends in Ohio and Pakistan described him as a "studious, devout young man who 'loved America'" and "did not have any extremist tendencies". He and his family did not appear to be familiar figures at local mosques and in Somali community groups, according to leaders there. According to a police report, before settling into Havenwood Townhomes, Artan and his family contacted police in 2014 after an animal heart was left on the hood of a relative's car.

Artan previously attended Columbus State Community College from the fall of 2014 to the summer of 2016, and graduated cum laude with an Associate of Arts degree, after which he transferred to OSU. He had no disciplinary record at Columbus State, and was described as "very normal" and talking about Islam frequently by his classmates there. At the time of the attack, he was enrolled in fourteen-and-a-half credit hours for the semester. Artan had worked at a Home Depot in Columbus for less than a year.

In August, on his first day at OSU, Artan was interviewed by The Lantern, the school newspaper. In the interview, he said that he was having trouble finding a place to pray in comparison to his old school at Columbus State, which provided private prayer rooms. However, he was apparently unaware of a prayer space provided in the OSU student union. Artan added that he was scared about other people's opinions of him because of what he perceived to be negative portrayal of Muslims in the media, and criticized the then Presidential candidate Donald Trump for not being "educated on Islam". In the interview, Artan expressed fear about Donald Trump's rhetoric toward Muslims, and what it might mean for immigrants and refugees.

== Investigation ==
The FBI's Joint Terrorism Task Force and the ATF became involved in the investigation.

Per university policy, Alan Horujko, the campus officer who shot and killed Artan, was placed on administrative leave. Columbus police began investigating the officer-involved shooting.

Though two people were taken into custody in the immediate aftermath of the attack, Artan was ultimately believed by police to have acted alone. His apartment was searched by the FBI and a Franklin County Sheriff's Office bomb squad.

On November 30, the FBI appealed to the public for assistance in filling in an unaccounted time gap between Artan's purchase of a knife on the morning of the attack and the attack itself.

=== Terrorism classification ===
The FBI began a search into Artan's digital history to see if he had contact with suspected terrorists or had access to terrorist propaganda. Artan had not been known to the FBI as a potential threat prior to the attack.

In the hours after the attack, the FBI focused on a Facebook post that, according to CNN, was written by Artan minutes before the attack. According CBS News, the Facebook post suggests "he was disturbed by how Muslims were being treated everywhere" and appears to be concerned with the violence and persecution of Muslims in Myanmar. In that same post, Artan also "criticized the United States for interfering in other countries". A senior FBI official said that investigators were working to verify the authenticity of the posts. The full statement has been released by police and published.

On the day after the attack, two law enforcement sources confirmed investigators' beliefs that Artan was inspired by terrorist propaganda from ISIL and al-Awlaki, citing Artan's Facebook post and the method used to carry out the attack. At the time, the sources added that Artan had not been found to have any communication with terror groups, and that the attack appeared to be an act of a lone wolf. These sources were confirmed by an FBI official on November 30. Other law enforcement officials said that Artan may have been motivated by exposure to a "mix of radical messages" from both ISIL and Al-Qaeda, much like the perpetrators of the San Bernardino attack in December 2015, and the September 2016 bombings and bombing attempts in New York and New Jersey. On November 30, a senior official of the FBI's Cincinnati division claimed it was "too early to speculate on the extent of" Artan's involvement with ISIL.

Despite ISIL's claim of responsibility for the attack (see below), it was reported that no evidence has emerged to suggest the terrorist organization's foreknowledge of the event.

On June 1, 2017, investigators announced that Artan left a torn-up note to his parents in which he pledged his allegiance to ISIL, asked his family to stop being moderate, and said he was upset by the persecution of Muslims in Myanmar.

On November 28, 2017, the FBI announced that its substantive federal investigation had ended. It concluded that the perpetrator "had acted alone", that he "was not directed by a terrorist organization", and that the perpetrator "appeared to have been influenced by extremist ideology", including ISIS propaganda.

== Reactions ==
=== University reaction ===
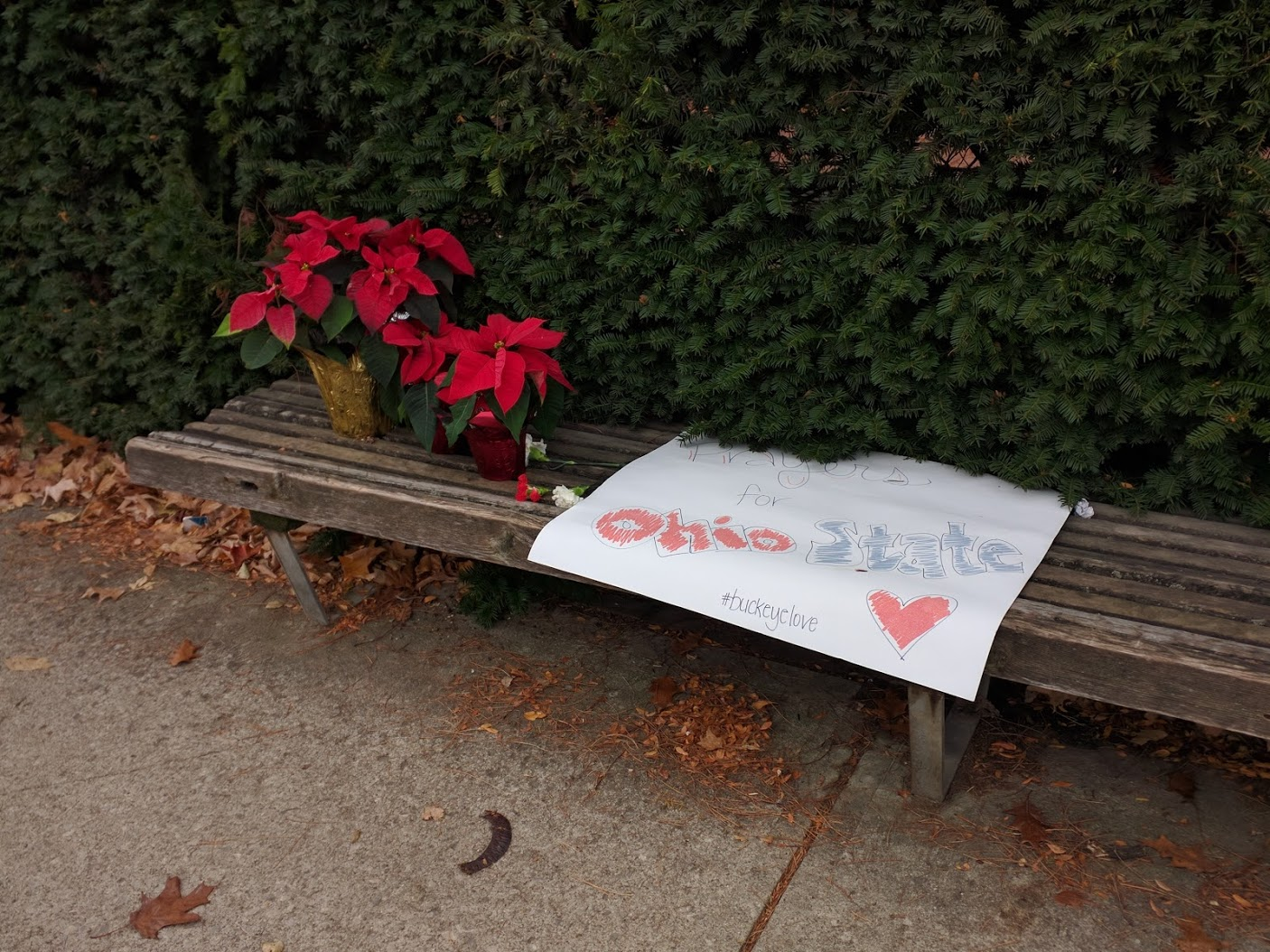
Poinsettias and a sign left outside of Watts Hall in dedication of the attack

Soon after the attack, OSU tweeted that all classes would be canceled for the rest of November 28. In a press conference held sometime after, OSU President Michael V. Drake said that he met with Alan Horujko and thanked him for "following his training and being able to neutralize the circumstance within roughly one minute". He also credited the school's active shooter training and campus alert system for maintaining order while police secured the scene. When asked if the attack had anything to do with terrorism or Ohio's Somali-American community, Drake cautioned against "jumping to conclusions", citing a lack of evidence at the time.

At around 10:00 p.m. on November 28, OSU students and employees gathered in front of a church located near the scene of the attack, to pray for the injured. On November 30, two days after the attack, more than 500 students, employees, and community members attended the "#BuckeyeStrong" event at St. John Arena. Drake spoke at the event, praising the heroic acts of the school community in the immediate aftermath of the attack, as well as the work of the first responders.

On December 1, Stephanie Clemons Thompson, assistant director of student life at OSU, made a Facebook post calling for compassion to be directed at Artan and hashtagging #BuckeyeStrong #BlackLivesMatter #SayHisName. The post received condemnation on social media for defending a person who attempted to kill others, for implying that Artan's death was wrong, and for comparing a terrorist who targeted his fellow students with victims of police brutality. A Change.org petition calling for Thompson's termination from OSU received over 1,200 signatures. An OSU spokesman said that the post "clearly is not an official statement of the university and represents her own personal viewpoint." Some people have defended Thompson for writing the post.

=== Politicians ===
Governor John Kasich tweeted his condolences to the school community and urged people to "listen to first responders". He later praised the "professional, coordinated response" of first responders in another official statement. Mayor Andrew Ginther said that he met with several of the injured, and also declared the city's solidarity with OSU and praised the actions of Alan Horujko and other law enforcement officers. President Barack Obama was briefed on the attack.

Vice President-elect Mike Pence called the attack "tragic" and expressed his condolences. In a Facebook post, then-President-elect Donald Trump thanked the first responders present at the scene of the attack for "react[ing] immediately and eliminat[ing] the threat on campus". He later tweeted that Artan "should not have been in our country".

=== Muslim and Somali-American reaction ===
The attack was condemned by several leaders of Muslim organizations and mosques in the Columbus and Greater Detroit area. Imad Hamad, executive director of the American Human Rights Council, released a statement denouncing the assault and cautioned against scapegoating the wider Muslim community. Omar Hassan, president of the Somali Community Association of Ohio, likewise expressed shock at the attack, and asserted that the community put a great amount of effort into preventing radicalization. The leader of the mosque that Artan frequented also indicated that while he was not familiar with him, the mosque had numerous programs dedicated to helping youth and preventing self-radicalization.

=== After-effects ===
Colleges across the U.S. began revisiting their emergency response plans as a result of the attack.

The attack prompted calls to allow firearms on campuses in Ohio. State Representative Ron Maag made a proposal for the expansion of "concealed carry locations". The proposal downgraded the felony charge of illegally bringing a gun on campus to a misdemeanor, and gave universities the option to allow concealed firearms on their campuses. The proposal was met with a mixed response, with proponents saying that students would feel safer with access to concealed firearms, and opponents arguing that the expansion of concealed carry locations is unnecessary and could even complicate law enforcement response.

Following the OSU attack and a mass shooting at a gay nightclub in Orlando, Florida, in which at least one victim bled to death, a new federal initiative was launched. It was designed to train people working at schools and other public places on how to treat injuries before paramedics arrive at the scene. Doctors have emphasized the importance for school faculty members to stay calm and assess injuries, but also discouraged the use of more invasive emergency procedures such as removing a bullet.

=== ISIL claim of responsibility ===
Amaq News Agency, a purported ISIL mouthpiece, released a statement calling Artan a "soldier of the Islamic State" who "carried out the operation in response to calls to target citizens of international coalition countries".

== See also ==
- Jihadist extremism in the United States

=== Similar attacks ===
- 2006 UNC SUV attack, car ramming attack at a university
- 2011 Tel Aviv nightclub attack, attack at an Israeli nightclub with identical modus operandi
- 2014 Alon Shvut stabbing attack, attack at an Israeli station with identical modus operandi
- 2015 University of California, Merced stabbing attack, stabbing attack at a university

=== Lists of attacks ===
- List of Islamist terrorist attacks
- List of terrorist incidents in November 2016
- Terrorism in the United States
- List of knife attacks by Islamic extremists
