= List of knife attacks by Islamic extremists =

This is a list of knife attacks by Islamic extremists carried out by individuals or organizations against civilian populations or against military personnel not stationed in conflict zones. This list includes attacks where an edged melee weapon was used by Islamic extremists.

- The perpetrator(s) are not included in the death tolls noted in this list.

== 2000s ==
Location	Date	Description	Deaths	Injuries
Netherlands	2 November 2004	Theo Van Gogh was shot, stabbed, and nearly beheaded on his way to work by Mohammed Bouyeri.	1	2
Totals:			1	2

== 2010s ==
Location	Date	Description	Deaths	Injuries
China	30 July 2011	An attack on Kashgar that spanned two days, in which Islamic extremists hijacked a truck, drove it into a crowd of people. They then got out of the truck and began to stab people.	14	42
Israel	29 August 2011	The 2011 Tel Aviv nightclub attack was a combined vehicular assault and stabbing attack.	0	8
Bangladesh	15 February 2013	Ahmed Rajib Haider was murdered by five members of the extremist organization Ansarullah Bangla Team.	1	0
United Kingdom	22 May 2013	Lee Rigby soldier of the British Royal Regiment of Fusiliers, was run down with a car by two Islamic extremists, who then used knives and a cleaver to stab and hack him to death, claiming to be avenging the killing of Muslims by the British armed forces.	1	0
France	25 May 2013	2013 La Défense attack Private first class Cédric Cordier was patrolling a busy underground hall in La Défense in uniform with two other servicemen when an Islamic radical approached Cordier from behind and attacked him with a knife.	0	1
Australia	23 September 2014	Numan Haider stabbed two counter-terrorism officers. Haider planned to behead Victoria Police officers, and drape their bodies in the IS flag.	0	2
Jerusalem	10 November 2014	The 2014 Alon Shvut stabbing attack was a combined vehicular assault and stabbing attack.	1	2
United Arab Emirates	1 December 2014	A burqa-clad woman stabs a 47-year-old American teacher to death in a mall restroom in Abu Dhabi She later plants a bomb outside the home of an Egyptian-American doctor.	1	0
France	20 December 2014	A man entered a police station in Tours, France shouting the Islamic takbir Allahu Akbar ("God is Great"), and proceeded to attack officers with a knife, injuring three before he was shot and killed.	0	3
Germany	17 September 2015	Rafik Y attacked and injured a police officer with a knife in Berlin.	0	1
Israel	19 November 2015	An assailant approached the entrance of a Tel Aviv synagogue at prayer time, and stabbed and killed two worshipers.	2	1
United Kingdom	5 December 2015	2015 Leytonstone tube station attack suspect was reported to have declared, "This is for Syria, my Muslim brothers."	0	3
United States	11 February 2016	In the 2016 Ohio restaurant machete attack, green card holder Mohamed Barry entered a restaurant owned by aan Israeli Christian and attacked people with a machete; lunging at police who gave chase with two knives while shouting "Allahu Akbar!"before he was shot and killed.	0	4
France	7 January 2016	In the Paris police station attack, asylum seeker Tarek Belgacem attacked police officers with a meat cleaver while shouting "Allahu Akbar!" before he was shot and killed.	0	0
Canada	14 March 2016	Montreal born, 27-year-old Ayanle Hassan Ali, stabbed several personnel inside a military recruitment Center in Toronto while shouting "Allah told me to do this. Allah told me to come here and kill people." He has been judged mentally fit to stand trial.	0	2 badly wounded, others hurt
UK	24 March 2016	Tanveer Ahmed shouted "Allahu Akbar" as he stabbed his victim in the Murder of Asad Shah	1	0
France	13 June 2016	A convicted jihadi cried "Allahu Akbar" and stabbed to death a policeman outside his home. Then he entered and slit the policeman's wife throat.	2	0
Germany	18 July 2016	An asylum seeker from Pakistan, who claimed to be an unaccompanied minor from Afghanistan, injured four people, two critically, with a knife and hatchet on a train	0	5
France	26 July 2016	Two Islamist terrorists attacked participants in a Mass at a Catholic church. Wielding knives and wearing fake explosive belts, the men took six people captive and later killed one of them.	1	1
United States	17 September 2016	In the St. Cloud, Minnesota mall stabbing, the perpetrator shouted "Allahu Akbar"	0	1 0
United States	28 November 2016	Ohio State University attack	0	11
Totals:			24	85

== 2020s ==
Location	Date	Description	Deaths	Injuries
Germany	23 August 2024	2024 Solingen stabbing. During a festival celebrating the 650th anniversary of Solingen, Germany, a Syrian man armed with a knife killed three people and injured eight others. The Islamic State claimed responsibility for the attack.	3	8
Totals:			3	8

== See also ==
- Stabbing as a terrorist tactic
