= Pakistan–Somalia relations =

- Pakistan: Somalia

Pakistan–Somalia relations are the bilateral relations between Pakistan and Somalia. Both Organisation of Islamic Cooperation members, the two countries have historically maintained strong relations. Somalia has an embassy in Islamabad.

== History ==
Relations between the modern-day territories of Pakistan and Somalia stretch back to antiquity. The 1st century CE Periplus of the Erythraean Sea, among other documents, reports early commercial exchanges between traders inhabiting the various Somali city-states and merchants from South Asia, across the Arabian Sea. Numerous artefacts dating from this period have been uncovered in Somalia. During the 7th and 8th centuries, parts of Pakistan and Somalia came under the influence of the Umayyad and Abbasid Muslim caliphates. The expansion of the British Empire in the 19th century led to parts of modern Pakistan coming under the British Raj, while the Somaliland region became a protectorate under British Somaliland.

Diplomatic relations between the two countries post-independence were officially established on 18 December 1960, shortly after the formation of the Somali Republic. In 1969, Pakistan and Somalia were among the founding members of the Organisation of Islamic Cooperation (OIC). Somalia's relations with Pakistan remained strong in the following years and through the ensuing civil war period, when the Pakistani military contributed to a UN peacekeeping operation in southern Somalia. In 2010, Pakistan tabled a proposal for United Nations Security Council seats for OIC and Arab League states, the latter of which Somalia is also a member.

The Federal Government of Somalia was later established on August 20, 2012, representing the first permanent central government in the country since the start of the conflict. The development was welcomed by the Pakistani authorities, who re-affirmed Pakistan's continued support for Somalia's government, its territorial integrity and sovereignty, as outlined in the Islamabad Declaration adopted by the Islamic Conference of Foreign Ministers (ICFM).

== Timeline of military relations ==
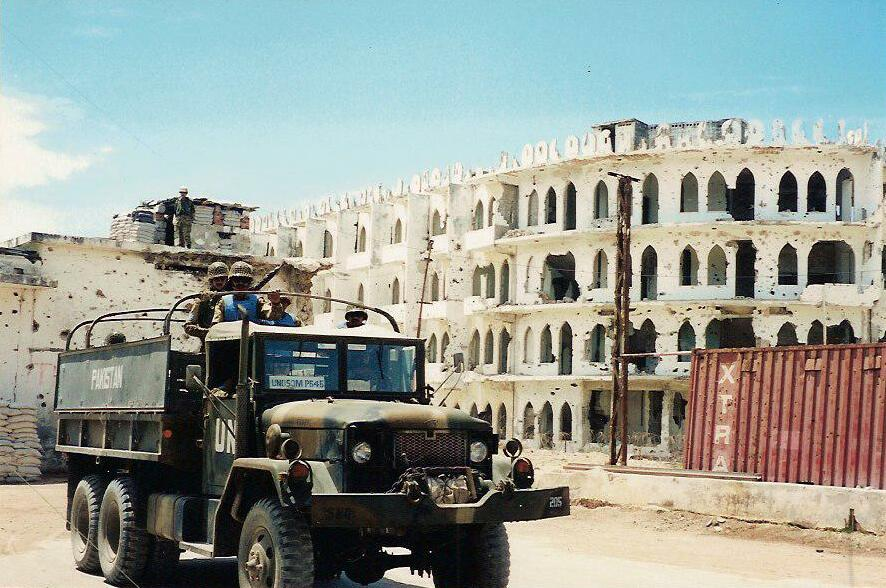
A Pakistani armed convoy in Mogadishu, during the UNOSOM II peacekeeping operations.

- 1990 - During the Somali civil war, up to 5,700 Pakistani troops are deployed for UN peacekeeping.
- 1993 - A Pakistani task force is attacked while, as part of an expanded UN mandate, investigating an arms cache belonging to Mohamed Farrah Aidid, a Somali warlord vying for the Presidency. The attack, believed to have been launched by pro-Aidad militia, inflicted 24 fatalities and led to United Nations Security Council Resolution 837, reaffirming the UN's commitment to peacekeeping and action against the rebels involved.
- 2007 - Al Shabaab insurgency begins, and it ends up causing thousands of deaths, targeting military & civilians.
- 2020 - Somali & Pakistani Air Forces sign agreements for training Somali airmen & officers.
- 20 February 2025 - Somali army & allied militias repel al Shabaab attacks linked to al-Qaeda, killing over 130 militants.
- 2 March 2025 - Somali National Army and international partners kill over 40 al Shabaab militants in Biya Cadde, Hirshabelle state, Somali National Television reported.
- December 2025 - Al Shabaab militants attack four villages in Middle Shabelle, briefly capturing two before retreating.
- 23 January 2026 - Somali interior minister Ali Yusuf meets Pakistani counterpart Mohsin Naqvi, with the two countries reaching an agreement to further cooperation in matters of internal security.
- 6 August 2026 - Somali foreign minister Ahmed Moalim Fiqi visits the General Headquarters in Rawalpindi to meet Asim Munir. Discussions on "matters of mutual interest, regional security dynamics, and measures to further enhance bilateral defence and security cooperation" take place, with Munir promising support for Somalia's security sector.

== Trade ==
Pakistan and Somalia are active commercial partners, trading a variety of commodities. In 2008–2009, Somalia exported $34,822.059 million USD worth of goods to Pakistan, with Pakistan in return exporting $17,781.883 million USD worth of goods to Somalia. Somalia's main export commodities to Pakistan centered on the country's livestock sector, and in 2009 included $3.190 million in raw hides and skins, $1.044 million in raw sheep and lamb skins, $0.137 million in sheep/lamb skin leather, $0.225 million in raw hides and skins of bovine/equine animals, and $0.033 million in leather of bovine/equine animals. Pakistan's exports to Somalia during the same year included $53.254 million in rice, $0.627 million in medicament mixtures, $10.400 million in non-cocoa sugar confectionery, and $0.20 million in shawls, scarves, mufflers, mantillas and similar garments.

Following a meeting between representatives of Somalia's Trade Ministry and the Islamabad Chamber of Commerce and Industry, the two countries agreed to enhance their commercial relations, particularly in the agriculture, food products, livestock, fish farming, textiles, pharmaceutical products, leather products, hides and cement sectors. Most of the trade between Somalia and Pakistan had hitherto been conducted through Dubai, so the Somali authorities sought to establish direct trade links with Pakistan. According to Somalia's former Trade Minister Abdi Rashid Mohamed Abdi, Somalia wanted to purchase products that it had been importing from elsewhere directly from Pakistan. He also highlighted Somalia's commercial potential given its strategic location and its position as a gateway to African markets, and suggested that Pakistan could capture large parts of Somalia's markets were it to supply quality products at competitive prices.

== Immigration ==
As of late 2012, there is a small community of around 2,500 Somalis in Pakistan. Most are international students, with a few secondary migrants also present. Additionally, there was a very small community of Pakistanis in Somalia. They were mainly involved in retail business in urban areas.

In January 2026, Pakistani interior minister Mohsin Naqvi announced visa facilitation for Somalis travelling to Pakistan for medical and educational purposes.

== Diplomatic missions ==
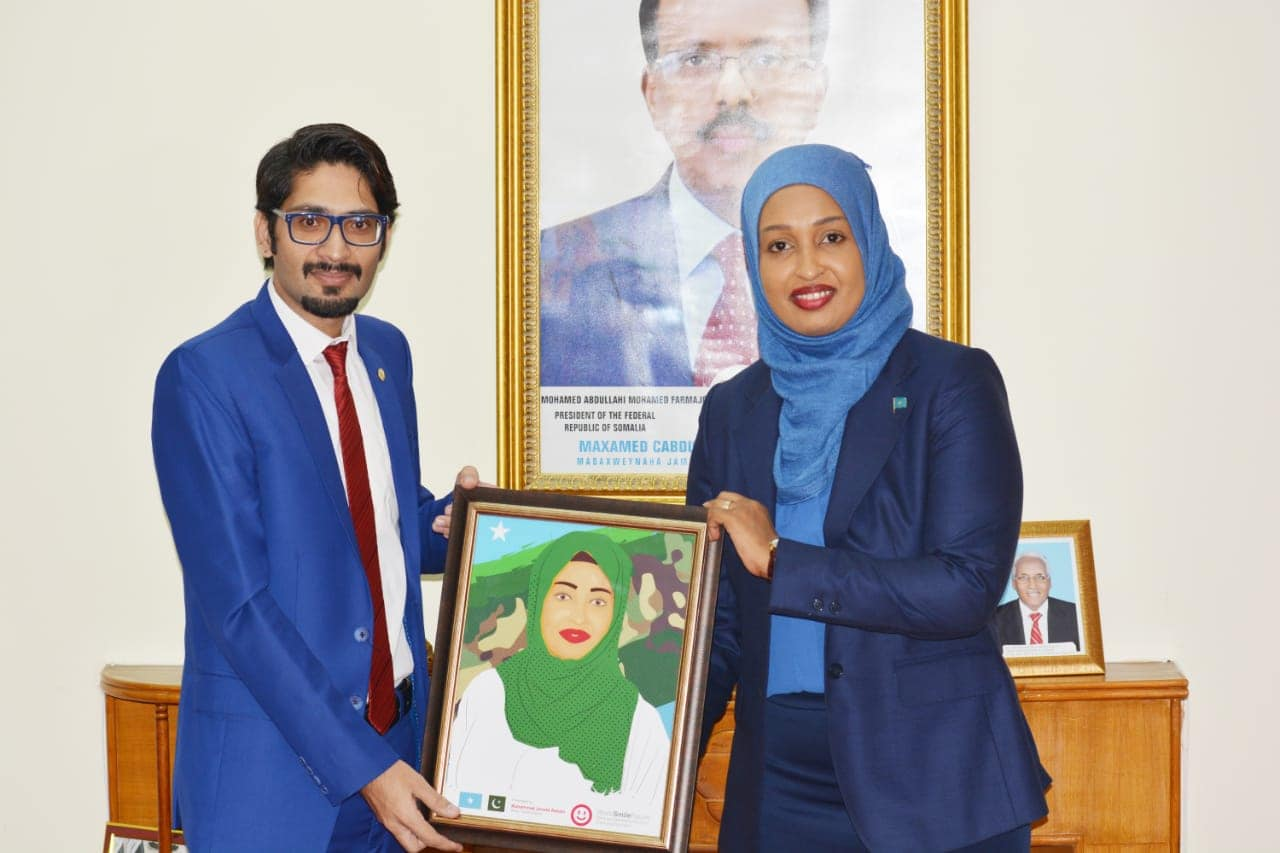
Mr. Junaid Abbasi founder World Smile Forum and an artist by profession presented Digital portrait of H.E.Mrs Khadija Mohamed Almakhzumi to her with artistic concept of Somalia, Pakistan flag colors and Pak Army texture in background representing Pakistan contribution in Somali for peace as Peacekeeping Mission and symbol of friendship from World Smile Forum. Which she received delightfully and thanked Mr. Junaid for Beautiful portrait.

Somalia maintains an embassy in Islamabad which was established in 1976. The diplomatic mission is led by Ambassador Khadija Mohamed Almakhzoumi. H.E. Mrs. Khadija Mohamed Almakhzoumi, Ambassador of the Federal Republic of Somalia to Pakistan, Presented her credentials to H.E. Mr. Mamnoon Hussain, President of the Islamic Republic of Pakistan, on July 14, 2016. Before her arrival to Pakistan, Ambassador Khadija was a counselor in Somali Embassy Malaysia from February 2011 to June 2011 and senior political Advisor to Minister of Foreign Affairs Somalia from September 2011 to January 2013. She served as the Somali Ambassador to Iraq from February 2013 to April 2016. Ambassador Khadija earned post graduate degree in International Relations from Middlesex University, London UK. It also has an honorary consulate in Karachi. Pakistan previously had an embassy in Mogadishu, which was established in 1973.

== See also ==
- Foreign relations of Pakistan
- Foreign relations of Somalia
