= Ronen Maili =

Israeli producer, businessman

- רונן מיילי
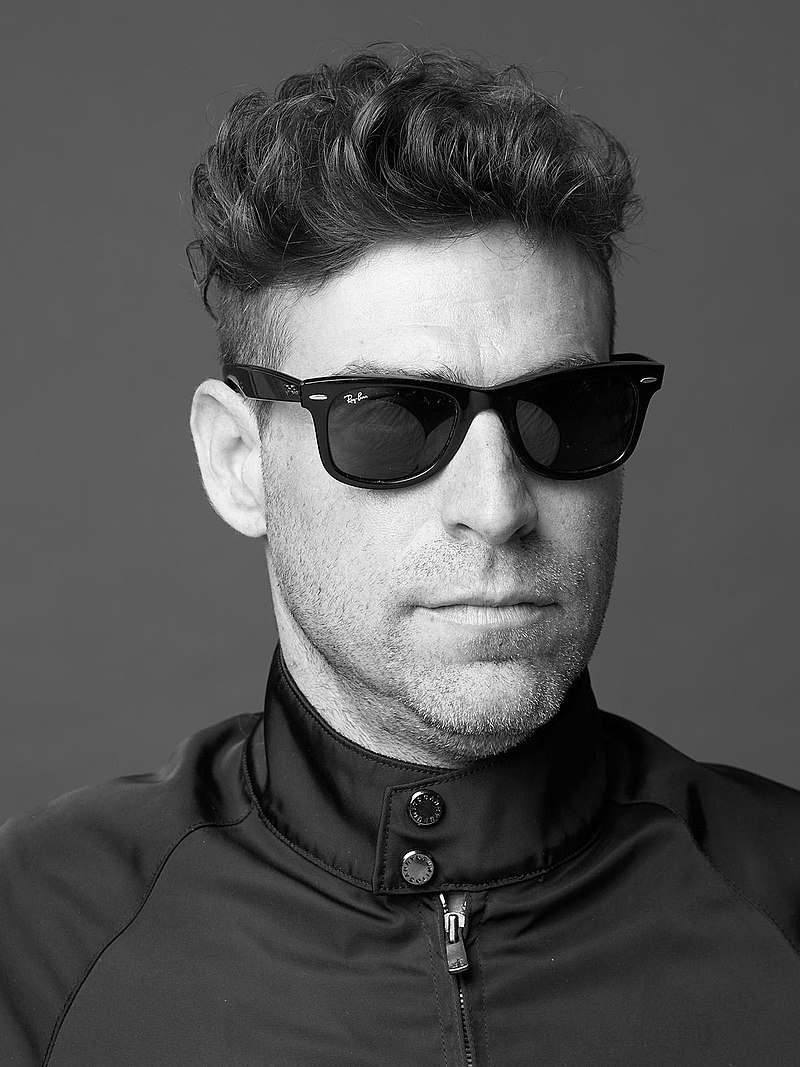
- Born: Bnei Brak, Israel
- Occupations: Producer, businessman, socialite

Ronen Maili (Hebrew: רונן מיילי) is an Israeli producer, businessman and socialite, and the chair of the Israeli Bar and Club Association.

== Biography ==
Maili was born and raised in Bnei Brak. He completed his military service in the Duvdevan Unit and following his discharge completed a manager's course in Tel Aviv University.

He began his way in the Tel Aviv nightlife scene at the end of the 1990s as public relations manager of various clubs, including "The Lemon" and the "Honey Dynamo" and, later, the T.L.V.

In 2005, he replaced Reuben Lublin, founder of the Haoman 17 Jerusalem club, as CEO of the club that relocated its position to Tel Aviv. Maili served in this position for four years.

From 2008 to the present day, Maili founded a number of clubs in Tel Aviv: "The Cat and the Dog", "Merhav Yarkon", "Sex Boutique", "Weiss Bar", "the Shushu Club", and the "Metzizim Beach Bar".

In 2010, as part of his activity in the field of Tel- Aviv nightlife, he organized 120 business owners and founded the Bar and Club Association of Israel, which he has chaired ever since.

Over the years, Maili has produced massive parties in various Israeli cities, and amongst his better known productions are the Purim Rave in the Tel Aviv State Square (Kikar Hamedina) in the years 2014 – 2017, and the Tel Aviv Museum Square in the years 2010 – 2015, the "Independence Park (Park Atzmaut) Musical" productions in Tel- Aviv in the years 2016 – 2017, street parties in Rothschild Avenues in Tel- Aviv in the years 2011 – 2015 and the white night events in Ashkelon in the year 2014.

In 2014, he was also a partner in the production of two international pop concerts- Justin Timberlake and Lady Gaga- who performed in Tel- Aviv. He was also a partner in the production of the performance of the singer Lana Del Rey that was eventually canceled due to the Protective Edge operation (Tzuk Eitan/ 2014 Israel- Gaza war).

In 2017, Maili participated in the "Restart" program on channel 10 that seeks to assist people to wean themselves off an unhealthy lifestyle and return them to a normative and sound life path.

== Public activity ==
Maili has served, since 2010, as Chairman of the Israel Bar and Club Association, which he founded to assist business owners in the field of Israel's nightlife. In this framework, he represents over 120 clubs and bars, and acts to settle and regularize ordinances and legislation on matters such as club crowding, prohibition on smoking, club entrant selection and the unique security needs of nighttime businesses.

As part of his activities in this framework, Mally has initiated, and was a partner in framing the ethical code of running clubs and bars, together with professor Asa Kasher, which primarily deals with the management of nighttime active businesses.

Maili initiated collaboration with the "Green light (Or Yarok)" nonprofit, primarily regarding the struggle against drunk driving, and was amongst the activists promoting the law forbidding the sale of alcohol after 23:00, as well as the collaboration with the Israel Police regarding false complaints of partygoers in clubs.

As part of his municipal activism in Tel Aviv, Maili also participated in the setup of annual conferences regarding business registration benefiting the clubs and bars of the city, and is active in the "City Majority (Rov Ha’Ir)" faction to promote such issues as: internal tourism, welfare and the rights of students in the city, night life, culture and assistance to small businesses.

Maili is a member of the tourism panel and the small and medium business panel in the Tel- Aviv Jaffe municipal government. He is also a member of the Ir Olam v’Tayarut (City of the World and Tourism) management and a member of the businesses licensing committee of the Tel Aviv municipal government. Maili is also a member of the management committee of the Duvdevan Unit nonprofit, the military unit in which h e served.
