= 2011 Nakba Day =

Annual commemoration event tragedy

The 2011 Nakba Day was the annual day of commemoration for the Palestinian people marking the Nakba—their forced displacement that accompanied the creation of Israel in 1948. Generally held on May 15, commemorative events in 2011 began on May 10, in the form of march by Palestinian Arab citizens of Israel on Israel's Independence Day. On May 13, clashes between stone-throwing youths and Israeli security forces in East Jerusalem resulted in one Palestinian fatality, and clashes continued there and in parts of the West Bank in the days following.

In an unprecedented development on May 15, thousands of people, mostly Palestinian refugees from Lebanon, the West Bank, Gaza Strip and Syria, marched towards the ceasefire borders with Israel. Fifteen Palestinians were killed and hundreds wounded, most by live ammunition as the Israeli Defense Forces tried to hold them back across the line. Dozens of Israelis were also injured. More than a hundred protestors from Syria managed to breach the fence and enter the Israeli-occupied Golan Heights, and at least one made it all the way to Tel Aviv.

Attempts by march organizers in Egypt and Jordan to reach their countries' borders with Gaza and Israel, respectively, were largely thwarted by domestic security forces. At a mass demonstration outside the Israeli Embassy in Cairo, the Egyptian Army used tear gas and live fire to disperse the crowd, wounding 353. In other events in Tel Aviv, an Israeli man was killed and others wounded by an Arab truck driver who claimed he lost control of his vehicle, but is suspected by Israeli police of having purposefully carried out a "terrorist attack".

Organized by calls put out by Palestinians on Facebook, the border marches were given impetus by the revolutions and uprisings taking place in the Arab world. The American and Israeli governments said the marches were coordinated by the Iranian and the Syrian governments to shift public attention from domestic unrest.

== Background ==
Al-Nakba is the Arabic word for "the catastrophe" or "the disaster" and is used by Palestinians to refer to their forced displacement and flight from Palestine that accompanied the creation of Israel in 1948. More than 700,000 Palestinians were expelled or fled over the course of the 1948 Palestine War and they and their descendants number several million today, divided between Jordan (2 million), Lebanon (427,057), Syria (477,700), the West Bank (788,108) and the Gaza Strip (1.1 million), with another quarter of a million internally displaced Palestinians in Israel.

Nakba Day is commemorated annually, generally on May 15. Commemorations among Palestinian Arab citizens of Israel are often held on Israeli Independence Day which falls on the Hebrew calendar date of 5 Iyar (in 2011, May 10). On that day, several thousand internally displaced Palestinians and their supporters held their 14th annual "March of Return" between al-Damun and al-Ruways, two Palestinian villages depopulated during the 1948 Palestinian expulsion and flight. At least 1,000 Arabs and Jews held the first public commemoration of the Nakba in Jaffa on May 14 to protest the "Nakba Law" passed by the Israeli Knesset in March. Organized by members of youth movements in Jaffa and Lod, Arab Members of Knesset did not attend the protest, where demonstrators chanted pro-Palestinian, pan-Arab, and anti-Israel slogans, and blocked traffic along Jaffa's main street.

In anticipation of Nakba Day events, the Israeli military sealed off the West Bank for 24 hours and deployed IDF regiments and Border Police gendarmes. Inside Israel, police prepared for Arab protests and possible violence, and security forces were deployed in the predominantly Arab Wadi Ara region. A heavy police presence was reported in many of Jerusalem's Arab neighborhoods, and included both regular police officers and Border Police gendarmes.

Israeli forces were provided with riot and crowd-control gear, and were ordered to use live fire only under extreme circumstances. Israel's political leadership instructed the IDF not to take risks and assume major precautions. Soldiers were ordered not to intervene in peaceful demonstrations that did not target soldiers, settlers, or infrastructure. The IDF said that it wanted "zero funerals" during the demonstrations. Senior field officers were deployed in every sector of operations to monitor the situation and assist in the decision-making process. Israeli commanders also monitored internet chatter and social media websites to get a clear sense of the Palestinian street's mood. IDF Brigades were also trained to deal with clashes between Palestinians and settlers.

== Border demonstrations ==
Inspired by the uprisings and revolutions taking place in the Arab world, Palestinians used Facebook to call for mass protests throughout the region on May 15, 2011, Nakba Day. A page calling for a "Third Palestinian Intifada" to begin on May 15 garnered more than 350,000 "likes" before being taken down by Facebook managers at the end of March after complaints from the Israeli government as well as a counter group which repeatedly requested Facebook to block the page on the grounds that it incited violence. The page called for mass marches to Palestine from Egypt, Lebanon, Syria and Jordan to commemorate the Nakba and demand the right of return for all Palestinian refugees.

=== Egypt ===
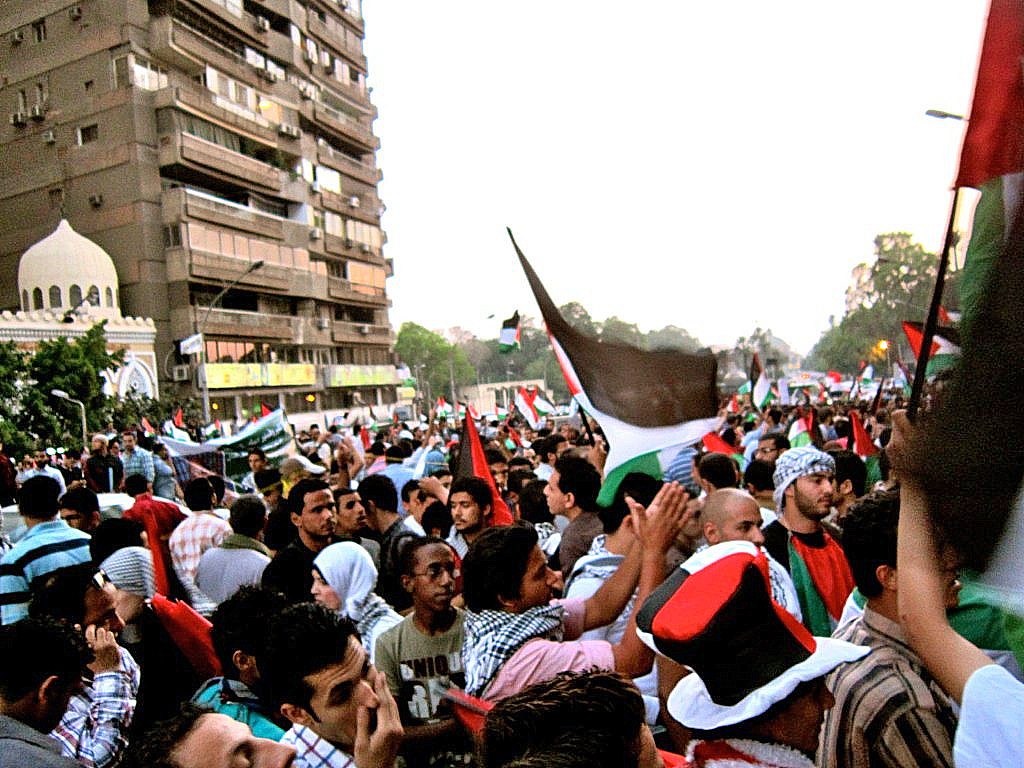
Free Palestine rally in Cairo

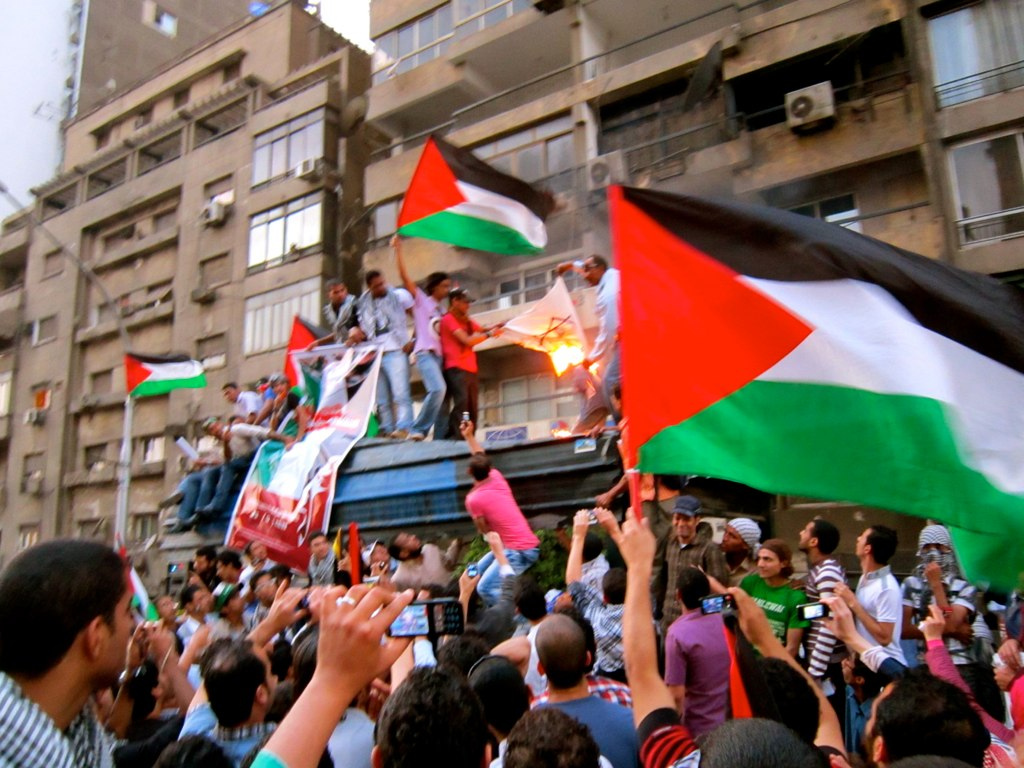
An Egyptian burning an Israeli flag during a Nakba Day protest at the Israeli embassy in Cairo, 2011 May 15

Organizers in Egypt had been preparing for weeks to implement the plans for a mass march to the border. In addition to demanding the right of return for Palestinian refugees, several demands specific to Egypt were added by Cairo organizers, including the opening of the Rafah border on a permanent basis, the release of all Palestinian prisoners in Egyptian jails, and an end to the export of Egyptian gas to Israel and all other "humiliating agreements with the Zionist state".

On the Friday (May 13) before Nakba Day, thousands demonstrated in Cairo's Tahrir Square in solidarity with Palestinians (and Copts). On Saturday, thousands were planning to make their way toward the Rafah crossing with the Gaza Strip in convoys set to depart from Cairo, Alexandria, Suez, Damietta, North Sinai. Gharbiya, Beni Suef, Assiut, Qena and Sohag. However, an order from the Supreme Council of Armed Forces to tourism companies not to send buses to the convoy organizers left them without sufficient transportation and the few buses they did manage to procure were stopped by the army. The blockage of access by Egyptian forces to the Sinai Peninsula, meant that only about 80 activists managed to reach the border with Rafah.

At the Israeli Embassy in Cairo on May 15, thousands gathered for a demonstration. Individuals tried to break into the building, but were dispersed by Egyptian security forces using tear gas and live fire. Some 353 protesters were injured and 180 arrested. At least two of the wounded had been shot in head and chest by Egyptian forces, and at least two of those arrested were well known for their tweets during the 2011 Egyptian revolution.

=== Israel ===
On 15 May, about 25 Arab-Israeli students gathered near Avivim alongside the border with Lebanon to commemorate Nakba Day. Israeli police ordered them to leave the area. A female attorney among the protesters asked why and was slapped by an Israeli police commander. The protesters said they could not leave immediately because they were waiting for their bus to arrive, and that they were attacked by security forces who fired tear gas. Israeli authorities said the group had no permit to protest and that the area had been declared a closed military zone because of the escalating border disturbances. A police statement said when they refused to leave, reasonable force was used to remove them, and eight people were arrested.

=== Jordan ===
In Jordan, 200 Palestinian students attempted to march towards the Israeli border, but were stopped by Jordanian security forces. Six people were injured. They were part of a larger group of 500 who were stopped at the Allenby Bridge. Jordanian authorities said a total of 25 people were injured, including 11 police officers. The political arm of the Muslim Brotherhood in Jordan, the Islamic Action Front, condemned police actions which they described as "shocking" stating: "We condemn the attack, which is part of government policies to impose its will on the people, and we demand an end to such policies that have harmed Jordan's image."

=== Lebanon ===
In Lebanon, activists had organized an event on a mountaintop in the village of Maroun al-Ras that overlooks the border with Israel. Some 30,000 people, including Palestinian refugees from various Palestinian refugee camps across Lebanon attended. After walking up the mountain to the protest site, many decided to descend the opposite side, and continued on towards the border. Lebanese Army soldiers fired into the air in a failed effort to deter them. Crossing through a minefield that was laid by Israel during the 2006 Lebanon War, they reached the border fence, and threw stones over it, chanting for their right of return. Eleven Palestinian refugees were killed and 100 injured by gunfire before the protesters retreated. Media reported that the protesters were shot by the IDF. The IDF said most of those killed were likely shot by the Lebanese Armed Forces (LAF) and that they had a video that established this, but would not release it on the grounds that it might cause embarrassment to the Lebanese Army.

=== Palestinian territories ===
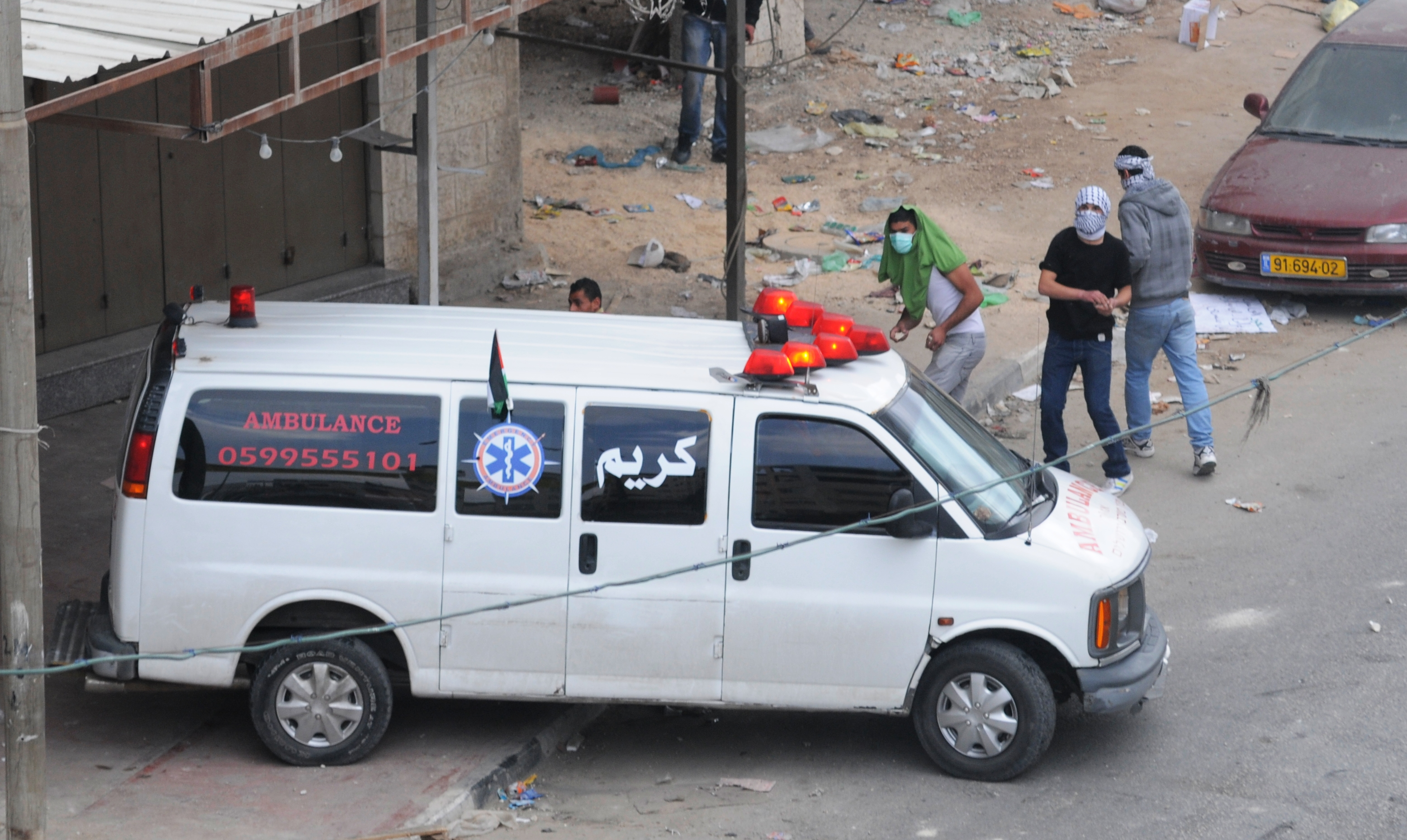
Palestinians throwing rocks while taking cover behind an ambulance at Qalandiya

On 13 May, protests took place throughout the West Bank, primarily at the weekly Friday protests against the separation fence. Near Nabi Salih, dozens of Palestinians, Israeli leftists, and foreign activists clashed with IDF forces who said they were dispersed for throwing stones. Protestors reported 10 injuries. Similar protests took place in Na'alin and Umm Salamuna, south of Bethlehem, where six were arrested and the area sealed off by the IDF. A protest was also held near Bil'in.

Palestinian demonstrators marched on the Qalandia checkpoint on May 15. Organizers had previously convened seminars on strategies for non-violent resistance to prepare for a march on the Qalandia checkpoint on May 15. Several of them were arrested by Palestinian Authority police in the month before the protest date. Representatives from Bi'lin, Nil'in and Nabi Salih, villages known for their grassroots weekly protests against the separation barrier, attended the protest which began at around 10:30am on May 15. More than 1,000 protestors marched through the Qalandia refugee camp until they reached within 100 meters of the checkpoint, where Israeli forces used tear gas to disperse them. A standoff ensued that lasted more than seven hours between Israeli soldiers and around 100 Palestinian protesters who threw stones as Israeli troops fired tear gas and rubber bullets. Israeli undercover officers in plain clothes carrying pistols ran into the crowd from time to time and made arrests. In several incidents, Palestinians took cover behind ambulances while throwing rocks. More than 80 Palestinians, including three paramedics, were injured, and 20 were hospitalized. Dr. Sami Dar Nakhla said the IDF was using a new form of toxic tear gas that caused seizures and unconsciousness, and remarked that the last time he saw so many casualties in one day was during the Second Intifada.

Between 500 and 600 Palestinians marched towards the Erez crossing on the border between Israel and the Gaza Strip. IDF forces fired on the group intermittently over the course of several hours with tanks, machine guns, gas canisters, and sound bombs, killing one demonstrator and wounding more than 80. The IDF said that it fired at the legs of protestors approaching the fence. The wounded included 31 children and 3 journalists who attended the march. A group of youth under the age of 18 who approached the fence were fired upon by a tank, wounding 15. A group of Palestinian women also came to the site to throw stones. Hamas, which governs the territory, reportedly asked protesters to withdraw from the border. In a separate incident, Israeli troops killed 17-year-old Khamis Salah Mesleh Habeeb in the "buffer zone" at the Israel-Gaza Strip border near the Nahal Oz crossing. The IDF said that troops opened fire on a Palestinian man they suspected of placing explosives on the Israel-Gaza Strip border fence near Nahal Oz.

=== Syria ===
In Syria, the demonstrations were organized by phone and Internet by Palestinian refugees, most of them university students independent of any political faction, in response to the call for a "Third Palestinian Intifada" on Facebook. Demonstrators gathered near the Israeli-Syrian ceasefire line waving Palestinian flags. The first wave of demonstrators was stopped by Syrian police, who were later overtaken when a second group arrived. About 1,000 demonstrators approached the fence, and some 300 children among them, rushed toward the fence. Some managed to breach the border and enter the Israeli side of the ceasefire line. The sole Israeli military patrol present was overwhelmed and opened fire on the demonstrators, who threw stones at Israeli troops. Four demonstrators were killed and dozens injured. The dead were Palestinian refugees: Qais Abu Alheija from Houd, Bashar Ali Shahabi from Lubya, Samer Khartabeel from Tiberias, and Abadah Zaghmout from Safsaf. Two demonstrators were arrested and detained, but were returned to Syria. About a dozen Israeli soldiers injured by stone-throwing during the clashes, and suffered mild-to-moderate injuries. Among the injured was the Israeli commander, Colonel Eshkol Shukrun, who was hit in the face.

More than a hundred demonstrators managed to bypass the fence and enter the Arab Druze town of Majdal Shams. Arab residents of the Golan Heights, many of whom still hold Syrian citizenship, had gathered near the fence when they heard shots, and welcomed those who entered Majdal Shams, offering them food and drink. The demonstrators eventually headed back to Syria after negotiations, and police combed the area for any additional infiltrators. At least one demonstrator, Hassan Hijazi, a 28-year-old Palestinian refugee, managed to hitch a ride to central Israel with Israeli and French Arab peace activists, and reached Tel Aviv by bus, even sitting alongside Israeli soldiers. After finding his old family home in Jaffa, he turned himself in at a police station, saying he had fulfilled a lifelong ambition.

== Other Nakba Day events ==
=== Israel and the Palestinian territories ===
On 13 May, Palestinian residents in Jerusalem clashed with Israeli security forces, throwing stones and molotov cocktails. One demonstrator, Milad Sayyid Ayyash, was shot in the Silwan neighborhood either by Israeli security forces or a private security guard, and died in hospital the following day. About 30 demonstrators and four police officers and gendarmes were injured during the clashes, and 70 Palestinians were arrested.

On 14 May, a funeral procession for Milad Sayyid Ayyash passed through Silwan, where some participants threw stones at Jewish homes. Palestinians also threw stones at police and vehicles sporting Israeli flags for independence day throughout east Jerusalem. Five police officers were injured by stone-throwing, and one was hospitalized. Security forces arrested 13 Palestinians. In the Arab-Israeli city of Qalansawe, residents also threw stones at police. At least 1,000 Arabs and Jews from across Israel attended a procession in Jaffa, marching down Jaffa's main street to a park in the Ajami neighborhood, where a rally and concert by Arab-Israeli hip-hop group DAM was held. The demonstrators waved Palestinian flags and signs, and loudly chanted pro-Palestinian, Arab nationalist, and anti-Israel slogans. There was a very small police presence, and no counter-protests. Police blocked traffic from reaching the demonstration. However, a minor incident took place prior to the demonstration when a group of protesters arrived at the promenade in Tel Aviv and left their bus while waving Palestinian flags, prompting passerby to spit on and curse them. The protesters responded with slurs and returned to the bus.

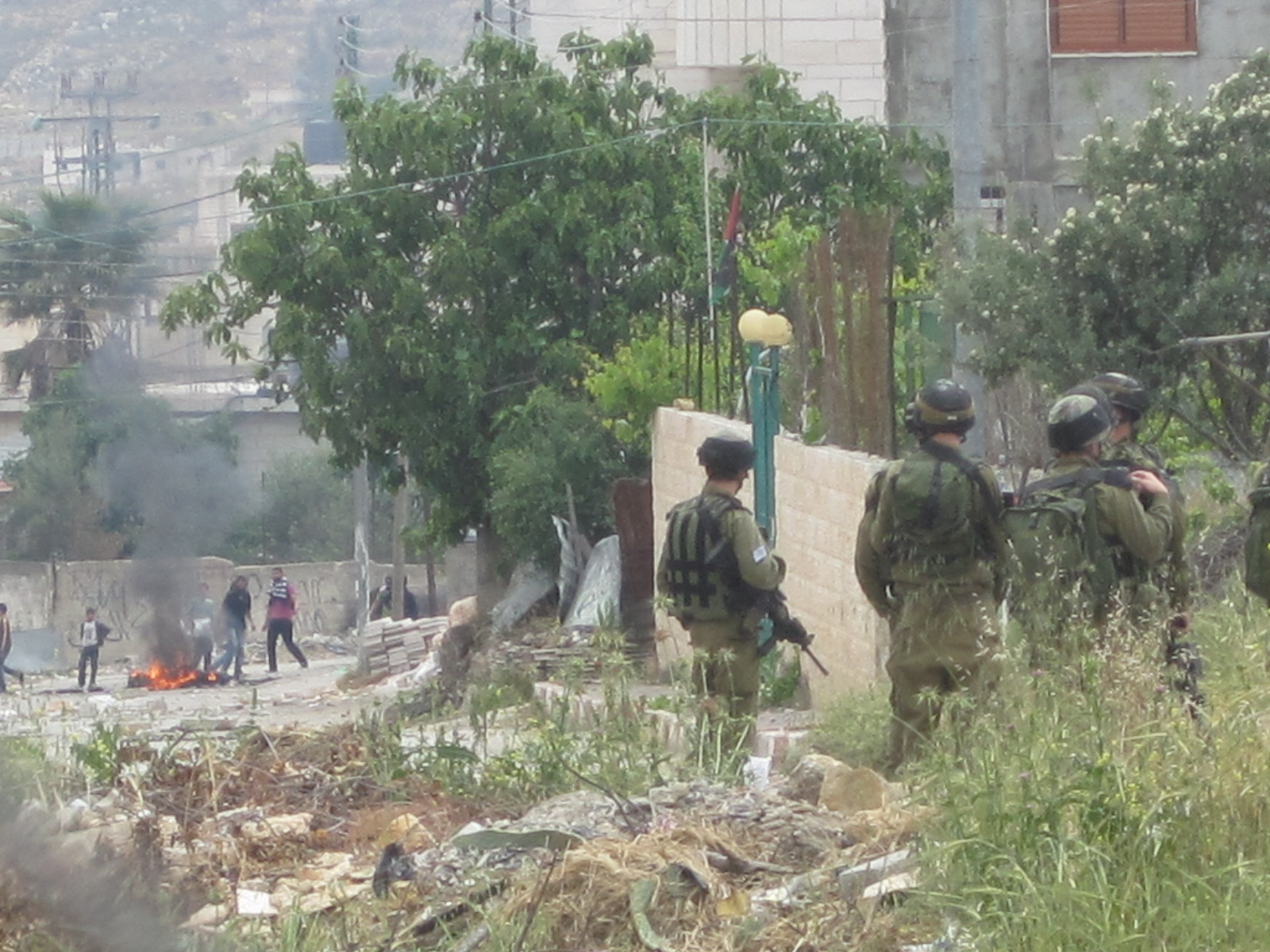
Israeli soldiers and Palestinian demonstrators in Al-Arroub

On May 15, hundreds of Palestinians clashed with IDF and police forces at the Qalandiya checkpoint and throughout Jerusalem, with dozens hurling stones. Four police officers were lightly injured in several incidents. Three molotov cocktails were also thrown at the back gate of Hadassah Hospital at Mount Scopus. Security forces responded with crowd-control measures, and arrested 36 protesters. Several were arrested by undercover officers. Israeli authorities closed off the Old City in Jerusalem to prevent large rallies. Shop owners in the Muslim and Christian Quarters closed down their shops in observance of a strike to commemorate Nakba Day. Three Palestinians were arrested in the Old City after they threatened local business owners to participate in the strike.

At 12pm, a 63-second siren was sounded throughout the West Bank to commemorate 63 years since the Nakba. In Ramallah's Al-Manara Square, a gathering organized by the Palestinian Authority to commemorate Nakba Day was attended by thousands of people who waved Palestinian flags and black flags, burned Israeli flags, and watched concerts. At another rally for thousands staged near the tomb of late Palestinian president Yasser Arafat, the PLO's head of refugees' affairs made a speech vowing the refugees' right of return would not be abandoned by the Palestinian leadership. At the entrance of nearby Birzeit University, Palestinian students burned tires and pelted Israeli soldiers manning the 'Atara checkpoint with stones. Israeli troops responded by firing rubber bullets and tear gas canisters, injuring 30 protesters according to the Palestinian Red Crescent.

About 100 residents of Hebron released 200 black balloons to commemorate the Nakba in the center of the city in a rally organized by Fatah. Israeli forces dispersed the demonstrators. Ten demonstrators were injured, and a further 18 suffered from tear gas inhalation. While the demonstration was taking place, Israeli settlers from Kiryat Arba threw four molotov cocktails at a Hebron home while 30 family members and European observes were inside. In nearby Al-Fawwar refugee camp, Israeli forces clashed with Palestinian protesters, where six suffered from tear gas inhalation. Palestinians also demonstrated near the Israeli settlement bloc of Gush Etzion. Palestinian Authority security forces arrested some demonstrators, while allowing other protests to go unhindered.

Following the events of Nakba Day, Palestinian factions in the West Bank called for a two-hour general strike to mourn demonstrators killed.

=== Tel Aviv truck attack ===
Around 9:30 in the morning, an Israeli man was killed and 17 people were injured when Islam Issa, an Israeli-Arab truck driver from Kafr Qasim, rammed several vehicles along a 2 kilometers (1.2 mi) highway section along Bar-Lev Street in Tel Aviv. The police stated that the truck hit 15 vehicles before crashing into an empty school bus. According to a witness, Issa left the truck, shouting something that may have been "Allahu Akbar" and hitting a young girl in the head with a traffic light. Issa was arrested and indicted. Issa stated that the ramming occurred because of a punctured tire and denied intending to harm anyone.

Issa was tried in the Tel Aviv District Court on one count of murder, six counts of attempted murder, aggravated assault, and endangering human lives. On July 19, 2012, he was found guilty, with the judges ruling unanimously. On November 14, 2012, Issa was sentenced to life imprisonment and an additional 40 years. He was also ordered to pay NIS 258,000 to the family of the man killed, and an additional NIS 230,000 to the rest of the victims. According to The Jerusalem Post, this was one of a small cluster of vehicle-ramming attacks in Israel in this period, including the 2008 Jerusalem bulldozer attack, the 2008 Jerusalem BMW attack and the 2011 Tel Aviv nightclub attack.

== Reactions ==
- Israel stated the demonstrators committed a "serious" incursion, arguing that "Syria is a police state. Demonstrators do not randomly approach the border without the prior approval of the central government", and that the demonstrations were an "Iranian provocation, on both the Syrian and the Lebanese frontiers, to try to exploit the Nakba day commemorations." Israel filed a complaint against Syria and Lebanon to the United Nations, citing violations of its borders with alleged backing from the Syrian authorities.
- Iran urged the United Nations to take "serious and firm action" against "the Zionist regime's recent criminal actions and the killing of the regional countries' people", that the killing of people staging peaceful demonstrations added another "black stain" on the "ignominious record of the Zionist regime", and that it added to Israel's "long list of crimes".
- Lebanon filed a complaint to the United Nations Security Council over the "killing and wounding of civilians", claiming that Israel's actions constituted a "hostile act" and a violation of Lebanese sovereignty and United Nations Resolutions, urging the Security Council to pressure Israel to stop its "hostile and provocative policies against Lebanon" and to "hold it accountable for killing civilians".
- Syria condemned Israel, referring to its actions as "criminal activities". The Syrian Foreign Ministry said that Israel "will have to bear full responsibility" for its actions, calling on the international community to hold Israel responsible, and claiming that the "popular Palestinian struggle" was a result of Israel's "continuous disregard" of international institutions and "plunder" of Palestinian "rights and lands". Syria filed a complaint to the United Nations Security Council, urging it to "take responsibility and put pressure on Israel to stop its aggressive and provocative policy towards Lebanon".
- The United Kingdom expressed deep concerns and called on all parties to exercise restraint and protect civilian life in a statement released by the British Foreign and Commonwealth Office. The statement also said that "these developments make clearer than ever that a lasting and comprehensive resolution to the conflicts in the region is urgently needed and will only be achieved through negotiation".
- The United States expressed regret for the deaths, but that Israel had a right to secure its borders and its neighbors had a responsibility to prevent such activities, and urged maximum restraint. The United States also accused Syria of deliberately provoking Israel to distract attention from the government crackdowns on civilian protestors in Syria.
