= Ministry of Environment and Climate Change (Somalia) =

Government ministry of Somalia

Ministry of Environment and Climate Change - Somalia
- Wasaaradda Deegaanka iyo Isbedelka Cimiladda Soomaaliya
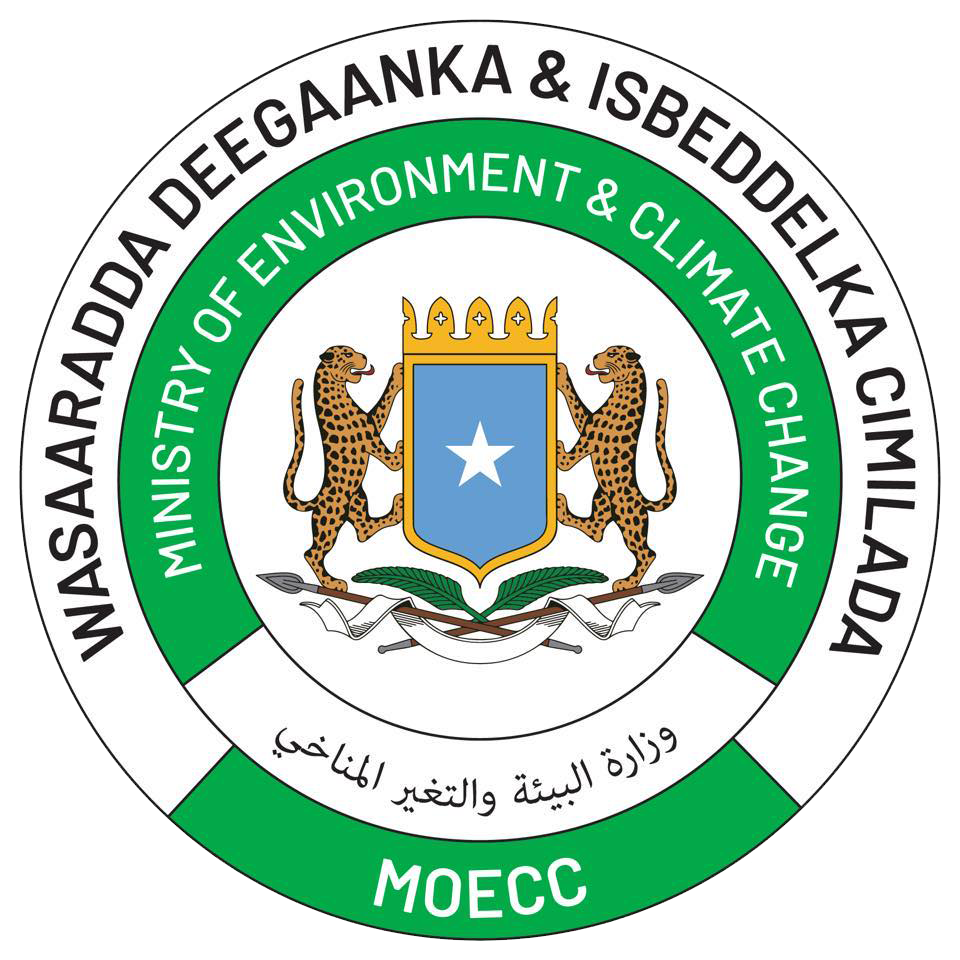
- Ministry of Environment and Climate Change - Somalia logo

Ministry overview
- Formed: 9 August 2022
- Jurisdiction: Federal Republic of Somalia
- Annual budget: $1.4 million (2024)
- Minister responsible: H.E Amb Khadija Mohamed Al-Makhzoumi
- Deputy Minister responsible: Dr. Siciid Maxamed Cali
- Website: moecc.gov.so

The Ministry of Environment and Climate Change is a government ministry in Somalia, responsible for the formulation and implementation of policies related to environmental conservation and climate change adaptation and mitigation. Established on August 9, 2022, during the administration of President Hassan Sheikh, the ministry was created as part of the government's response to environmental challenges facing Somalia. Khadija Mohamed Al Makhzoumi, a former ambassador, serves as the current Minister of Environment and Climate Change.

== Responsibilities ==
The Ministry of Environment and Climate Change has been mandated with several key objectives:

1. Environmental Conservation: One of the ministry's responsibilities is to oversee the protection of various ecosystems within Somalia, including forests, wetlands, and coastal areas. The ministry enacts regulations and conservation measures aimed at addressing deforestation, land degradation, and pollution.
2. Climate Change: The ministry is also tasked with strategies to mitigate and adapt to climate change. It aims to reduce greenhouse gas emissions, advocate for the use of renewable energy, and build climate resilience within vulnerable communities.
3. Natural Resource Management: The ministry oversees the sustainable utilization of natural resources like water, minerals, and land in Somalia. It enforces regulations aimed at responsible resource extraction and the protection of vital habitats.
4. Education and Awareness: One of the roles of the ministry is to increase public awareness and education concerning environmental and climate issues. It seeks to involve the public and various stakeholders in conservation efforts.
5. International Cooperation: The ministry engages in partnerships with regional and international bodies to exchange knowledge and collaborate on environmental and climate initiatives.

== Legislation and Initiatives ==
The ministry has been involved in several legislative and public initiatives:

1. Environmental Management Bill: The ministry was a proponent of Environmental Management Bill, which serves as a legal framework for environmental governance in Somalia. The bill includes provisions for penalties for environmental offenses.
2. Green Somalia Campaign: An initiative aimed at reforestation, the Green Somalia campaign, has set a goal of planting 10 million trees. It involves multiple stakeholders, including local communities and educational institutions.
3. National Climate Change Policy: This policy outlines the country's plans for mitigating and adapting to climate change impacts. National Climate Change Policy, integrates climate considerations into broader national development strategies.
4. National Environmental Policy: The National Environmental Policy is a comprehensive framework for environmental management in Somalia, focusing on sustainable practices and ecosystem protection.
5. African Great Green Wall Initiative: Somalia's participation in the African Great Green Wall Initiative with an allocation of $10 million, aims to address issues like desertification and deforestation, aligning with both regional and national conservation goals.
