= 2011 Tel Aviv nightclub attack =

Terrorist attack on a popular nightclub in Israel

- The attack site
- Location: 32°03′14″N 34°45′59″E; Tel Aviv, Israel
- Date: 29 August 2011; 1:40 (GMT+2)
- Attack type: Vehicle attack, stabbing spree
- Deaths: 0
- Injuries: 4 Israeli civilians 4 Israeli police officers
- Assailant: Muhammad Sa'afan

The 2011 Tel Aviv nightclub attack was a combined vehicular assault and stabbing attack which occurred on 29 August 2011 when a Palestinian attacker stole an Israeli taxi cab and rammed it into a police checkpoint guarding the popular nightclub, Haoman 17, in Tel Aviv which was filled with 2,000 Israeli teenagers. After crashing into the checkpoint, the attacker jumped out of the vehicle and began stabbing people. Four civilians, four police officers, and the assailant were injured in the attack. The assailant was living illegally in Israel at the time of the attack.

The plan of the attacker allegedly was to strike some of the hundreds of teenagers present at the nightclub. Nevertheless, due to an Israel Border Police roadblock at the entrance and immediate response of the Border Police team during the stabbing spree, a much larger and fatal mass-casualty incident was prevented.

== Background ==
The attack occurred during a period of heightened security on Israel's southern border following a series of Palestinian militant attacks two weeks prior launched from Egyptian territory and a spate of rocket attacks from Gaza. The Israel Defense Forces reported that they had upgraded their presence along the border with Egypt after receiving intelligence warning of a possible attack by the Palestinian Islamic Jihad (PIJ).

== Assailant ==
The assailant, a 21-year-old Palestinian man named Muhammad Sa'afan (alt.: Muhammad Bin Said Zofan), a native of Kalkilya, had been living in Israel as an illegal migrant, sleeping in an abandoned apartment adjacent to the disused Siksik mosque in the Jaffa neighborhood, and supporting himself by doing odd jobs. Sofram met Mohammed Bin Saddam Hussein Biari, a fellow Muslim of the same age, at prayer services in a Jaffa mosque. The two began planning to carry out a terrorist attack and Zofran began practicing the martial art of attacking with a knife and a stick in his apartment.

Although in the initial investigation the attacker insisted that he initiated, planned and prepared for the attack by himself, and that he bought the knife specifically for the stabbing attack and for the taxi robbery, Israeli security nevertheless investigated whether the assailant operated under the instructions and assistance of a terror organization, and whether there might be more attacks expected. According to a police official in Tel Aviv, the attacker had received preliminary information about the big party which took place at the "Haoman 17" nightclub during that specific time. The police official also stated "no one arrives by chance to such an event by chance to carry out a stabbing attack at that late hour, unless one has preliminary information".

Investigations revealed that during Ramadan, on 12 August 2011, Biari and Zofran plotted to attack Israeli security forces and civilian Jewish Israelis near the al-Aqsa mosque in Jerusalem. To this end, they purchased two knives and rode to Jerusalem on a public bus, staying at the Al-Aqsa Mosque on the Temple Mount for two weeks. However, according to Biari, Zofran told him that after speaking with a cleric at al-Aqsa he had decided to go back to Jaffa and become a "martyr" there. According to Biari, before leaving Jerusalem, Zofran borrowed Biari's cellphone and recorded a short film of himself that was intended for his parents. Biari stated that he had deleted the footage from his cellphone.

Zofran went to Tel Aviv's new Central Bus Station on 28 August. He had intended to stab a soldier, steal the soldier's gun, and use it to shoot border police. However, after reportedly failing to locate a suitable soldier to stab, he saw a tractor at a construction site on Yedidia Frenkel Street in Tel Aviv's Florentin neighborhood and instead determined to return to that site, steal the tractor, and kill soldiers by ramming the tractor into them. When he returned to the construction site later that night, he was unable to locate the tractor. It was at this point that, according to the indictment, he determined that he would carjack a taxi and carry out a ramming attack on border police stationed at the nearby junction of Salameh and Abarbanel streets.

== Attack ==
On Monday night, 29 August 2011, an Israeli taxi driver, Nachman Aji (60), who was driving his taxi on Salameh Street in Jaffa, picked up a passenger who sat next to the taxi driver and asked to be driven to the Tel Aviv Central Bus Station.

According to the taxi driver's testimony, shortly thereafter, around 1:30, the passenger pulled out a sharp knife and demanded that the taxi driver hand him the cab while insisting that "I do not want to hurt you". The driver attempted to fight the passenger but after the passenger stabbed him in the arm he agreed to hand over the vehicle. Driver told police that he had believed that assailant merely wanted to steal the car.

At around 1:40 the attacker drove the stolen taxi at full force into a Border Police roadblock, which was securing the popular Haoman 17 nightclub Tel Aviv, one of Tel Aviv's most popular nightclubs. The club was holding an end-of-summer celebration at the time and according to an estimation of Aharon Aksul, the head of the Tel Aviv police district; the party being held at the club that night was for high school students and the club contained over 1,000 teenagers at the time of the attack. Two Border Police officers were injured by the onrushing car.

According to the testimonies of police and people present at the scene, the driver was slumped over the steering wheel and the incident was initially perceived as a unintentional, but as a police officer approached to assist the driver, he began screaming Allahu Akbar, emerged from the car and "brutally" stabbed a nightclub security officer who had approached the car to assist the presumed accident victim, before being subdued by Yitzhak Assaraf, manager of the nightclub, together with security guards Oleg Chritov and Grigory Sokolov. The three men who subdued the terrorist were injured in the struggle. The attacker managed to stab several bystanders before the Border Police team at the site managed to wrestle the attacker to the ground and arrest him. To avoid panic, management instructed the DJ to keep the music playing, which he did for another hour. Only after the area outside the club had been secured did the management calmly evacuate the club of teenagers who had not know about the attack. Around 3:00 the security forces at the site began evacuating the teenagers from the club.

In total eight people were injured, three of them seriously: four policemen, three civilians and the taxi driver, in addition to the terrorist, who was slightly injured in the attack. All eight injured, including the terrorist, were taken to hospital for treatment. The civilians injured in the stabbing attacks suffered from cuts to their heads, limbs and abdominal areas.

== Legal proceedings ==
Although police requested that the suspect's custody be extended to 15 days following his arrest, the Petah Tikva Magistrate's Court extended it to only 10 days. The court hearing was held behind closed doors while the investigation was placed under a gag order.

Mohammed Bin Said Zofran (alt.: Muhammad Sa'afan) (21,) was indicted on 20 September 2011; charged with illegal residency, robbery, injury with serious intent, attempted murder, and conspiracy to commit a crime.

Second defendant, Mohammed Bin Saddam Hussein Biari (21) of Jaffa, was charged with failure to prevent a crime, conspiracy to commit a crime, and the destruction of evidence.

The perpetrator was convicted for the attack in March 2012, and sentenced to 18 years in prison. At the trial, the terrorist "refused to express any remorse."

== Victims ==
Two seriously injured border policemen returned to service after a rehabilitation process.

== Vehicle ramming as a trend ==
This was one of a small cluster of terrorist vehicle-ramming attacks in Israel in this period, others include the 2008 Jerusalem bulldozer attack, 2008 Jerusalem BMW attack and the 2011 Tel Aviv truck attack. Articles published by Alistair Jamison on NBC News, Joshua Keating in Slate, in Australia's The New Daily, and by the Counter Extremism Project cite this attack as an early example of the terrorist vehicle-ramming attacks that occurred frequently later in the decade in Europe.

In his 2013 book, A Citizen's Guide to Terrorism and Counterterrorism, Christopher C. Harmon references the attack as one of a group of vehicle-ramming attacks in which a terrorist deliberately attempts to run over victims with the intention of "making 'holy war'".

== Reactions ==
Domestic parties

Israel:

- Israel's Internal Security Minister Yitzhak Aharonovich praised the police response, stating "the message of this event is that the police officers are the bullet-proof vest that prevents terror attacks against teenagers."
- Israeli security officials expressed concern regarding how easily the suspect was able to reach Tel Aviv and that casualties could have been higher without the nearby roadblock. There was also fear of further attacks spurred by the end of Ramadan and the pending United Nations General Assembly vote on Palestinian independence.

Palestinian territories:

- The Palestinian Authority condemned the attack. An official statement issued by the PA President's Office in Ramallah said, "[t]he president condemns the attacking of civilians, including the event that took place in Tel Aviv this morning."

International

United States:

- The United States Department of State condemned the attack stating "the United States condemns in strongest terms yesterday's brutal attack on innocent civilians in Tel Aviv."
