= 2016 St. Cloud, Minnesota knife attack =

Stabbing attack in Minnesota, U.S.

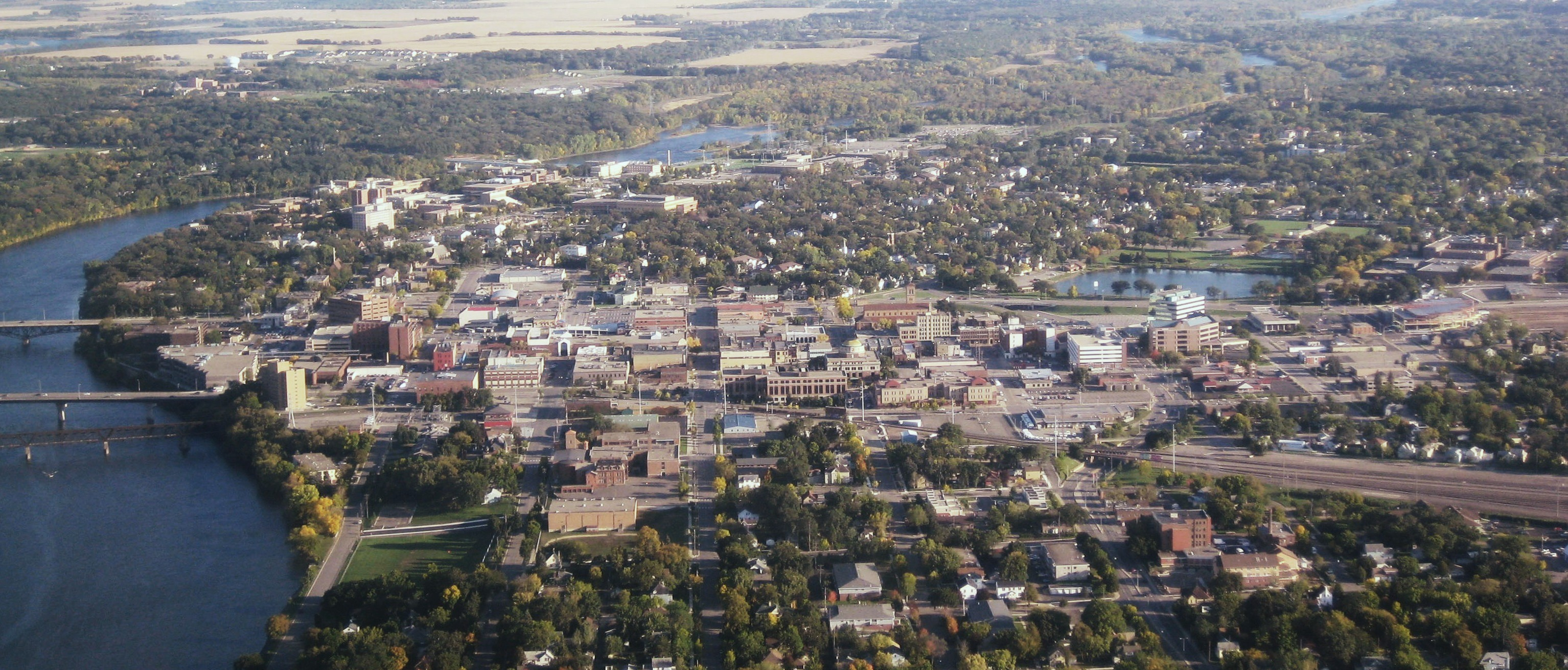
- Aerial view of St. Cloud
- Location: 45°33′24.12″N 94°12′37.08″W; St. Cloud, Minnesota, US
- Date: September 17, 2016; 8:15 p.m. (UTC-5)
- Target: Civilians
- Attack type: Mass stabbing
- Weapon: Two steak knives
- Deaths: 1 (the perpetrator)
- Injuries: 10
- Perpetrator: Dahir Ahmed Adan

On September 17, 2016, Dahir Ahmed Adan, a 22-year-old, Kenyan-born American man, stabbed ten people while wielding two knives at the Crossroads Center shopping mall in St. Cloud, Minnesota. He was shot dead inside the mall by an off-duty law enforcement officer who intervened. The Federal Bureau of Investigation investigated the incident to uncover a possible motive, including terrorism. Authorities said Adan may have been inspired by radical Islamic ideology, but they did not assign a motive for his actions.

== Attack ==
At about 8:15 p.m. on September 17, an individual began stabbing patrons at the Crossroads Center shopping mall. He was armed with two steak knives, one 10 inches and the other 9 inches. The stabbings first began outside the mall, at a nutrition store, before the attacker entered the building, stabbed an electronics store employee, and ran past a couple of other stores towards the Target and Macy's anchor stores.

Before the spree ended, ten people were injured, three of whom were hospitalized with non-life-threatening wounds. Reports said the attacker made references to Allah, including shouting "Allahu Akbar," and asked several people if they were Muslim.

Immediately following the stabbings, the attacker was confronted by Jason Falconer, a firearms instructor and part-time police officer from nearby Avon, Minnesota. When the attacker asked Falconer if he was a Muslim and Falconer answered no, he fled into the Macy's store, pursued by Falconer, who ordered him to drop his weapons. The attacker ran into the clothing display area, turned towards Falconer, and lay down on the floor while still holding both knives. He then charged at Falconer, who fired multiple rounds and shot him, and both fell down briefly in the main aisle. The attacker got up and charged at Falconer again, but he was shot again and fatally wounded.

=== Victims ===
Ten people were injured in the stabbing, three of whom were hospitalized for non-life-threatening wounds. They were all stabbed or punched in the back, shoulder, head, neck, or face. The hospitalized victims were all released by the next day. The victims were of ages 15 to 53.

== Perpetrator ==
Dahir Ahmed Adan (c. 1994 – September 17, 2016) was a member of St. Cloud's Somali-American community. He was born in Kenya and moved to the U.S. at the age of two on a refugee visa, becoming a U.S. citizen in 2008.

Adan was described by a community spokesman as having no record of violence, and as a good student who was more interested in sports than religion. He attended Apollo High School and was last enrolled in the St. Cloud State University in the spring of 2016, where he planned to major in information systems. He had three previous encounters with police for minor traffic violations. His friends described him as a Muslim, but they did not believe he had extremist views.

On October 6, 2016, the FBI announced that the evidence suggests the attack was premeditated and that the attacker had taken "interest recently in Islam, withdrew from his friends and encouraged his sisters to be more religious."

Adan had been employed part-time by the Swiss security services provider Securitas; he had been assigned to guard an unidentified Electrolux facility. He resigned in June 2016 and handed over his official uniform back to the company. A mall spokesperson said Adan never worked security at the mall, nor was he an employee of the company that did its security.

Two nights prior to the stabbing, Adan called a Somali community soccer coach asking for advice on how to lose weight; the coach later said that he believed Adan was not suffering from any mental illness at the time. According to a Somali-American community leader, Adan had saved up money to purchase the newly released iPhone 7 and was going to Crossroads Center to make the purchase. He was described as "joyful" and "happy" before leaving for the mall.

An autopsy performed on Adan following his death found that he died of exsanguination (blood loss) as a result of the six gunshot wounds he had sustained. He had been shot in the head, chest, side, back, and left leg.

== Aftermath ==
The day after the stabbing, St. Cloud Police Chief Blair Anderson declined to call the attack terrorism, saying that it did not appear anyone else was involved in the incident. The FBI started investigating the attack as a "potential" act of terrorism, and the agency's Joint Terrorism Task Force took the lead in the investigation, assisted by local police. The FBI began looking into Adan's social media and other contacts to find a motive.

ISIL claimed responsibility for the attack through its Amaq media agency, claiming Adan "was a soldier of the Islamic State".

On September 28, in the midst of the preliminary investigation, FBI Director James Comey said Adan may have been motivated by "some sort of inspiration from radical Islamic groups." In February 2017, Rick Thornton––the head of the FBI in Minneapolis––told the Associated Press that they were still investigating the attack, but that it was unlikely they could figure out Adan's motives and thought process.

In August 2017, St. Cloud Police Chief William Blair Anderson said, "The attack inspired a successful bid to the city for additional funds for training", and he praised Falconer's reaction to the attacker. On April 5, 2018, Senators Amy Klobuchar and Tina Smith and Representative Tom Emmer awarded Falconer the Congressional Badge of Bravery.

== Reactions ==
Leaders of Minnesota's Muslim community held a joint news conference in St. Cloud the day after the stabbings. They expressed concern at the rise of anti-immigrant and anti-Muslim sentiment in response to the attack, calling for unity among the general community.

== See also ==
- List of killings by law enforcement officers in the United States
- Jihadist extremism in the United States
- List of Islamist terrorist attacks
