= Pakistanis in Somalia =

Pakistani diaspora

- (Pakistan) (Somalia)

Total population
- 8,200 Baloch (1989); <1,000 Indo-Pakistanis (2001)

Regions with significant populations
- Mogadishu, Kismayo

Languages
- Balochi, Urdu, Punjabi, Sindhi, Somali

Religion
- Islam mostly Sunni

Related ethnic groups
- Pakistani Diaspora, Asian Africans

Pakistanis in Somalia are residents of Somalia who are of Pakistani ancestry. They were historically a small community of retail traders and businesspeople.

== Demographics ==
No official data exists on the current number or ethnic subdivisions of Pakistanis in Somalia. Under 1,000 Shia Indo-Pakistanis were reported to reside in the country in 2001.

As of 1989, a group of ethnic Baloch also lived in Somalia. An Iranic community, they were estimated at 8,200 residents.

== Community ==
There has been a small community of Pakistanis in Somalia since at least the 1960s. Historically, they were mainly shopkeepers, concentrated in Mogadishu and other southern urban areas. Pakistanis were among the main expatriate communities in the country, which also included Indians, Yemenis and Italians.

After the civil war broke out in Somalia in the early 1990s, most of the resident Pakistanis left the country. Around 5,700 Pakistani troops contributed to the ensuing UN peacekeeping operation in southern Somalia.

In the 2000s, some Pakistanis were reported to be among the ranks of foreign fighters involved in the Al-Shabaab-led Islamist insurgency in Somalia. Pakistani missionaries from the Tablighi Jamaat also frequently journeyed to the country, where they would engage in missionary work and dawah.

== Organizations ==
The Pakistani community in Somalia was diplomatically represented by the Pakistani embassy in Mogadishu. Established in 1973, it provided services to the resident Pakistanis.

== See also ==
- Somalis in Pakistan
- Pakistan–Somalia relations
