= Watts Hall =

Building on the Ohio State University campus in Columbus, Ohio, U.S.

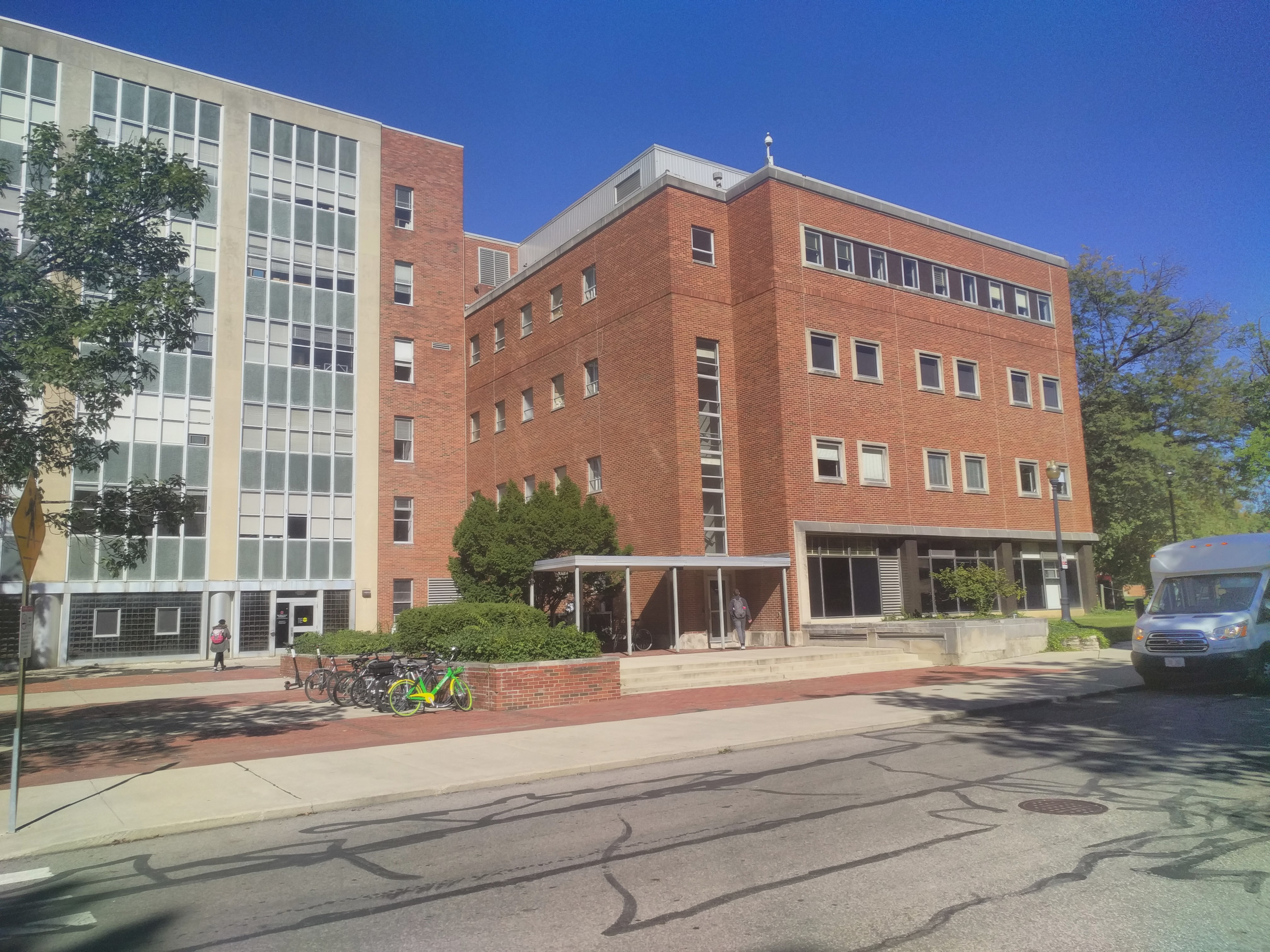
- The south entrance to Watts Hall
- Interactive map of the Watts Hall area

General information
- Coordinates: 40°00′12.5″N 83°00′40.5″W
- Construction started: October 19, 1954
- Completed: October 15, 1955
- Demolished: September 2022
- Cost: $787,374.19

Technical details
- Floor count: 4 floors

Watts Hall was a building on the Ohio State University campus, in Columbus, Ohio, United States. The building was named after Arthur S. Watts, a former head of the Department of Ceramic Engineering, and former president of the American Ceramic Society. It housed the OSU Department of Materials Science and Engineering before being demolished in 2022 to make way for the second phase of the BMEC project.

== History ==
Watts Hall was originally constructed in 1954 to house the Chemical Abstract Service of the American Chemical Society. In 1965, the CAS moved off of Ohio State's campus to a building on Dodridge Street. After the building was vacated, it was repurposed for the Department of Ceramic Engineering.

In November 2016, the courtyard adjacent to Watts Hall was the scene of a car ramming and stabbing attack that injured 10 people. Immediately after the attack, the perpetrator was fatally shot by an OSU police officer.
