= Somalis in Pakistan =

- (Somalia) (Pakistan)

Total population
- 2500 (2023)

Regions with significant populations
- Islamabad, Karachi, Hyderabad and Lahore.

Languages
- Somali · Arabic · Urdu

Religion
- Islam

Somalis in Pakistan are residents of Pakistan who are of Somali ancestry. They are a small community of mainly students as well as some secondary migrants, most of whom arrived after the start of the civil war in Somalia in the early 1990s.

== Demographics ==
The Somali community in Pakistan comprises around 2500 immigrants as of late 2023. It comprised 1400 to 1500 migrants only a few Years earlier, but steadily Grew in size as Somali immigrants effected a migration to Pakistan after the Start of the Al Shabab insurgency. The majority of Somalis are students pursuing education in various universities across the country.

Besides the majority students, 535 refugees and 37 asylum-seekers were at the time also legally registered with the UNHCR in Islamabad. Almost half of them arrived during the height of Somalia's Islamist insurgency between 2006 and 2009. 10 percent were young children and teenagers, and two percent were born in Pakistan. They formed the largest refugee group in Pakistan after Afghans.

Most Somalis in Pakistan are concentrated in major urban centers like Islamabad and Karachi. A few hundred live in Lahore. Islamabad's G-10 sector is home to several Somali businesses and residents, and is known as "Somali Street".

== Community ==
The Somali community in Pakistan mainly consists of students, as well as some secondary migrants who arrived after the civil war in Somalia broke out in the early 1990s. They are generally a young, educated community, supported by their parents who are based in the Middle East. Others receive remittances directly from relatives in Somalia.

The secondary migrants moved to Pakistan with the ultimate aim of emigrating to North America, Europe and Australia. As of mid-2012, most of the former were legally registered with the UNHCR in Islamabad. The agency offered skills-training programs in English, primary education courses, as well as provisions to cover basic amenities and living expenses. Members of the community sought to improve the quality and consistency of these services by raising their concerns with the relevant authorities. Additionally, the UNHCR issued Proof of Registration (POR) Cards to the secondary migrants in conjunction with NADRA. Others wielded a National Aliens Registration Authority (NARA) Card. A section of the younger generation among this group was born and raised in Pakistan. The expiration of the POR Cards in December 2012 saw a more expedited movement of the transient migrants from Pakistan to other countries.

Somali pupils in Pakistan mostly study engineering, medicine and pharmacy. They typically return to Somalia after having completed their studies due to a lack of employment opportunities for migrants in Pakistan, as well as a desire to contribute to the post-conflict reconstruction process in their home country. Others have moved on to other nations, drawn by the possibility of better work options.

Somali students pursue higher studies in Pakistan due to entry restrictions and the higher cost of education in the Western world. They often do so through the auspices of the local Somalia embassy. The embassy provides scholarship opportunities to the pupils, particularly those in the field of engineering. Students studying medicine pay tuition costs ranging from $1,500 to $3,000 for a five-year term.

A third tier of Somali pupils arrived through individuals and private offices, like many other foreigners. These parties specialize in visa requirements, processing them for a small fee.

Additionally, other Somali students and foreigners in general travel to Pakistan for Tabligh purposes. They mainly migrate for da'wah and receiving religious instruction. Most such students attend local Islamic universities or seminaries with free tuition or low instruction fees.

== Organizations ==
Somalis in Pakistan are diplomatically represented by the Somalia embassy in Islamabad.

Various Somali-run organizations also serve the community. Among these are the Somali Students Union and the Somali Forum.

== See also ==
- Pakistanis in Somalia
- Pakistan–Somalia relations
