= 2016 Ohio restaurant machete attack =

Stabbing attack in Ohio, U.S.

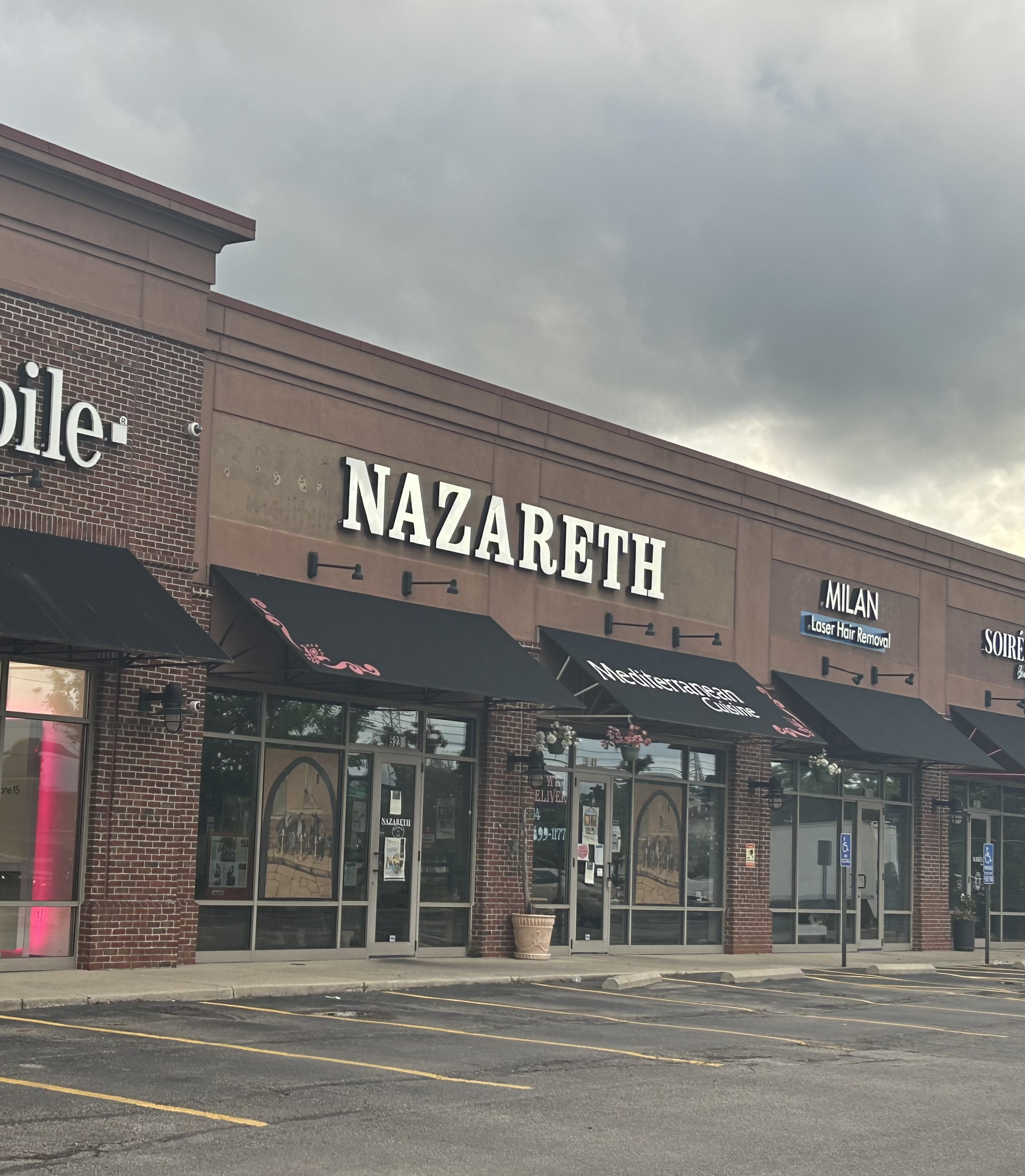
- Nazareth, the location of the attack, as seen in 2024
- Location: Gahanna, Ohio, U.S. 40°03′50″N 82°51′48″W
- Date: February 11, 2016; 6:00 p.m. (EST)
- Attack type: Mass slashing, terrorism
- Weapons: Machete; Filet knife; Toyota Corolla
- Deaths: 1 (the perpetrator)
- Injuries: 4
- Perpetrator: Mohamed Barry
- Motive: undetermined

On February 11, 2016, Mohamed Barry, a native of Guinea who was a permanent resident in the United States and had been working in computer programming and information technology, entered the Nazareth Restaurant in Gahanna, Ohio, and began to attack customers with a machete, injuring four. Barry was killed as he attempted to attack police officers with his machete. Four years prior to the incident, he had been investigated by the Federal Bureau of Investigation (FBI) for making radical statements. The attack was investigated as a possible instance of lone-wolf terrorism. In 2017, the White House said it was a terrorist attack.

== Attack ==
Barry first entered the restaurant at about 5:20 p.m. and spoke to an employee. The nature of that conversation has not been revealed by investigators. However, NBC News reported that Barry asked the employee where the restaurant's owner was from. According to restaurant owner Hany Baransi, the employee told Barry that Baransi is from Israel. Barry left the restaurant afterwards and returned half an hour later, armed with a machete.

Barry immediately swung his machete to attack Debbie and Gerald Russell, both 43, who were sitting in a booth near the front of the restaurant. He then moved on to the next table of people and then attacked Bill Foley, a musician performing at the restaurant and a friend of Baransi's. Neil McMeekin, at the 2nd table attacked, was able to get Barry off of Foley by hitting him with a chair. Shafi Ali, an immigrant from Dubai and an employee of Nazareth Restaurant, then drove Barry off with a metal baseball bat. Foley, the Russells, and Neil McMeekin all suffered injuries from the attack. About twenty people were inside the restaurant at the time of the attack.

Barry fled the scene in a white Toyota Corolla and collided shortly thereafter with a Mercedes. The driver of the Mercedes called 9-1-1, explaining that he had just gotten into an accident and that the other driver had a large knife. During the police pursuit, officers ran a routine search on the license plate number of the car Barry was driving; the search triggered an alert instructing the pursuing officers to contact the local terrorism task force.

The officers tried to execute a PIT maneuver to force his Toyota off the road, but it was unsuccessful. A second PIT maneuver succeeded, and the vehicle crashed into a street curb. As officers approached the vehicle, Barry emerged and lunged at them with the machete and a filet knife, allegedly yelling "Allahu Akbar!", though when asked by WSYX, Columbus police responded that "up to this point in its investigation; this is the first time they have heard the phrase "allahu Akbar" connected to the case." He was first tasered by officers, but when this did not stop him, they fired their guns. Barry was shot repeatedly and died of a bullet wound in his neck.

Barry was 30 at the time of his death. A native of Guinea in West Africa, he had arrived in the U.S. in 2000. At the time of the attack, he was in the U.S. legally on a green card. He had worked in computer programming and information technology.

== FBI investigation ==
Although he did not have any encounters with Columbus police, Barry was known to the FBI for making radical comments. The FBI has not released details of their investigation into him, which took place four years before the attack. Jeff Pegues, the homeland security correspondent for CBS News, reported that "law enforcement is concerned that this incident has the hallmarks of the type of so-called 'lone wolf' terrorist attack."

An investigation into the possibility of Berry being a self-radicalized Islamist terrorist was launched a week after the attack. As of May 10, 2016, authorities have not ruled out the possibility that Barry was a self-radicalized "lone wolf".

== Nazareth Restaurant ==
Hany Baransi, the owner and manager of the popular restaurant on North Hamilton Road, describes himself as an Israeli Christian Arab who immigrated to America from Haifa, Israel. He has been operating Nazareth Restaurant in a local strip mall for 27 years. Nazareth is known for serving Middle Eastern dishes including shawarma, gyros, lamb kebabs, and stuffed grape leaves. An Israeli flag is on display inside his restaurant.

The Washington Post described Baransi as a "popular local figure" and his restaurant as a "multicultural mingling place"; a painting of a Christian, a Jew, and a Muslim in amicable conversation hangs on the wall.

Baransi believes that the attack was an act of terrorism because he is Israeli and added that there were a number of other restaurants in the strip mall that Barry could have chosen to attack. However, an FBI official stated that the investigation was still in its early stages and that it was too soon to jump to conclusions.

== Aftermath ==
Columbus area musicians organized a benefit concert to raise funds for the victims.

The restaurant was closed down in the immediate wake of the attack, with a partial reopening four days after the attack. Baransi expected the restaurant to be fully back to normal operation by February 19. The restaurant fully reopened at 11:00 a.m. on that day, but it was abruptly closed down again hours later, with a post on social media clarifying that the staff needed more time to recuperate.

In the days immediately after the attack, Baransi announced his belief that his employees were in danger because of his Israeli background and the hatred he and his staff were subsequently subjected to. He also added that he loved the U.S., but felt it was no longer safe; that local and national officials had not offered support to him, the victims, and his employees and customers; and that he was disappointed the attack was not being recognized as an act of terrorism. He then announced his plans to leave the U.S. and close his restaurant permanently. His wife stated that she is trying to persuade him to change his mind. Columbus Mayor Andrew Ginther told reporters that he hopes to persuade Baransi to stay in Columbus.

The restaurant stayed open, although Baransi continued to assert that authorities in Columbus and the United States in general do not take the threat of terrorist sufficiently seriously.

In November 2016, following a car-ramming and stabbing attack at Ohio State University, Columbus Police Deputy Chief Michael Woods compared it to the restaurant attack committed by Barry as also a potential act of terrorism.

In February 2017, the White House listed the machete attack as a terrorist attack.

Hany Baransi, owner of the Nazareth Deli, who had expressed frustration that federal authorities declined to call the attack terrorism and offered little or no support to him, said he felt relieved that the White House has designated the machete attack on his store as an act of terrorism.

== See also ==
- 2014 Queens hatchet attack
