= Haoman 17 =

Chain of nightclubs in Israel

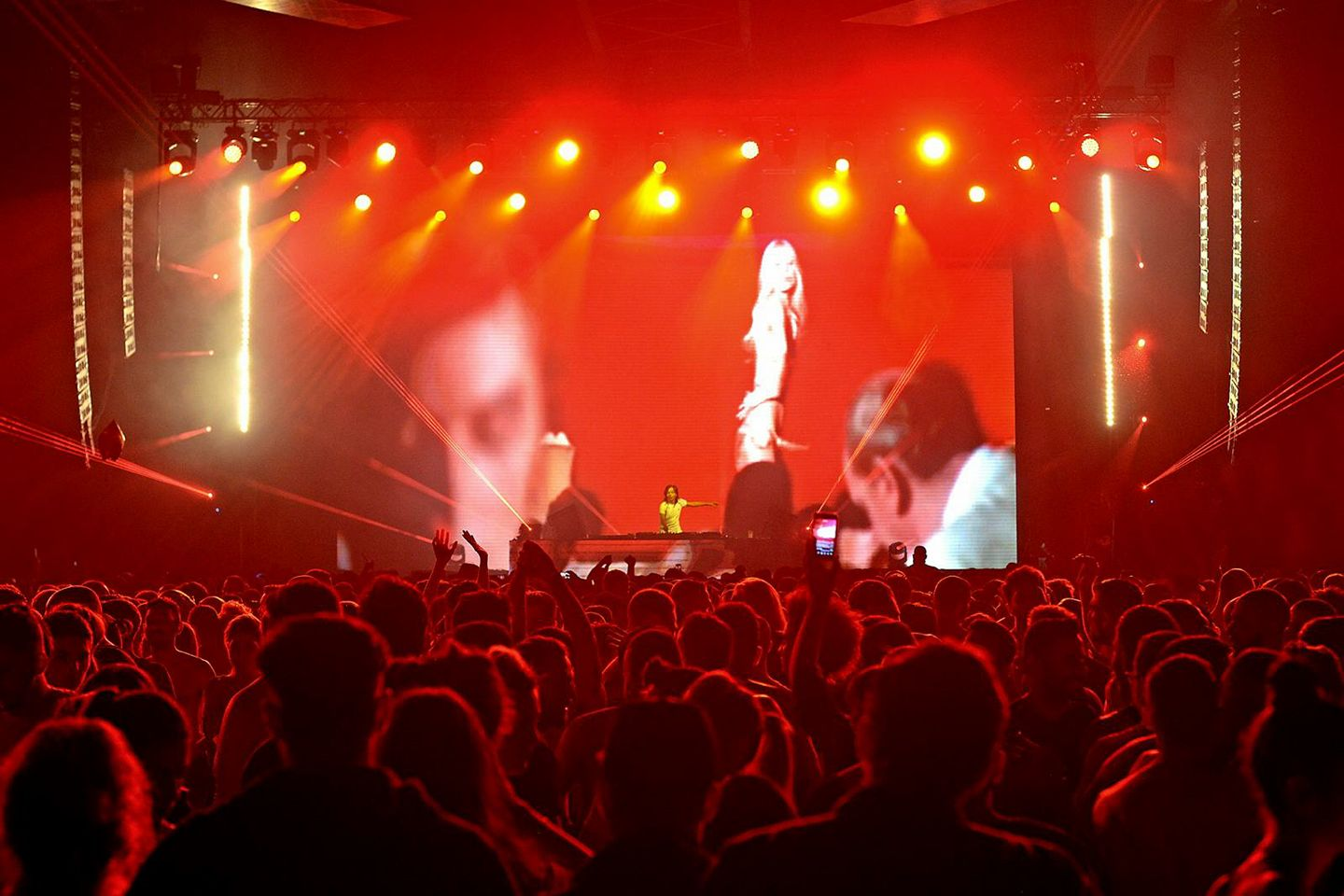
Offer Nissim perform at Haoman 17 in Tel Aviv, Israel

Haoman 17 (Hebrew: האומן 17, lit. 'The Artist 17') is a chain of nightclubs in Israel.

Haoman 17 in Jerusalem has been rated one of the top night clubs in the world. It was opened in 1995 by Ruben Lublin and a group of young promoters from Jerusalem. The Tel Aviv branch was listed in DJ Magazine's Top 100 chart of clubs in 2009. International DJs often play at the club, which is open on Thursday and Friday nights.

== History ==
The first club opened in Jerusalem's Talpiot industrial zone in 1995, and was named for its address: 17 Haoman Street. The original club in Jerusalem stood out in comparison to other Israeli nightclubs mainly due to its advanced audio equipment, innovative design and the fact that various world-renowned DJs came frequently to perform at the club, among them Tiësto, John Acquaviva, Circulation, Layo & Bushwacka!, Mr C, Richie Hawtin, Dave Angel, Armin Van Buuren, Steve Lawler, Dave Seaman, Derrick May, Erick E, Master H, Dan Ghenacia and Dimitri. Due to this, the Jerusalem club drew many party goers who traveled from various places outside of the Israeli capital to the nightclub. The club also became internationally famous for its extravagant Jewish holidays after parties that happened 6 times a year, in collaboration with the notorious Tel-Aviv gay party promoter Shirazi and the most famous Israeli door selector Yair Shaham. The parties started at 6 a.m. and lasted 20 straight hours, with a different theme to every party and at least two international guests in the DJ booth alongside the resident DJs Sahar Zangilevitch and Asi Kojack.

Other resident DJs at the club included DJ Jez Ansell, Tal Pinhasi, Yuval Zach, an Omri H.

The club in Jerusalem has seen many ups but also a few downs, such as a huge fire that closed the venue down for two weeks and a highly media covered raid by the Israeli tax officials which sent all the owners of the club to jail for a long period of time. The Jerusalem branch closed in 2007.

In the early 2000s, the establishment opened two more branches in Tel Aviv (2005) and Haifa (2002). The Haifa Haoman 17 nightclub closed a few years after its opening following a violent incident outside the club that left the owners no choice but to shut it down. The Tel Aviv nightclub became successful and is nowadays considered to be the most prosperous and thriving entertainment venue in Tel Aviv and among other things occasionally hosts parties for the gay community, and is also occasionally rented out for private events. In its short life, the Tel-Aviv branch has already hosted great international names such as Armin Van Buuren, Laurent Garnier, Sven Vath, Paul Van Dyk, Sasha, Tiësto and most of the Jerusalem branch's old guests. It has also hosted parties for Madonna and many famous Israeli film openings and fashion shows.

On August 29, 2011 at 1:50 a.m. (GMT+2) a combined vehicular and stabbing attack was committed outside of the Haoman 17 nightclub in Tel Aviv, in which a Palestinian attacker stole a taxi cab and rammed it into a police checkpoint guarding the club, which was filled with 2,000 teenagers. After crashing into the checkpoint, the attacker jumped out of the vehicle and stabbed several people. Four civilians and four police officers were injured in the attack. The plan of the attacker allegedly was to strike some of the hundreds of teenagers present at the nightclub. Nevertheless, due to an Israel Border Police roadblock at the entrance and the immediate response of the Border Police team during the stabbing spree, a mass-casualty incident was avoided and club-goers inside the building were unaware that an attempted attack on the club had occurred.

== See also ==
- List of electronic dance music venues
