= Khadija Al Makhzoumi =

Somali diplomat

Her Excellency Khadija Al Makhzoumi
- خديجة محمد المخزومي
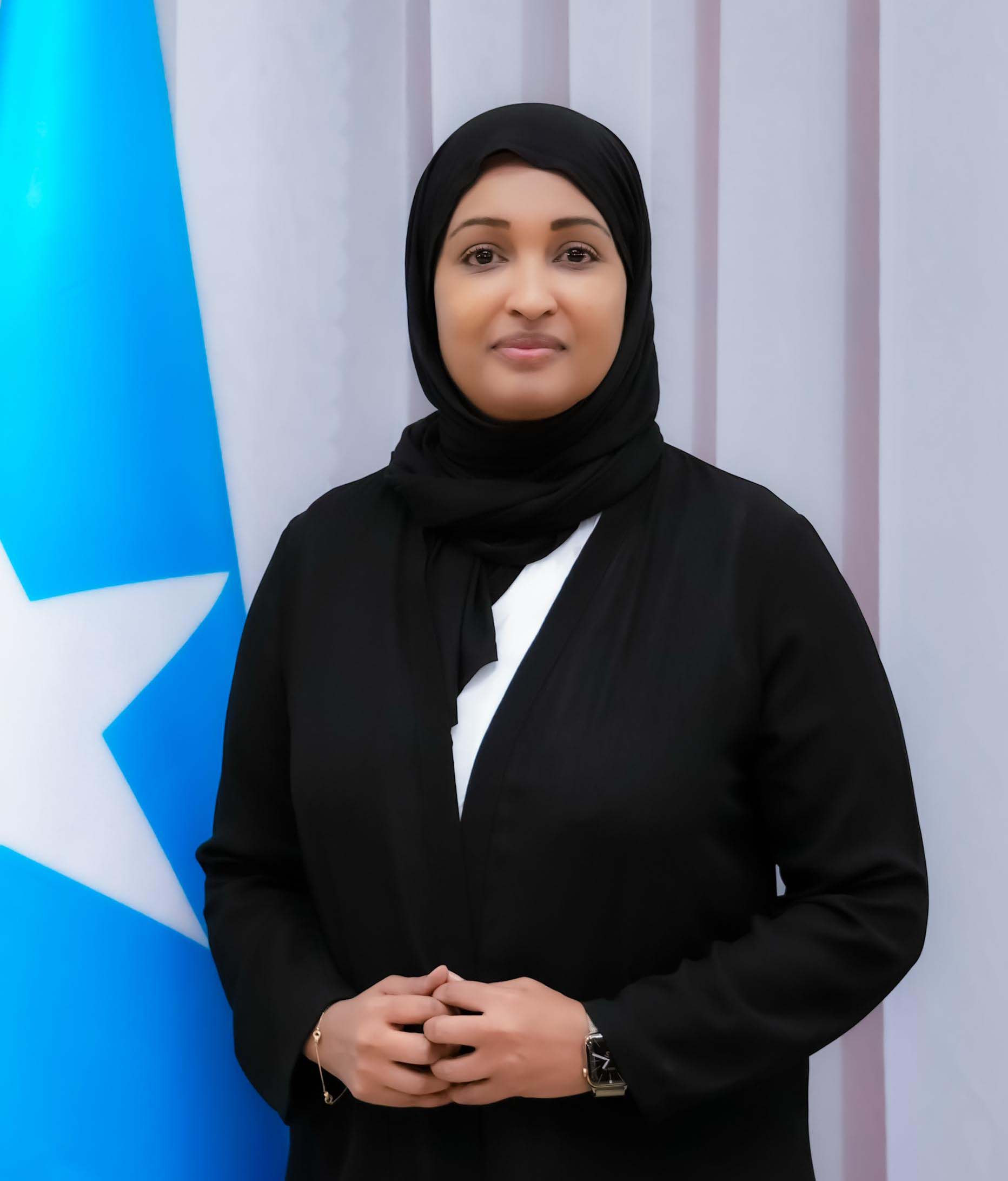

Minister of Family & Human Rights Development
- Incumbent
- Assumed office 5 January 2025
- President: Hassan Sheikh Mohamud
- Prime Minister: Hamza Abdi Barre

Minister of Environment & Climate Change
- In office 9 August 2022 – 5 January 2025
- President: Hassan Sheikh Mohamud
- Prime Minister: Hamza Abdi Barre
- Constituency: Banadir Mogadishu

MP of the Somali House of representatives
- Incumbent
- Assumed office 25 February 2022

Somali Ambassador to Pakistan
- In office 24 July 2016 – 8 March 2022
- President: Hassan Sheikh Mohamud
- Prime Minister: Omar Abdirashid Ali Sharmarke
- Preceded by: Cabdisalaan Xaaji Axmed Dhabancad

Somali Ambassador to Iraq
- In office 21 June 2015 – 19 May 2016
- President: Hassan Sheikh Mohamud
- Prime Minister: Omar Abdirashid Ali Sharmarke
- Preceded by: Isse Ali Mohamed
- Succeeded by: Abdullahi Sheikh Mohamed

Personal details
- Born: Mogadishu, Somalia
- Education: Anglia Ruskin University, UK; University of Southampton, UK

Khadija Mohamed Al-Makhzoumi (Somali: Khadija Mohamed Al-makhzoumi, Arabic: خديجة محمد المخزومي) is a Somali diplomat and politician. She currently serves as the Minister of Family & Human Rights Development in Somalia and as a member of the Federal Parliament of Somalia's House of the People. She has previously served as Ambassador of Somalia to Iraq and Pakistan.

== Career ==
Al-Makhzoumi joined the Somali Ministry of Foreign Affairs in 2008. In 2008–09, she offered her services as Liaison's Office in the U.K., Ministry of Diaspora, Somalia. From 2010 to 2011, she served as a Counsellor at the Somali Embassy in Malaysia.

Portrait of Khadija Al-Makzoumi (2015)

From 2011 to 2013, Al-Makhzoumi worked as the Senior Political Adviser to the Somalian Minister of Foreign Affairs.

She was the Ambassador of Somalia to Iraq, based at the Somali embassy in Baghdad. She was assigned to the office on 2 April 2015. She has also served as a political advisor to the Arab League.

Al-Makhzoumi served as Somalia's Ambassador to Pakistan from 2016 to 2022. During her tenure as Ambassador to Pakistan, Al-Makhzoumi played a role in strengthening bilateral relations between the two countries. One notable achievement was the signing of a $10.5 million accord between Pakistan and Somalia for the implementation of an identification system. This agreement, signed in May 2018, aimed to enhance administrative processes and improve security measures in Somalia.

H.E Amb. Khadija Mohamed Al Makhzoumi at a Federal Government's ministerial meeting (2022)

Al-Makhzoumi assumed office as Minister of Environment and Climate Change on 9 August 2022, and was responsible for developing and implementing environmental policies, strategies, laws, and regulations in the country. While in post she visited Finland to strengthen "Climate Cooperation" between the nations.

On 5 January 2025, Al-Makhzoumi assumed office as Minister of Family and Human Rights Development.

In 2026 she spoke at the 61st Session of the United Nations Human Rights Council.

== Awards ==
In recognition of Al-Makhzoumi's contribution towards building Pakistan's partnership with Somalia, the Diplomatic Insight Group conferred an award to her. She has also been awarded:

- Global Ambassador Award
- Africa Sustainability Outliers Award 2023

== Achievements ==
Green Somalia Initiative

Green Climate Fund and Somalia: Accelerated USD 100 million investment partnership

Reform of the international financial architecture and the role of GCF

Somalia joins Global Green Growth Institute

Launch of the Climate, Environment, Peace, and Security Declaration and Initiative

Minister Khadija has banned single-use plastics, effective October 1, 2024

FAO Director-General and Somali Minister Discuss Strategic Collaboration on Climate Action and Development

Adapting to the Climate Crisis in East Africa

Somalia's Minister of Environment & Climate Change Calls Urgent Action at Climate Mobility Summit
