= Joshua Keating =

American journalist

- Education: Oberlin College (BA)
- Occupation: Journalist
- Employer: Vox (website)

Joshua Keating is an American journalist. He is currently a senior correspondent covering foreign policy at Vox. He was previously a writer and editor at Slate and Foreign Policy.

== Media coverage ==
Keating's Slate posts have been republished in many venues, such as the New Haven Register, the Waco Tribune-Herald, and Press of Atlantic City.

Starting 2013, Keating penned a satirical "If It Happened There" which was self-described as "a regular feature in which American events are described using the tropes and tone normally employed by the American media to describe events in other countries." The series received widespread discussion.

== Bibliography ==
=== Articles ===
- Keating, Joshua (Jan 2013). "Time". Phenomenon. Smithsonian. 43 (9): 11–12.

=== Books ===
- Keating, Joshua (2018). Invisible Countries: Journeys to the Edge of Nationhood. Yale. ISBN 978-0-300-22162-6.
