= Crossroads Center (St. Cloud, Minnesota) =

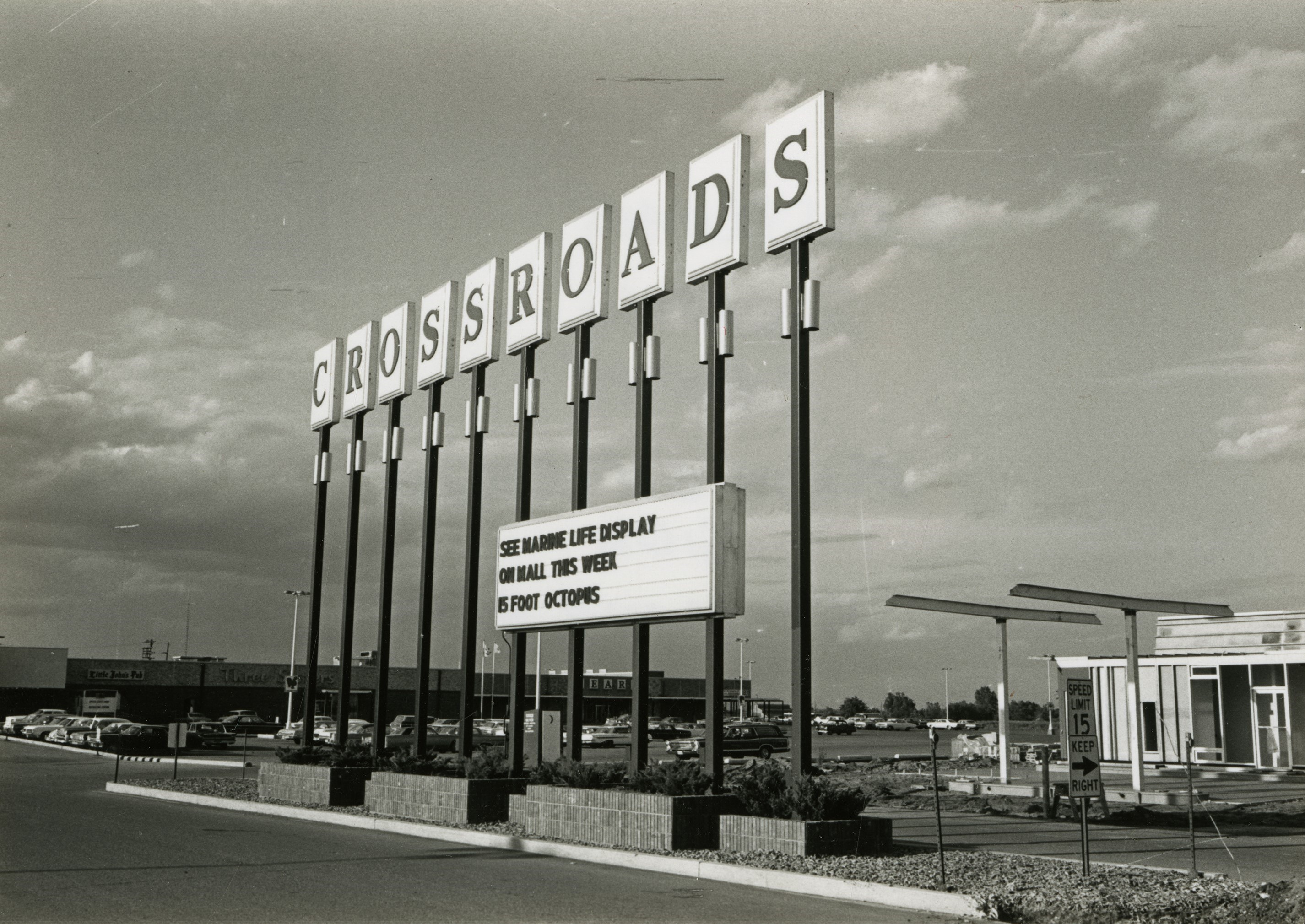
- Crossroads Center sign at main entrance in 1966.
- Location: St. Cloud, Minnesota, United States
- Coordinates: 45°33′20″N 94°12′36″W
- Opened: April 20, 1966; 60 years ago
- Developer: Crossroads Center, Inc.
- Manager: Spinoso Real Estate Group
- Architect: George G. Mastny
- Num. of stores: 102
- Num. of anchor tenants: 4 (3 open, 1 closed)
- Floor area: 890,000 sq ft (83,000 m^{2})
- Floors: 1 (2 in JCPenney and Scheel's All Sports)
- Public transit: Metro Bus
- Website: www.crossroadscenter.com

Crossroads Center is a shopping mall in St. Cloud, Minnesota, United States, and is the largest mall in the state outside the core Twin Cities metro area. It has three anchor stores: JCPenney, Target, and Scheels All Sports, and one vacant anchor store, formerly Macy's. Junior anchors include HomeGoods and DSW Inc.

== History ==
Groundbreaking at the 40-acre site of Crossroads Center started in September 1964. By the end of 1965, a movie theater and Sears were opened. J.C. Penney opened the first week of 1966; and the mall officially opened in April 1966. Besides Penney's, Sears, and the theater, the other stores at the mall on opening day were American Family Insurance, Buttrey's, Crossroads Barbershop, D.J. Bitzan Jewelers, Del Farm Food Store, Fanny Farmer Candy Store, Hallmark Cards, Lucille Heinen Beauty Salon, Jensen Fabrics, Kiddie Koncessions, Kinney Shoes, Musicland, Pako Film Shop, Ralph's Bakery, Scheels Hardware, Shirley's Maternity Fashions, St Clair's Menswear, Stevenson's, Three Sisters, Walbom's Apparel, Walgreens, and F.W. Woolworth Company.

A 200,000 sq. ft. addition to the mall in 1976 added Dayton's Department Store and other specialty stores. Dayton's would acquire Marshall Field's and rebrand their stores with the Marshall Field's nameplate in 2001. Marshall Field's was ultimately sold to Federated Stores, resulting in the name change to Macy's on September 9, 2006.

The center was renovated in 2004, with the construction of "additional skylights, 700-seat Food Court, family restrooms, improved traffic flow and parking, streamlined common area and children’s soft play area".

In October 2017, it was announced that Sears would be closing the Crossroads Center location in January 2018. HomeGoods, Ulta Beauty, and DSW currently occupy the former Sears location.

On January 8, 2026, Macy's announced that it would be closing as part of a plan to close 14 stores by the end of Q1 2026.

=== 2016 stabbing ===
On September 17, 2016, Crossroads Center was the site of a mass stabbing attack.
