= Stabbing as a terrorist tactic =

Terrorist use of knife attacks as a tactic

Stabbing attacks became an increasingly common form of terrorism targeting random civilians in the 21st century, in particular during the 2010s and 2020s.

== History ==
=== 19th century ===
A foundational stabbing in the history of terrorism was the 13 November 1893 stabbing by anarchist Léon Léauthier during the Ère des attentats. This attack is considered a foundational event of modern terrorism because Léauthier targeted a complete stranger; he was thus acting within the emerging logic of indiscriminate and mass terrorism.

=== 20th and 21st century ===
According to security analyst Peter Bergen in 2017, stabbing attacks have gained popularity because such attacks are inexpensive and easy to carry out, but very difficult for security services to prevent. According to Juan Romero, this resurgence emerged first with the GIA in the 1990s and later among Palestinian terrorists and Islamic State militants in the 21st century.

A wave of lone wolf terrorist stabbing attacks in which Palestinian Arabs attacked Israeli civilians began on 3 October 2015 with the first of the Lions' Gate stabbings. The ensuing 2015–2016 wave of violence in Israeli-Palestinian conflict is thought to have been driven not by formal organizations but, rather by social media postings inspiring young Palestinians to undertake attacks with knives and with vehicles. In response, by mid-2017, Israeli police had revamped their anti-terrorism tactics, increased their monitoring of social media, improved the intercommunication of mobile devices, and gave security agencies the ability to instantly trace phone calls made from such devices.

The series of Palestinian stabbing attacks were followed by the spread of such attacks during a wave of Islamic terrorism in Europe which had seen "at least" 10 stabbing attacks allegedly motivated by Islamic extremism in Europe by the spring of 2017, with a particular concentration of such attacks in France.

==== Online recruitment efforts by Islamist groups in the 2010s ====
In May 2016, Al-Qaeda's Inspire published an article entitled "O Knife Revolution, Head Toward America". The magazine urged Muslims to kill "the intelligentsia, economic and influential personalities of America", by low-tech methods including stabbing attacks, as such assaults are "easy options that do not require huge efforts or man power, but the result is parallel to the big operations or even more".

In October 2016, Rumiyah, the online propaganda and recruitment magazine published by the Islamic State told followers that holy warriors down through Muslim history have "struck the necks of the kuffar" in the name of Allah, with "swords, severing limbs and piercing the fleshy meat of those who opposed Islam". The magazine advised its readers that knives are easy to obtain, easy to hide, and deadly, and that they make good weapons in places where Muslims might be regarded with suspicion.

=== Attacks in the 2020s ===
- 2021 Auckland supermarket stabbing
- 2024 Wakeley church stabbing
- 2025 Duhok axe attack

== See also ==
- Mass stabbing
- Sicarii – ancient Jewish extremists who used this terrorist tactic
- List of knife attacks by Islamic extremists

== Bibliography ==
- Ferragu, Gilles (2019), "L'écho des bombes : l'invention du terrorisme « à l'aveugle » (1893-1895)" [The echo of bombs: The invention of indiscriminate terrorism (1893–1895)], Ethnologie française, 49 (1): 21–31, doi:10.3917/ethn.191.0021
