= List of attacks on legislatures =

The following is a list of attacks on state or national legislatures.

== Before 1900 ==
Attack	Date	Country	Details
Gunpowder Plot	5 November 1605	England	Failed assassination attempt against King James I by a group of provincial English Catholics led by Robert Catesby.
Five Members	5 November 1642	England	Attempt to arrest members of the House of Commons by King Charles I, leading to the First English Civil War.
Battle of York	27 April 1813	Upper Canada	The U.S. Army temporarily occupied the Upper Canada capital of York (modern-day Toronto) during the War of 1812, plundering and burning many government buildings including the seat of the Legislative Assembly of Upper Canada.
Burning of Washington	24 August 1814	United States	A British Army force under the command of General Robert Ross marched into Washington, D.C. after winning the Battle of Bladensburg in the Chesapeake Campaign and burnt numerous buildings—including the White House and the U.S. Capitol—in retaliation for the Battle of York and similar American raids in Upper Canada. The U.S. federal government, including President James Madison, was forced to evacuate to Montgomery County, Maryland. To date, the incident remains the only time the US capital was invaded or occupied by a foreign force.
Storming of the Venezuelan National Congress	24 January 1848	Venezuela	Brawl at the headquarters of the Venezuelan Congress in Caracas between the Conservatives and Liberals, which had led almost two decades of continuous clashes.
French demonstration of 15 May 1848	15 May 1848	France	Intended to reverse the results of a Second-Republic election of deputies to the Constituent Assembly.
Burning of the Parliament Buildings in Montreal	25 April 1849	British Canada	Part of week-long rioting by Montreal Tories against the passage of the Rebellion Losses Bill providing amnesties and indemnities following the Rebellions of 1837–1838
Haitian Civil War of 1867–1869	14 October 1867	Haiti	During a standoff related to the Montas affair, a pro-Sylvain Salnave mob entered the chamber of deputies and expelled all its representatives. Chairs and tables were broken and portraits were damaged.
French Chamber of Deputies bombing	9 December 1893	France	Auguste Vaillant, an anarchist, threw a homemade bomb inside the Chamber of Deputies of France and was immediately arrested after slightly injuring twenty deputies. He was tried and guillotined in February the following year.

== 20th century ==
Attack	Date	Country	Details
1908 bombardment of the Majlis	23 June 1908	Qajar Iran	During the Persian Constitutional Revolution, Persian Cossacks loyal to Shah Mohammad Ali Shah Qajar and commanded by Russian colonel Vladimir Liakhov bombarded the Baharestan building housing the National Consultative Assembly in Tehran to force the surrender of the leaders of the Constitutional Movement before plundering the building.
1915 United States Capitol bomb attack	2 July 1915	United States	German-American activist, spy and former Harvard University professor Eric Muenter hid a package containing three sticks of dynamite and a timer under a telephone switchboard in the U.S. Capitol's Senate reception room. The bomb exploded at 11:40 p.m., causing no casualties or injuries. Muenter, who at that time was living under the guise of Stanford professor "Frank Holt" after killing his pregnant wife in 1906, then bombed the SS Minnehaha in New York City and shot J. P. Morgan Jr. in the span of the next 24 hours. According to Muenter, his actions were in order to prevent United States involvement in World War I.
Storming of the Belgian Parliament	29 July 1920	Belgium	World War I veterans stormed the Palace of the Nation housing the Belgian Parliament, demanding the government hear their demands for compensation.
Romanian Senate Bombing	8 December 1920	Kingdom of Romania	Max Goldstein - a Jewish-Romanian far-left extremist - planted a bomb in the Romanian Senate Building, killing justice minister Dimitrie Greceanu and two members of the Senate Demetriu Radu and Spirea Gheorghiu, while wounding the chamber president Constantin Coandă. It was the first event of domestic terrorism in Romanian history.
Bombing of the Mexican Congress	23 May 1928	Mexico	Attack by opponents of President Plutarco Elías Calles.
Yugoslav parliament shooting	20 June 1928	Kingdom of Yugoslavia	Puniša Račić – a Serbian nationalist MP from the Radical Party – opened fire during a session of the National Assembly in Belgrade, targeting members of the Croatian Peasant Party (HSS). The attack resulted in the immediate deaths of two Croatian MPs, Đuro Basariček and Pavle Radić, while two more MPs were wounded - Ivan Granđa and Ivan Pernar. The main target was Stjepan Radić - Croatian political leader and a president of the HSS who was seriously wounded and died a few weeks later in Zagreb. Historical accounts and contemporary research link the assassination to broader Greater Serbian political circles, suggesting the involvement or prior knowledge of King Alexander I. The event dismantled the parliamentary system and served as the direct pretext for the King to abolish the constitution and proclaim a royal dictatorship on 6 January 1929. This assassination is considered the definitive turning point that ended democratic prospects and permanently destabilized the Kingdom of Yugoslavia.
Bombing of the Central Legislative Assembly Building	8 April 1929	British India	Indian nationalists Bhagat Singh and Batukeshwar Dutt threw two bombs and leaflets inside the Central Legislative Assembly (the lower house of the British Indian legislature) in New Delhi in protest over the Trade Disputes and the Public Safety Bill being presented in the Assembly and the death of Lala Lajpat Rai. Few sustained injuries in the explosion and there were no deaths, which Singh and Dutt claimed was intentional. Singh was initially sentenced to life imprisonment, but was executed after additional charges were brought, while Dutt was also sentenced to life but was later released.
Reichstag fire	27 February 1933	Nazi Germany	Arson attack on the Reichstag building, home of the German parliament in Berlin. The day after the fire, the Reichstag Fire Decree was passed. The Nazi Party used the fire as a pretext to claim that communists were plotting against the German government, which made the fire pivotal in the establishment of Nazi Germany.
6 February 1934 crisis	6 February 1934	France	Violent demonstrations outside the Palais Bourbon by members of far-right groups in opposition to the coalition government of Édouard Daladier, resulting in the deaths of 15 demonstrators at the hands of police.
The Blitz	10–11 May 1941	United Kingdom	A nighttime bombing raid by the Luftwaffe on London saw the Houses of Parliament on the Palace of Westminster hit 12 times, killing Resident Superintendent of the House of Lords, Edward Elliott, and two policemen, and causing a fire that destroyed the House of Commons chamber.
1943 Lebanese demonstrations	22 November 1943	Lebanon	Demonstrators stormed the Lebanese parliament in protest after the arrest of Prime Minister Riad Al Solh, President Bechara El Khoury, Camille Chamoun, and other personalities by Free French troops.
Levant Crisis	29 May 1945	Syria	French troops stormed the Syrian parliament and tried to arrest President Shukri al-Quwatli and Speaker Saadallah al-Jabiri but both managed to escape. The French burned and bombarded the building.
1950 Haitian coup d'état	8 May 1950	Haiti	During a constitutional crisis between President Dumarsais Estimé and the Senate, a pro-Estimé mob invaded the Senate, completely destroyed it, and looted its items as trophies. Faced with this situation, the Haitian army intervened with a coup.
Israel reparations protests	7 January 1952	Israel	Protesters critical of the Reparations Agreement between Israel and West Germany led by future Prime Minister Menachem Begin threw stones at the Frumin House in Jerusalem, then the seat of the Knesset, one of which smashed through a window and injured MK Hanan Rubin.
1954 United States Capitol shooting	1 March 1954	United States	Four Puerto Rican nationalists wanting Puerto Rico's independence shot 30 rounds from semi-automatic pistols from the Ladies' Gallery (a balcony for visitors) of the House of Representatives chamber in the United States Capitol.
Frumin House bombing	29 October 1957	Israel	Moshe Dwek entered Frumin House and lobbed a grenade into the Knesset chamber which exploded. Among those injured were the Minister of Transportation, Moshe Carmel, the Minister of Religion, Haim-Moshe Shapira, Prime Minister David Ben-Gurion and Foreign Minister Golda Meir. Dwek, who claimed to have had a grudge against the Jewish Agency and the Israeli Supreme Court was sentenced to 15 years in prison. The incident led to the creation of the Knesset's own security apparatus, the Knesset Guard.
15 June Incident	15 June 1960	Japan	Hundreds of thousands of protestors opposed to the Treaty of Mutual Cooperation and Security between the United States and Japan marching on the National Diet building in Tokyo were attacked by right-wing counter-demonstrators with wooden staves and trucks, before leftist Zengakuren members breached the Diet building, provoking an hours-long battle with police and leading to the death of one Zengakuren activist.
Parliament of Canada failed bomb plot	18 May 1966	Canada	Paul Joseph Chartier died when a bomb he was preparing exploded in a washroom of the Parliament of Canada. It is believed that he was preparing to bomb the House of Commons.
1971 United States Capitol bombing	1 March 1971	United States	The Weather Underground set off a bomb in the United States Capitol causing an estimated $300,000 in damage.
1974 Houses of Parliament bombing	17 June 1974	United Kingdom	The Provisional IRA bombed the British Houses of Parliament, causing extensive damage and injuring eleven people.
Storming of the National Palace	22–24 August 1978	Nicaragua	During the Nicaraguan Revolution, Sandinista rebels led by Eden Pastora seized the National Palace in Managua while during a session of Congress, taking 2,000 hostages. Pastora demanded money, the release of Sandinista prisoners, and, "a means of publicizing the Sandinista cause." After two days, the government of Anastasio Somoza Debayle agreed to pay $500,000 and to release certain prisoners, ending the siege.
Assassination of Airey Neave	30 March 1979	United Kingdom	Airey Neave, British Shadow Secretary of State for Northern Ireland, was assassinated by the Irish National Liberation Army with a bomb fixed under his car. The bomb detonated in the car park of the Palace of Westminster in London and mortally wounded Neave, who died shortly after being admitted to hospital.
1981 Spanish coup d'état attempt	23 February 1981	Spain	Lieutenant-Colonel Antonio Tejero led 200 armed Civil Guard officers into the Congress of Deputies during the vote to elect a President of the Government. The officers held the parliamentarians and ministers hostage for 18 hours, during which time King Juan Carlos I denounced the coup in a televised address, calling for rule of law and the democratic government to continue. Though shots were fired, the hostage-takers surrendered the next morning without killing anyone.
1983 United States Senate bombing	7 November 1983	United States	Bomb explosion at the United States Senate motivated by U.S. military involvement in Lebanon and Grenada.
National Assembly of Quebec shooting	8 May 1984	Canada	Denis Lortie, a former Canadian Forces corporal, stormed into the building housing the National Assembly of Quebec and opened fire with several firearms, killing three Quebec government employees and wounding 13 others.
1987 Fijian coups d'état	14 May 1987	Fiji	Hardline I-Taukei soldiers led by Lieutenant Colonel Sitiveni Rabuka entered the House of Representatives in Suva and ordered the eviction of Prime Minister Timoci Bavadra and all MPs inside before announcing their takeover of the government
1987 grenade attack in the Sri Lankan Parliament	18 August 1987	Sri Lanka	An assailant hurled two grenades into a room where Members of Parliament were meeting. The grenades bounced off the table at which President J. R. Jayawardene and Prime Minister Ranasinghe Premadasa were sitting, and rolled away. A Member of Parliament and a ministry secretary were killed by the explosions. The attacks are attributed to the Janatha Vimukthi Peramuna, a Sinhalese nationalist militant organization.
1989 Parliament Hill hijacking and hostage incident	7 April 1989	Canada	On the Champlain Bridge near Montreal, Charles Yacoub used a gun to hijack a Greyhound Montreal to New York City intercity bus, taking the driver and passengers hostage and ordering the bus to Parliament Hill in Ottawa. A hostage standoff ensued on the lawn of the legislature for several hours. Yacoub released the remaining hostages and surrendered to police that evening. He later stated his goal was to draw attention to civilian deaths in the Lebanese Civil War.
Intermovement storming	15 May 1990	Estonia	Intermovement (a hardline, anti-Perestroika, pro-Soviet organisation consisting mostly of ethnic Russians) held a mass gathering in front of Toompea Castle in the capital Tallinn, breaking into the courtyard and escalating into an attempt to take over the parliament building; although they failed to reach the chambers. Prime Minister of the Interim Estonian Government, Edgar Savisaar, asked people to defend the legislature in a radio call. Thousands of Estonians responded, assembled by the parliament building and forced the unarmed anti-independence protesters to leave the site after some three hours with no reported significant injuries. An estimated 5,000 people took part in the storming of the legislature.
Jamaat al Muslimeen coup attempt	27 July–1 August 1990	Trinidad and Tobago	Members of the radical Islamist group Jamaat al Muslimeen tried to overthrow the government and seized media outlets and the Red House, the seat of the country's Parliament in Port-of-Spain, taking Prime Minister A. N. R. Robinson hostage along with most of his cabinet. Robinson was shot and injured by the insurgents, while MP Leo Des Vignes later died of his injuries. The takeover ended on 1 August after the rebels, who had been isolated by the army, agreed to surrender in exchange for an amnesty.
1991–92 Georgian coup d'état	22 December 1991 to 6 January 1992	Georgia	Paramilitary forces attacked, besieged and finally captured the Georgian Parliament building in Tbilisi, leading to the fall of President Zviad Gamsakhurdia.
1993 Russian constitutional crisis	4 October 1993	Russia	Political stand-off between Russian president Boris Yeltsin and the Russian legislature that was resolved by military force. The relations between the president and the parliament had been deteriorating for some time, reached its crisis on 21 September, when Yeltsin intended to dissolve the country's highest body (Congress of People's Deputies) and parliament (Supreme Soviet). On 3 October, demonstrators removed police cordons around the parliament and, urged by their leaders, took over the Mayor's offices and tried to storm the Ostankino television centre. The Russian Army, which had initially declared its neutrality, stormed the Russian White House in the early morning hours of 4 October by Yeltsin's order, and arrested the leaders of the resistance.
Santiagueñazo	16-17 December 1993	Argentina	State employees rioting over unpaid wages stormed government buildings in Santiago del Estero and set them on fire, including the provincial Chamber of Deputies.
Rwandan Civil War	6 April-4 July 1994	Rwanda	At the beginning of the Rwandan Genocide, the building housing the Transitional National Assembly of Rwanda, which also hosted a garrison of the Rwandan Patriotic Army that was stationed there to protect representatives of the Rwandan Patriotic Front participating in peace negotiations, was besieged by the Rwandan Armed Forces and Hutu genocidaires. Despite this, the building became a refuge for Tutsis fleeing the genocide until the RPF captured Kigali and relieved the garrison.
1993–1995 Salvadoran legislature attacks	26–28 September 1994	El Salvador	Former soldiers of the Armed Forces of El Salvador stormed the Legislative Assembly of El Salvador and took legislators hostage. They demanded indemnities be paid for their service during the Salvadoran Civil War (1979–1992) as well as an allocation of land.
1993–1995 Salvadoran legislature attacks	24–26 January 1995	El Salvador	Former soldiers of the Armed Forces of El Salvador stormed the Legislative Assembly of El Salvador and took legislators hostage. They demanded indemnities be paid for their service during the Salvadoran Civil War (1979–1992) as well as an allocation of land.
1996 Parliament House riot	19 August 1996	Australia	Attack on Parliament House, Canberra, when protesters broke away from the "Cavalcade to Canberra" rally organised by the Australian Council of Trade Unions (ACTU) and sought to force their way into the national Parliament, causing property damage and attacking police.
Fall of Suharto	17–22 May 1998	Indonesia	Up to 2,000 students occupied the People's Representative Council demanding an end to the 32-year dictatorship of President Suharto. After he resigned on 21 May, the students were evicted by the army without serious injury.
1998 United States Capitol shooting	24 July 1998	United States	Attack that led to the deaths of two United States Capitol Police officers. Officer Jacob Chestnut and Detective John Gibson were killed when Russell Eugene Weston Jr., entered the Capitol and opened fire. Weston's exact motives are unknown, but he had expressed a strong distrust of the federal government of the United States. As of July 2018, Weston, diagnosed with paranoid schizophrenia, remained in a mental institution.
Armenian parliament shooting	27 October 1999	Armenia	Attack on the National Assembly in Yerevan by a group of five armed men led by Nairi Hunanyan that, among others, killed the two de facto decision-makers in the country's political leadership—Prime Minister Vazgen Sargsyan and Parliament Speaker Karen Demirchyan.
2000 Fijian coup d'état	19 May-13 July 2000	Fiji	Hardline I-Taukeis led by George Speight stormed the country's parliament and took Prime Minister Mahendra Chaudhry and all but one member of his cabinet hostage. During captivity, Chaudhry was removed from office on 27 May by President Kamisese Mara, who was in turn deposed in a coup on 29 May by Commodore Frank Bainimarama, commander of the Royal Fiji Military Forces. Although hostages were gradually released, the ensuing standoff created a political crisis that ended with Speight releasing the remaining hostages in exchange for an amnesty and the accession of Josefa Iloilo to the presidency on 13 July.
Overthrow of Slobodan Milošević	5 October 2000	Federal Republic of Yugoslavia	Protesters demanding the resignation of President Slobodan Milošević stormed the Federal Assembly in Belgrade, smashing glass, throwing documents from windows and setting several fires on the ground floor despite police firing tear gas from inside the building.

== 21st century ==
Attack	Date	Country	Details
Zug massacre	27 September 2001	Switzerland	Friedrich Leibacher shot dead 14 people in the cantonal parliament in Zug before killing himself.
2001 Jammu and Kashmir legislative assembly car bombing	1 October 2001	India	Three militants belonging to Jaish-e-Mohammed carried out an attack on the Jammu and Kashmir State Legislative Assembly complex in Srinagar using a Tata Sumo loaded with explosives, ramming it into the main gate with three fidayeen suicide bombers. 38 people and three fidayeen were killed in this attack.
2001 Indian Parliament attack	13 December 2001	India	Gun attack on the Parliament of India in New Delhi. The perpetrators belonged to Lashkar-e-Taiba (LeT) and Jaish-e-Mohammed (JeM). The attack killed ten people and led to increased tensions between India and Pakistan, resulting in the 2001–02 India–Pakistan standoff. The five assailants were killed outside the parliament.
2001 Odisha Assembly attack	16 December 2001	India	High-profile attack by Bajrang Dal, Vishwa Hindu Parishad and Durga Vahini on the Odisha State Legislative Assembly complex in Bhubaneswar.
2007 Iraqi Parliament bombing	12 April 2007	Iraq	The canteen of the Council of Representatives of Iraq building in Baghdad was attacked by a suicide bomber who had breached the Green Zone. The canteen was on the same floor as the main debating chamber. MP Mohammed Awad al-Jibouri of the National Dialogue Front, was killed in the attack; 23 others were injured, including 5 MPs from the Iraqi Accord Front, 3 MPs from the United Iraq Alliance, and 3 MPs from Muqtada al-Sadr's list.
Batasang Pambansa bombing	13 November 2007	Philippines	Bombing that occurred in front of the House of Representatives in Quezon City. The blast killed Congressman Wahab Akbar and Marcial Taldo, a staff member of Congresswoman Luzviminda Ilagan, and wounded Ilagan, Congressman Pryde Henry Teves, and two others.
2010 Kyrgyz Revolution	7 April 2010	Kyrgyzstan	Opposition leaders and demonstrators led by Omurbek Tekebayev stormed the Jogorku Kenesh building in Bishkek demanding the overthrow of President Kurmanbek Bakiyev.
2010 Chechen Parliament attack	19 October 2010	Russia	Three Chechen militants attacked the parliament complex in Grozny, the capital of the Chechen Republic, a federal subject of Russia. At least six people were killed, including two police officers, one parliament employee and all three suicide commandos.
Tripoli protests	21 February 2011	Libya	Protesters demanding the overthrow of Muammar Gaddafi set fire to the People's Hall housing the General People's Congress in Tripoli.
2013 occupation of the Brazilian Congress	16 April 2013	Brazil	Amid a wave of social unrest in Brazil, indigenous demonstrators representing some 70 indigenous tribes occupied the Chamber of Deputies in Brasília. A similar attempt by several hundred indigenous demonstrators to storm Congress on October 2, 2013 was halted by police using pepper spray.
2013 protests in Brazil	17 June 2013	Brazil	Protesters occupied the Rio de Janeiro State Legislative Chamber in Rio de Janeiro city, causing riot police to be called in. Three protesters were injured by gunfire, reportedly by police forces, while ten others were hospitalized.
Capture of the Crimean Parliament	27 February 2014	Ukraine	During the early phase of the Russian annexation of Crimea, Russian special forces in unmarked uniforms entered the building of the Verkhovna Rada of Crimea and took control of it.
Sunflower Student Movement	18 March 2014	Taiwan	Opponents of the Cross-Strait Service Trade Agreement with the People's Republic of China that was passed by skipping through certain procedures occupied the offices of the Legislative Yuan until April 10, when the parliamentary leadership agreed to a more thorough review of the agreement.
2014 shootings at Parliament Hill, Ottawa	22 October 2014	Canada	At the Canadian National War Memorial, Corporal Nathan Cirillo, a Canadian soldier and reservist on ceremonial sentry duty was fatally shot by Michael Zehaf-Bibeau. Zehaf-Bibeau then entered the nearby Centre Block parliament building, where members of the Parliament of Canada were attending caucuses. After wrestling with a constable at the entrance, Zehaf-Bibeau ran inside and had a shootout with parliament security personnel. He was shot 31 times by six officers and died on scene.
2014 Burkina Faso uprising	30 October 2014	Burkina Faso	A crowd of about 1,500 demonstrators protesting against plans by President Blaise Compaoré to extend his rule stormed the National Assembly building in Ouagadougou and set the structure on fire along with documents and nearby cars, while stealing computer equipment.
2016 Turkish coup attempt	15–16 July 2016	Turkey	Putschists bombed the Grand National Assembly Building in Ankara from the air.
2016 Gabonese parliament attack	31 August 2016	Gabon	Protesters demonstrating against President Ali Bongo Ondimba's reelection victory in the 2016 Gabonese presidential election entered the back of the National Assembly building in Libreville and set part of the structure on fire.
2016 Brazilian Congress attack	16 November 2016	Brazil	Around 60 protesters demanding a military coup to overturn the Brazilian government broke a glass door and entered the Chamber of Deputies at the National Congress Palace in Brasília; they violently clashed with guards before being dispersed by police after three hours.
2017 Westminster attack	22 March 2017	United Kingdom	Terrorist attack took place outside the Palace of Westminster in London, seat of the British Parliament. The attacker drove a car into pedestrians on the pavement along the south side of Westminster Bridge and Bridge Street, injuring more than 50 people, four of them fatally. He then crashed the car into the perimeter fence of the palace grounds and ran into New Palace Yard, where he fatally stabbed an unarmed police officer. He was then shot by an armed police officer, and died at the scene.
2017 Paraguayan crisis	31 March 2017	Paraguay	As a response to a constitutional amendment that would permit President Horacio Cartes to run for re-election, protests broke out in Asunción against the legislation. During the protests, the windows were broken and Congress was set on fire by protesters. Fencing surrounding the compound was also removed. Police used water cannons, tear gas and rubber bullets to disperse the demonstrators.
2017 storming of Macedonian Parliament	27 April 2017	Macedonia	About 200 Macedonian nationalists (some of whom were members and sympathizers of VMRO-DPMNE) stormed the Macedonian Parliament in Skopje in reaction to the election of Talat Xhaferi, an ethnic Albanian, as Speaker.
2017 Tehran attacks	7 June 2017	Iran	Two simultaneous terrorist attacks carried out by five members of the Islamic State of Iraq and the Levant (ISIL) against the Iranian Parliament building and the Mausoleum of Ruhollah Khomeini, both in Tehran, leaving 17 civilians dead and 43 wounded.
2017 Venezuelan National Assembly attack	5 July 2017	Venezuela	Colectivos and supporters of President Nicolás Maduro stormed the Palacio Federal Legislativo in Caracas on the Independence Day of Venezuela, assaulting many members of the opposition-led National Assembly. At least 12 opposition legislators and their staff were injured as a result of the attack.
APEC Papua New Guinea 2018	20 November 2018	Papua New Guinea	Police and soldiers protesting unpaid allowances from the APEC summit held a few days prior stormed the National Parliament House in Port Moresby, damaging property and assaulting parliamentary staff before they were dispersing following promises by government ministers to release their payments.
Storming of the Legislative Council Complex	1 July 2019	Hong Kong	Siege, break-in, and subsequent occupation of the Legislative Council Complex by anti-government activists during the campaign to halt the enactment of the Fugitive Offenders amendment bill. Hundreds of protesters broke through the glass walls and metal doors and entered the building, ransacked and vandalised the interior with anti-government and anti-PRC slogans. It is considered a watershed event in the 2019–20 Hong Kong protests. Nine days later, on 9 July, the Chief Executive, Carrie Lam, announced that the extradition bill was "dead".
2019 Papua protests	19 August 2019	Indonesia	Demonstrators protesting against the arrest of separatist student activists set fire to the West Papua provincial parliament in Manokwari.
2019 South Korean Capitol attack	16 December 2019	South Korea	Supporters of the Liberty Korea Party and impeached former president Park Geun-hye assaulted police and lawmakers at the National Assembly Proceeding Hall in Seoul.
2020 Salvadoran political crisis	9 February 2020	El Salvador	President Nayib Bukele ordered 40 soldiers into the Legislative Assembly building during a vote to approve a $109 million loan for his security policies.
2020 Azerbaijan protests	14 July 2020	Azerbaijan	Protesters demonstrating against the death of military personnel during clashes with Armenia broke into the National Assembly building in Baku and caused minor damage.
Storming of the Reichstag	29 August 2020	Germany	Part of the COVID-19 protests in Germany: During a demonstration involving conspiracy ideologists, Reich citizens and right-wing extremists, around 400 people attempted to storm the Reichstag building in Berlin. Barriers were broken down, but the attempt failed due to efforts by the security forces present.
2020 Kyrgyz Revolution	6 October 2020	Kyrgyzstan	Protesters demonstrating against electoral fraud during parliamentary elections held on 4 October and demanding the resignation of President Sooronbay Jeenbekov stormed the Jogorku Kenesh building in Bishkek, scattering papers and setting parts of the building on fire.
2020 storming of the Armenian Parliament	10 November 2020	Armenia	Protesters demonstrating against Armenia's defeat in the Second Nagorno-Karabakh War and demanding the resignation of Prime Minister Nikol Pashinyan stormed the National Assembly, making speeches in the main hall and destroying equipment in some offices before being escorted out by police.
2020 Guatemalan protests	21 November 2020	Guatemala	Hundreds of anti-government protesters vandalized and set fire to parts of the empty Congress building, before being dispersed by riot police after about ten minutes. The attack came amid protests against a budget bill presented by President Alejandro Giammattei that was approved by the legislature.
Oregon State Capitol breach	21 December 2020	United States	A group of armed protesters breached the Oregon State Capitol in opposition to health restrictions related to the COVID-19 pandemic in Oregon.
January 6 United States Capitol attack	6 January 2021	United States	Riot and insurrection against the United States Congress, carried out by a mob of supporters of U.S. President Donald Trump in an attempt to overturn his defeat in the 2020 presidential election. After Trump spoke to a crowd, his supporters marched down Pennsylvania Avenue to the Capitol, where a joint session of Congress was beginning the Electoral College vote count. Many of the crowd breached police perimeters, attacked U.S. Capitol Police officers, and stormed the building in an attempt to prevent the counting of the electoral votes, which formalized President-elect Joe Biden's election victory. Ashli Babbitt, one of the rioters, was shot and killed by a Capitol police officer while attempting to breach the House chamber. Capitol Police officer Brian Sicknick died the following day after suffering multiple strokes. Among the participants in the domestic terrorist attack were members and supporters of right-wing extremist groups, including the Proud Boys, Oath Keepers, and Three Percenters. Hundreds of participants were convicted of federal crimes for their roles in the January 6 insurrection, including crimes of violence against police and with criminal conspiracy. Several leaders, including Elmer Stewart Rhodes and Enrique Tarrio, were convicted of seditious conspiracy.
April 2021 United States Capitol car attack	2 April 2021	United States	A delusional man rammed a car into a barricade outside of the United States Capitol. The perpetrator and a police officer were killed, and another officer was injured.
2022 Parliament of South Africa fire	2 January 2022	South Africa	At 5:00 am, a 49 year-old man started a fire on the third floor of the National Council of Provinces building which spread to several other parts of the parliamentary complex, causing significant damage before being extinguished. The suspect later claimed he wanted to prevent President Cyril Ramaphosa from delivering his annual State of the Nation address, and to demand his resignation.
2022 Wellington protests	6 February – 2 March 2022	New Zealand	Anti vaccine and anti mandate protesters combined with far right extremists occupied the grounds of the New Zealand Parliament for 24 days. Tents were set up, Parliament grounds were dug up in what culminated on 2 March into a confrontation between police and protesters that turned violent. Tents and the parliamentary playground was set alight. 40 police officers were injured when paving bricks among other objects were used against police who were conducting a tactical operation to end the occupation.
2022 Iraq parliament attack	27 July 2022	Iraq	Supporters of Iraqi cleric Muqtada al-Sadr stormed the Council of Representatives of Iraq in protest of the proposal to appoint Mohammed Shia' Al Sudani as prime minister of Iraq. The protestors left the parliament after al-Sadr called upon the protestors to "pray and go home".
2023 Brazilian Congress attack	8 January 2023	Brazil	Supporters of former president Jair Bolsonaro stormed the National Congress, along with other top-level government buildings on the Praça dos Três Poderes, demanding the resignation or removal of recently-inaugurated president Luiz Inácio Lula da Silva.
Storming of the Nuevo Leon State Congress	29 November 2023	Mexico	Protesters demonstrating against the appointment of a replacement for outgoing Nuevo Leon state governor Samuel García entered the state congress in Monterrey and set off a smoke bomb inside the chamber.
2023 Indian Parliament breach	13 December 2023	India	Two antigovernment protestors jumped from the visitors’ gallery of the Lok Sabha into the MPs’ seating area carrying small canisters that emitted yellow smoke before being apprehended along with two accomplices by MPs, parliamentary security guards and Delhi police.
2024 storming of the Kenyan Parliament	25 June 2024	Kenya	The Parliament Building in Nairobi was set on fire after protesters demonstrating against a finance bill entered the complex.
July Revolution (Bangladesh)	5 August 2024	Bangladesh	The Jatiya Sangsad Bhaban housing the Parliament of Bangladesh in Dhaka was stormed by protesters demanding the resignation of Prime Minister Sheikh Hasina.
2024 Mexican judicial reform protests	10–11 September 2024	Mexico	On 10 September 2024, protesters opposing the judicial reform bill that would require all judges to be directly elected stormed the Senate building in Mexico City. The next day, as state legislatures convened to ratify the reform, demonstrators stormed legislative buildings in Yucatán, Baja California, and Puebla, resulting in the postponement or suspension of legislative sessions in those states.
2024 Abkhazian protests	15 November 2024	Georgia (occupied territory, partially recognized Abkhazia)	Protesters demonstrating against an agreement allowing greater investment by Russians stormed the People's Assembly building in Sukhumi and occupied the chamber, while a vehicle rammed the complex's gates. At least two people were injured. On 19 November, Abkhazian president Aslan Bzhania resigned as part of an agreement for protesters to leave the building.
2024 South Korean martial law crisis	3–4 December 2024	South Korea	Soldiers stormed the National Assembly Proceeding Hall in Seoul in an unsuccessful attempt to prevent lawmakers from convening overnight to strike down the declaration of martial law by President Yoon Suk Yeol, sparking clashes with parliamentary staff.
August 2025 Indonesian protests	29 August 2025	Indonesia	The headquarters of the South Sulawesi Regional House of Representatives in Makassar was set on fire during an antigovernment protest, killing three people.
2025 Nepalese Gen Z protests	9 September 2025	Nepal	The headquarters of the Federal Parliament of Nepal in Kathmandu was set on fire during an antigovernment protest.
	8 January 2026	Honduras	An unidentified assailant threw an explosive device during a press briefing by National Party deputies at an outdoor hallway of the National Congress of Honduras, injuring deputy Gladis Aurora López Calderón after she was hit on the back by the projectile.
2026 Philippine Senate lockdown	13 May 2026	Philippines	The Senate of the Philippines building in Pasay was placed under lockdown after gunshots were reported during a standoff involving Senator Ronald dela Rosa amid attempts by authorities to serve an arrest warrant linked to an International Criminal Court investigation.

== See also ==
- Legislative violence
- List of attacks on high courts
