= Pierre Jalbert =

Canadian skier, actor, and motion picture film and sound editor (1925–2014)

- Born: Joseph Jacques Pierre-Paul Jalbert; 9 January 1925; Quebec City, Quebec, Canada
- Died: 22 January 2014 (aged 89); Los Angeles, California, U.S.
- Years active: 1955–1990
- Spouse: Joy Lee

Joseph Jacques Pierre-Paul Jalbert (9 January 1925 – 22 January 2014), or known simply as Pierre Jalbert, was a Canadian skier, actor, and motion picture film and sound editor, primarily known for his role as "Caje" on the US television 1960s World War II program Combat!.

== Early life ==
Jalbert was born in Quebec City, Quebec, the son of a newspaperman. He graduated from Ouellet College and attended Laval University, where he was part of the university Royal Canadian Air Cadets during World War II.

== Skiing career ==
He was both Canada's Junior and Senior National Ski Champion. In 1948, he was the Captain of Canada's Olympic Ski Team at St. Moritz, but due to breaking his leg in a fall during a practice run, he never skied in the Games. After the Olympics, he was involved with the National Film Board of Canada. Eventually he moved to the United States and worked as a ski instructor at Sun Valley, Idaho, in the 1950s.

== Editing and acting career ==
In 1952, he went to Hollywood looking for a job, and found employment as a film editor at MGM.

In 1961, at the urging of an agent friend, he auditioned for and got the part of bilingual Cajun PFC Paul "Caje" Le May in the ABC World War II dramatic TV series Combat!. After the show's cancellation in 1967, Jalbert had a few other acting roles before returning to his editing career. Pierre worked on The Godfather, including the famous baptism intercut sequence at the climax of the movie. He was nominated for an Emmy Award for sound editing for the 1981 miniseries Shōgun. He retired in 1990.

== Personal information ==
He is the brother of René Marc Jalbert, the sergeant-at-arms of Quebec's legislature whose bravery saved lives during Denis Lortie's 1984 attack on that institution. He was married to Joy Lee, a ballerina and interior designer who appeared in the films Son of Sinbad and Love is a Many-Splendored Thing.

== Death ==
Pierre Jalbert died in Los Angeles on 22 January 2014. He had been in the hospital since suffering a heart attack on his 89th birthday, two weeks prior.

== Filmography (actor) ==
Year	Title	Role	Notes
1955	Ski Crazy!	Psychiatrist	
1962–1967	Combat!	PFC Paul "Caje" LeMay	115 episodes
1967	Mission: Impossible	Paul Lebarre	1 episode
1968	The Virginian	Jules	1 episode
1969	The Name of the Game	Dr. Nieves	1 episode
1969	Footprints on the Moon- Apollo 11	Jules Verne	Voice (Re-released in 2009 on DVD for the 40th anniversary of the first Moon landing)
1971	Night Gallery	Andrea Doria Officer of the watch	
1971	The Ski Bum	Roger	
1974	The Richard Petty Story	Curtis Cross	
1978	Ski Lift to Death	Clevenger	TV movie
1979	The Concorde... Airport '79	Henri	
1983	Good-bye, Cruel World	Pierre	
