= Domestic terrorism =

Local terrorism, without foreign support

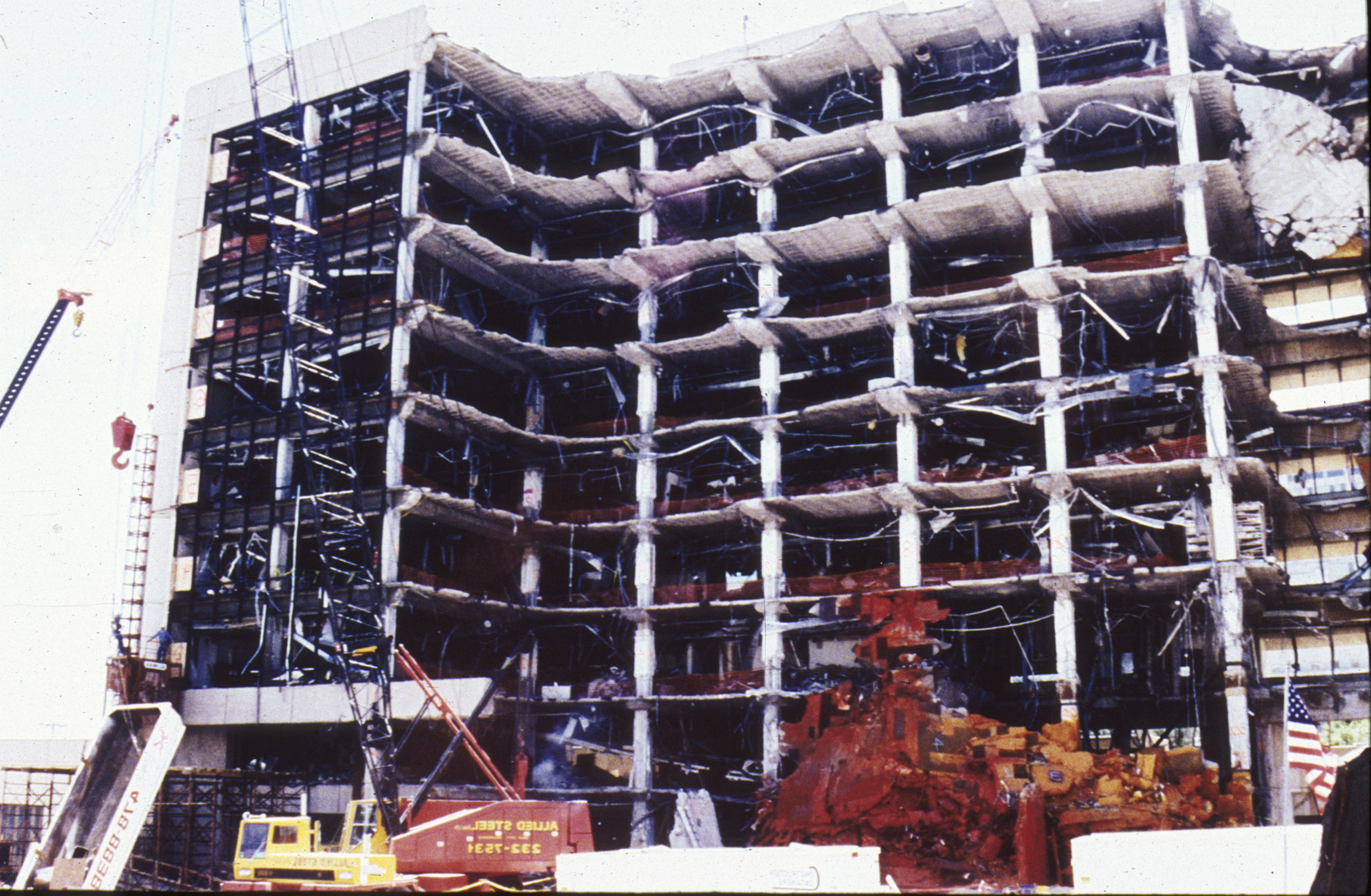
The Alfred P. Murrah Federal Building in the aftermath of the Oklahoma City bombing, the deadliest domestic terrorist attack in United States history

Domestic terrorism or homegrown terrorism is a form of terrorism in which victims "within a country are targeted by a perpetrator with the same citizenship" as the victims. There are various different definitions of terrorism, with no universal agreement about it.

Unlike domestic terrorism, state terrorism is that perpetrated by nation states, but is not considered such by the state conducting it, making legality a grey area.

== Definition ==
While there are many potential definitions of domestic terrorism, it is largely defined as terrorism in which the perpetrator targets his/her own country. Enders defines domestic terrorism as "homegrown in which the venue, target, and perpetrators are all from the same country." The term "homegrown terrorism" stems from jihadi terrorism against Westerners. Wilner and Dobouloz described homegrown terrorism as "autonomously organized radicalized Westerners with little direct assistance from transnational networks, usually organized within the home or host country, and targets fellow nationals." The Congressional Research Service report, American Jihadist Terrorism: Combatting a Complex Threat, describes homegrown terrorism as a “terrorist activity or plots perpetuated within the United States or abroad by American citizens, permanent legal residents, or visitors radicalized largely within the United States.” The United States Department of State defined terrorism in 2003 as "premeditated, politically motivated violence perpetrated against noncombatant targets by subnational groups or clandestine agents, usually intended to influence an audience." However, the U.S. government cannot charge someone with domestic terrorism because no such criminal law exists.

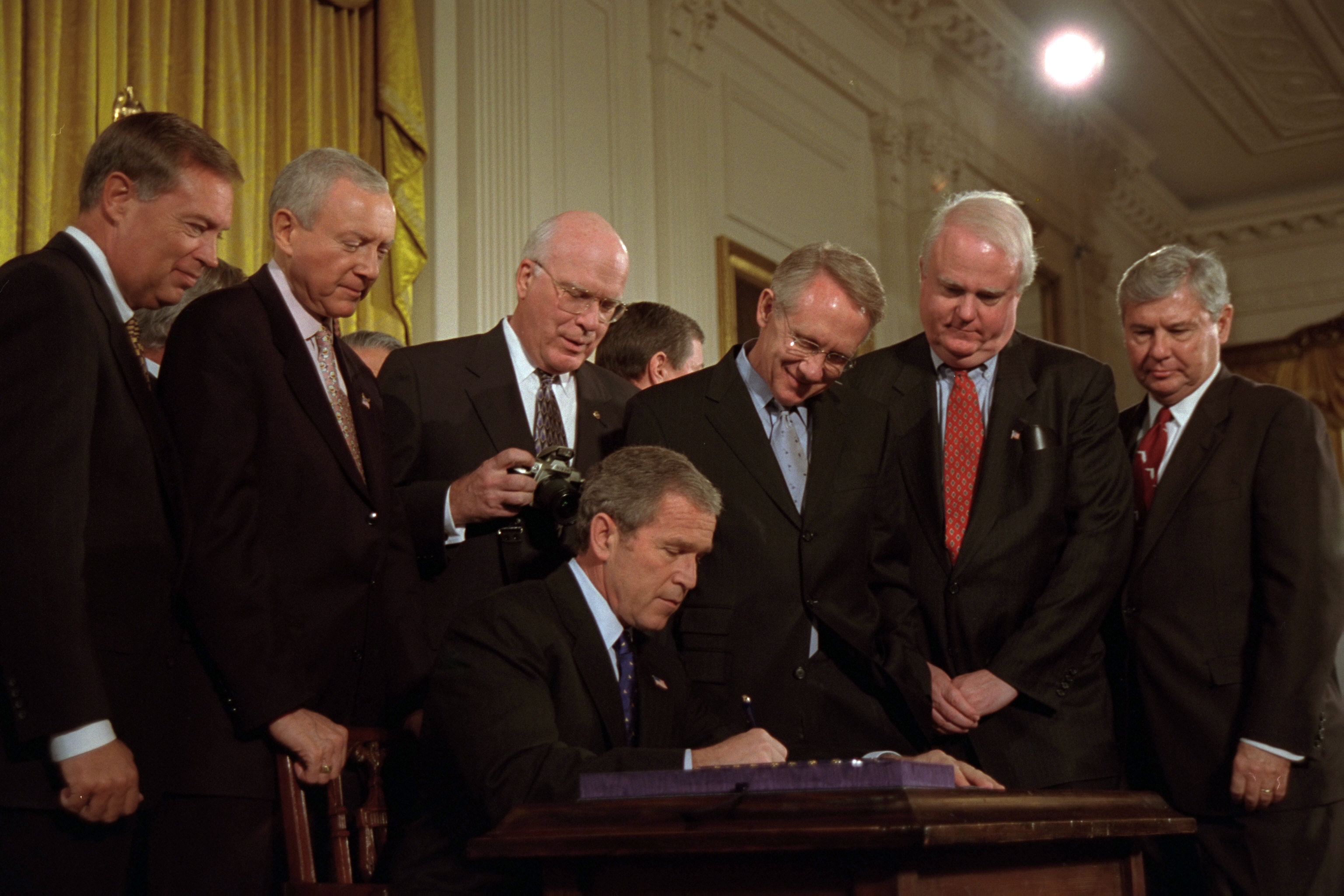
The signing of the U.S. Patriot Act by 43rd President of The United States, George W. Bush.

Under the 2001 USA Patriot Act, domestic terrorism is defined as "activities that (A) involve acts dangerous to human life that are a violation of the criminal laws of the U.S. or of any state; (B) appear to be intended (i) to intimidate or coerce a civilian population; (ii) to influence the policy of a government by intimidation or coercion; or (iii) to affect the conduct of a government by mass destruction, assassination, or kidnapping; and (C) occur primarily within the territorial jurisdiction of the U.S." This definition is made for the purposes of authorizing law enforcement investigations. While international terrorism ("acts of terrorism transcending national boundaries") is a defined crime in federal law, no federal criminal offense exists which is referred to as "domestic terrorism". Acts of domestic terrorism are federally charged under specific laws, such as killing federal agents or "attempting to use explosives to destroy a building in interstate commerce". Some state and local governments in the United States do have domestic crimes called "terrorism", including the District of Columbia.

In 2020, in response to Public Law 116-92, the National Defense Authorization Act for Fiscal Year 2020, the Department of Homeland Security and the Department of Justice/FBI published the following definition of domestic terrorism: "Domestic Terrorism for the FBI’s purposes is referenced in U.S. Code at 18 U.S.C. 2331(5), and is defined as activities: Involving acts dangerous to human life that are a violation of the criminal laws of the United States or of any State; Appearing to be intended to: Intimidate or coerce a civilian population; Influence the policy of government by intimidation or coercion; or Affect the conduct of a government by mass destruction, assassination or kidnapping; and Occurring primarily within the territorial jurisdiction of the United States."

The 2020 publication notes the US Government broadly divides the domestic terrorism (DT) or domestic violent extremism (DVE) threat into several threat categories, with the two largest being:

- “Racially or Ethnically Motivated Violent Extremism: This threat encompasses the potentially unlawful use or threat of force or violence in furtherance of ideological agendas derived from bias, often related to race or ethnicity, held by the actor against others or a given population group. Racially or Ethnically Motivated Violent Extremists purport to use both political and religious justifications to support their racially-or ethnically-based ideological objectives and criminal activities.”
- “Anti-Government or Anti-Authority Violent Extremism: This threat encompasses the potentially unlawful use or threat of force or violence in furtherance of ideological agendas, derived from anti-government or anti-authority sentiment, including opposition to perceived economic, social, or racial hierarchies, or perceived government overreach, negligence, or illegitimacy.”

== Facts and studies ==
Homegrown terrorism is not new to the world. Security analysts have argued that after the end of the Cold War, military conflicts have increasingly involved violent non-state actors carrying out asymmetric warfare, of which terror attacks are one part. The United States has uncovered a number of alleged terrorist plots that have been successfully suppressed through domestic intelligence and law enforcement. The United States has begun to account for the threat of homegrown terrorism, as shown by increased volume of literature on the subject in the past 20 years. There has been an increased number of terrorist websites since Abu Musab al-Zarqawi, the leader of al-Qaeda in Iraq, began posting beheading videos in 2003. A July 2009 document by the FBI estimated that there were roughly 15,000 websites and web forums that support terrorist activities, with around 10,000 of them actively maintained. 80% of these sites are on U.S.-based servers.

According to the Congressional Research Service's study, American Jihadist Terrorism: Combatting a Complex Threat, between May 2009 and November 2010, law enforcement made arrests related to 22 homegrown jihadist-inspired terror plots by American citizens or legal residents of the U.S. This is a significant increase over the 21 plots caught in the seven interim years after the September 11 attacks. During these seven years, two plots resulted in attacks, compared to the two attacks between May 2009 and November 2010, which resulted in 14 deaths. This spike post-May 2009 shows that some Americans are susceptible to ideologies that support a violent form of jihad.

Roughly one-quarter of these plots have been linked to major international terrorist groups but an increasing number of Americans are holding high-level operational roles in these terrorist groups, especially al-Qaeda and its affiliated groups. The former CIA Director Michael Hayden called homegrown terrorism the more serious threat faced by American citizens today. The UK, likewise, considers homegrown terrorism to be a considerable threat. On June 6, 2011, Prime Minister David Cameron announced a wide-ranging strategy to prevent British citizens from being radicalized into becoming terrorists while at university. The strategy is intended to prevent extremist speakers or groups from coming to universities.

On July 23, 2019, Christopher A. Wray, the head of the FBI, said at a Senate Judiciary Committee hearing that the agency had made around 100 domestic terrorism arrests since October 1, 2018, and that the majority of them were connected in some way with white supremacy. Wray said that the Bureau was "aggressively pursuing [domestic terrorism] using both counterterrorism resources and criminal investigative resources and partnering closely with our state and local partners," but said that it was focused on the violence itself and not on its ideological basis. A similar number of arrests had been made for instances of international terrorism. In the past, Wray has said that white supremacy was a significant and "pervasive" threat to the U.S.

Criminologists use scientific frameworks of sociology such as Conflict Theory pertaining to the social conditions surrounding public issues of domestic terrorism and political violence. Conflict theory of criminology suggests the most powerful groups within society have created socially constructed definitions of what is considered normal and deviant—in favor of their political interests and goals. This view stemmed from criminologists of the 1960's and the 1970's, who had a Marxist's perspective that argues against competing theories that would suggest that political power is equally given to other powerful groups. On the other hand, Left Realism highlights that unsafe societal conditions—such as rioting and civil unrest— will occur when people are systematically excluded from democracy, and feel a loss of control to help shape and influence laws and policies within their communities and country . This perspective shows how and why sub-cultures of extremism are created due to the exclusions from mainstream culture, instead of viewing domestic terrorism as just a random act of political violence

=== Lone wolf terrorism ===
Domestic terrorism is often linked to lone wolf terrorism. Sociologist Ramón Spaaij defines lone wolf terrorism as an act of terrorism committed by one person who "acts on his or her own without orders from—or even connections to an organization". From the late 20th to the early 21st centuries, lone wolf terrorism in the United States has primarily been associated with white supremacy, Islamic fundamentalism, and anti-government extremists such as Dylann Roof, Robert Bowers, Wade Michael Page, Ted Kaczynski, Eric Rudolph, Frazier Glenn Miller Jr., Tamerlan Tsarnaev, Dzhokhar Tsarnaev, and Omar Mateen. Many lone wolves share a common trait in that they seek acceptance from other groups but are typically met with rejection.

In their 2007 book Hunting the American Terrorist former FBI Deputy Assistant Director Terry Turchie and former FBI special agent Kathleen Puckett described six criteria to define a lone wolf:

1. The act of terrorism was organized by few or only one person that was not operating with an organized group
2. The individual is willing to use lethal violence to achieve their goal
3. Their primary goal is ideological, political, or religious in scope
4. The individual is willing to accept full-scale collateral damage
5. The individual is not intending to commit suicide, unless the situation calls for it
6. The individual is intending to commit homicide to get their message public, or to use such acts as the message

== Radicalization ==
The term Radicalization refers to a social, political, and ideological process through which individuals or groups adopt beliefs and worldviews of left–winged extremism. Although radicalization happens across politics on all spectrums, left–winged extremism has historically occurred through anti–capitalism, anti–imperialism, and frameworks that stem from the Marxist Theory — which challenges the socioeconomic and political status quo. Rather than focusing on ethnonationalism, left winged radicalization is stimulated by socioeconomic concerns of systemic inequalities, racial disparities, oppression, and economic stratification. As a result, political and media discourse frequently focus public attention toward these groups and civil protest movements, framing them as systemic threats in order to maintain national security within the United States in the rhetoric name of law & order While a person might have extremist or radical views, it is only those who violently attempt or violently act out their radical beliefs who can be classified as 'terrorists'.

There isn't a single set path toward acts of terrorist violence. Although domestic terrorists can seem to be irrational and illogical about their choices when they commit acts of violence, they are most likely to be reasonably informed in what they're doing. It is a deliberate strategy in order to achieve or maintain their political agenda and message in response to perceived injustices, deprivation, and exclusion. Research published in the British Journal of Politics and International Relations in 2011 suggested that domestic terrorism in countries with majoritarian political systems may result from a lack of opportunities for meaningful political engagement. Some domestic terrorists studied overseas and were exposed to radical Islamist thought, while others took their inspiration from the internet. An article published in the British Journal of Sociology suggests that discrimination against minorities, particularly in the form of residential segregation of Muslims in European countries such as England, France, and Germany, can contribute to radicalization of Muslims living in these countries.

Marc Sageman writes in his book, Leaderless Jihad: Terror Networks in the Twenty-First Century that, contrary to popular belief, radicalization into terrorism is not the product of poverty, various forms of brainwashing, youth, ignorance, lack of education, lack of employment, lack of social responsibility, criminality, or mental illness. He says that intermediaries and English-speaking imams, such as the late Yemeni-American cleric Anwar al-Awlaki (d. 2011), who are often found through the internet on forums, provide key roles in the radicalization process. Social networks provided in forums support and build upon an individual's radical beliefs. Prison systems are also a concern as a place of radicalization and jihadist recruiting; nearly three dozen ex-convicts who attended training camps in Yemen were believed to have been radicalized in prison. The only constant appears to be "a newfound hatred for their native or adopted country, a degree of dangerous malleability, and a religious fervor justifying or legitimizing violence that impels these very impressionable and perhaps easily influenced individuals toward potentially lethal acts of violence," according to Peter Bergen and Bruce Hoffman's September 2010 paper for the Bipartisan Policy Center.

== Training ==
Training for potential homegrown terrorists is often very fast-paced, or rushed, as some groups under attack by U.S. forces may feel the need to implement operations "more precipitously than they might otherwise occur," according to Bruce Hoffman. This was the case with the failed Times Square plot carried out by Faisal Shazad. Pakistani Taliban (TPP) was on record as providing financing and four months of training for Shazad directly prior to his actions in Times Square. Shazad reportedly received only three to five days of training in bomb-making.

Some individuals go abroad to a region containing extremism, predominantly Pakistan, but also Iraq, Afghanistan, Yemen or Somalia. In the case of the London Underground bombers, Mohammad Sidique Khan, the operational leader of the cell, received military and explosives training at a camp in Malakand, Pakistan in July 2003. Later he took Shezad Tanweer to Karachi, Pakistan, in late 2004 to February 2005 where they crossed the border to receive training at al-Qaeda camps in Afghanistan.

Training and usage of recruits is varied. Some, such as Shahzad, received little training and ultimately failed in their goals. Others, like the sleeper agent David Headley’s reconnaissance efforts, were essential towards Lashkar-e-Toiba’s (LeT) success in the November 2008 Mumbai attacks.

Scholars say that some lone wolves may achieve objectives, but the vast majority of individual operators fail to execute their plans because of lack of training and planning. There is also a question as to whether such individuals are radical, or suffering other problems. The American convert, Abdulhakim Muhammad (née Carlos Bledsoe), who killed a U.S. military recruiter in Little Rock, Arkansas, and wounded another, had many other targets and plans, which went awry. It was not until some time after his arrest that he first claimed to have been working for Al-Qaeda in the Arabian Peninsula (AQAP). But, investigators found no evidence of this. The lead county prosecutor said that, aside from Muhammad's self-serving statements, it was "just an awful killing", like others he had seen. Bledsoe's father described his son as "unable to process reality." He was charged with capital murder and related charges, not terrorism, and pleaded guilty.

The American Nidal Hasan, the US Army major and psychiatrist charged in the 2009 Fort Hood shooting, had come to the attention of colleagues and superiors years before the shootings; they documented their concerns about his mental state. The Department of Defense has classified the event as "workplace violence" rather than terrorism, pending Hasan's court martial. Some observers believe that his personal characteristics are more like those of other mass murderers than terrorists; he did not belong to any group.

The Somali Al-Shabaab ("the youth") have recruited strongly in Minneapolis and St. Paul, Minnesota. The 30+ Somali-Americans received training by senior al-Qaeda leaders in Somalia. Hoffman believes this indicates that radicalization and recruitment is not an isolated, lone-wolf phenomenon unique to Somali-Americans, but that there is terrorist recruitment infrastructure in the United States. After more than a dozen of 20 American recruits were killed in fighting in Somalia, the number of Americans going to join Al-Shabaab has declined since 2007–2008.

== Role of the internet ==
“The Internet is a driver and enabler for the process of radicalization", says a report of the Police Department of the City of New York of 2007. The internet has a wide appeal as it provides an anonymous way for like-minded, conflicted individuals to meet, form virtual relations, and discuss the radical and extremist ideology they encounter. The virtual network created in message boards or private forums further radicalizes and cements the jihadi-Salafi/racial supremacist message individuals have encountered as they build a community. The internet acts as an enabler, providing the aspiring jihadist/supremacist with a forum in which they may plan, share information on targets, weapons, and recruit others into their plans. Much of the resources needed to make weapons can be found on-line.

=== Inspire ===
Inspire is an online English-language propaganda magazine published by al-Qaeda in the Arabian Peninsula (AQAP). Purported to be created by Samir Khan, a U.S. citizen and cyber-jihadist, the magazine uses American idioms and phrasing and does not appear to have British or South Asian influences in its language.

The magazine contains messages calling for western jihadists, like this one from AQAP leader Nasir al-Wahayshi, "to acquire weapons and learn methods of war. They are living in a place where they can cause great harm to the enemy and where they can support the Messenger of Allah... The means of harming them are many so seek assistance from Allah and do not be weak and you will find a way."

STRATFOR suggests that the magazine is meant to "fan the flames of Jihad."

== History and examples ==
=== Africa ===
- January 5–6, 2012: Nigeria attacks, around 37 Christians are targeted and killed by Boko Haram militants.
- April 16, 2013: Baga massacre, 187 people are killed in Baga in Borno State. It is unclear whether the Nigerian military or Boko Haram is responsible for the massacre.
- June 18, 2009: Al-Shabaab claimed the 2009 Beledweyne bombing, which killed 35 people including Somali security minister Omar Hashi Aden.

=== Australia ===
- Operation Pendennis: Melbourne & Sydney, Australia November 2005.
- Sydney hostage crisis: December 2014
- Wakeley stabbing - 16 year old male repeatedly stabs Church pastor during sermon livestreaming in Wakeley, NSW April 14, 2024. Teenager has connections to radicalised Muslim religion.

=== Brazil ===
- 1981 Riocentro Bombing: Hardline factions within Brazil's military dictatorship orchestrated a bomb attack at a crowded concert celebrating Labor Day in Rio de Janeiro to derail the country's transition back to democracy.
- 2024 Brasília attack: Francisco Wanderley Luiz, a radicalized former political candidate, detonated explosives outside the Supreme Federal Court (STF) in the Praça dos Três Poderes in Brasília. Prior to the suicide explosion, he also blew up a car packed with fireworks in a nearby parking lot near the Chamber of Deputies, aiming to target Supreme Court justices and disrupt democratic institutions through politically motivated terror.

=== Canada ===
- On October 14, 1982 – The anarchist group the Squamish Five, who were Canadian version of Direct Action, bombed a Litton Industries factory north of Toronto that was manufacturing guidance devices for American cruise missiles, and 10 people were injured.
- On May 8, 1984, soldier Denis Lortie, a federalist, entered the National Assembly with the intent of killing René Lévesque and the deputies of the Parti Québécois. Due to a great amount of chance, he came in too early and did not kill any deputies, but three other people were killed and 13 wounded. An unarmed employee, René Jalbert, negotiated with Lortie for several hours and convinced him to give up his gun and surrender to arrest. Jalbert was decorated the next week.
- On October 20, 2014, in the 2014 Saint-Jean-sur-Richelieu ramming attack, the radicalized Saint-Jean-sur-Richelieu, Quebec, Canadian citizen Martin Couture-Rouleau – who also called himself "Abu Ibrahim AlCanadi" – ran a soldier down and shot another. Couture-Rouleau was, in the aftermath, shot dead by an officer of the Sûreté du Québec.
- On October 22, 2014, Michael Zehaf-Bibeau opened fire at the National War Memorial in Parliament Hill, Ontario. One soldier was shot. The suspect ran to the Parliament of Canada and engaged in a shoot out with security and police forces.
- On January 29, 2017, in the Quebec City mosque shooting, Alexandre Bissonnette, a political science student at the University Laval, opened fire in the Islamic Cultural Centre of Quebec City in Quebec City, Quebec, killing six worshipers.

=== China ===
- 2014 Kunming attack

=== France ===
- Maxime Brunerie's failed assassination attempt of Jacques Chirac
- July 3, 2017, and November 6, 2018, assassination plots against Emmanuel Macron by far-right individuals

=== Germany ===
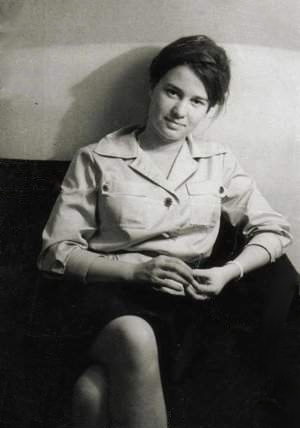
Ulrike Meinhof of the Red Army Faction

- Red Army Faction from 1970 to 1998
- Revolutionary Cells from 1973 to 1993
- National Socialist Underground from 2000 to 2006
- The murder of Walter Lübcke

=== Israel ===
- Brit Hakanaim: Ultra-orthodox radical Jewish organization which operated in the 1950s and worked against the secularization in the newly-born Israel.
- Some Israeli Arabs were involved in terrorists activities numerous times according to the Shin Bet, most of them had connections to Palestinian terrorist organizations, with a minority of them operating by their own. Some notable examples are the bombing of No. 361 Egged bus in Meron, where Israeli Arabs from Bi'ina were involved, and the 2017 Temple Mount shooting.

=== Italy ===
- Years of Lead by far-right neo-Nazi/neo-fascist and far-left Communist/Marxist groups.
- Macerata shooting by neo-Nazi Lega Nord member Luca Traini.

=== Japan ===
- 1974 – 1974 Mitsubishi Heavy Industries bombing
- 1995 – Tokyo subway sarin attack
- 2002–03 attacks by the Volunteer Army Unit for Punishing Traitors
- 2022 – Assassination of Shinzo Abe

=== New Zealand ===
- Wanganui Computer Centre bombing: November 1982, anarchist Neil Roberts detonated a homemade bomb in a suicide attack on the New Zealand Police computer centre. Only Roberts was killed in the attack and while the building entrance doorway was destroyed, the computer system was not damaged.

=== Norway ===
- Norway attacks: July 2011, a right-wing extremist who spoke against Islam and immigration, Anders Behring Breivik was responsible for a car bomb explosion that killed 8 in Oslo and killing 69 at a summer camp on the island of Utøya.

=== Netherlands ===
- Theo van Gogh murder by the Hofstad Group: Amsterdam November 2004

=== Spain ===
- 1959–2018 ETA terrorism.
- 2004 Madrid Train Bombings

=== United Kingdom ===
- London Underground bombing July 2005 in London, United Kingdom
- Murder of Jo Cox in Birstall, West Yorkshire, United Kingdom by Thomas Mair
- 2017 Finsbury Park mosque attack in Finsbury Park, London, United Kingdom by Darren Osbourne
- The neo-Nazi group National Action

=== United States ===
A non-exhaustive list of examples of U.S. attacks that have been referred to as domestic terrorism:

- 1849 San Francisco Coal Miners Massacre- The Hounds, a white vigilante group in San Francisco, attacks a Chilean mining community, raping women, burning houses, and lynching two men.
- 1856 Pottawatomie massacre- Abolitionist John Brown with like-minded settlers killed five pro-slavery settlers north of Pottawatomie Creek in Franklin County, Kansas.
- 1857 Mountain Meadows Massacre- Series of attacks on the Baker–Fancher emigrant wagon train, at Mountain Meadows in southern Utah.
- 1863 Lawrence massacre by Quantrill's Raiders, a Confederate guerrilla group led by William Quantrill, on the Unionist town of Lawrence, Kansas, killing around 190 civilians.
- 1864 St. Albans Raid in Vermont by Confederate agents based in the Province of Canada. They robbed $208,000 from three banks, held hostages, killed a local, and attempted to burn the entire town.
- 1865 Lincoln Assassination
- 1873 Colfax Massacre- Republicans had narrowly won the 1872 election to retain control of the state, but Democrats contested the results. An estimated 62–153 Black militia men were murdered while surrendering to a mob of former Confederate soldiers and members of the Ku Klux Klan.
- 1886 Haymarket affair- Two workers were killed by police in the course of a confrontation between striking workers and strikebreakers in the streets of Chicago.
- 1917 Milwaukee Police Department bombing- Bomb attack that killed ten people including nine members of local law enforcement.
- 1920 Wall Street bombing- Horse-drawn wagon filled with 100 pounds (45 kg) of dynamite was detonated and killed 38 and injured 400 across the street from the headquarters of the J.P. Morgan Bank in the Financial District of New York City.
- 1921 Tulsa race massacre- A white mob started the Tulsa race massacre attacking residents and businesses of the African-American community known as Black Wall Street, in the Greenwood area in Tulsa, Oklahoma, in what is considered one of the worst incidents of racial violence in United States History.
- 1963 16th Street Baptist Church bombing- Members of the United Klans of America set a bomb consisting of a timing device and fifteen sticks of dynamite to explode at a historically black church in Birmingham, Alabama, that was a local focus of the Civil Rights struggle.
- 1969–1975 Attacks by The Weather Underground.
- 1973–1975 SLA activities and the 1974 shootout by Donald DeFreeze
- 1979, members of the KKK and the American Nazi Party shot five members of the Communist Workers Party at the Greensboro massacre.
- 1980–1985 Attacks by the Jewish Defense League.
- 1981 Muñiz Air National Guard Base attack by the Boricua Popular Army
- 1983–1984 The Order/Bruder Schweigen activities such as the assassination of Jewish radio host Alan Berg in Denver, Colorado.
- 1994–1996 Aryan Republican Army criminal activities.
- 1995 Oklahoma City bombing at Alfred P. Murrah Federal Building in Oklahoma City, Oklahoma, by Timothy McVeigh
- 1996 Centennial Olympic Park bombing at Centennial Olympic Park, Atlanta, Georgia, by Eric Robert Rudolph
- 1999 Los Angeles Jewish Community Center shooting at Granada Hills North Valley Jewish Community Center and Chatsworth in Los Angeles, by Buford O. Furrow
- 1999 The murders of Gary Matson and Winfield Mowder and burnings of Sacramento synagogues and abortion clinics in Happy Valley, California, and Sacramento, California, by Matthew and Tyler Williams
- 2002 Beltway sniper attacks in and around Washington, D.C., area by John Allen Muhammad and Lee Boyd Malvo
- 2008 Barack Obama assassination plot in Tennessee by neo-Nazi skinheads
- 2008 Knoxville Unitarian Universalist church shooting at the Tennessee Valley Unitarian Universalist Church in Knoxville, Tennessee, by Jim David Adkinsson
- 2009 United States Holocaust Memorial Museum shooting at the United States Holocaust Memorial Museum in Washington, D.C., by James von Brunn
- 2009 Fort Hood shooting at Fort Hood in Killeen, Texas, by Nidal Hasan
- 2010 Austin suicide attack targeting the IRS at Building I Echelon office complex in Austin, Texas, by Andrew Joseph Stack III
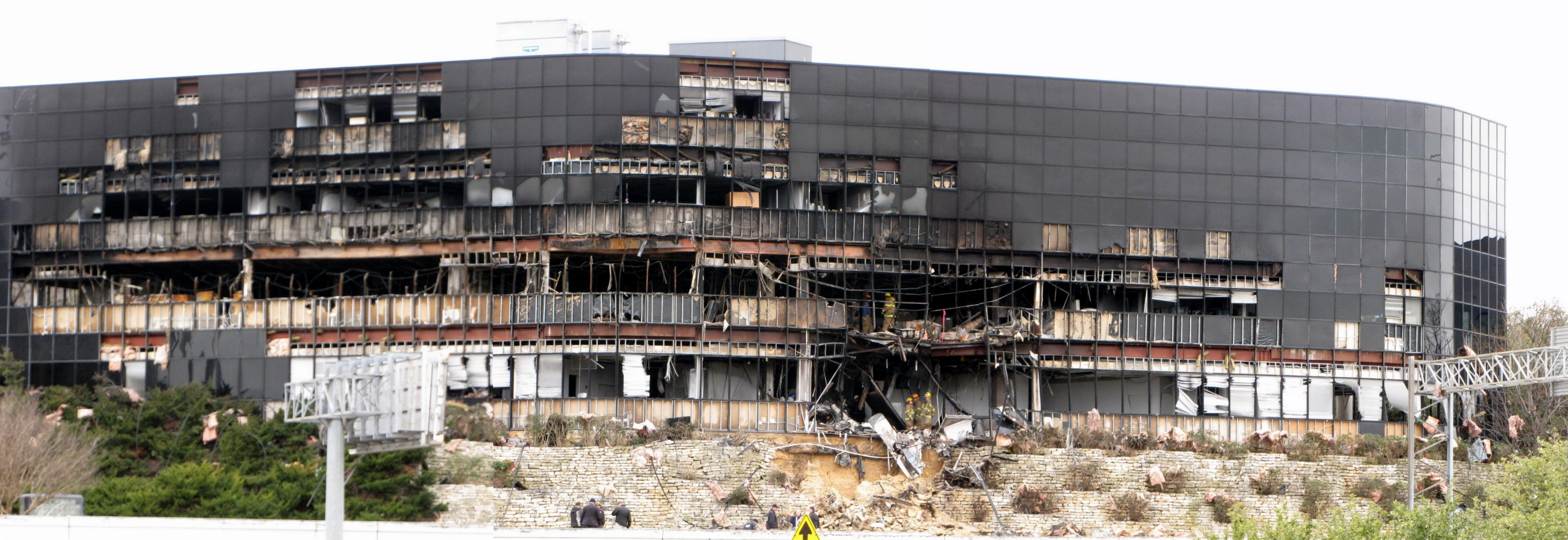
  Damage to building after 2010 Austin suicide attack
- 2012 Wisconsin Sikh temple shooting Wade Michael Page fatally shot six people (including himself) and wounded four others in a mass shooting at a Sikh temple in Oak Creek, Wisconsin.
- 2013 Boston Marathon bombing at Boylston Street and Boston Marathon in Boston by Dzhkohar Tsarnaev and Tamerlan Tsarnaev.
- 2014 Overland Park Jewish Community Center shooting at the Jewish Community Center of Greater Kansas City and Village Shalom by Frazier Glenn Miller Jr.
- 2015 Curtis Culwell Center attack terrorist attack on an exhibit featuring cartoon images of Muhammad at the Curtis Culwell Center in Garland, Texas.
- 2015 Charleston church shooting at Emanuel African Methodist Episcopal Church in Charleston, South Carolina, by Dylann Roof
- 2015 Lafayette shooting at Grand 16 movie theatre in Lafayette, Louisiana, by John "Rusty" Russell Houser.
- 2015 Colorado Springs Planned Parenthood shooting at a Planned Parenthood clinic in Colorado Springs, Colorado, by Robert Lewis Dear
- 2015 San Bernardino attack at the Inland Regional Center in San Bernardino, California, by Rizwan Farook and Tashfeen Malik
- 2015 Chattanooga shootings at the Armed Forces Career Center and U.S. Navy Reserve center in Chattanooga, Tennessee, by Muhammad Youssef Abdulazeez
- 2016 Orlando nightclub shooting at Pulse LGBT nightclub in Orlando, Florida, by Omar Mateen
- 2016 2016 shooting of Dallas police officers On July 7, 2016, Micah Xavier Johnson ambushed and shot police officers in Dallas, Texas, killing five, injuring nine others, and wounding two civilians. Johnson, a 25-year-old Army Reserve Afghan War veteran, was enraged over white police shootings of black men. The shooting was the deadliest incident for U.S. law enforcement since the September 11 attacks.
- 2017 murder of Timothy Caughman at Hell's Kitchen in Manhattan by James Harris Jackson
- 2017 murder of Richard Collins III at the University of Maryland in College Park, Maryland, by Sean Urbanski
- 2017 Congressional baseball shooting at the Congressional Baseball Game for Charity in Alexandria, Virginia, by James Thomas Hodgkinson
- 2017 Fresno shootings at Motel 6 and downtown Fresno in Fresno, California, by Kori Ali Muhammad
- 2017 Charlottesville car attack during the Charlottesville riots/Unite the Right rally at Downtown Mall in Charlottesville, Virginia, by James Alex Fields
- 2017 Burnette Chapel shooting at the Burnette Chapel Church of Christ in Antioch, Tennessee, by Emanuel Kidega Samson.
- 2018 October 2018 United States mail bombing attempts across various cities in the United States by Cesar Alteri Sayoc Jr.
- 2018 murder of Blaze Bernstein at Borrego Park in Lake Forest, California, by Samuel Woodard/Atomwaffen Division
- 2018 Pittsburgh synagogue shooting at Tree of Life - Or L'Simcha Congregation by Robert Bowers
- 2019 Christopher Paul Hasson's assassination plot of Democratic, left-wing, and socialist politicians and journalists
- 2019 Escondido mosque fire and Poway synagogue shooting at Dar-ul-Arqam mosque and Chabad of Poway in Escondido, California, and Poway, California, by John T. Earnest
- 2019 Tacoma attack at an ICE detention center in Tacoma, Washington, by Willem van Spronsen
- 2019 El Paso shooting at a Walmart store in El Paso, Texas, by Patrick Crusius
- 2020 Gretchen Whitmer kidnapping plot planned by far-right militia group Wolverine Watchmen
- 2020 Killings of Aaron Danielson and Michael Reinoehl by Michael Reinoehl
- 2020 Nashville bombing by conspiracist Anthony Warner detonating his RV in downtown Nashville on Christmas Day.
- 2022 Colleyville synagogue hostage crisis in Texas
- 2022 Buffalo shooting in New York
- 2023 Jacksonville shooting in Florida

== See also ==
- Domestic terrorism in the United States
- Jihadist extremism in the United States
- Domestic terrorism in Canada
- Domestic violence
- Psychological warfare
- Political warfare
- Religious terrorism
- Violent extremism
- Mass shooting
