= 2014 shootings at Parliament Hill =

Terrorist attacks in Ottawa, Canada

Shootings at War Memorial and Parliament Hill
- Location: 45.42402629445419°N 75.69549470591251°W; National War Memorial (Canada) - Centre Block Ottawa, Ontario, Canada
- Date: 22 October 2014; 12 years ago 9:53 a.m. – 9:55 a.m. (EDT)
- Attack type: Mass shooting, domestic terrorism
- Weapon: .30-30 Winchester Model 94 rifle
- Deaths: 2 (including the perpetrator)
- Injuries: 3
- Victim: Nathan Cirillo
- Perpetrator: Michael Zehaf-Bibeau
- Defenders: Kevin Vickers; Curtis Barrett
- Motive: Islamic extremism

The 2014 shootings at Parliament Hill occurred on 22 October 2014, at Parliament Hill in Ottawa. Corporal Nathan Cirillo, a Canadian soldier, and reservist on ceremonial sentry duty, was fatally shot at the National War Memorial, followed by an attack on the nearby Centre Block parliament building, where members of the Parliament of Canada were attending caucuses. The attack ended with a shootout when the perpetrator, 32-year-old Islamic terrorist Michael Zehaf-Bibeau, ran inside the parliament buildings and was shot by Royal Canadian Mounted Police (RCMP) officers and died on scene. Following the shootings, the downtown core of Ottawa was placed on lockdown and majority of schools in Ottawa were on lockdown while police searched for any potential additional threats.

Classified by the RCMP as a terrorist act, it was the most serious security breach at Parliament Hill since the 1966 parliament bombing. The attack gained international attention and raised concerns about the effectiveness of police actions to prevent terrorist attacks, and the security measures in place at federal and provincial legislatures.

== Shootings ==
=== National War Memorial ===
Shortly before 10:00 a.m. EDT, on 22 October 2014, witnesses saw a man arrive at the National War Memorial carrying a rifle, dressed in blue jeans and a black jacket, with a keffiyeh scarf over the lower part of his face. The attacker approached Corporal Nathan Cirillo of The Argyll and Sutherland Highlanders of Canada (Princess Louise's), a reserve infantry unit, who was one of three sentries from the Ceremonial Guard posted at the Tomb of the Unknown Soldier. At close range, Cirillo was shot twice in the back, fatally wounding him. One account stated that after Cirillo was hit once in the back from a distance of 3 metres from the memorial, he tried to take cover and crawl to the other side of the tomb but the gunman pursued him and shot him again in the lower back from behind. Cirillo, like all others who stood sentry at the memorial, carried an unloaded firearm, provided by the CAF with no particular training for such a situation. It was only minutes before the end of the sentries' shift, which ended at 10:00 a.m. Cpl. Kyle Button and Cpl. Branden Stevenson, two other soldiers on sentry duty, attempted to stop the attack, but they were shot at and forced to flee to the other side of the Memorial.

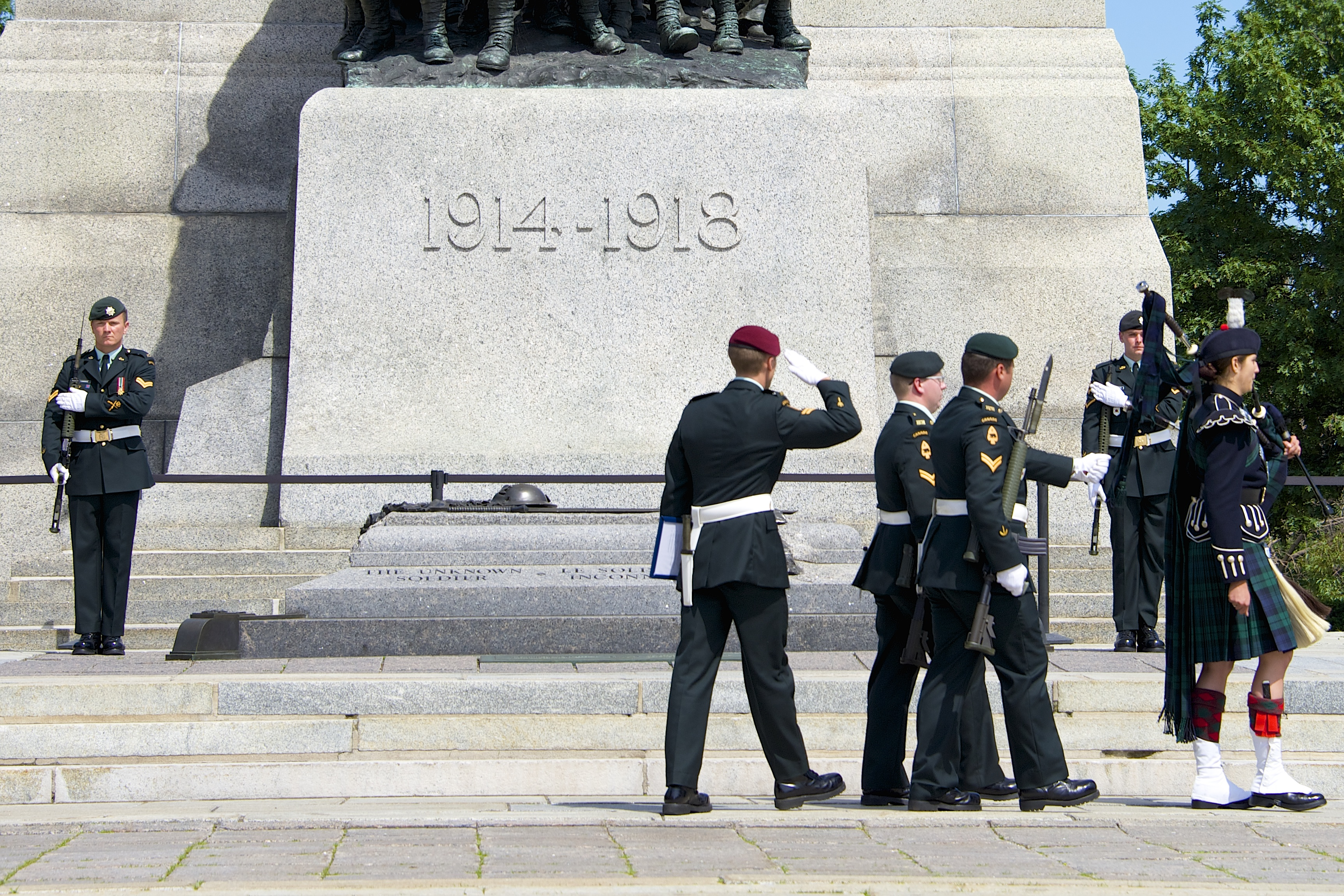
Nathan Cirillo was on sentry duty at the National War Memorial, similar to the sentries in this picture, when he was fatally shot.

The attacker pulled down his scarf, held his rifle one-handedly over his head and yelled, "For Iraq." before fleeing the scene. The three soldiers then attended to Cirillo. Along with bystanders, they applied first aid to Cirillo, attempting to resuscitate him; Paramedic Chief Anthony DiMonte, who was first on scene, assumed patient care until additional paramedics arrived to provide medical care before Cirillo was taken to hospital.

Cpl. Anthony Wiseman was nearly run over while attempting to stop the attacker who returned to his vehicle, a small grey Toyota car, which was parked on the south side of Wellington Street behind the memorial. He drove west along Wellington a short distance to Parliament Hill where he abandoned his vehicle. Past scattering bystanders, he ran through a gate in the fence surrounding the Parliament Hill precinct and carjacked a parliamentary vehicle assigned to ministers of the Crown, which he drove to the Centre Block parliament building. RCMP officers on patrol in the precinct witnessed the carjacking and pursued the vehicle to the base of the Peace Tower.

A photograph of the attack was taken by a tourist at the war memorial during the shootings. It shows the attacker holding the rifle and wearing a scarf over part of his face, with part of the War Memorial behind him. Ottawa police seized the camera and then took their own photograph of the image using a cellphone. French-Canadian journalist William Reymond received a copy of the photograph via the Internet, anonymously, apparently a copy of a tweet originating from the Ottawa Police of the cellphone picture. Reymond then took a picture of the image as it was displayed on his computer monitor and posted it to Twitter a few hours later after confirming the image. The image was re-tweeted by an ISIL sympathizer, leading to erroneous media reports that the image originated from an ISIL Twitter account.

=== Parliament buildings ===
Parliament Hill's Centre Block, scene of the attack

The attacker, Michael Zehaf-Bibeau, entered the Centre Block through the main entrance under the Peace Tower, where Samearn Son was one of two constables on duty. Son saw the rifle in Zehaf-Bibeau's hand, immediately grabbed it, and pulled it towards the floor while yelling, "Gun! Gun! Gun!" In the ensuing struggle, Son was shot in the foot and had to let go of the attacker. While other RCMP officers converged, Son limped out of the building and calmly told a CBC reporter outside, "I will survive." Just inside the Centre Block, gunfire was exchanged with security personnel and the attacker was wounded.

Zehaf-Bibeau then ran along the Hall of Honour corridor toward the Library of Parliament. Pursued by RCMP officers, he passed, on his left, the door to a committee room in which Canadian Prime Minister Stephen Harper and the governing Conservative Members of Parliament (MPs) were meeting. Directly opposite was the door to another caucus room, where leader of the opposition, Thomas Mulcair, and New Democratic Party MPs were gathered. (The Liberals, as the third party, were holding their caucus meeting in a chamber downstairs.) During the shooting, one bullet penetrated the outer doors to the NDP caucus room. Inside their room, NDP MPs dove for cover. Across the hall, the RCMP placed Prime Minister Harper in a closet while Conservative MPs made a barricade at the doors, grabbing flagpoles to use as rudimentary spears.

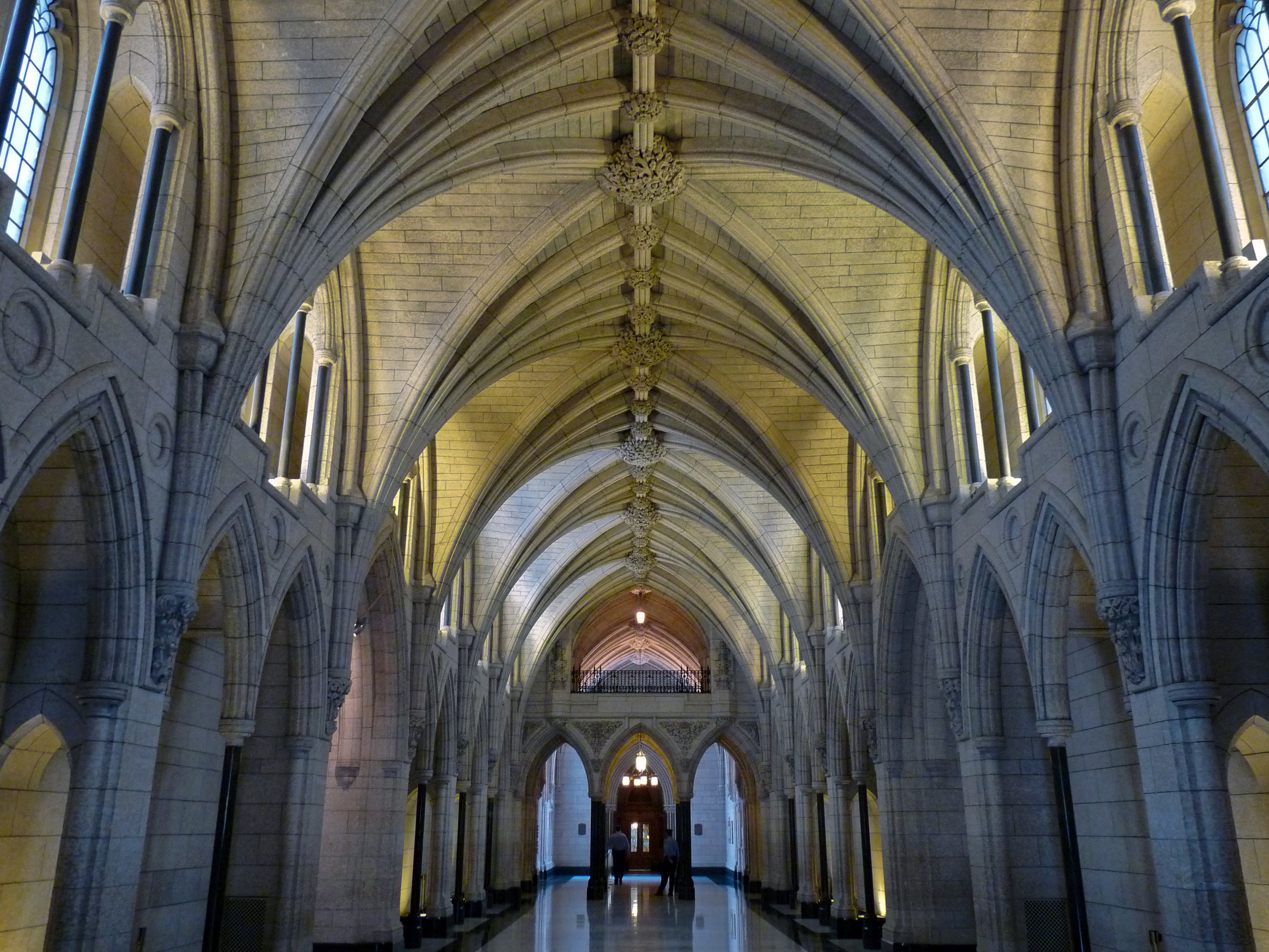
The Hall of Honour in the Centre Block, where the attacker was killed in an exchange of gunfire

Finally, the attacker reached an alcove by the entrance to the Library of Parliament, and hid out of sight of RCMP officers, who ordered him to drop his gun and surrender. The location of the alcove is near the office of the Sergeant-at-Arms of the House of Commons, Kevin Vickers. Vickers, a distinguished policeman, commander and administrator with the RCMP before he joined the staff of the House of Commons in 2005, retrieved his 9mm Smith & Wesson 5946 handgun from a lock-box and entered the hall.

Vickers's security team, which had been chasing, yelled to Vickers that the suspect was hiding in the alcove. Vickers immediately ran behind the other side of a nearby column, then dove past the column and fired upward at the attacker.

Witnesses and reports show RCMP Constable Curtis Barrett, leading the tactical formation, fired the shot that killed the attacker after they had fired in his direction. CBC television cameras on the scene recorded over 30 shots fired in the final gunfight. Footage showed a group of RCMP officers converging near the alcove; two loud gunshots are heard, then a large number of gunshots in rapid succession, then silence.

Vickers was recorded by CBC video footage walking away from the shooting site, going to the Conservative caucus room. Vickers explained to the Conservative caucus what had happened and reportedly said either "I put him down" or "I have engaged the suspect. He is deceased." According to Vickers's niece: "This is the first time in his career that he's shot anyone." Following the shooting, Harper's RCMP security detail arrived and evacuated him, while the Parliament buildings were put into lockdown.

== Casualty and injuries ==
Corporal Nathan Cirillo
- Born: Nathan Frank Cirillo; 23 December 1989; Hamilton, Ontario
- Died: 22 October 2014 (aged 24); National War Memorial
- Burial place: Woodland Cemetery, Hamilton, Ontario; Section 18, Row 19, Grave: 30
- Children: Marcus Cirillo (5 y.o. at death)
- Military career
- Branch: Canadian Army
- Service years: 8 years
- Rank: Corporal
- Unit: The Argyll and Sutherland Highlanders of Canada (Princess Louise's)
- Conflicts: War in Afghanistan

Corporal Nathan Frank Cirillo (23 December 1989 – 22 October 2014), a 24-year-old Canadian soldier, was killed. He was a Class-A reservist of The Argyll and Sutherland Highlanders of Canada from Hamilton, Ontario. He was on sentry duty, as a chosen member of the Ceremonial Guard, at the Tomb of the Unknown Soldier at the National War Memorial when he was shot. Cirillo had a standard issue Colt Canada C7 rifle which, in accordance with standard practice, was unloaded. Although several civilians immediately provided assistance for the wounded reservist, Cirillo died in hospital later that morning. Cirillo's funeral took place a few days later. The procession of an estimated 4,500 military members — as well as police and emergency service members — made its way from Bayfront Park to Christ's Church Cathedral on James Street North. Thousands of onlookers silently paid their respects all along the route. Members of the regiment, Cirillo's mother Kathy, and Cirillo's five-year-old son followed wearing his father's style regiment's cap observed as his flag-draped casket was carried inside. Corporal Cirillo's remains are buried in the very middle of the military section of Woodland Cemetery in Burlington, Ontario.

Samearn Son, a House of Commons constable, was shot in the foot while trying to wrestle a gun away from the perpetrator at the Centre Block, and was treated and released by Ottawa Civic Hospital. Son's actions caused a critical delay, allowing other security personnel to mobilize before the attack. Two other unidentified people who were injured in unspecified locations were treated and released at Ottawa Civic Hospital.

== Aftermath ==
=== Ottawa ===
Ottawa's downtown core was put under lockdown while a search began for a potential second shooter. Buildings under lockdown included the Parliament buildings, the University of Ottawa and the United States embassy. Initially, police reported a third shooting had taken place near the Rideau Centre mall at the same time. A few hours later, police corrected this mistaken report, stating that only two shootings took place.

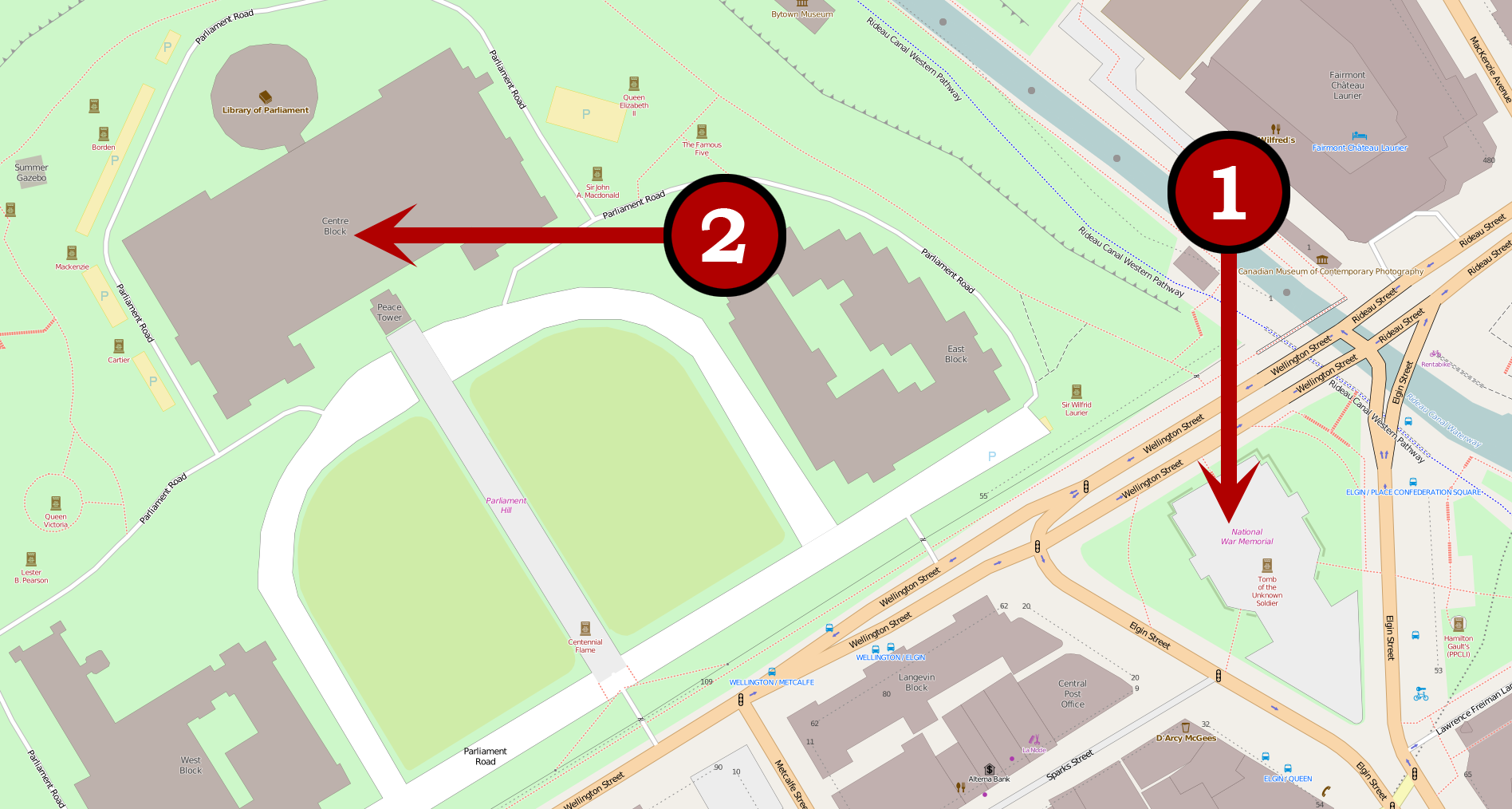
The locations of the two shooting incidents: 1. the war memorial, 2. the Centre Block

At a press conference at 14:00, Ottawa police confirmed Cirillo's death without using his name, pending notification of his family. The RCMP confirmed the suspect's death, without his name or any other details, citing the ongoing investigation. The National Defence headquarters, the parliament buildings and other government facilities remained in lockdown while a search of the area took place. Areas around Parliament Hill including the Rideau Centre and the University of Ottawa remained closed for hours with buildings in lockdown, with police searching buildings room by room for shooters. Police lifted the lockdown on all public schools in and around Ottawa's downtown core at around 5:45 p.m. Parliament Hill remained under lockdown until well past 21:00 and, even after MPs and staffers were allowed to leave the Centre Block, streets directly adjacent to Parliament Hill and the National War Memorial remained closed to the public the next day. Parliament Hill reopened to the public on 24 October, and Parliament Buildings tours resumed on 27 October.

=== Nationally and internationally ===
Canadian Armed Forces members in Ottawa, Quebec and Atlantic Canada were told to stay out of uniform when not on active duty, while members in other parts of Canada were not asked to avoid wearing uniforms. Further, Canadian military bases around the country heightened their security. The incident caused cancellation of a ceremony scheduled for later the same day in Toronto, in which Nobel Peace Prize recipient Malala Yousafzai was to receive her certificate of honorary Canadian citizenship from Stephen Harper.

Although security was heightened at the Legislative Assembly of Ontario in Toronto, all of the party leaders agreed that the day's session of Question Period should continue. In Edmonton, public tours were cancelled for the day at the Legislative Assembly of Alberta and security increased. The Legislative Assembly of British Columbia was placed under restricted access and most constituency offices on Vancouver Island were closed as a precaution. Nova Scotia's legislature, sitting that day, restricted access in the public gallery to the press and staff of the government and political parties. All provincial and territorial assemblies flew flags at half mast the evening of 22 October as a tribute to Cirillo.

In the United States, security was increased in Washington, D.C.: at the Canadian embassy, United States federal government offices nearby, and the Tomb of the Unknowns at Arlington National Cemetery. The Australian Federal Police increased security at Australia's Parliament House, as well as at the Canadian High Commission in Canberra. Security at the New Zealand Parliament Buildings was also tightened.

== Reactions ==
On 23 October, MPs in the House of Commons gave a standing ovation to Vickers for his heroism. As Mulcair of the New Democratic Party put it: "Just as we have all borne witness to these horrific acts, we have watched in awe your acts of courage, now an abiding emblem of Canadian strength, values and valour." The first order of business was a moment of silence for Cirillo. Prior to the day's session, Harper laid a wreath at the War Memorial; MPs from all parties attended a moment of silence and sang "O Canada" at the Memorial before walking together to Parliament. The flags at Parliament Hill and other federal government buildings were also flown at half-mast.

A National Hockey League (NHL) game to have taken place on 22 October in Ottawa, between the Ottawa Senators and Toronto Maple Leafs, was postponed and rescheduled for 9 November. Over the following days, several NHL teams held moments of silence and "O Canada" was sung prior to games in the United States in which no Canadian team was participating. On 25 October, pre-game ceremonies were jointly held in Ottawa, Montreal, and Toronto to honour the deceased and first responders. On the same day of the attack, before an NHL game between the Pittsburgh Penguins and the Philadelphia Flyers, the Canadian National Anthem was sung in honour of the attack. The largest Canadian flag was used for a pre-game ceremony between the Ottawa Redblacks and the Montreal Alouettes of the CFL.

A fund to benefit the families of Cirillo and Vincent was started on 22 October with a goal of CDN$10,000. It surpassed its goal by noon the following day, when representatives of Canadian banks called to arrange a donation of $80,000. By 29 October, the fund, known as the Stand On Guard Fund, had raised $550,000. The fund raised $705,000 of a newly-set $750,000 goal by the time the fund-raising deadline was reached.

A mosque in Cold Lake, Alberta, was defaced overnight with graffiti. This was immediately cleaned up in a joint effort with local residents. An Ottawa mosque was the scene of two incidents: A member praised the attacker as a martyr after prayers, leading to the police stopping him for national security reasons the next day. A vandal then destroyed several windows, causing over $10,000 in damages.

As soon as the war memorial was reopened to the public, a makeshift memorial to Cirillo grew in front of it; residents laid out flowers, cards, and wreaths. On 24 October 2014, Cirillo's body was transported home to Hamilton in an official motorcade along Ontario Highway 401, the portion of which between Trenton and Toronto is known as the Highway of Heroes. The times of the motorcade were publicized and people stood at overpasses to observe and as it passed. Cirillo's family released a statement and gave thanks to the Canadian Forces for the support offered and to those who came to the soldier's aid. Thousands attended visitation at the funeral home where Cirillo lay in repose. He was accorded the honour of a full regimental funeral service and funeral procession on 28 October in Hamilton, attended by family, soldiers, and dignitaries.

On 27 October, a concert by the National Arts Centre Orchestra (NAC Orchestra) (from Ottawa) and Royal Philharmonic Orchestra (from London) concert was dedicated to Patrice Vincent and Nathan Cirillo and was attended by Prince Charles. The NAC Orchestra dedicated its entire UK tour of five performances to Vincent and Cirillo.

On 11 November, the annual Remembrance Day service at the war memorial was held as planned. It was attended by Anne, Princess Royal, along with the Governor General, the Prime Minister, and other dignitaries. It was attended by a larger than normal crowd of 50,000. This was attributed to "a rising tide of concern for Canada's Forces" since the attacks. There was an increased police presence at the event because of the two killings and military armored vehicles patrolled the area, while military personnel were deployed on nearby rooftops. Persons have continued to leave "bouquets, poppies, photos, poems, written tributes, stuffed animals, a can or two of beer, even a battered hockey stick" at the war memorial, although the government has removed the items several times.

=== Statements on the shootings ===
==== Canadian ====
Immediate reactions came from MPs John McKay: "There was a pop, pop, pop sound so the guards ushered us to the back of the building" and David McGuinty: describing there is a "palpable sense of fear" in Ottawa and "it's extremely unusual for such an atmosphere to exist in the city". Ottawa Mayor Jim Watson said it was a "sad and tragic day for the city and country." Other Canadian politicians and social media also reacted.

Elizabeth II, the Queen of Canada, issued a statement from her and Prince Philip, Duke of Edinburgh, expressing shock and sadness. Her federal representative, Governor General David Johnston, extended his sympathies to the family of the deceased Canadian soldier and gratitude for the "professionalism and courage of our security personnel and emergency responders."

In a televised address that evening, Harper called the shootings a "brutal and violent attack" and made specific reference to the ISIL-inspired attack on Canadian soldiers two days earlier. Harper insisted that "Canada will not be intimidated" by acts of violence and remained committed to Canada's efforts "to work with our allies around the world and fight against the terrorist organizations who brutalize those in other countries with the hope of bringing their savagery to our shores. They will have no safe haven." Harper classified both of the week's attacks as terrorism in his address to the House of Commons on 23 October, saying "we're all aware and deeply troubled that both of this week's terrorist attacks were carried out by Canadian citizens, by young men born and raised in this peaceful country."

Tom Mulcair, the Leader of the Official Opposition, called the shooting a "cowardly act designed to strike at the heart of our democracy" that was "designed to drive [Canadians] to hate." Mulcair categorized the attacker as a criminal, not a terrorist: "I don't think we have enough evidence to use that word."

Justin Trudeau, the leader of the Liberal Party of Canada, said "Canadians know acts such as these committed in the name of Islam are an aberration of [the Muslim] faith. Mutual respect and admiration will help to prevent the influence of distorted ideological propaganda posing as religion." He agreed with the RCMP that this was a terrorist attack.

Green Party leader Elizabeth May said in the House of Commons: "I would put money on these being the acts of isolated, disturbed and deeply troubled men who were drawn to something crazy. I do not believe that it was a vast network, or that the country is more at risk today than it was last week. However, that is my opinion. I can be wrong...I am undoubtedly going to be wrong again, but what I would like to suggest is that we wait for answers from the police before we make assumptions, and that we speak calmly, truthfully and openly to all Canadians."

Premier of Ontario Kathleen Wynne said, "Our belief is that people who are using violence to undermine democracy want us to be silenced and we refuse to be silenced."

A public statement by the Muslim Association of Canada condemned the violence in Ottawa and Quebec: "MAC would like to offer its condolences to the victims of violence over the past week. We are horrified by these acts of violence, especially in the Parliament of our nation's capital. We stand with all Canadians in condemning these attacks and seeking justice for those responsible." The National Council of Canadian Muslims also said it: "stands united with Canadians in categorically condemning today's shooting attacks."

A national poll by the Angus Reid organization released on November 25, 2014, revealed that Canadians in general were also split as well on whether the attack and shooting was an act of terrorism or mental illness. 38% felt that it was the result of mental illness, while 36% felt it was terrorism, with 25% undecided. Asked about what the federal government should do as a result, 54% felt that more initiatives should be done to prevent radicalization, while 34% favoured harsher punishments. On how to deal with homegrown terrorists, 54% felt that indefinite incarceration only motivated persons to commit crimes, while 46% felt it prevented violent crime.

==== American ====
President Barack Obama was briefed about the attacks. The White House released a statement that read: "President Obama condemned these outrageous attacks, and reaffirmed the close friendship and alliance between our people." In the following week, U.S. Secretary of State John Kerry made a visit to Ottawa, which included laying a wreath at the National War Memorial in honour of the soldier killed.

Journalist Glenn Greenwald said that the Canadian government was exploiting the shootings by wasting "no time in seizing on the incident to promote its fear-mongering agenda over terrorism, which includes pending legislation to vest its intelligence agency, CSIS, with more spying and secrecy powers in the name of fighting ISIS." He also said that the shootings weren't an act of terrorism, writing that, "... to the extent the term [terrorism] has any common understanding, it includes the deliberate (or wholly reckless) targeting of civilians with violence for political ends. But in this case in Canada, it wasn't civilians who were targeted. If one believes the government's accounts of the incident, the driver waited two hours until he saw a soldier in uniform. In other words, he seems to have deliberately avoided attacking civilians, and targeted a soldier instead – a member of a military that is currently fighting a war." Greenwald's opinion was in turn criticized by academic Daniel W. Drezner who said that his argument was both banal and incomplete, and that the reason why there was shock in Canada at the attack was that democracies at least claimed to adhere to jus in bello when they prosecuted violent conflicts, whereas some of their opponents did not.

==== British ====
Prime Minister David Cameron said he was "appalled by [the] attack in Ottawa" and offered his full support to his Canadian and Commonwealth counterpart, Stephen Harper, and the Canadian people as they dealt with the incident.

An editorial in The Guardian on 26 October said "it is hard to judge the exact significance of this week's events" and "[Canada's] diversity is reflected in an acute sensitivity to the risks of conflating the threat of terror with Islam itself, which represents the country's second largest faith community." The editorial ended with:

And only a fortnight ago, its parliament voted to join the coalition in support of the US bombing of Isis targets: the country's security agencies were clear that they believed the decision would heighten the risk of a terrorist attack. Lawmakers were drafting legislation to combat radical violence before this latest attack. Politicians should now pause before succumbing to the temptation to rush through laws that further restrict civil liberties in the name of national security. It would be a betrayal of all that Canada represents if it allowed exceptional, and horrific, events to remould that society.

An editorial in The Economist from 8 November 2014, in discussing the impact on US-Canada border security, said:

The attack in Ottawa last month by a lone gunman, who killed a Canadian soldier and stormed parliament, seems likely to make matters worse. Although there is still uncertainty about the motives of the gunman, Michael Zehaf-Bibeau—possibly a deranged outcast, possibly a religious extremist—the United States is reviewing security along the 5,525-mile (8,890km) line which separates the two countries (including the Alaskan land border).

==== Supranational ====
- United Nations: The United Nations issued a statement that Secretary-General Ban Ki-moon was "aware of the situation...[and] he hopes the situation will be brought quickly under control by Canadian law enforcement authorities. His thoughts are with the people and government of Canada at this difficult time."
- NATO: Secretary General Jens Stoltenberg issued a press release expressing his shock and sadness at the shootings and condolences for the family of the victim.
- NORAD: Commander General Charles H. Jacoby issued a statement that offered condolences: "My heart goes out to our Canadian comrades on this tragic day following the shootings in Ottawa, as well as the hit-and-run attack in Quebec earlier this week, both of which targeted Canadian Armed Forces personnel. We offer our sincerest condolences to the people of Canada. We share their grief, but also their determination not to be intimidated by these cowardly acts."

==== Other sovereign states ====
- Australia: Both Tony Abbott, the Prime Minister, and Mark Binskin, the Chief of the Defence Force, issued statements of condolence and solidarity with Canada.
- France: President François Hollande, who made a state visit to Canada, said: "I want to express all of France's solidarity with the families of the victims tragically murdered in those terrorist attacks that caused such grief to your country."
- Georgia: The Ministry of Foreign Affairs released a statement expressing "its deep concern over the attack" and stating "its solidarity with the Canadian Government and the Canadian people."
- India: Prime Minister Narendra Modi condemned the attack, saying, "As a nation that has experienced a horrific terrorist attack on its Parliament, we share the sense of outrage and trauma of the people of Canada over the attack on the highest institution of democracy. Canada is one of India's strongest partners and we will continue to strengthen our cooperation in combating terrorism and other crimes for a safer future for our people."
- Israel: Prime Minister Benjamin Netanyahu offered condolences and support.
- Malaysia: Ronald Kiandee, the Deputy Speaker of the lower house of the Malaysian parliament, condemned the attack, saying such incidents to Canada's parliament "should never have happened".
- New Zealand: Prime Minister John Key offered condolences and solidarity.
- Singapore: A Ministry of Foreign Affairs spokesperson condemned the attack and said: "The attacks underscore the need for countries to remain vigilant in dealing with the threat posed by terrorists."

== Investigation and government response ==
Initially, the Ottawa Police Service (OPS) said they were investigating the shooting at the war memorial, while the RCMP was investigating the shooting at Centre Block. However, on 23 October, the OPS announced that the shooting had been declared a matter of national security and, as such, the entire investigation would be turned over to the RCMP. It was also announced that the RCMP had in turn asked the Ontario Provincial Police (OPP) to conduct a standard independent investigation into the response of police and security forces.

Recalled were reports issued by the Auditor General of Canada on the security of the House of Commons and the Senate. While many operational aspects were praised, it was noted that possible jurisdictional confusion could result between the RCMP, Ottawa Police, the House of Commons Security Services, and the Senate Protective Service and that no agency had jurisdiction over the roofs of the parliament buildings. The day after the shooting, Prime Minister Harper pledged to expedite plans to boost security forces' surveillance, detention, and arrest powers; other members of the government indicated consideration was being made toward ways to magnify anti-terrorism laws.

Michael Zehaf-Bibeau was identified by officials as the perpetrator of the shootings. Initial reports put out by Reuters and US-based networks in the first few hours after the shooting said the shooter was born 'Michael Joseph Hall' and changed his name after converting to Islam, but these proved unreliable and were contradicted the next day by Reuters, and the major Canadian news sources in in-depth reporting.

The RCMP on 23 October released security video showing Zehaf-Bibeau's movements across the Parliament Hill precinct. They also announced that Zehaf-Bibeau was not one of 93 suspected extremists on a RCMP high-risk traveller list, though email written by Zehaf-Bibeau had been found on a computer belonging to an unnamed individual charged with terrorism offences. At this meeting, RCMP Commissioner Paulson said Zehaf-Bibeau's mother had told the RCMP that he wanted to go to Syria, but she denied this, stating that, in a recorded interview, she had told the RCMP that he had wanted to go to Saudi Arabia.

It was announced by the RCMP on 26 October that they had "persuasive evidence" showing Zehaf-Bibeau's attack had been "driven by ideological and political motives." According to the RCMP, Zehaf-Bibeau had recorded a video of himself prior to the attack in which, Commissioner Paulson alleged that "[Zehaf-Bibeau] was quite deliberate, he was quite lucid and he was quite purposeful in articulating the basis for his actions. They were in respect, broadly, to Canada's foreign policy and in respect of his religious beliefs." The RCMP did not release the video, which they said they were studying for "its intelligence and evidence value", but Paulson said they hoped to release it eventually.

Paulson appeared before a parliamentary committee on 27 October to brief MPs. "While we are facing this threat at home, we must focus our efforts on preventing individuals traveling abroad to commit acts of terrorism. Preventing the individuals from traveling is critical. If these individuals return with training and/or battle experience, they pose an even greater threat to Canada and our allies."

That day, the government, after delay caused by the shootings, introduced a bill to broaden the powers of the Canadian Security Intelligence Service (CSIS). Among other powers, it would allow the agency to operate internationally and introduce a program to revoke Canadian citizenship of dual nationals who are convicted of terrorism. The Canadian Civil Liberties Association urged the government to not over-react: "before we take steps to expand existing police and intelligence power, we need answers about why the power that we have were not used, or were insufficient, to prevent or avoid recent tragedies." On 29 October, Minister of Justice Peter MacKay said the government would work to prevent the promotion of terrorism online.

The media reported on 13 November that security video taken at the Centre Block parliament building showed that Zehaf-Bibeau had taken a tour of the building three weeks before the attack. The security video was not released to the public. A large knife was found next to Zehaf-Bibeau's body after he was killed, and it was reported that the RCMP's working theory of his actions was that he intended to behead someone.

On 23 November, the government announced that they would unify the various security forces of the House of Commons and the Senate under one command. The existence of the two separate forces had been identified as a point of failure in the 22 October incident. Other areas suggested to be addressed was the need for better surveillance equipment including a central surveillance officer, and a lack of networking between the forces, including the RCMP.

On 1 December, RCMP Commissioner Paulson said the RCMP would not release the video of Zehaf-Bibeau's alleged motives. Members of Parliament had called for its release, stating that he should not comment on it without releasing it for public discussion. Paulson said releasing a partial transcript was possible. The same day, CBC News reported that Centre Block security video showed that Zehaf-Bibeau had been shot once in an exchange of gunfire with Commons security before running along the Hall of Honour towards the Library of Parliament. On 3 December, the Toronto Star, National Post and Winnipeg Free Press major newspapers called for the videos to be released.

On 17 December, Prime Minister Harper suggested that the attacker may not have been acting alone, but did not elaborate. In an interview on national television, Harper would not confirm he was hidden in a closet during the shootings, but said his first concern was to extricate himself from the location. "All you hear is a whole lot of shooting coming towards you, and you don't know if that's a firefight or whether it's just a bunch of guys with automatic weapons wiping everybody out in their path." After the incident, Harper's first call was to his mother to reassure her.

The Ontario Provincial Police started two further investigations into the incident. After 22 October, the OPP started a review of the RCMP actions on Parliament Hill. On 29 October, the House of Commons Speaker asked the OPP to review the conduct of House of Commons constables. On 24 November, the RCMP asked the OPP to review Zehaf-Bibeau's actions from the Memorial to Parliament Hill. The RCMP will then act on revising its security after the reviews are complete. Until that time, the RCMP has increased its numbers around Parliament by rotating new officers for two-month terms to Parliament Hill security. The OPP report was released on the internet with redactions.

On 24 February 2015, the Canadian House of Commons public safety committee passed a motion to invite RCMP Commissioner Paulson to "publicly display and discuss the video" that Zehaf-Bibeau recorded at a future meeting of the committee. Commissioner Paulson showed the video (minus 18 seconds which the RCMP said might be pertinent to investigations into accomplices) at the public safety committee meeting of 6 March. Zehaf-Bibeau is quoted as saying: "This is in retaliation for Afghanistan and because Harper [Prime Minister Stephen Harper] wants to send his troops to Iraq. Canada's officially become one of our enemies by fighting and bombing us and creating a lot of terror in our countries and killing us and killing our innocents. So, just aiming to hit some soldiers just to show that you're not even safe in your own land, and you gotta be careful. We'll not cease until you guys decide to be a peaceful country and stay to your own and stop going to other countries and stop occupying and killing the righteous of us who are trying to bring back religious law in our countries. Thank you." The video was recorded in the car, in Ottawa, on the day of the shootings and was found in the car abandoned in front of Parliament. Paulson said he believes that someone else was involved, and if they were found to have aided Zehaf-Bibeau, that they would be charged with terrorism offences. Paulson also said a post-mortem test for drugs and alcohol on Zehaf-Bibeau was negative and that he had a long knife tied to his wrist when he was killed by Parliament Hill security.

Paulson further briefed Parliament that the RCMP has over 130 full-time investigators and staff on the case. Paulson reiterated the RCMP's position that Zehaf-Bibeau was a terrorist under Section 83.01 of the Criminal Code, and that he would have been charged with terrorism offences had he survived. OPP investigators also possess the security video taken inside the Parliament building when Zehaf-Bibeau was killed. The RCMP did not determine the source of the gun Zehaf-Bibeau used. They found witnesses to him loading it into his car.

On 29 May 2015, the RCMP released the full transcript of Zehaf-Bibeau's video. The missing 18 seconds included Zehaf-Bibeau asking God to praise his actions and curse those he is targeting.

In June 2015, the CBC reported some information from the OPP report. The CBC reported that Zehaf-Bibeau was hit 31 times by police including a shot to the back of the head by RCMP Constable Curtis Barrett after which the RCMP stopped firing. He was then hand-cuffed although he was already dead. Vickers himself shot 15 times. After entering the Centre Block, there was an exchange of gunfire between Zehaf-Bibeau and House of Commons Security Corporal Malo. Zehaf-Bibeau then ran down the Hall of Honour. House of Commons Security Constable Louis Letourneau shot at Zehaf-Bibeau 15 times, hitting him once, an event recorded on Centre Block security video. Four RCMP officers advanced on Zehaf-Bibeau, who took one more shot, narrowly missing RCMP Constable Barrett, then started a barrage at Zehaf-Bibeau. The OPP report concluded that the officers' actions were all justified. The OPP report also contained the information that it was determined that Zehaf-Bibeau shot Corporal Cirillo three times in the back at the War Memorial, not twice as was previously reported.

In October 2015, CTV News reported that it had obtained an "unredacted" copy of the OPP report. In it, it was reported that four RCMP officers were involved in the shootout: Const. Curtis Barrett, Const. Martin Fraser, Sgt. Rick Rozon and Cpl. Dany Daigle. According to CTV News, the constables were told after Kevin Vickers was applauded for his actions that "the Kevin Vickers train has left the station but you guys will get internal recognition." Recognition was to include a commissioner's commendation and recommendation for a Governor General's Award. According to CTV, the officers did not receive commendations and were on stress leave. Barrett would eventually be recognized after his involvement in the shooting was confirmed and previously lost.

The Royal Canadian Mounted Police established "Project Savvy" to pro-actively look for threats to Canadian security in open source media, including social networks.

== Quebec attack two days prior ==
The 2014 Saint-Jean-sur-Richelieu ramming attack occurred on 20 October, two days prior, where two Canadian Armed Forces soldiers were deliberately rammed by a car and one of those soldiers, Warrant Officer Patrice Vincent, age 53, subsequently died from injuries. Martin Couture-Rouleau was a 25-year-old Québécois who became a Muslim convert in 2013 and was a supporter of the Islamic State of Iraq and the Levant (ISIL). Rouleau used his car to run over the two soldiers before being fatally shot by police after an ensuing car chase.

The terror threat level in Canada was on 21 October raised to medium in light of the ramming attack and due to "an increase in online 'general chatter' from radical groups including Islamic State and al-Qaeda." In his address to the nation following the shootings on 22 October, Prime Minister Stephen Harper referred to the 20 October incident as an ISIL-inspired terrorist attack. Although both the 20 and 22 October attacks led to the death of Canadian soldiers, the Royal Canadian Mounted Police (RCMP) ruled out any direct connection between the attacks of 20 and 22 October.

Considerable media attention was paid to the ideology and pathology of Zehaf-Bibeau. Along with Martin Couture-Rouleau and Justin Bourque, he has been labelled a "lone-wolf terrorist". Couture-Rouleau and Zehaf-Bibeau were "both self-radicalized and adrift in their lives and connected in their sympathy to radical Islamic ideology." Other opinions diverged from simply calling Zehaf-Bibeau a terrorist. Andrea Polko, girlfriend of Nathan Cirillo said in a statement on Facebook that the dysfunctional state of the Canadian mental health care system was to blame for the shooting. Vancouver Sun columnist Ian Mulgrew commented on how the incident, as well as a failed bombing attempt in Victoria by persons motivated similarly to Zehaf-Bibeau, showed 'gaping holes' in the social security net. "These incidents are examples not of Muslim extremism but of the lack of community support for the dysfunctional of any faith who, with a lack of proper attention or the wrong catalyst, become dangerous. I know which approach would make me feel safer, what I would call real security measures: a social safety net that caught those in obvious need before they went postal, people like Zehaf-Bibeau." Further divergence of opinion appeared in the criticism of the government's labelling the shooting as a terrorist attack. James Baxter, editor-in-chief of ipolitics.ca, an Ottawa political 'zine, said "the government is exploiting two isolated murders to push through sweeping new surveillance powers" and pointed out "the would-be 'terrorists' involved were armed only with a car and a vintage hunting rifle". Journalist Linda McQuaig said "lots of hype about Canada and our institutions being under attack — even as it got harder to explain the difference between the 'terrorist' murders of two soldiers and the 'non-terrorist' murders of three RCMP officers in Moncton. The main difference appeared to be that the shooter in Moncton was not a follower of Islam". Academic Emer O'Toole said there was a double standard in the response by the Harper government relative to the 2014 Moncton shooting saying, "Harper's minimal statement after Justin Bourque shot and killed three Royal Canadian Mounted Police officers in Moncton, New Brunswick, in June, made no mention of terror. Yet Bourque's actions bore the hallmarks of a conservative and conspiratorial anti-state worldview reminiscent of Norwegian killer Anders Breivik. There was no appeal to Canadian solidarity in the face of an attack on "our country, our values, on our society"; there was no affirmation to "remain vigilant against those at home and abroad who would harm us."

An article in The Daily Beast suggested that the attacks by Couture-Rouleau and Zehaf-Bibeau were connected with the 2014 New York City hatchet attack. Like them, the New York attacker was labelled as a "lone wolf," although Siegel writes that those who are moved from anger to spontaneous deadly action most often fit the profiles of borderline psychotics more than hardcore believers. He cites a 2010 study by terrorism analyst Brian Jenkins of the RAND Corporation, which states that it would be more appropriate to describe "lone wolves" as "stray dogs" which, "while still dangerous, skulk about, sniffing at violence, vocally aggressive but skittish without backup."

== Perpetrator ==
Michael Zehaf-Bibeau attacking the National War Memorial on 22 October 2014

Michael Zehaf-Bibeau was born Joseph Paul Michael Bibeau on 16 October 1982 in Quebec City, Canada to Susan Bibeau, a Québécoise from Montreal, and Bulgasem Zehaf, a Libyan immigrant to Quebec. As his parents were unmarried his surname was given as his mother's last name. The couple reconciled a short while after Zehaf-Bibeau's birth and were married.

Zehaf-Bibeau grew up in Central Canada, including Ottawa and Montreal. His mother, Susan, worked as deputy chairperson of a division of Canada's Immigration and Refugee Board. His father, a businessman, opened the Tripoli café in Montreal. In 1995 his parents legally changed his name to Joseph Paul Michael Abdallah Bulgasem Zehaf-Bibeau to better reflect his heritage. The couple divorced in 1999. In his youth Zehaf-Bibeau became a habitual offender with an extensive criminal record for several offences, including larceny, drug possession, and parole violations. He had received several criminal convictions, at least one of which resulted in a custodial sentence of 60 days' incarceration. In November 2001, just after his 19th birthday, he was convicted of possessing a false credit card and impaired driving. In 2004, he pleaded guilty to drug possession for marijuana and PCP. He failed to appear at the trial date in 2006, but appeared three years later to plead guilty to marijuana possession and was given a discharge.

In 2004, previously being baptized as a Roman Catholic, he attended mosques in Burnaby and Vancouver, after he converted to Islam. He was requested to stop attending the mosque after upsetting religious elders who said he used to trip the mosque's fire alarms by trying to enter through the wrong doors "His behaviour was not normal," said David Ali, vice-president of the Masjid Al-Salaam mosque in Burnaby. "We try to be open to everyone. But people on drugs don't behave normally." Zehaf-Bibeau continued to live in the Montreal area until 2007 when he travelled to Libya with a Libyan passport he received in 2000, after which he moved to Western Canada to become a miner and labourer.

In 2011, he was charged with robbery and "uttering threats" in Vancouver, but only convicted of the lesser charge of uttering threats. He claimed that he committed the 2011 robbery so that he would be incarcerated, in order to kick his drug habit. He received a psychiatric evaluation, but was determined to be fit to stand for trial.

His father is reported to have fought in the 2011 Libyan Civil War; the Washington Times reported that Zehaf had returned to his hometown of Zawiyah in Libya to join the uprising against the Muammar Gaddafi regime.

Zehaf-Bibeau wanted to leave Canada. An associate of Zehaf-Bibeau reported he had discussed wanting to go to Libya to study Arabic and Islam. At their 23 October press conference, the RCMP said his mother told them that he wanted to go to Syria to join the anti-government rebels in the Syrian civil war, but she denied this, stating that she told the RCMP that he was intending to travel to Saudi Arabia. "He thought he would be happier in an Islamic country where they would share his beliefs."

=== Before the shootings ===
Zehaf-Bibeau arrived in Ottawa on or before 2 October, to pursue securing a passport. Zehaf-Bibeau had applied for a Canadian passport and a background check was in progress. RCMP Commissioner Bob Paulson said this issue was central in driving the attacks. Zehaf-Bibeau applied for a Libyan passport renewal on 2 October using a 2007 expired document but was refused the same day. Zehaf-Bibeau told officials that he wanted a new passport so he could visit family and friends in Libya.

Zehaf-Bibeau had been staying at the Ottawa Mission, a homeless shelter in Ottawa near Parliament Hill. According to other residents of the mission, Zehaf-Bibeau and two other men had been trying to get a vehicle. Others said of Zehaf-Bibeau and the other two men, "You knew they were up to something shifty, pacing around a lot and everything." The vehicle used by Zehaf-Bibeau was purchased one day before the shootings. One resident of the mission noted that Zehaf-Bibeau's mood had changed three days before the attacks, and he attributed it to Zehaf-Bibeau going back on drugs. Zehaf-Bibeau reportedly told the other residents that he was "anti-Canadian" and to pray because "the world is ending". Another resident reported that Zehaf-Bibeau had shown a lot of interest in the Parliament buildings, including asking how easy was it to get into the Parliament buildings.

A day before the attack, multiple witnesses saw Zehaf-Bibeau engaged in a "heated discussion" with another man while waiting to register his purchase of the vehicle used in the shootings. According to a witness, Zehaf-Bibeau said "If soldiers bombed your family, wouldn't you want to kill them?". Staff in the registry office asked him to lower his voice or leave. The purchase was disallowed by the office because of his out-of-province identification. The purchase was never registered and Zehaf-Bibeau pasted a piece of junk mail on the car to mimic a temporary license permit.

How Zehaf-Bibeau obtained his gun has not been determined. At the time of the shootings, Zehaf-Bibeau was legally prohibited from possessing or acquiring firearms. Additionally, his previous criminal charges and convictions, history of drug abuse, and lack of a fixed address all would have prevented him from receiving a Canadian Firearms Licence. A knife that Zehaf-Bibeau had with him on 22 October was determined to have originated from a relative's home.

=== After the shootings ===
On 15 November, it was reported that Zehaf-Bibeau's body had remained at the Ottawa coroner's office for examination. According to the procedure to be followed by the coroner, the examination must report the entry and exit wound of each gunshot wound, and a toxicology report. The issue of accepting his body for an eventual funeral was problematic for the Ottawa Muslim Association mosque: "while denouncing what he did as a crime, a terrorist attack against a soldier who was serving the country, we say that if he's believing in God, if he's a Muslim, then he should be buried," said imam Samy Metwally. "We will give him a funeral service." However, on 18 November, the coroner in an interview announced that the body was released "over a week ago". The coroner did not release the details of the autopsy, when the body was released or whom the body was released to, citing legal restrictions. On 26 February 2015, the Ottawa Citizen reported that Zehaf-Bibeau was buried in Zawiya, Libya, by arrangements made by his family. In a telephone interview with the press, Zehaf-Bibeau's mother said she grieves for the victims of the attack, not her son. In an email to the press, she also said "I am mad at my son," and said "he seemed lost and did not fit in."

== See also ==
- Paul Joseph Chartier (attempted to bomb the Canadian House of Commons in 1966)
- Denis Lortie (attempted to assassinate much of the National Assembly of Quebec in 1984)
- Charles Yacoub (drove a hijacked bus onto Parliament Hill in 1989)
- 2001 Indian Parliament attack
- 2006 Ontario terrorism plot
- 2017 Westminster attack
- 2017 Tehran attacks
- Quebec City mosque shooting, another extremist shooting in Canada.
- List of attacks on legislatures
