= Paul Joseph Chartier =

Canadian failed bomber

- Born: August 5, 1921; Bonnyville, Alberta, Canada
- Died: May 18, 1966 (aged 44); Ottawa, Ontario, Canada
- Occupation: Truck driver
- Known for: Failed bomb plot

Paul Joseph Chartier (August 5, 1921 – May 18, 1966) was a Canadian man who died when a bomb he was preparing exploded in a washroom of the Parliament of Canada. It is believed that he was preparing to bomb the House of Commons.

== Early life ==
Born in rural Alberta to parents who owned a small hotel, Chartier became a trucker at age 20. Chartier briefly worked in the mining industry in Yellowknife before joining the Royal Canadian Air Force during World War II. While in the Air Force, he got into some minor trouble before being discharged in 1945. In 1960, he ran into financial trouble and was forced to declare bankruptcy and sell his truck. He was also investigated for fraud and his marriage failed. Moving to Toronto, he settled in a rooming house on Major Street.

== Bomb plot ==
Before the attempted attack, Chartier had purchased ten sticks of dynamite in Newmarket, Ontario. After assembling a bomb, he travelled to Ottawa and entered the gallery of the House of Commons. At the time, visitors to Parliament were not searched. He watched the proceedings for a time, and then departed for a nearby washroom. There he lit the fuse of his dynamite-based bomb, likely intending to return to the gallery and throw it upon the Members of Parliament below. However, the bomb exploded as Chartier exited the washroom. He was carrying it in his right hand, and it blew off his arm and tore open his torso, killing him instantly, but harming no one else. The washroom was heavily damaged, but the thick wooden door contained the blast in that room. No other part of the Centre Block itself was seriously damaged.

In June 1966, Physician H. Alexander Heggtveit provided forensic evidence on the case. Heggtveit reported that copper fragments and powder burns associated with Chartier's injuries indicated that he had been carrying a shrapnel-type explosive device.

After his death, police found a number of writings and letters earlier sent to newspapers were uncovered. He stated that because of government actions, no one could afford to live and that politicians were rich and greedy. He attacked politicians and homosexuals in his writings. He wrote that his plan was to "exterminate as many members as possible," and that he was prepared to die in the process. He declared his desire to become "President [sic] of Canada", and stated that he would appoint Toronto alderman June Marks as his vice president. When police raided his apartment, they found several other sticks of dynamite.

== See also ==
- Denis Lortie, 1984 shooter who attacked the Quebec parliament National Assembly building and chamber
- Michael Zehaf-Bibeau, 2014 shooter who attacked the Canadian Parliament Buildings Centre Block
- List of attacks on legislatures
