= René Jalbert =

Canadian military officer (1921–1996)

Major René Jalbert CV CD
- Jalbert while serving as Black Rod

10th Gentleman Usher of the Black Rod
- In office July 10, 1985 – March 6, 1989
- Prime Minister: Brian Mulroney
- Preceded by: Claude Lajoie
- Succeeded by: Rene Gutknecht

Sergeant-at-Arms of the National Assembly of Quebec
- In office March 1975 – July 1985
- Premier: René Lévesque

Personal details
- Born: 20 February 1921
- Died: 21 January 1996 (aged 74)
- Resting place: Quebec City, Quebec
- Awards: Cross of Valour

Military service
- Branch/service: Canadian Army
- Years of service: c. 1939–1969
- Rank: Major
- Unit: Royal 22nd Regiment
- Battles/wars: World War II; Korean War

René Marc Jalbert CV CD (20 February 1921 – 21 January 1996) was a retired Canadian Forces officer and sergeant-at-arms of the National Assembly of Quebec, known for his role in ending Denis Lortie's killing spree in the Parliament Building on 8 May 1984. Later he was Usher of the Black Rod for the Parliament of Canada.

== Military career ==
Jalbert served in World War II and the Korean War, ultimately attaining the rank of major in the Royal 22^{e} Régiment.

== Sergeant-at-arms ==
After his military career, he was sergeant-at-arms in the National Assembly of Quebec, beginning in March 1975.

On 8 May 1984, Denis Lortie entered the Parliament Building in the morning, before government business had begun, killing three government employees and wounding 13 others on his way to the Assembly Chamber. Upon learning of Lortie's presence, Jalbert entered the Assembly Chamber. Seeing Lortie in uniform, Jalbert showed the gunman his identification as a military veteran, opening a dialogue with him. Jalbert convinced Lortie to allow several employees to leave the premises. Then he invited Lortie into his downstairs office to discuss the situation, in effect setting himself up as hostage while removing Lortie from the scene. At extreme personal risk, Jalbert spent four hours persuading Lortie to surrender to police.

Jalbert's actions almost certainly prevented a higher death toll. For his bravery, Jalbert was awarded the Cross of Valour, Canada's highest civilian award for bravery, which was presented to him 9 November 1984, by Governor General Jeanne Sauvé in a ceremony at Rideau Hall, Ottawa.

The award citation reads:

In a rare display of coolheadedness and courage, René Jalbert, Sergeant-at-Arms at the Quebec National Assembly, subdued a man who had killed three people and wounded thirteen more on the morning of 8 May 1984. The man had entered a side door of the National Assembly building and immediately opened fire with a submachine-gun; moments later he climbed the main staircase toward the assembly chamber, known as the Blue Room, shooting repeatedly, and then burst into the chamber. As bullets peppered the wall, Mr. Jalbert entered the Blue Room and with icy calm convinced the man to allow several employees to leave the premises. Then he invited the heavily armed man into his downstairs office, in effect setting himself up as hostage while removing the man from the scene. At extreme personal risk, but with unflinching authority, Mr. Jalbert spent four hours persuading the man to surrender to police. The audacity of this retired Major of the Royal 22nd Regiment, a Second World War and Korean War veteran, almost certainly prevented a higher death toll.

== Usher of the black rod and legacy ==
From July 1985 to March 1989, Jalbert was Usher of the Black Rod in the federal Parliament of Canada in Ottawa, the most senior protocol position in the Parliamentary staff.

Jalbert died at age 74 in 1996. His younger brother was film and television actor Pierre Jalbert, who died in 2014.

In 2006 a street in Quebec City was named after René Jalbert.

== Awards and decorations ==
Jalbert's personal awards and decorations include the following:

Ribbon	Description	Notes
	Cross of Valour (Canada) (CV)	Awarded (CV) on 15 July 1984
	WW2 1939–1945 Star	1939–1945, WW2
	WW2 France and Germany Star	1939–1945, WW2
	WW2 Defence Medal (United Kingdom)	1939–1945, WW2
	WW2 Canadian Volunteer Service Medal	with Overseas Service bar
	WW2 War Medal 1939–1945	WWII 1939–1945, WW2
	Canadian Volunteer Service Medal for Korea	
	Special Service Medal	with NATO-OTAN Clasp
	Korea Medal	United Nations 1950–1953
	United Nations Medal	United Nations Peacekeeping Force in Cyprus – UNFICYP
	International Commission for Supervision and Control Medal	Indo-China, 1954–1973
	Queen Elizabeth II Silver Jubilee Medal	Decoration awarded in 1977; Canadian version
	125th Anniversary of the Confederation of Canada Medal	Decoration awarded in 1992
	Canadian Forces' Decoration (CD)	with one Clasp for 22 years of services

Parliament of Canada
Preceded by Claude Lajoie	Usher of the Black Rod; July 1985 – March 1989	Succeeded by René Gutknecht
