= Denis Lortie =

Canadian mass shooter (born 1959)

- Born: Joseph Laurent Paul Denis Lortie; March 10, 1959 (age 67); Quebec, Canada
- Occupation: Military supply technician
- Spouses: Lisa Lévesque (divorced); Unknown woman (married after release)
- Status: Full parole in 1996
- Motive: Anger over the Parti Québécois's advocating of a Francophone identity for Quebec, as well as alleged mental illness.
- Conviction: Second-degree murder in 1987
- Penalty: Life imprisonment with no parole for ten years

Details
- Date: May 8, 1984
- Locations: Parliament Building, Quebec City, Canada
- Targets: Premier René Lévesque, and other members of the governing Parti Québécois
- Killed: 3
- Injured: 13
- Weapons: Two C-1 (L2A3) Submachine guns (9 mm NATO); Inglis pistol (9 mm); Knife
- Military career
- Relatives: Two children
- Allegiance: Canada
- Branch: Canadian Forces (Logistics Branch)
- Service years: 1970s–1984
- Rank: Corporal
- Units: CFS Carp
- Other work: Convenience store clerk (after release)

Denis Lortie (born March 10, 1959) is a former Canadian Forces corporal. In 1984, he stormed into the Parliament Building in Quebec City and opened fire with several firearms, killing three government employees and wounding thirteen others. The National Assembly's serjeant-at-arms, René Jalbert, volunteered himself to serve as a hostage, and conversed with Lortie for several hours before convincing him to surrender to authorities.

After an earlier 1985 conviction of first-degree murder was overturned by the Quebec Court of Appeal, Lortie pleaded guilty to reduced charges of second-degree murder in 1987, for which he was convicted and sentenced to life imprisonment with no parole for ten years. Lortie was granted day parole in 1995, then full parole in 1996.

== Life ==
Denis Lortie was born in Quebec on March 10, 1959, as the youngest son of eight children. His exact birthplace within Quebec is not publicly known. Lortie and all his siblings were physically and sexually abused by their father for many years. Lortie's father reportedly fathered a child with one of his daughters. One of the Lortie siblings finally informed the police of the abuses in the late 1960s. In 1969, Lortie's father was sent to federal prison for three years. In 1972, Lortie's father finished incarceration but never returned to his family.

Lortie joined the Canadian Forces in the late 1970s after finishing high school in Quebec. Lortie served in the Logistics Branch at CFB Borden, CFB Valcartier, CFB Halifax and CFS Carp. On December 27, 1980, Lortie married Lisa Lévesque in Quebec City, and he was posted to CFB Halifax the following year. The couple had a son in 1982 and a daughter in 1983. At the time of the shooting, Lortie was posted to CFS Carp, near Ottawa, was ranked a corporal, and worked as a supply technician.

Lortie was bilingual in French and English. But even while speaking French, his native language, he encountered pronunciation difficulties. This resulted in irregular and halting speech. Lortie blamed his social and professional failures on his inability to speak English flawlessly, and was keenly aware that his poor English reinforced negative stereotypes of Francophones and Québécois. After the birth of his daughter, Lortie worried that he would become abusive in the manner of his father, and contemplated killing himself and his family before placing blame on the governing pro-sovereignty Parti Québécois for his problems, disliking the party's advocacy of a "Francophone identity" for Quebec. Lortie planned the killing spree as a means of broadcasting his discontent.

== Events ==
=== Before the shooting ===
On May 7, 1984, Lortie left the CFS Carp military base, pretending that he needed time off to arrange a divorce with his wife. Lortie had previously attempted to secure leave from his base, but was refused. It was during this encounter that Lortie later claimed he saw the face of his father on the face of the officer that denied his request. He rented a car, drove to Quebec City and took a guided tour of the Parliament Building. He then rented a room in a motel for the night.

The next day, May 8, 1984, at 9:30 a.m., Lortie walked into CJRP radio station in Quebec City, identified himself as "Mr. D", and dropped off a sealed envelope containing an audiotape for one of the station's hosts, André Arthur. He instructed the radio staff not to open the envelope until 10:30 a.m., but they opened it anyway, discovering that it was a statement of Lortie's plans, in which he declared, "The government now in power is going to be destroyed." By the time CJRP staff contacted police, Lortie's plan was already under way.

=== Shooting ===
At 9:45 a.m., Lortie entered the Parliament Building through a side door located on Grande-Allée. He was dressed in combat uniform and armed with two C-1 submachine guns, an Inglis pistol, a duffel bag containing four hundred rounds of 9 mm NATO ammunition, as well as a knife strapped to his leg. As he entered the building, he shot and mortally wounded a receptionist, then killed a messenger whom he encountered in a corridor. He then went into a smoking room and shot and wounded a person there before moving to the cafeteria, but finally found his way into the Assembly Chamber, outside of which dozens of armed Sûreté du Québec (SQ) officers, as well as more than a dozen Groupe d'intervention operatives and Quebec City Police (many carrying M2 carbines), helicopters, and snipers were taking position.

Based on later testimony, it is clear that he intended to assassinate Premier René Lévesque and other members of the governing Parti Québécois. His plan was to enter the Assembly Chamber during the parliamentary committee meeting, which was starting at 10:00 a.m. that morning. Instead of wearing a watch, Lortie timed his attack by listening to CJRP and waited for host André Arthur to end his segment. On that day, Arthur ended his broadcast 20 minutes early, leading Lortie to enter the building and make his way to the Assembly Chamber while it was mostly empty. He opened fire on the government employees still inside, killing one and wounding eleven.

=== Lortie's surrender ===
The National Assembly's sergeant-at-arms, René Jalbert, was informed that there was a man in military uniform with a gun in the Assembly Chamber. Upon stepping out of the elevator, Lortie asked him why he came, and fired his C-1 submachine gun inches from his face.

Jalbert told him that he too had been a soldier, with the Royal 22^{e} Régiment, and that if Lortie would allow it, he would show him his discharge card. Lortie agreed, after which Jalbert persuaded him to show his own identification.

After this exchange, Jalbert persuaded Lortie to come into his office to discuss the matter, and release the other civilians in the Assembly Chamber. Jalbert talked to Lortie for more than four hours, ultimately promising him that he would be able to surrender to military police (since he was unwilling to surrender to civilian police). At 2:15 p.m., Lortie surrendered to officers of the SQ, Quebec City Police Service, and the National Assembly security.

For his actions, which likely prevented further death, Jalbert was awarded the Cross of Valour several months later, in the same National Assembly chamber that Lortie had burst into.

=== Victims ===
The following were killed in the shooting:

- Georges Boyer
- Camille Lepage (separate from Camille Lepage, who was also a victim of homicide)
- Roger Lefrançois

== Aftermath ==
One of the contributing factors to the shooting, allegedly, was the easy access that Lortie had to both weapons and ammunition. Unlike other non-combat Canadian Forces Bases, CFS Carp, the base at which he was stationed, apparently did not have an armoury, or even ammunition lockers.

According to psychiatrist Pierre Mailloux, who was assigned to the case, Lortie had paranoid schizophrenia and had organized his crime during a psychotic episode, believing that he was acting on instructions given to him from God. Nevertheless, in 1985, Lortie was convicted of first-degree murder, but a new trial was ordered when the Quebec Court of Appeal determined the trial judge had made errors while instructing jurors about how they should weigh testimony from the psychiatrists heard in the case.

Lortie pleaded guilty to reduced charges of second-degree murder in 1987.

In 1995, Lortie was released on day parole to a halfway house in Hull, Quebec, after being released from a minimum security correctional facility north of Montreal where he had been undergoing psychiatric treatment, classes to deal with aggression, and serving a life sentence with no eligibility for parole for 10 years. According to the Parole Board of Canada, Lortie no longer posed a threat to society, and "patched his life together despite being responsible for one of the most notorious events in Quebec history."

Under the release terms, Lortie was required to spend every night at the halfway house between 11:00 p.m. and 7:00 a.m. He was also required to let parole board supervisors know where he was at all times, and was restricted to a 40-kilometre (25 mi) radius from the house. The relatives of some of Lortie's victims believed he was not punished severely enough, with some believing he should have been executed, a punishment that could not be applied in the civilian courts, as Canada abolished the death penalty for murder in 1976, though technically possible at the time via the Canadian Forces military justice system.

Lortie was granted full parole in July 1996 and, as of 2007, was married, with a steady job and a house, and had reportedly been forthcoming with "the people who monitor his case".

== See also ==
- Michael Zehaf-Bibeau, a 2014 shooter who attacked the Canadian Parliament Buildings Centre Block
- Paul Joseph Chartier, who attempted to bomb the Canadian Parliament Building in Ottawa in 1966
- List of rampage killers in the Americas
- List of attacks on legislatures
