= List of lone wolf terrorist attacks =

List of international mass shootings and lone wolf terrorist attacks

This article lists lone wolf terrorist attacks.

== Africa, the Middle East and Asia ==
- On 15 November 1988, Barend Strydom, an Afrikaner, shot and killed seven people, and wounded 15 more, in and around Strijdom Square, Pretoria, South Africa. He declared that he was the leader of the White Wolves organisation, which proved to be a figment of his imagination.
- On 24 February 1994, Israeli Baruch Goldstein, a former member of the Jewish Defense League and follower of the Kahanist movement, opened fire inside the Cave of the Patriarchs in Hebron, killing 29 people and injuring at least 100.
- On 19 March 2005, Egyptian national Omar Ahmad Abdullah Ali detonated a car bomb outside a theatre filled with Westerners in Doha, Qatar, killing a British director and injuring 12 others. Police believe he was acting alone.
- On 4 August 2005, Israeli Eden Natan-Zada, an alleged Kahanist, killed four Israeli Arabs on a bus and wounded 12 before being killed by other passengers. Natan-Zada was a 19-year-old soldier who had deserted his unit after he refused to remove settlers from the Gaza Strip.
- Less than two weeks later, on 17 August 2005, Asher Weisgan, a 40-year-old Israeli bus-driver, shot and killed four Palestinians and injured two others in the West Bank settlement of Shiloh. He later committed suicide whilst in jail.
- On 4 September 2006, Nabil Ahmad Jaoura, a Jordanian of Palestinian origin, opened fire on tourists at the Roman Amphitheatre in Amman, Jordan. One British tourist died and six others, including five tourists, were injured. Police said he was not connected with any organized group, but was angered by Western and Israeli actions in the Middle East.
- On 6 March 2008, Alaa Abu Dhein opened fire on a Jewish seminary in Jerusalem, killing eight and injuring 11 before he himself was shot dead. His family denied he was a member of any militant group, and described him as intensely religious.
- On 2 July 2008, Husam Taysir Dwayat attacked several cars with a front-end loader. He killed three Israelis and injured dozens more before being shot to death. He was not a member of any militant group.
- On 22 September 2008, a Palestinian man drove his BMW into a crowd of civilians and off-duty IGF soldiers, injuring 19 people. The perpetrator was later shot and killed by an off-duty soldier.
- On 19 August 2010, a Uyghur man was suspected in having planted a bicycle bomb in Aksu that killed at least 7 people and injured 14 others.
- In January 2011, Salman Taseer, the governor of Punjab, Pakistan was assassinated by a lone wolf.
- 4 August 2014: A man in Jerusalem drove a tractor into a group of pedestrians, killing 1 person and injuring 5 others, before crashing the tractor into a city bus and repeatedly hitting it with the mechanical arm of the tractor. The perpetrator was shot and killed by a police officer.
- On 1 December 2014: Hungarian-American Ibolya Ryan was stabbed to death in Abu Dhabi, United Arab Emirates, by an attacker apparently targeting a random foreigner. The convicted Emirati killer was reported to have been executed in the UAE in 2015.
- 3 October 2015: a series of knife stabbings around Israel occurred, including the Lions' Gate stabbings, this spate of attacks by lone-wolf Palestinians has sometimes been dubbed the "Knife Intifada." These occurred through the early months of 2016, then became sporadic. Social media incitement is considered as a possible cause for many of these attacks.
- 30 July 2020: in Sange, DRC, Sergeant Longo Dhendonga killed 14 and injured 10 people. He was a member of the military, police, or a comparable force at the time of the rampage. The killer was sentenced to death.

== Europe ==
- During late 1991 and early 1992 in Sweden, John Ausonius, a far-right extremist, shot eleven people who he considered to be immigrants, killing one.
- In February 1992, RUC Constable Allen Moore shot three Catholic men dead with a shotgun in Sinn Féin head office on the Falls Road, West Belfast. Moore committed suicide shortly afterwards before he could be apprehended or arrested.
- Between 1993 and 1997 in Austria, Franz Fuchs engaged in a campaign against foreigners, and organizations and individuals he believed to be friendly to foreigners. He killed four people and injured 15, some seriously, using three improvised explosive devices and five waves of 25 mail bombs in total.
- In April 1999 in London, David Copeland targeted black people, Asians and gay men with nail bombs, killing three and injuring 129. His aim was to start a race war. He was sentenced to at least 50 years and is now in a secure mental hospital.
- On 6 May 2002, in the Netherlands, nine days before elections, Dutch politician Pim Fortuyn was murdered by Volkert van der Graaf, who said that he killed the politician for his having exploited Muslims as "scapegoats."
- On 11 May 2006, a Belgian student Hans Van Themsche shot and killed a Malian au pair and the 2-year-old child she was caring for, before being caught by police. He told police he targeted people of different skin color.
- Between 2009–2010, Peter Mangs targeted people in Malmö, Sweden who had dark skin, and who he deemed to be "non-Swedish". Altogether, the attacks killed 2 people and injured 13 others.
- On 22 July 2011, in Norway, Norwegian Anders Behring Breivik killed 77 people in two consecutive attacks. First, he killed eight people with a heavy car-bomb placed in the heart of the Norwegian government headquarters in Oslo. An hour later, he appeared at the summer camp of the Worker's Youth League, the youth organization of the Labour Party, at the island of Utøya, 35 kilometers west of Oslo. He shot for approximately 90 minutes, killing 69 people. Anders Behring Breivik written a manifesto in preparation for the attacks titled 2083: A European Declaration of Independence, in which he blamed Islam and "Cultural Marxism" for what he described as the "cultural suicide" of Western Europe.
- In 2012, Islamist Mohammed Merah killed seven people in the city of Toulouse, France. He was eventually killed after a 32-hour siege at his flat in the city.
- On 26 May 2013, in La Défense, France, a man stabbed soldier Cédric Cordier in the throat. Cordier was hospitalized, but officials said his throat wound was not life-threatening. The man, named as Alexandre Dhaussy, was a convert to Islam.
- On 20 December 2014, in Joué-lès-Tours, France, a Burundi-born French national attacked the local police station with a knife while shouting 'Allahu Akbar'. He injured three police officers before he was shot dead.
- On 23 October 2015, Anton Lundin Pettersson attacked a school in Trollhättan, Sweden, which killed 3 and injured 1. Pettersson was shot and killed by police.
- On 16 June 2016, in Birstall, West Yorkshire, United Kingdom, Thomas Mair, a neo-Nazi and white nationalist apartheid supporter murdered Jo Cox, a Labour Party Member of Parliament (MP). The attack occurred exactly one week before the UK's referendum on EU membership.
- On 14 July 2016, Mohamed Lahouaiej-Bouhlel drove a truck into crowds celebrating Bastille Day in Nice, France killing 86 people.
- On 19 June 2017, Darren Osborne drove his van into Muslims at Finsbury Park Mosque in Finsbury Park, London, United Kingdom killing at least 1 person and injuring nine others.
- On 18 August 2017, Abderrahman Bouanane stabbed 10 people in the city of Turku, Finland, causing several critical injuries and killing 2 people.
- On 3 February 2018, Luca Traini, a neo-Nazi and former Lega Nord member, shot and injured six African migrants in Macerata, Italy.
- On 12 October 2020, Danijel Bezuk shot and injured a police officer in front of the office of the Prime Minister of Croatia in Zagreb, Croatia.
- On 12 August 2021, in Plymouth, United Kingdom, Jake Davison shot and killed his mother and other people, including a toddler and her father, in various streets, park, and their homes with a total of 6 fatalities, before killing himself on Henderson Place.
- On 15 October 2021, in Leigh-on-Sea, Essex, United Kingdom, Islamic State supporter Ali Harbi Ali stabbed to death David Amess, a Conservative Party MP.

== United States ==
=== 1990–2009 ===
- On 25 January 1993, Pakistani national Mir Aimal Kansi shot CIA employees in their cars as they were waiting at a stoplight, killing two and injuring three others. He reportedly got angry watching news reports of attacks on Muslims and stated his motive was that he was "angry with the policy of the U.S. government in the Middle East, particularly toward the Palestinian people".
- On 10 March 1993, American anti-abortion extremist Michael Frederick Griffin murdered Dr. David Gunn in Pensacola, Florida, shooting him three times in the back. Reportedly he yelled, "Don't kill any more babies", just before the shooting.
- On 6 August 1993, American Neo-Nazi Jonathan Preston Haynes shot and killed Wilmette, Illinois plastic surgeon Dr. Martin Sullivan, claiming that he wanted to warn the world about the coming extinction of Aryans. Haynes also confessed to the unsolved 1987 killing of San Francisco hairstylist Frank Ringi.
- On 1 March 1994, on the Brooklyn Bridge in New York City, Lebanese-born immigrant Rashid Baz shot at a van of 15 Chabad-Lubavitch Orthodox Jewish students that was traveling on the bridge, killing one and injuring three others.
- On 29 July 1994, Dr. John Britton and his bodyguard James Barrett were killed by American anti-abortion extremist Paul Jennings Hill with a shotgun blast to their heads. Mr. Barrett's wife, June Barrett, a retired nurse, was injured in the attack. Hill was sentenced to death by lethal injection and was executed on 3 September 2003.
- On 16 September 1994, white supremacist, anti-government extremist, and self-proclaimed assassin for the Citizens for the Kingdom of Christ Timothy Thomas Coombs shot Missouri Highway Patrol Corporal Bobbie J. Harper through the chest in the kitchen of his McDonald County, Missouri home. Colonel Fred Mills, chief of the Missouri Highway Patrol, later said he believed Harper was shot in retaliation for an incident three months earlier, when Harper and other officers arrested Robert N. Joos on charges of "simulating legal process" for serving "people's court" papers. Coombs was never caught.
- On 30 December 1994, anti-abortion extremist John C. Salvi III carried out fatal shootings at two Planned Parenthood reproductive health clinics in Brookline, Massachusetts, killing two and wounding five.
- Timothy McVeigh is often given as a classic example of the "lone wolf". McVeigh was convicted and executed for the 19 April 1995 Oklahoma City bombing, which killed 168 people and injured hundreds with a truck bomb. Though McVeigh conceived, planned and carried out the bombing, he did not act alone. Terry Nichols was convicted of conspiring with him, though his involvement was limited to helping construct the explosive device; Nichols was apparently unaware of what the bomb was for.
- Between 1978 and 1995, Theodore "Ted" Kaczynski, known as the "Unabomber", engaged in a mail bombing campaign that killed three and wounded 23. He threatened to continue the bombings unless his anti-industrial manifesto was published by The New York Times, which acquiesced.
- On 9 October 1995, an unknown saboteur pulled spikes from the rails and overrode the railroad's safety system near Palo Verde, Arizona, causing the Sunset Limited train to derail, killing Mitchell Bates, a sleeping car attendant, and injuring 78 passengers, 12 of them critically. Four identical notes signed "Sons of the Gestapo" claiming to be from an anti-government, anti-police terror cell were found at the accident site. No one has been arrested for the crime.
- Between 1996 and 1998, Eric Rudolph engaged in a series of bombings against civilians in the Southern United States, resulting in the deaths of three people and injuries to at least 150 others. His targets included abortion clinics, gay nightclubs, and the 1996 Olympics in Atlanta.
- On 12 April 1996, anti-government white supremacist Larry Wayne Shoemaker shot eight African Americans in Jackson, Mississippi before committing suicide.
- Between 1996 and December 2001, anti-abortion extremist Clayton Waagner sent envelopes to more than 500 abortion providers containing a white powder and a note which said, "You have been exposed to anthrax. We are going to kill all of you. From the Army of God, Virginia Dare Chapter." For the anthrax letter spree, he received a 53-count indictment, and on 3 December 2003, he was convicted on 51 of the 53 counts, including charges of violating the Freedom of Access to Clinic Entrances Act, threatening the use of weapons of mass destruction, and mailing threatening communications. He was sentenced to 19 years in a federal prison.
- On 16 January 1997, anti-abortion extremist Eric Rudolph set two bombs to explode, one an hour after the first, destroying the Sandy Springs Professional Building in Atlanta, containing the Atlanta Northside Family Planning Service. The second blast is apparently designed to injure or kill responders such as firemen, paramedics, and others responding to the first blast. Seven people are injured in the blasts.
- On 19 August 1997, self-declared sovereign citizen Carl Drega opened fire on two New Hampshire state troopers following a traffic stop, killing both of them. Drega then stole one of the officers' Police Car, drove to the office of Colebrook, New Hampshire District Court judge Vickie Bunnell, shooting her in the back when she tried to flee, then shot & killed Dennis Joos, editor of the local Colebrook News and Sentinel, as he attempted to disarm Drega after Bunnell fell. Drega then returned to his property and set his house on fire, and wounded three other law enforcement officers before being shot to death in a firefight with police.
- On 23 February 1997, Ali Hassan Abu Kamal opened fire in the observation deck of the Empire State Building, killing one and wounding six others before committing suicide.
- On 26 March 1997, Michigan Militia activist Brendon Blasz is arrested for plotting to bomb the federal building in Battle Creek, Michigan, the IRS building in Portage, Michigan, a Kalamazoo television station, and federal armories.
- On 23 April 1997, Neo-Nazi National Alliance member Todd Vanbiber was arrested with approximately 12 pipe bombs after accidentally setting off one he was building. The bombs were part of a series of bank robberies Vanbiber was carrying out to help fund the National Alliance.
- During the weekend of 2–4 July 1998, Benjamin Nathaniel Smith, a white supremacist and member of the white separatist organization now known as the Creativity Movement, embarked upon a three-day, two-state shooting spree, targeting racial and religious minorities across Illinois and Indiana. Smith also shot at but missed another nine people. On Sunday, 4 July, while fleeing the police in a high-speed chase on a southern Illinois highway, Smith shot himself twice in the head and crashed his automobile into a metal post. He then shot himself again, in the heart, this time fatally. He was later pronounced dead at the hospital.
- On 23 October 1998, anti-abortion extremist James Charles Kopp assassinated Dr. Barnett Slepian as Dr. Slepian made his son soup in their kitchen after attending his father's funeral. The FBI notes that Dr. Slepian's assassination bears much similarity to shootings in the Rochester, New York area, and three Canadian cities during the fall of 1997, in which abortion doctors were shot in their homes. Kopp has been charged by Canadian authorities in the 1995 shooting of an Ontario, Canada doctor, Hugh Short, one of a string of Remembrance Day Shootings.
- On 29 October 1998, sovereign citizen Scott Joseph Merrill shot a county road worker in Emery County, Utah in an ambush-style attack. Merrill claimed that he acted on a commandment from God to kill the county road worker, believing this commandment to supersede Utah law.
- On 29 January 1999, white supremacist Paul Warner Powell killed 16-year-old Stacie Reed because he was angry that she had a black boyfriend. Powell then waited, for Stacie's 14-year-old sister, Kristie Reed, to come home from school. When she did, Powell raped her, slashed her throat, stabbed her, and left her for dead. Kristie survived the attack and was able to testify against Powell.
- On 3 April 1999, Neo-Nazi skinhead Jessy Joe Roten fired shots into the home of a multi-racial family in St. Petersburg, Florida, killing 6-year-old Ashley Mance, and wounding her twin sister Aleesha and younger half-sister Jailene Jones.
- On 15 May 1999, anti-government extremist Kim Michael Cook shot and killed Palmer, Alaska police officer James Rowland Jr. during a welfare check. Authorities believe that Cook killed the officer in ambush because of his hatred of law enforcement.
- On 10 August 1999, Buford O. Furrow, Jr., a member of the white supremacist group Aryan Nations, attacked a Jewish daycare in Los Angeles, injuring five, and subsequently shot dead a Filipino American mail carrier.
- On 28 April 2000, white supremacist Richard Scott Baumhammers began a racially motivated crime spree in Pittsburgh, Pennsylvania which left five individuals dead and one paralyzed. Baumhammers was pulled over in his Jeep and arrested at 3:30 p.m. EST in the town of Ambridge, Pennsylvania. Baumhammers' spree lasted two hours, and ran a 15-mile trail that crossed three townships.
- On 13 October 2000, Palestinian American Ramses "Ramzi" Uthman set an arson fire in the Temple Beth El in Syracuse, New York, causing extensive damage to the temple building. According to an acquaintance's testimony, after Uthman set fire to the Temple, he yelled "I did this for you, God!"
- In May 2002, Lucas John Helder placed a series of 18 pipe bombs packed with BBs and nails in mailboxes across the US, rigging to explode as the mailboxes were opened, injuring 6, including 4 mail carriers. Helder sent a manifesto to The Badger Herald of the University of Wisconsin–Madison, decrying "government control of our daily lives", complaining of the illegality of marijuana, and promoting astral projection as a method to reach a higher level of consciousness.
- On 4 July 2002, Egyptian-American Hesham Mohamed Hadayet opened fire at an El Al ticket stand at Los Angeles International Airport (LAX), killing two before Hadayet was shot dead by an injured El Al security officer.
- On 3 March 2006, Mohammed Reza Taheri-azar drove a Jeep Cherokee into a crowd of students at University of North Carolina at Chapel Hill, injuring nine people. Press accounts said that he "matches the modern profile of the unaffiliated, lone-wolf terrorist".
- On 28 July 2006, Naveed Afzal Haq, saying "I am a Muslim American, angry at Israel", perpetrated the Seattle Jewish Federation shooting in the Belltown neighborhood of Seattle, killing one woman and wounding five others.
- On 27 July 2008, Jim David Adkisson fired a shotgun at members of the Knoxville, Tennessee Unitarian Universalist church congregation during a youth performance of a musical, killing two people and wounding seven others. After his arrest, Adkisson said that he was motivated by hatred of Democrats, liberals, African Americans and homosexuals.
- On 31 May 2009, anti-abortion activist Scott Roeder murdered obstetrician and abortion provider George Tiller.
- On 10 June 2009, white supremacist, Holocaust denier, and Neo-Nazi James Wenneker von Brunn drove his car to the 14th Street entrance of the United States Holocaust Memorial Museum in Washington, D.C., shooting Museum Special Police Officer Stephen Tyrone Johns when he opened the door, killing him. Two other Special Police Officers stationed with Officer Johns, Harry Weeks and Jason "Mac" McCuiston, returned fire, wounding von Brunn with a shot to the face. While awaiting trial, von Brunn died on 6 January 2010.

=== 2010 ===
- On 18 February 2010, Joseph Andrew Stack III flew a small personal plane into an office complex containing an IRS office in Austin, Texas after posting a manifesto on his website stating his anti-government motives and burning his house. Stack was killed as was one person in the office. 13 people were injured.
- On 4 March 2010, John Patrick Bedell, a self-proclaimed Libertarian and 9/11 truther, shot and wounded two Pentagon police officers at a security checkpoint in the Pentagon Station of the Washington Metro rapid transit system in Arlington County, Virginia, just outside Washington, D.C. The officers returned fire, striking him in the head. He died a few hours later, on the next day, 5 March 2010.
- On 10 May 2010, Sandlin Matthew Smith set off a pipe bomb at the rear entrance of the Islamic Center of Northeast Florida. No one is injured in the attack, but authorities found remnants of the pipe bomb at the scene, and shrapnel from the blast was found a hundred yards away. FBI agents later learned Smith was staying in a tent in Glass Mountain State Park in northwest Oklahoma. When approached by federal and state law enforcement officers Smith drew a firearm, and was fatally shot.
- On 18 July 2010, 45-year-old convicted felon Byron Williams was stopped by a CHP officer for speeding & weaving through traffic on I-580 in Oakland, California. After being approached by the officer, Williams or the officer began firing with a handgun. As additional CHP officers arrived on scene Williams started firing an M1A .308 rifle, and the CHP returned fire, firing a collective 198 rounds from pistols, shotguns, and .223 rifles, hitting Williams multiple times in the arms & legs. Oakland police confirmed at Williams' 20 July arraignment that Williams planned to target the San Francisco offices of the American Civil Liberties Union of Northern California and the Tides Foundation. Investigators reported Williams told them he wanted to "start a revolution by traveling to San Francisco and killing people of importance at the Tides Foundation and the ACLU."
- On 17 August 2010, 29-year-old Patrick Gray Sharp parked his truck and trailer in front of the Texas Department of Public Safety building in McKinney, Texas about 30 miles north of Dallas. Sharp set fire to the truck, which contained spare ammunition, and attempted to set fire to the trailer, which was believed to contain an improvised explosive device. Sharp then opened fire on the building's offices and windows, on employees who were outside, and on first responders with multiple firearms. Responding police returned fire, and when they reached Sharp found him dead of a gunshot.
- On 1 September 2010, James J. Lee, an Anti-immigrant environmental activist armed with two starter pistols and an explosive device, took three people hostage inside of the Discovery Communications headquarters in Silver Spring, Maryland. Mr. Lee was shot & killed by police after a 4-hour standoff.
- On 2 September 2010, school bus driver and self-proclaimed member of the "American Nationalist Brotherhood" Donny Eugene Mower threw a Molotov cocktail through the window of the Madera Planned Parenthood clinic. After being arrested Mower also acknowledged having vandalized a local mosque.
- On 26 November 2010, Somali-American student Mohamed Osman Mohamud is arrested by the FBI in a sting operation after attempting to set off what he thought was a car bomb at a Christmas tree lighting in Portland, Oregon. He was charged with attempting to use a weapon of mass destruction.
- On 28 November 2010, 24-year-old Cody Seth Crawford firebombed the Salman Al-Farisi Islamic Center in Corvallis, Oregon in response to Mohamed Osman Mohamud's attempted car bombing of a Portland, Oregon Christmas tree lighting.

=== 2011 ===
- On 17 January 2011, a Neo-Nazi and racist with connections to the National Alliance, Kevin William Harpham, placed a radio-controlled pipe bomb on the route of that year's Martin Luther King Jr. memorial march in Spokane, Washington. The bomb was discovered before it was exploded, the parade was rerouted, and the bomb defused.
- On 21 July 2011, Sovereign Citizen Joseph M. Tesi was stopped by a Colleyville, Texas Police officer for multiple traffic warrants. Tesi exited his vehicle with a gun drawn and pointing at the officer, the officer drew his weapon in response, and there was an exchange of gunfire, during which Tesi was struck in the face and foot. Tesi, a member of the Moorish National Republic Sovereign Citizen movement, had previously sent letters to the court about his traffic warrants threatening to use "deadly force" if any Police officer attempted to arrest him on his own property.

=== 2012 ===
- On 1 April 2012, Francis G. Grady put an incendiary device in a window of the Grand Chute, Wisconsin Planned Parenthood clinic, causing a small fire which damaged the building but injured no one.
- On 17 June 2012, Anson Chi, a fugitive and tax protester accidentally injured himself while attempting to blow up a Plano, Texas natural gas pipeline. Police officers find an explosive device, bomb making chemicals & equipment, and books on terrorism in his bedroom in his parents house.
- On 5 August 2012, 40-year-old white supremacist and neo-Nazi Wade Michael Page fatally shot six people and wounded four others at a Sikh temple in Oak Creek, Wisconsin. Page took his life by shooting himself in the head after he was shot in the stomach by a responding police officer.
- On 15 August 2012, Floyd Lee Corkins II shot a security guard, Leonardo Johnson, at the office building housing the Family Research Council in Washington D.C. Corkins later “said the SPLC's 'hate group map'" had led him to the FRC and he had "intended to kill as many people as possible and smother the Chick-fil-A sandwiches into their faces. Among other things, he said, 'Chick-fil-A came out against gay marriage so I was going to use that as a statement'." On 19 September 2013, Corkins was sentenced to 25 years in prison on three felony charges, including a terrorism offense.

=== 2013 ===
- On 15 April 2013, Dzhokhar and Tamerlan Tsarnaev set off two pressure cooker bombs at the finish line of the 2013 Boston Marathon, killing three people and wounding over 260 others. Tamerlan Tsarnaev was killed in the aftermath.
- On 1 November 2013, Paul Anthony Ciancia, aged 23, is accused of opening fire in Terminal 3 of the Los Angeles International Airport with a .223-caliber Smith & Wesson M&P15 rifle, killing a U.S. Federal Transportation Security Administration officer and injuring several other people. After the shooting ended, Ciancia was found to be carrying a note stating that he "wanted to kill TSA" and describing them as "pigs".

=== 2014 ===
- On 13 April 2014, Frazier Glenn Miller, Jr., former Grand Dragon of the Carolina Knights of the Ku Klux Klan, leader of the White Patriot Party, neo-Nazi Odinist, advocate of white nationalism, white separatism, and a proponent of anti-Semitic conspiracy theories, opened fire at a Jewish Community Center and at a retirement home in Overland Park, Kansas, killing 3.
- On 6 June 2014, sovereign citizen Dennis Marx drove up to the Forsyth County, Georgia court house with a rented SUV full of improvised explosives, guns, ammunition, smoke grenades, and supplies, while wearing body armor and more explosive devices, ostensibly to plead guilty to charges of possessing marijuana with the intent to distribute. Marx was spotted by Forsyth County Sheriff Deputy James Rush while the deputy was performing a routine security sweep outside the court house, exchanged gunfire with Marx, the sound of which alerted deputies within the court house, 8 of whom opened fire on Marx, killing him.
- On 8 June 2014, anti-government conspiracy theorists & former Bundy Ranch protesters Jerad and Amanda Miller shot and killed two Las Vegas police officers at a restaurant before fleeing into a Walmart, where they killed an intervening armed civilian. The couple died after engaging responding officers in a shootout; police shot and killed Jerad Miller, while Amanda Miller committed suicide after being wounded.
- On 11 August 2014, Sovereign Citizen Douglas Lee Leguin started a dumpster fire in an upscale Dallas suburb, planning to occupy a house there as his own sovereign nation, opening fire on fire & police first responders before surrendering to SWAT officers.
- On 23 October 2014, in the 2014 New York City hatchet attack, a radicalized Islamic convert, Zale F. Thompson, charged at 4 NYPD officers with a hatchet, injuring two. The other two officers shot Thompson to death.
- On 28 November 2014, self-proclaimed member of the Phineas Priesthood Larry Steve McQuilliams went into downtown Austin, Texas with firebombs, and improvised explosive devices firing over 100 shots into the Austin Police headquarters, the Federal Courthouse, the Mexican Consulate (which he also attempted to firebomb), and a local bank, before being killed by a mounted Austin Police officer with a 1 handed 312 feet shot through the heart.
- On 20 December 2014, a black Muslim American, Ismaaiyl Abdullah Brinsley, shot and killed Rafael Ramos and Wenjian Liu – two on-duty New York City Police Department (NYPD) officers – in the Bedford–Stuyvesant neighborhood of Brooklyn. The killings were an act of vengeance for the deaths of Eric Garner and Michael Brown, both black men reported by police as resisting arrest.

=== 2015 ===
- On 3 May 2015, two men fired rifles outside an exhibit featuring cartoon images of Muhammad at the Curtis Culwell Center in Garland, Texas. A security officer was injured and the men were killed by police.
- On 17 June 2015, Dylann Roof went into the Emanuel African Methodist Episcopal Church in Charleston, South Carolina and shot nine black people. Roof had written a manifesto The Last Rhodesian citing the Council of Conservative Citizens (CCC) and alleged "black-on-white crime" as motivations for the shooting.
- On 23 July 2015, John Russell Houser attacked a theatre in Lafayette, Louisiana showing the film Trainwreck (starring Amy Schumer). The attack ended in the deaths of two women, as well as Houser. Nine (9) others were injured. Houser had posted on various online political forums and had written a journal expressing racist, white nationalist, anti-Semitic, misogynistic and homophobic views as well as expressing support for Adolf Hitler, Oklahoma City bomber Timothy McVeigh and Charleston church shooter Dylann Roof.
- On 4 November 2015, Faisal Mohammed stabbed and injured four people with a hunting knife on the campus of the University of California, Merced in Merced, California. He was then shot dead by university police. Mohammad's history was put under investigation by federal authorities due to questions raised about possible Islamism inspired lone wolf terrorism. The Federal Bureau of Investigation eventually concluded that Mohammad was inspired to commit the attack by the Islamic State of Iraq and the Levant.
- On 2 December 2015, in the 2015 San Bernardino attack, 14 people were killed and 22 injured in an Islamic extremism-inspired mass shooting at the San Bernardino County Department of Public Health training event and holiday party. The perpetrators were a married couple, Rizwan Farook and Tashfeen Malik, who were both killed in the aftermath.

=== 2016 ===
- On 7 January 2016, a self-radicalized lone wolf gunman, Edward Archer, targeted and shot a uniformed Philadelphia police officer. The wounded officer shot Archer, who later claimed he had pledged allegiance to ISIS.
- On 12 June 2016, in the Orlando nightclub shooting, Omar Mateen, a 29-year-old Muslim American of Afghan descent, opened fire at the Pulse gay nightclub, killing 49 people and wounding 53 others. At the time, it was the deadliest mass shooting in the United States until the 2017 Las Vegas Shooting a year later. He pledged allegiance to ISIL during the attack.
- On 17–19 September 2016, there were four bombings or bombing attempts in Seaside Park, New Jersey; Manhattan, New York; and Elizabeth, New Jersey. Thirty-one civilians were injured in one of the bombings. Ahmad Khan Rahami was identified as a suspect in all of the incidents and apprehended on 19 September in Linden, New Jersey, after a shootout that injured three police officers. According to authorities, Rahami was not part of a terrorist cell, but was motivated and inspired by the extremist Islamic ideology espoused by al-Qaeda founder Osama bin Laden and al-Qaeda chief propagandist Anwar al-Awlaki.
- On 28 November 2016, in the Ohio State University attack, a car ramming attack and mass stabbing occurred at 9:52 a.m. EST at Ohio State University (OSU)'s Watts Hall in Columbus, Ohio. The attacker, Somali refugee Abdul Razak Ali Artan, was shot and killed by the first responding OSU police officer, and 11 people were hospitalized for injuries. According to authorities, Artan was inspired by terrorist propaganda from the Islamic State and radical Muslim cleric Anwar al-Awlaki.

=== 2017 ===
- On 18 April 2017, Kori Ali Muhammad committed a shooting spree in which 4 white men died in Fresno, California. Kori Ali Muhammad was a black nationalist who supported the Moorish Science Temple of America and the Nation of Islam as well as Micah Xavier Johnson (who killed 5 police officers in Dallas, Texas).
- On 14 June 2017, James Thomas Hodgkinson attacked the annual Congressional Baseball Game for Charity in Alexandria, Virginia where he shot and injured U.S. House Majority Whip Steve Scalise, Congressional aide Zack Barth, and lobbyist Matt Mika before engaging in a shootout with United States Capitol Police and the Alexandria Police Department. Two Capitol police officers were injured, including Crystal Giner. Hodgkinson died later in the hospital. He was a supporter of Democratic Party candidate Bernie Sanders in the 2016 presidential election, disliked Donald Trump, and deliberately targeted Scalise, Barth, and Mika, all of whom were Republican.
- On 24 September 2017, Emanuel Kidega Samson, a black nationalist, attacked the Burnette Chapel Church of Christ in Antioch, Tennessee, killing Melanie Crow and injuring six others. Samson's motivations for the shooting were in retaliation for the Charleston church shooting.

=== 2018 ===
- Between 22 October and 1 November, Cesar Sayoc, a registered Republican Party member from Aventura, Florida, sent various mail bombs to Democratic Party politicians and liberal media personalities across various cities in the United States (Katonah, New York, Chappaqua, New York, Washington, D.C., New York City, New York, Los Angeles, California, Sacramento, California, Burlingame, California, Wilmington, Delaware, New Castle, Delaware and Atlanta, Georgia). No one was killed. Sayoc would eventually be arrested for on 26 October and on 26 March 2019 would plead guilty to all 65 charges including usage of weapons of mass destruction in an attempted domestic terrorist attack.
- On 27 October, anti-Semitic Gab user Robert Bowers would violently attack Tree of Life - Or L'Simcha Congregation synagogue in Pittsburgh, Pennsylvania resulting in 11 killed and 7 injured (including the perpetrator). Bowers had blamed Jews for a supposed "white genocide". Robert Bowers was arrested and is facing 63 federal charges and 36 Pennsylvania state charges.

=== 2019 ===
- On 26 March, Holden Matthews, a Varg Vikernes fan and Black Metal artist burned and destroyed three black churches in Port Barre, Louisiana and Opelousas, Louisiana St. Mary Baptist Church, Greater Union Baptist Church and Mount Pleasant Baptist Church.
- On 27 April, John T. Earnest violently attacked the Chabad of Poway synagogue in Poway, California, killing an elderly Jewish woman and injuring three others. Earnest had published an anti-Semitic and racist open letter on 8chan /poi/ in which he blamed Jews for "the meticously [sic] planned genocide of the European race" and other ills, and claimed to have been inspired by the perpetrator of the Christchurch mosque shootings and the Pittsburgh synagogue shooting. Earnest attempted to livestream the shooting on Facebook but failed. He also admitted to vandalizing and burning Dar-ul-Arqam Mosque in Escondido, California on 24 March, leaving graffiti that said "For Brenton Tarrant, -t /pol/". Earnest was arrested and faces 109 federal charges.
- On 3 August, Patrick Crusius committed a domestic terrorist attack/mass shooting at Walmart in El Paso, Texas, killing 23 people and injuring 23 others in the deadliest incident of anti-Hispanic violence. Crusius had announced his terrorist attack on 8chan /pol/ where he published his Collin College notification letter and manifesto, in which he cited a supposed "Hispanic invasion of Texas" and "simply trying to defend my country from cultural and ethnic replacement" as motivations.

=== 2022 ===
- On 15 January, Malik Akram, a 44-year-old British Pakistani armed with a pistol, took four people hostage in the Congregation Beth Israel synagogue in Colleyville, Texas, during a Sabbath service. Hostage negotiations ensured, during which Akram demanded the release of Aafia Siddiqui. He released one hostage after six hours, and the remaining three hostages escaped eleven hours into the standoff. Tactical officers from the FBI Hostage Rescue Team subsequently entered the synagogue and fatally shot Akram. On 21 January, the FBI said it was investigating the incident as a "federal hate crime" and an "act of terrorism".
- On 14 May, Payton Gendron traveled to Buffalo, New York and shot 13 black people, killing 10 of them, in a supermarket, where he was captured. He was quickly taken into custody.

== Canada ==
- On 20 October 2014, in the 2014 Saint-Jean-sur-Richelieu ramming attack, the radicalized Saint-Jean-sur-Richelieu citizen Abu Ibrahim AlCanadi ran a soldier down and shot another. Couture-Rouleau was, in the aftermath, shot dead by an officer of the Sûreté du Québec.
- On 22 October 2014, Michael Zehaf-Bibeau opened fire at the National War Memorial, and fatally shot one soldier. The suspect ran to the Parliament of Canada. The suspect was then engaged in a shoot out with security and police forces.
- On 29 January 2017 in the Quebec City mosque shooting, Alexandre Bissonnette, a Political science student at the Université Laval, opened fire in the Islamic Cultural Centre of Quebec City and killed 6 people and injured 19 others.

== Australia ==
- On 15 December 2014, Lindt Café siege in Martin Place, Sydney ended with three deaths, including the suspect Man Haron Monis. There is doubt as to whether or not Monis fit the definition of a lone wolf terrorist. Queensland University of Technology criminologist Associate Professor Mark Lauchs said it was important the siege wasn't elevated to a "terrorist attack" as such. Associate Professor Lauchs said Monis was simply a deranged person running a hostage situation: "This incident was not about religion and neither was it a terrorist attack, but given that perception by the paraphernalia Monis used." The Australian Prime Minister Tony Abbott said, "[Man Haron Monis] had a long history of violent crime, infatuation with extremism and mental instability. As the siege unfolded yesterday, he sought to cloak his actions with the symbolism of the ISIL death cult." Former counter-terrorism adviser to the White House Richard Clarke said, "I don't think this was a lone wolf terrorist, I don't think this was a terrorist at all, I think this was someone who was committing suicide by police as a lot of people with mental problems do, and now, if they say they're a terrorist, if they say they're somehow associated with ISIS or Al Qaeda, it becomes a major event that shuts down the city and gets international attention. This was a person with a mental problem who tried to gain attention and succeeded, tried to shut down the city and succeeded, merely by putting up a flag that was something like the flag of ISIS."
- On 4 June 2019, Benjamin Glenn Hoffmann shot and killed 4 people firing at least 20 shots in Darwin, Northern Territory, Australia. The killer is convicted of murder and manslaughter.

== New Zealand ==
- On 15 March 2019, Brenton Harrison Tarrant, a self-described "Ethno-nationalist, Eco-fascist" "Kebab removalist" "racist", committed two consecutive terrorist attacks at Al Noor Mosque and Linwood Islamic Centre in Christchurch, New Zealand, killing 51 people and injuring 49 others. Tarrant had announced the attacks on social media outlets Facebook and Twitter, sharing links to his manifesto The Great Replacement, named after the French far-right white genocide theory of the same name by writer Renaud Camus. He also announced his attacks on 8chan /pol/. Tarrant livestreamed the first 17 minutes of the attacks on Facebook Live.
