= Murder of Brian Moore =

2015 shooting of a police officer in New York, USA

- Date: May 2, 2015
- Time: 6:15 p.m. EDT (UTC-4)
- Location: Queens, New York, U.S.
- Participants: Brian Moore, Erik Jansen, Demetrius Blackwell
- Outcome: Life without parole
- Suspects: Demetrius Blackwell
- Charges: First-degree murder

The murder of Brian Moore, a New York City police officer, took place on May 2, 2015, in Queens, New York, where he was shot. Moore died two days later at Jamaica Hospital Medical Center, at the age of 25. His partner, Erik Jansen, was shot at but escaped injury. Demetrius Blackwell was arrested in connection with the shooting, and was formally charged with first-degree murder, attempted first-degree murder, and other charges. On December 19, 2017, Blackwell was sentenced to life in prison with no chance of parole.

== Brian Moore ==
Brian Moore (June 30, 1989 – May 4, 2015) was the son of an NYPD Sergeant with whom he lived at the time he was shot. He grew up in North Massapequa, New York on Long Island and graduated from Plainedge High School in 2007. He made over 150 arrests during his five-year career.

== Events ==
On the night of May 2, Moore, who was on duty as a plainclothes officer at the time, and his partner, Erik Jansen, were patrolling around Queens Village, Queens, a residential neighborhood, when they saw a 35-year-old man, identified as Demetrius Blackwell, adjust his waistband. According to New York City Police Commissioner William Bratton, the officers then told Blackwell to stop, whereupon Blackwell turned and began firing shots into the officers' car. Police said that Blackwell fired at least two rounds into the car. Moore was shot in the head and his partner, Erik Jansen, was uninjured.

Moore was killed with a .38-caliber Taurus revolver that police believe was stolen from a shop in Perry, Georgia, on October 3, 2011.

== Legal proceedings ==
Blackwell was taken into custody on the night of the shooting and charged with assault, criminal possession of a weapon, and attempted murder. According to Bratton, Blackwell had a lengthy arrest record. After Moore died at Jamaica Hospital Medical Center, the district attorney of Queens County, Richard A. Brown, said that the charges filed against Blackwell would be elevated to include first-degree murder.

On June 11, 2015, Blackwell was indicted on charges of first-degree murder, first-degree attempted murder, aggravated assault on a police officer, first-degree assault, and weapons possession. He faced a maximum of life imprisonment without the possibility of parole if convicted of the first-degree murder charge.

A lawyer for Blackwell argued that his client, who struggled for years with seizures from severe epilepsy, had been wrongly identified as Moore’s assailant.

On November 9, 2017, Blackwell was found guilty on all counts. On December 19, 2017, Blackwell was sentenced to life in prison without the possibility of parole.

== Reactions ==
After Moore's death, Bill de Blasio, the mayor of New York City, said, "Our hearts are heavy today as we mourn the loss of police officer Brian Moore. For five years, Brian served with distinction, and he put his life on the line each day to keep us all safe." New York Governor Andrew Cuomo said, "The shooting of Officer Brian Moore over the weekend was a deplorable act of violence that has robbed New York of one of its finest." On May 5, the New York Mets wore NYPD hats and held a moment of silence before their game against the Baltimore Orioles that day. In July 2015, the City Council voted to rename an intersection after him; the street is to be called "Detective 1st Grade Brian Moore Way".

== Funeral ==
Moore's funeral mass was held on May 8, 2015, at St. James Roman Catholic Church in Seaford, New York. JetBlue offered free airfare to all police officers traveling to attend the funeral. Thousands of police officers from around the United States attended the mass, where Bratton posthumously promoted Moore to the rank of detective.

== See also ==
- 2014 killings of NYPD officers
- Murder of Darren Goforth
