= University of California, Merced stabbing attack =

Stabbing at UC Merced

- Location of Merced in the state of California.
- Location: 37°21′58″N 120°25′25″W; Merced, California, United States
- Date: November 4, 2015 c. 8:00 a.m. – c. 8:15 a.m. (PT)
- Target: Students and faculty at UC Merced
- Attack type: Mass stabbing, Islamic terrorism
- Weapon: Hunting knife
- Deaths: 1 (the perpetrator)
- Injuries: 4
- Perpetrator: Faisal Mohammad
- Motive: ISIS-inspired terrorism

On November 4, 2015, 18-year-old student Faisal Mohammad stabbed and injured four people with a hunting knife on the campus of the University of California, Merced, in Merced, California. He was subsequently shot and killed.

== Attack ==
The attack began at about 8:00 a.m. Pacific Time, and was over in about fifteen minutes. The first attacks took place near the center of campus, inside a classroom at the Classroom and Office Building, then continued outside the building until Mohammad was shot by UC Merced police officers. Two of the victims were airlifted to hospital; two were treated on campus for minor injuries.

Merced County Sheriff Vern Warnke stated that the weapon used in the attack was a hunting knife between 8 and 10 inches in length.

The planned attack (see below) was thwarted by a student, Tyler Patton, and construction worker, Byron Price, who was working in a nearby hallway. During Mohammad's initial attack, Patton attacked him with classroom furniture, disrupting the attack. Mohammad then tried to flee the room and ran into Price as Price was entering. Mohammad stabbed him in the side, then ran out of the room and down the stairs, attempting to stab more students as he fled. He then rushed out of the building and attacked a member of the university staff, stabbing her several times. Mohammad then fled across the Scholar's Lane pedestrian bridge at the center of campus, where two campus police officers gave chase, then shot and killed him. According to Price, Mohammad "looked scared" during the attack, but in addition to seeing fear "in his eyes," Price said, "He also looked like he was having fun... He was smiling."

An investigation found that the police had acted properly in shooting the attacker when he refused to drop his weapon and, instead, lunged at one of them.

== Victims ==
The stabbing victims included two students; one staff member; and Byron Price, an employee of a construction company who was at work on a building renovation when the stabbing began. All four victims suffered from non-life-threatening injuries, and recovered with no lifelong effects.

== Perpetrator ==
The attacker was identified as 18-year-old Faisal Mohammad (born October 25, 1997), a first-year student from Santa Clara. He graduated from Wilcox High School in 2015. The attacker's name had not been released on the day of the attack to give authorities time to contact the next of kin.

Mohammad was born in the United States. Authorities have found no indication that he suffered from mental illness. High school friends described him as a "pleasant, quiet boy" who enjoyed going to a mosque.

The backpack Mohammad was carrying contained "zip-tie handcuffs, two clear bags containing petroleum jelly, a night-vision scope, a safety hammer, two rolls of duct tape." The sheriff described the hammer as a "device used to break windows".

== Investigation ==
The Federal Bureau of Investigation (FBI) was brought into the investigation. On March 17, 2016, the FBI concluded that Mohammad was inspired by ISIS and that the attack was an instance of lone-wolf terrorism. ISIS propaganda was found on Mohammad's computer, and he was also found to have visited extremist websites in the days preceding the attack.

Mohammad left a manifesto in his pocket, detailing his plans. His original plan had been to use the tape to bind the other students to their desks and report the situation to police, steal a gun from a responding police officer, and use it to murder students who had refused to include him in their study group. He had also planned to cut someone's head off. He intended to spread the petroleum jelly on the floor to make responding police slip and fall while he stole their guns. Merced County Sheriff Vern Warnke initially said that although the manifesto made several references to Allah, the attack had nothing to do with religion or terrorism, and Mohammad was motivated by anger over being excluded from the study group.

Sheriff Warnke later amended his comments to state that new information had come to light on November 7, which had led to the Merced County Sheriff's Department handing formal control over the investigation to UC Merced and the FBI. A law enforcement official, speaking on the condition of anonymity to the Merced Sun-Star newspaper, stated that the style of clothing worn by the attacker, along with websites he had visited and a printout of an Islamic State of Iraq and the Levant (ISIS) flag found among his possessions, all contributed to the decision to hand control of the investigation to federal authorities.

The FBI categorically denies it was aware of any "derogatory information" about Mohammad or that he had been the subject of any federal investigation prior to the stabbing.

On December 11, Mohammad's roommate described him to federal investigators as "a loner and an extreme Muslim", also stating that he was not surprised by the incident. The roommate also recalled an incident when a friend had asked Mohammad what would happen if he touched the mat Mohammad used for praying and Mohammad had replied, "I will kill you."
