= 2014 Queens hatchet attack =

Attack on New York City police officers

Coordinates: 40.703740°N 73.799138°W

- Location: Jamaica, Queens, New York City, US
- Date: October 23, 2014 c. 2:00 p.m. EDT
- Attack type: Lone-wolf terrorism
- Weapon: Hatchet
- Deaths: 1 (the perpetrator)
- Injuries: 3 (2 officers directly, 1 civilian by stray gunfire)
- Perpetrator: Zale H. Thompson
- Motive: Islamic extremism

On October 23, 2014, a hatchet-wielding man, Zale H. Thompson, attacked four New York City Police Department (NYPD) officers on a crowded sidewalk in the Jamaica neighborhood of Queens in New York City. Officer Kenneth Healey was struck in the head, while Officer Joseph Meeker was injured in the arm. Also injured was a female civilian, who was struck by a stray bullet when two other officers shot and killed the perpetrator. Investigators discovered that Thompson was a recent Muslim convert. His attack was classified as an act of terrorism.

== Attack ==
On October 23, 2014, Thompson approached a group of four New York City police officers from behind in the rain on Jamaica Avenue. He had previously been hiding behind a bus shelter. They were posing for a photograph taken by a freelance photographer on Jamaica Avenue, near Union Hall Street.

Thompson took out an 18-inch (460 mm) metal hatchet from a backpack, charged the group and brought it down into the back of one of the officer's heads. In the ensuing altercation, a second officer was wounded and Thompson was shot dead by the two uninjured officers. Both of the wounded police officers had been on the job for only four months. While attempting to shoot Thompson, the officers also wounded a female civilian who was struck in the lower back by a stray bullet.

=== Victims ===
25-year-old police officer Kenneth Healey was critically wounded after Thompson's hatchet struck the side of his head and fractured his skull. Officer Joseph Meeker, 24, also suffered a slash wound to the right arm. In addition, a 29-year-old civilian woman suffered a gunshot wound in her lower back, which was inflicted by a stray bullet fired by police officers as they were shooting at Thompson. The woman was initially in critical condition, but was stabilized after doctors performed surgery on her. Officer Meeker was treated at a hospital, but was released on the same day. Officer Healey remained in a Queens hospital, listed in critical but stable condition until October 29, when he left the hospital by ambulance to a rehabilitation facility. He walked the last few steps into the ambulance while being cheered by 200 fellow officers and fans.

== Perpetrator ==
Zale H. Thompson (c. 1982 – October 23, 2014), also known as Zaim Farouq Abdul-Malik, was identified as the assailant. He was a graduate of the Rosa Parks Campus in Harlem, an adult-education program of the College of New Rochelle, and attended Teachers College, Columbia University from 2009 to 2010, but left before he could earn a degree. He also served in the U.S. Navy, being involuntarily discharged in 2003. Between 2002 and 2003, he had been arrested six different times in southern California for domestic disputes. When he was sixteen, he was the victim of an assault, although further details about the incident were unclear.

Thompson was described by acquaintances as an advocate of black power and was a recent convert to Islam. He had moved from Brooklyn to Queens before the attack. In the nine months preceding the attack, Thompson visited hundreds of websites regarding designated terrorist organizations, including al-Qaeda, al-Shabaab, and ISIL, as well as regarding "acts of violence." He also made several online posts railing against government, whites, injustices in American society, oppression abroad, and the Western world in general. On Facebook, he had an online conversation with another man regarding the topic of terrorism, although both of them derided the subject. Officials stated that Thompson was not tied to any international extremists or watch lists.

== Aftermath ==
NYPD Commissioner Bill Bratton described the attack as an "act of terror" on October 24. Police officers seized several computers from the home of Thompson's father and searched them.

The attack took place one day after the Ottawa Parliament shootings and three days after the Saint-Jean-sur-Richelieu ramming attack, both of which were carried out by recent converts to Islam, and were described as lone wolf terror attacks. Media attention on the Queens attack questioned whether it was motivated by the jihadist group ISIS encouraging sympathizers to carry out terror attacks in their home countries. An FBI intelligence assessment released in 2017, however, proposed that the attack was motivated by black separatist extremism. According to the FBI report, Thompson had tattoos indicating association with a known black separatist extremist group, and he previously expressed support for "mass revolt" against the "white-dominated" political system in his own writings. They further speculate that Thompson may have been motivated by the killing of Michael Brown in Ferguson, MO two months prior to the attack.

== See also ==
- 2014 shootings at Parliament Hill, Ottawa
- 2014 Saint-Jean-sur-Richelieu ramming attack
- 2016 shooting of Philadelphia police officer
- 2016 shooting of Dallas police officers
- Sidewalk clock on Jamaica Avenue
