= Murder of Rafael Ramos and Wenjian Liu =

2014 murders of two police officers in New York City

- Police investigating near the police car where Brinsley shot and killed Ramos and Liu

- Location: 40°41′45″N 73°56′47″W; Bedford–Stuyvesant, Brooklyn, New York, U.S.
- Date: December 20, 2014; 11 years ago 2:47 p.m. (EST)
- Attack type: Double homicide by shooting, murder–suicide, attempted femicide
- Weapon: Taurus PT92 handgun
- Deaths: 3 (including the perpetrator)
- Injuries: 1 (before the shooting)
- Perpetrator: Ismaaiyl Abdullah Brinsley
- Motive: Revenge for Eric Garner's and Michael Brown's killings.

On December 20, 2014, Rafael Ramos and Wenjian Liu – two on-duty New York City Police Department (NYPD) officers – were shot and killed by Ismaaiyl Abdullah Brinsley in the Bedford–Stuyvesant neighborhood of Brooklyn, United States. Brinsley then fled into the New York City Subway, where he killed himself. Earlier in the day, before he killed Ramos and Liu, Brinsley had shot and wounded his ex-girlfriend Shaneka Thompson in Baltimore.

== Background ==
The shooting occurred just weeks after a grand jury decided not to indict NYPD officer Daniel Pantaleo, who had killed Eric Garner on July 17, 2014. The grand jury's decision resulted in widespread protests in New York City and across the nation against police brutality and the lack of accountability for it. The protests also coincided with widespread protests in response to a grand jury's decision not to indict Darren Wilson, the police officer who fatally shot Michael Brown in Ferguson, Missouri, on August 9. Brinsley's attack on the police was allegedly motivated by outrage over the two deaths.

== Events ==
=== Shooting of Shaneka Thompson ===
Several hours before the killings, at 5:50 a.m., Brinsley entered the Owings Mills home of 29-year-old Shaneka Nicole Thompson, who had dated Brinsley for a few months before ending the relationship in October. Thompson stated that Brinsley had used a key he kept without her knowledge. He initially threatened to kill himself, pointing a gun at his head while Thompson attempted to calm him down, before Brinsley shot her in the stomach, stole Thompson's phone, and fled the scene. Brinsley called Thompson's mother, claiming he had shot her daughter by accident. He also called his mother and sister, telling them "it’s a wrap", leading them to believe that Brinsley was planning to kill them.

=== Travel to Brooklyn ===
Brinsley boarded a BoltBus, arriving in Manhattan at 10:50 a.m. His whereabouts for the next four hours are uncertain. At 12:20 p.m., Brinsley used Thompson's phone to make various social media posts on Facebook and Instagram, showing off his pistol and announcing his intention to kill two police officers as retribution for the recent deaths of Michael Brown and Eric Garner, writing: "I'm putting Wings on Pigs Today ... They Take 1 of Ours ... Lets Take 2 of Theirs. [sic]". Brinsley rode the subway to Brooklyn, and disposed of the phone at Atlantic Yards. A pair of men who encountered Brinsley in Bedford–Stuyvesant said that he asked them if the two were gang members before telling them. "Watch what I’m going to do".

==== Police contact ====
At 1:30 p.m., Thompson's mother called Baltimore County Police after she saw Brinsley's threat on Instagram, telling officers that he was likely heading for Brooklyn, where his old church congregation was located. Baltimore County Police began compiling information for a bulletin with Brinsley's description at 1:45 p.m. At 2:10 p.m. Baltimore County Police contacted the 70th Precinct of the NYPD about Brinsley's threats on Instagram. The phone call lasted around thirty minutes, during which the officer on call reviewed Brinsley's social media posts and received his photos. A fax of the bulletin was sent at 2:46 p.m., which the precinct received shortly after the shooting.

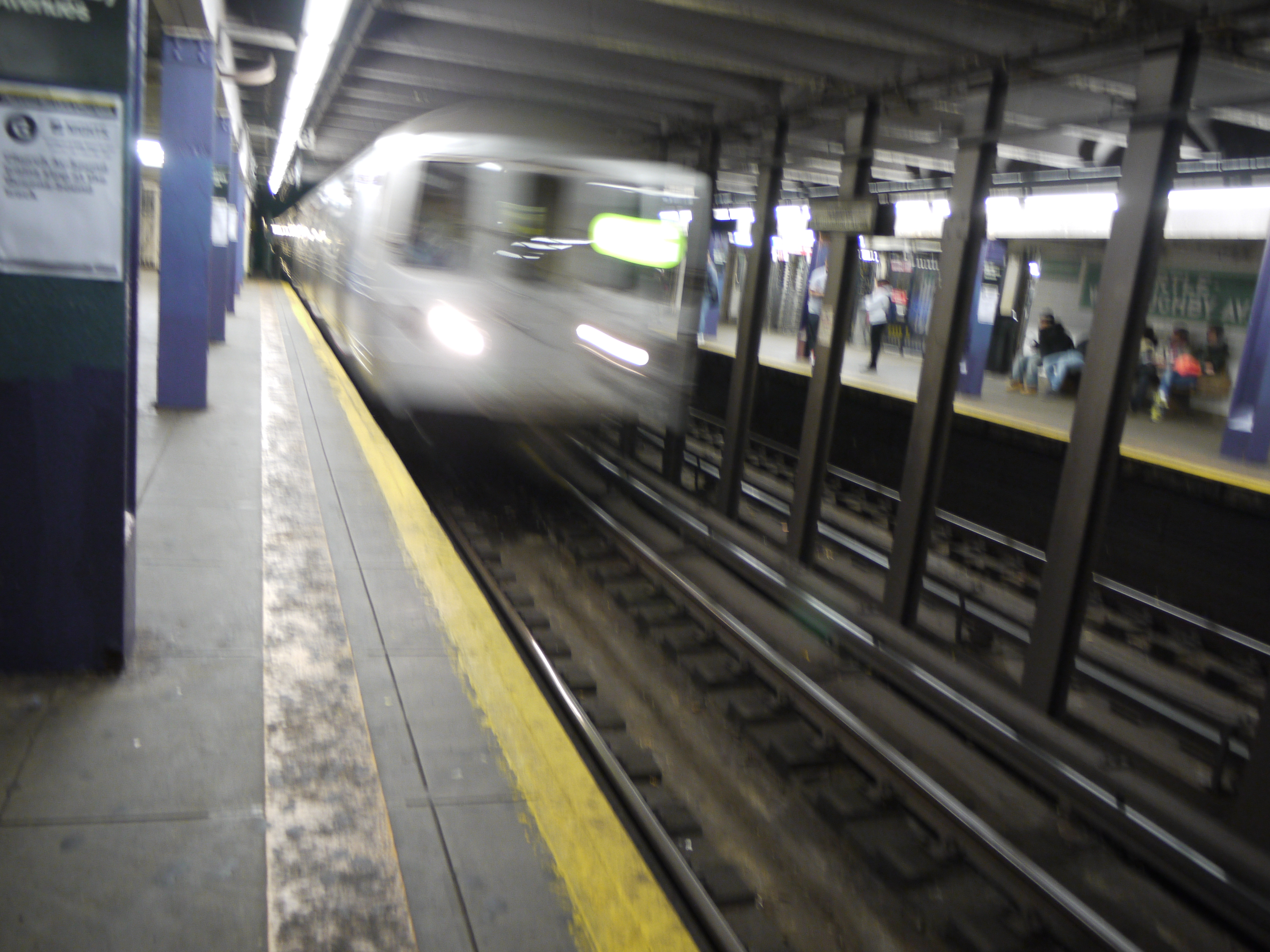
The Myrtle–Willoughby Avenues subway station, where Brinsley killed himself after fatally shooting Ramos and Liu

=== Killing of Rafael Ramos and Wenjian Liu ===
The second shooting occurred at Myrtle Avenue and Tompkins Avenue, a busy intersection in Brooklyn near the Tompkins Houses. Brinsley approached the passenger window of an NYPD patrol car occupied by Rafael Ramos, 40, and Wenjian Liu, 32, of Brooklyn's 84th Precinct. Both officers were sitting in the front seats and eating lunch. He then fired a semiautomatic handgun four times through the open window, striking Ramos and Liu in the head and upper body, killing both officers instantly. Two Con Ed workers who witnessed the shooting notified police.

After NYPD officers responding to the scene chased him onto the subway, he killed himself with the handgun in the Myrtle–Willoughby Avenues station (G train). Brinsley and the two police officers were taken to Woodhull Hospital, and all were pronounced dead on arrival.

== Officers killed ==
Official NYPD portraits of Rafael Ramos (left) and Wenjian Liu (right), who were killed in a shooting on December 20, 2014

=== Rafael Ramos ===
Rafael Ramos (December 9, 1974 – December 20, 2014), married and a father of two, resident of Glendale, Queens, had joined the NYPD as a school safety agent, before being promoted to officer in January 2012. He was born and raised in Sunset Park, Brooklyn, to Puerto Rican parents Rafael Ramos Sr. and Julia Romero. He was active in his church, Christ Tabernacle in Glendale, and had once studied at a seminary. He had just completed a training course to become a volunteer chaplain. He planned to eventually join the ministry when he retired from the police force.

The Silver Shield Foundation, founded by the late New York Yankees owner George Steinbrenner, announced it would pay for the education of Ramos' 13-year-old son, Jaden. Bowdoin College said it would provide full financial aid to Ramos' elder son, who was then a sophomore at the school, so he could complete his education.

A funeral service for both Officers Ramos and Liu, the largest police funeral in the city's history, was held on December 27 in Glendale with over 100,000 people present, including many politicians such as Vice President Joe Biden. The service was almost five hours long and was broadcast around the world, with many people coming from across the country to pay their respects to the slain officers. Afterward, Ramos' body was transported to St. John Cemetery in nearby Middle Village, where he was laid to rest. Hundreds of officers turned their backs to Mayor Bill de Blasio as he delivered his eulogy.

=== Wenjian Liu ===
Wenjian Liu (simplified Chinese: 刘文健; traditional Chinese: 劉文健; pinyin: Liú Wénjiàn; April 8, 1982 – December 20, 2014) was the only son of Chinese immigrants Weitang Liu and Xiuyan Li. He and his family came to the United States from Taishan, Guangdong, when he was 12 years old. He was a seven-year veteran officer of the NYPD who had married Peixia Chen in October 2014. He had no children at the time of his death.

Following a wake on January 3 containing elements of Chinese and Buddhist rituals, a funeral service for Liu took place on January 4 at the Ralph Aievoli & Son Funeral Home in Dyker Heights, Brooklyn. In protest of de Blasio's perceived lack of support for them, some attending police officers turned their backs on the video screen showing de Blasio's eulogy speech; however, de Blasio and NYPD Commissioner Bill Bratton were also saluted at the ceremony. Afterward, Liu's body was transported to Cypress Hills Cemetery in Cypress Hills, Brooklyn, and was laid to rest. After his burial, a post burial dinner, a Chinese tradition for honoring the deceased and giving his spirit a good send-off to heaven, was held in Sunset Park, Brooklyn.

On the night that Liu died, at the request of Chen, his widow, and with the approval of his family members, doctors retrieved and collected his semen for preservation to allow Chen the chance to conceive a child belonging to her and Liu. After being artificially inseminated, Chen successfully became pregnant and, in July 2017, gave birth to a girl named Angelina. In late 2021, Chen attempted to use her late husband's NYPD benefits plan to file for Child Survivor Benefits with the Social Security Administration for their daughter, but was initially denied twice due to an outdated legal definition of the term "biological parents"; moreover, the denial claim stated that Liu did not provide a signed consent with two witnesses to provide permission to use his sperm for conceiving a child. These hurdles were finally removed when Senator Andrew Gounardes, with the help of New York Governor Kathy Hochul, stepped in and had the law amended to recognize the validity of a child's biological parents having conceived him or her through in vitro fertilisation, and in the end, Chen was able to claim Child Survivor Benefits for her daughter.

== Perpetrator ==
Ismaaiyl Abdullah Brinsley (October 31, 1986 – December 20, 2014) was born in Brooklyn and raised in Atlanta. He had a long criminal record, including arrests for weapons possession and robbery, which amounted to a total of 19 arrests in Georgia and Ohio. He was convicted of felony gun possession in Georgia, where he was living at the time of the shooting. Before 2010, Brinsley was also arrested twice for threatening women. He allegedly had ties to the Black Guerrilla Family, a prison gang that was reportedly planning revenge attacks on police officers according to police informants, and the Nuwaubian Nation, a black-supremacist cult originating in Georgia. However, an unnamed federal law enforcement source has been quoted as saying there were no apparent ties. Daniel McCall, who was appointed to represent Brinsley in Georgia, said Brinsley was "not difficult to represent" and that no psychiatric problems were noticed at that time.

Brinsley was estranged from his family prior to the shooting. His parents divorced when Brinsley was 9 and according to his mother, Brinsley purposely failed classes and acted violent as a child, as this usually resulted in his father traveling over to see the family. He had a history of depression, having attempted suicide by hanging a year previously, and threatened to kill himself to a previous girlfriend in early December over his failure to achieve success in life. His mother also stated that Brinsley attempted suicide at age 14 after he was sexually abused. His family stated that Brinsley did not engage in anti-police activism, but the NYPD stated that he had made "very serious" anti-police posts on social media in the past.

== Reactions ==
=== Current and former government officials ===
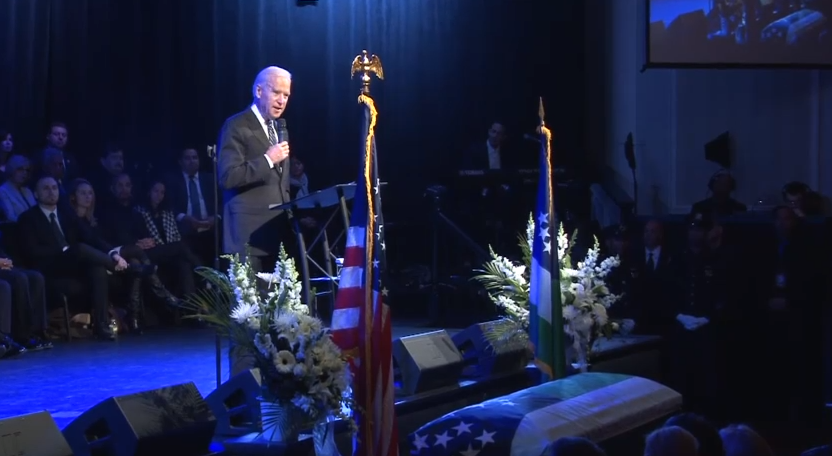
Vice President Joe Biden speaking at the funeral for Wenjian Liu and Rafael Ramos

U.S. President Barack Obama stated, "I unconditionally condemn today's murder of two police officers in New York City. Two brave men won't be going home to their loved ones tonight, and for that, there is no justification. The officers who serve and protect our communities risk their own safety for ours every single day – and they deserve our respect and gratitude every single day. Tonight, I ask people to reject violence and words that harm, and turn to words that heal – prayer, patient dialogue, and sympathy for the friends and family of the fallen."

Then-Brooklyn Borough President Eric Adams, a former police officer, said, "Those who were calling for police reform were not calling for police retribution... blood is not on the hands of the mayor."

Former New York Governor George Pataki blamed current officials. He tweeted, "Sickened by these barbaric acts, which sadly are a predictable outcome of divisive anti-cop rhetoric of Eric Holder and Mayor de Blasio." The former Mayor, Rudolph Giuliani, responded that this was untrue and categorized this rhetoric as an overreaction.

Former New York City Mayor Rudolph Giuliani accused Obama of creating a hostile environment toward the police, stating: "We've had four months of propaganda starting with the President, that everybody should hate the police. I don't care how you want to describe it, that's what those protests are all about."

=== NYPD officers and police union ===
As Mayor Bill de Blasio and his entourage walked through the third-floor corridor of Woodhull Hospital, where the two police officers had been pronounced dead hours earlier, dozens of NYPD police silently turned their backs on the mayor in protest for his perceived lack of support for them. Earlier, de Blasio had approached a group of cops in the hospital and told them, "We're all in this together." In response, one officer said, "No we're not."

The president of the police union group Patrolmen's Benevolent Association, Patrick J. Lynch, blamed de Blasio and the protesters of the grand jury dismissal in the Garner case for inciting hostility toward the NYPD. He said, "There's blood on many hands tonight. Those that incited violence on the street in the guise of protest, that tried to tear down what New York City police officers did every day. We tried to warn it must not go on, it shouldn't be tolerated. That blood on the hands starts at the steps of City Hall in the office of the mayor."

Fraternal Order of Police President Chuck Canterbury asked Congress to consider making crimes against police officers fall under the category of hate crimes. He said, "My thoughts and prayers over the past few weeks have been with the families of officers who were, with malice and forethought, gunned down just because they served as police officers."

=== Civil rights groups ===
Protest organizer Charles Wade said about civil rights groups, "We've all said that this is a horrible thing that shouldn't have happened. I say time and time again that I'm against police violence, and I'm not against police officers in general. I have an issue with improper policing, police violence and police impunity." Reverend Al Sharpton said, "From the beginning, we have stressed that this is a pursuit of justice to make the system work fairly for everyone. This is not about trying to take things into our own hands. That does not solve the problem of police brutality."

The National Association for the Advancement of Colored People issued a statement condemning the killings.

=== Public ===
Pastor Michael A. Walrond Jr. of the First Corinthian Baptist Church in Harlem, said, "This tragic moment may be an opportunity for people to understand each other. The pain of a mother whose son lay dead on the ground is the same pain of a 13-year-old boy who lost his police officer father. My hope is that this will shock people into coming together."

According to The Daily Beast, some bystanders at the crime scene reportedly cheered and expressed their support for the attack.

=== Entertainment ===
Many rappers, such as Azealia Banks, and Lecrae, also posted to Twitter, denouncing the murder-suicide.

Rapper The Game tweeted, "I guess y'all 'can't breathe' either", referring to the slogan "I can't breathe", resulting in backlash.

=== Media ===
Bob McManus, a columnist for the New York Post, criticized government officials for failing to condemn the blood-lust of protesters who demanded "dead cops" in retaliation for the death of Eric Garner. While not blaming the shooting on political leaders, an editorial in The Wall Street Journal argued that political leaders failed to respond to the protesters' chant – "What do we want? Dead cops." – and that such a failure "contributed to a public climate of suspicion and hate against police in which a man like Ismaaiyl Brinsley can in his deranged mind think it is justified to stalk and execute two cops on the beat." Newsday defended New York City Mayor de Blasio, saying he did not create the animosity towards the police, which is long standing in some quarters; the editorial pointed out that the Mayor spoke out against previous physical attacks on police officers by protesters.

As a result of the protest movement, there have also been calls to reform or abolish the grand jury process.

=== Families ===
Jaden Ramos, son of Officer Ramos, posted on Facebook, "Today I had to say bye to my father. He was [there] for me every day of my life, he was the best father I could ask for. It's horrible that someone gets shot dead just for being a police officer. Everyone says they hate cops but they are the people that they call for help. I will always love you and I will never forget you. RIP Dad."

Richard Gonzales, a cousin of Ramos, urged citizens to come together and forgive the shooter.

== Aftermath ==
On December 22, de Blasio asked that anti-police protestors "suspend demonstrations." Earlier in the day, NYPD Commissioner William Bratton said the killings were a "direct spinoff of this issue [of the protests]". Some protesters issued blanket condemnations of the police as "racists and worse" according to The New York Times. While the investigations into Brinsley's motivation continues, Bratton has concluded that "the protests served as an inspiration for the disturbed man."

Six people were arrested for making terrorist threats against NYPD officers in the week following the shooting. After a police union directive in December 2014, police were ordered to send two cars in response to every call. This resulted in a lack of police resources, and as a result, a 94 percent drop in summonses for minor offenses and a 66 percent reduction in arrests.

=== Beating of Karim Baker ===
In April 2016, officers Angelo Pampena and Robert Carbone were charged with the retaliatory beating of mail carrier Karim Baker, who unwittingly provided Brinsley with directions. The beating was alleged to have occurred when the officers approached Baker in October 2015; according to the Queens district attorney, Baker was seated in his car when the officers punched and kicked him multiple times and dragged him from his car. Baker's lawyer said Baker sustained injuries to his spine, knee and face, causing Baker to be unable to return to work. Pampena stated in a criminal court complaint that the officers approached Baker because he had parked his car directly in front of a fire hydrant, but surveillance video footage showed Baker's car parked more than 15 feet away from the fire hydrant. There were audio recordings of the encounter based on calls to 911 from Baker's cellphone during the time. The criminal case against Baker was dropped with the file sealed. In March 2017, they were found not guilty of all charges by judge Michael Aloise, and their case was sealed. However, a lawsuit filed by Baker was settled for $1.5 million in October 2019.

== Commemorations ==
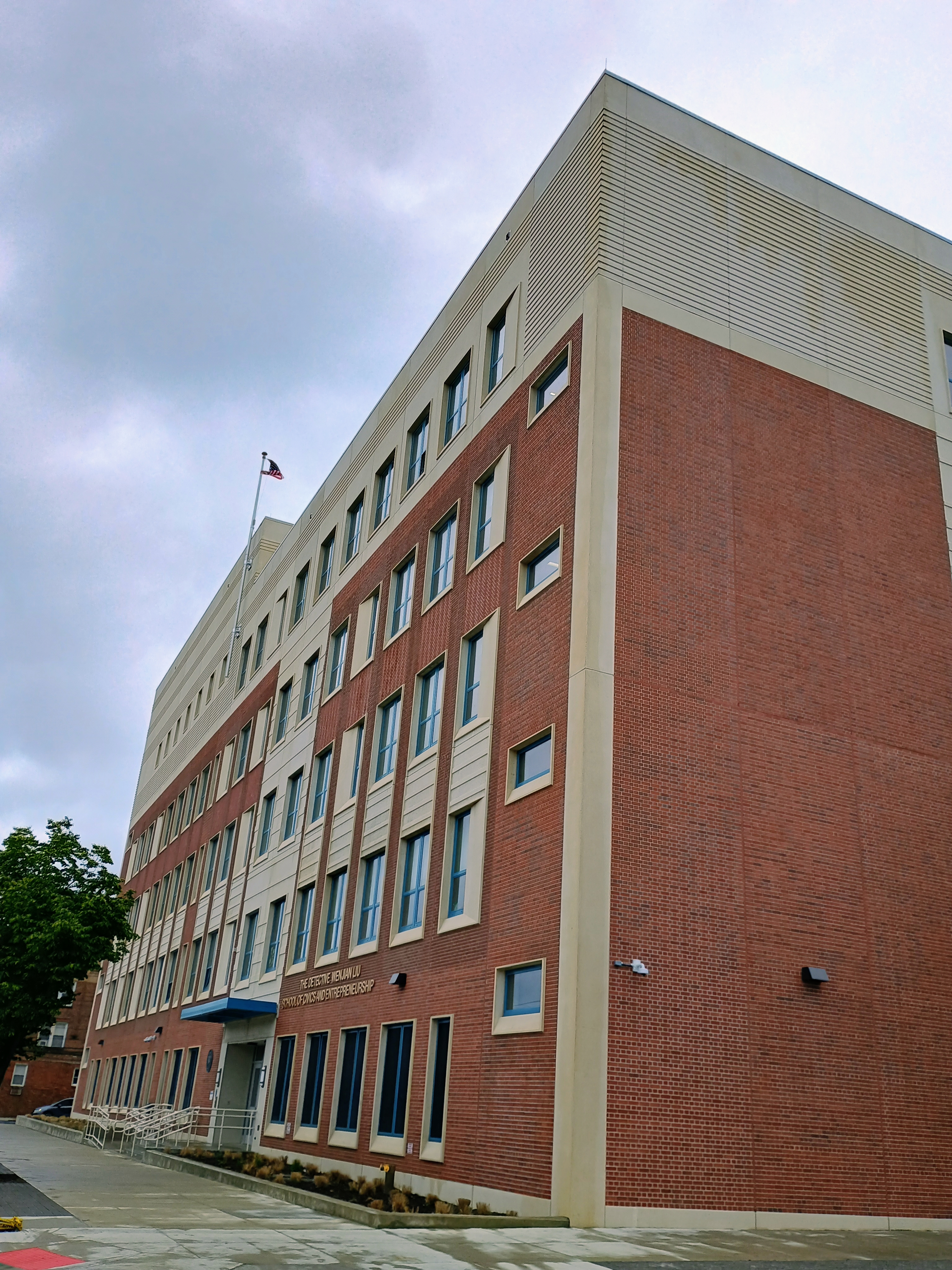
Brooklyn school named in honor of Detective Liu

In February 2015, a bill to co-name streets in honor of Liu and Ramos - each in the neighborhood within which they lived – was passed by the City Council and signed by de Blasio. Ceremonies to unveil Detective Wenjian Liu Way in Gravesend and Detective Rafael L. Ramos Way in Cypress Hills were held that June.

Ramos's widow, Maritza, created the Detective Rafael Ramos Foundation, whose goal is to improve relations between communities and law enforcement. Liu's widow, Sanny, created the Detective WenJian Liu Foundation, which trains therapy dogs to help first-responder families.

In May 2024, P.S. 331 in Dyker Heights was renamed to the Detective Wenjian Liu School of Civics and Entrepreneurship.

In September of that year, P.S. 54 in Bedford-Stuyvesant was renamed to the Detective Rafael Ramos School, a Magnet School of Environmental Science, Technology and Community Wellness. Also announced was that a police dog was named Ralfie in Ramos's honor.

== See also ==
- Shooting of Brian Moore
- Murder of Darren Goforth
- Shooting of Jesse Hartnett
- 2014 Las Vegas shootings
- 2016 shooting of Dallas police officers
- 2016 shooting of Baton Rouge police officers
- Murders of Alison Parker and Adam Ward
