= List of manifestos of mass killers =

This is a list of manifestos written by mass killers and attempted mass killers, explaining their motives for their actions.

== Analysis ==
The term "targeted violence manifesto" was coined by Julia Kupper and J. Reid Meloy to describe publications that are "intended to justify an act of violence against a specific target by articulating self-identified grievances, homicidal intentions, and/or extreme ideologies for committing an attack." They identified such publications as largely being written by a single creator prior to the attack, and that they often "express beliefs and ideas to violently promote political, religious, or social changes." Manifestos are often written to influence like-minded individuals to commit copycat attacks.

A 2017 analysis found the following themes in the manifestos of mass murderers: ego survival and revenge; pseudocommando mindset: persecution, obliteration; envy; nihilism; entitlement; and heroic revenge fantasy. Authors of terrorist manifestos, particularly ones that are "violent self-sacrificial" manifestos, often use language displaying identity fusion, where the identity as part of the group defines one's sense of self. The FBI conducted a study of 52 lone terrorists in 2019, which found that 96% produced either writings or videos intended to explain their beliefs to others; they found that in 88% of cases, perpetrators published their manifestos before the attack occurred, or "leakage," which is a valuable opportunity for intervention. Many manifestos contain calls for violence against the identified "out-group".

A 2023 analysis of the language typologies of lone actor manifestos divided the studied manifestos into three typologies: instigator, planner, and conspiracy, of which about 90% could be identified as belonging to one category.

- "Instigator" manifestos largely contained hateful language on a racial or religious basis; such manifestos feature prominent themes of revenge and often cite real world events as catalysts. These attackers, who tend to be younger, are likely to target places related to the group they are against, such as government or religious buildings, or educational facilities. Killers in this group tended to be younger. Examples of the authors of such manifestos include Michael Zehaf-Bibeau, Brenton Tarrant, and Charles Bishop.
- "Conspiracy" manifestos are written by perpetrators whose ideologies are based around and who believe in conspiracy theories. Such conspiracies can be personal or related to wider world events. Environmental conspiracies are especially prevalent in this category; attackers tend to target locations directly tied to the relevant conspiracy, and have a higher rate of explosive use. Examples of this category were given as Patrick Crusius, Ted Kaczynski, Lucas Helder, Anson Chi, and James Von Brunn.
- "Planner" manifestos are more focused on violence and the attack itself, with more focus on the specific details, explaining how the attack was conducted, and justifying it. Manifestos largely focused on preparations for the attack. Killers in this category were likely to identify themselves by their real name in their manifesto, which is an aspect that can aid crime investigators. Examples of this group were Elliot Rodger and Jim Adkisson.

== List ==
Name of manifesto	Author	Language	Date published	Notes	Length	Sources
Industrial Society and Its Future	Ted Kaczynski	English	19 September 1995	The manifesto was published in The Washington Post, after Kaczynski said he would end his bombing campaign if they did so. The manifesto contends that the Industrial Revolution began a harmful process of natural destruction brought about by technology, while forcing humans to adapt to machinery, creating a sociopolitical order that suppresses human freedom and potential. The 35,000-word manifesto formed the ideological foundation of Kaczynski's 1978–1995 mail bomb campaign, designed to protect wilderness by hastening the collapse of industrial society.	35,000 words (~100 pages)	
Communication From the Dead	Robert Flores	English	28 October 2002	Flores mailed a 22 page letter to the Arizona Daily Star, who later published it online, discussing his reasons for committing the shooting and giving a chronology of his life, stating that it was about "settling accounts". He then shot and killed three professors and himself at the University of Arizona School of Nursing. Two of his victims were named in the letter.	22 pages	
Unnamed	Seung-Hui Cho	English	16 April 2007	The manifesto was mailed to NBC News an hour and a half after Cho had first opened fire. Upon receiving the package on April 18, 2007, NBC News contacted authorities and made the controversial decision to publicize Cho's communications by releasing a small fraction of what it received. The manifesto was described as "rambling" and "incoherent", with Cho criticizing "rich brats" and referring to the perpetrators of the Columbine High School massacre as martyrs.	23 pages	
Natural Selector's Manifesto	Pekka-Eric Auvinen	English, Finnish	7 November 2007	Auvinen published a "media package" through RapidShare that he linked from his YouTube channel, containing 21 files including pictures of himself, his school, and guns, as well as several word files. The word files gave background on the attack, with Auvinen describing the attack as "political terrorism" and saying that he didn't want the attack to be called a "school shooting".	3 pages	
To Whom It May Concern	Jim Adkisson	English	27 July 2008	A four page manifesto found in his vehicle after the shooting attributed his motivation for the rampage as a hatred of liberals, Democrats, African Americans, and homosexuals.	4 pages	
2083: A European Declaration of Independence	Anders Behring Breivik	English	22 July 2011	Breivik wrote a manifesto running to 1,518 pages and is credited to "Andrew Berwick" (an Anglicization of Breivik's name). It was emailed to over 1000 email contacts less than an hour and a half before his bomb went off.	1,518 pages	
Manifest	Dmitry Vinogradov	Russian	7 November 2012	Posted on Vkontakte, expresses his hatred towards mankind, comparing humans to cancer.	2 pages	
Unnamed	Christopher Dorner	English	6 February 2013	The manifesto cites anti-police sentiment as a reason for killings.	11,000 words (~32 pages)	
Ragnarok	Alex Hribal	English	6 April 2014	Cites the Columbine shooters as inspiration and expresses moral nihilism.	4 pages	
My Twisted World: The Story of Elliot Rodger	Elliot Rodger	English	23 May 2014	Rodger emailed his 107,000-word manifesto to 34 people, including his therapist, Charles Sophy, his parents and other family, former teachers, and childhood friends.	107,000 words (~300 pages)	
rtf88	Dylann Roof	English	17 June 2015	The manifesto was posted on Roof's website, The Last Rhodesian, which also contained several photos of himself. Roof claimed in the manifesto that he had been radicalized after looking up "black on white crime" and was led to white supremacist websites. His manifesto was described by an expert on extremism as not belonging to the "mainstream" of white supremacist ideology.	2,444 words (~7 pages)	
My Manifesto	Christopher Harper-Mercer	English	1 October 2015	The manifesto, carried on a USB drive, was given to a UCC student in Snyder Hall. It was later released by investigators. In the manifesto, Harper-Mercer wrote his actions were done to serve Satan, who, according to Harper-Mercer, would "reward" murderers in hell by turning them into "gods". A large portion of the manifesto was devoted to describing Mercer's hatred of black men. He also described having "kinship" with various other mass and serial murderers, including Ted Bundy, the Columbine shooters, and the Sandy Hook School shooter.	6 pages	
The Great Replacement	Brenton Tarrant	English	15 March 2019	Tarrant wrote a 74-page manifesto, posted on 8chan and emailed to several politicians and newsrooms. It was titled The Great Replacement, a reference to the "Great Replacement" and "white genocide" conspiracy theories, which it largely focuses on, connecting it with elements of the Eurabia conspiracy theory. The manifesto has been noted to be less explicitly antisemitic than other white nationalist manifestos, instead blaming Muslims, but contains heavily antisemitic themes and euphemises Jews as "globalists"; Tarrant describes himself as a racist and fascist.	74 pages	
An Open Letter	John Earnest	English	27 April 2019	Earnest posted an anti-semitic and racist open letter on 8chan shortly before the shooting, and signed with his name. It was heavily focused on white genocide as an idea; the manifesto accused Jews of genociding the white race. He declared Tarrant his greatest inspiration, and takes credit for previously attempting to burn down a mosque.	9 pages	
The Inconvenient Truth	Patrick Crusius	English	3 August 2019	Crusius posted a manifesto to 8chan shortly before the shooting, explicitly inspired by Christchurch. The manifesto's posting resulted in the shutdown of 8chan.	2,300 words (~7 pages)	
Techno-Barbarism: A Spiritual Guide for Discontented White Men in the Current Year +4	Stephan Balliet	English	9 October 2019	The manifesto was published on the imageboard Meguca. Structured in a similar way as the Christchurch manifesto, it has a list of "Achievements" alluding to first-person shooter games and contains numerous anime references. It discusses the weapons he planned to use in detail, with comparatively less focus on ideological elements.	11 pages	
Unnamed	Mohammed Alshamrani	English	6 December 2019	Posted on Alshamrani's Twitter account, it condemned the United States as a "nation of evil" for their supposed crimes against Muslims and humanity.	4 pages	
Skript mit Bilder	Tobias Rathjen	English, German	19 February 2020	Rathjen uploaded three videos to his personal website, as well as a 24 page "script" in both English and German. In the manifesto, Rathjen adhered to far-right terror narratives, as well as elements of niche online conspiracies. He claimed a secret service organization had surveilled him since his birth and that he could observe events from a distance through the power of his mind.	24 pages	
A White Awakening	Nathaniel Veltman	English	6 June 2021	Inspired by the Christchurch terrorist's manifesto, the manifesto was found on a thumb drive inside of Veltman's residence.	74 pages	
manifest.txt	Hugo Jackson	English	19 August 2021	The manifesto was shared to users on the messaging app Discord by Jackson. He complains about Muslims immigrating into Sweden, liberal Swedish politicians and Black people. He also quotes the Christchurch mosques shooter and expresses his desire for people to join neo-nazi organizations, such as Atomwaffen Division.	658 words (~2 pages)	
Unnamed	Timur Bekmansurov	Russian	21 September 2021	Before the attack on Perm State University, Timur Bekmansurov posted a manifesto on his Vkontakte page, explaining the reasons for the attack, the preparations, and his thoughts.	~10 pages	
You Wait for a Signal While Your People Wait for You	Payton Gendron	English	12 May 2022	Titled after a quote from the Christchurch terrorist, the manifesto is focused on mass immigration and holds anti-Black views. The manifesto was originally posted on Google Docs two days before the attack and had not been modified since. The manifesto is largely plagiarized from The Great Replacement.	180 pages	
The Downward Spiral of "Ethan Miller"	Ethan Miller	English	28 August 2022	Posted on Wattpad, the manifesto describes his isolation and solitude as well as his inspiration by the Columbine High School massacre.	15 pages	
Unnamed	Artyom Kazantsev	Russian	22 September 2022	Before the attack, Artem sent a letter with a manifesto to School No. 70, hoping that it would be published by the Investigative Committee. Later, only two small fragments of the manifesto were posted and spread in the media.	~15 pages	
O pós modernismo e suas consequências na nossa nação, 'Post-modernism and Its Consequences for Our Nation'	I.S.C.	Portuguese	26 September 2022	A few hours before committing a shooting at the Barreiras school, the perpetrator published a manifesto on his Twitter account. In his manifesto, the perpetrator claimed to be superior to others, in addition to containing speeches in favor of racial supremacy and hate speeches against different communities such as the LGBT community, the residents of Bahia and the school community itself, in addition to stating that his intentions were to murder as many people as possible so that they "felt divine wrath".	29 pages	
A Call to Arms	Juraj Krajčík	English	12 October 2022	Just a few hours before the attack, links to a 65-page long manifesto were posted on Twitter. In the document, the author does not provide their name, claiming it is not of importance and "will be known later anyway", but identifies himself as a man of Slovak origin born on July 28, 2003, who has decided to "execute an operation" against "the enemies of the white race". The manifesto blames Jews and LGBT people for "causing harm to white people" and celebrates mass murderers, including Breivik and the perpetrators of Christchurch mosque shootings and Poway synagogue shooting.	65 pages	
Unnamed	Aiden Hale	English	27 March 2023	Hale's manifesto was not originally released to the public pending a lawsuit for their release, but on November 6, 2023, 3 pages were leaked online by Steven Crowder followed by the Nashville MPD opening an investigation. The leaked manifesto complained about those Hale considered to have white privilege. The leaked pages also included the plans for the shooting.	90 pages	
Unnamed	Connor Sturgeon	English	10 April 2023	Sturgeon's manifesto was detailed in a journal he kept, wherein he expressed frustration with the ease of access to firearms in the United States, intending for his shooting to bring about change in this regard. In addition, Sturgeon complained of corrupt politicians and a lack of action regarding mental health treatment.	13 pages	
A White Boy Summer to Remember	Ryan Palmeter	English	26 August 2023	Palmeter had three letters, two of which were not released to the public. One of them was released by the Jacksonville Sheriff's Office. It contains sentiments of racism against African Americans and anti-semitism. He cited the perpetrator of the Christchurch shootings as his primary inspiration.	26 pages	
Ölü Toplum, 'Dead Society'	Arda Küçükyetim	Turkish	12 August 2024	Arda had a manifesto which contained neo-Nazism, anti-Semitism, anti-Kurdish views and fantasies to attack left-wing government buildings. He cited many right-wing or anti-government mass murderers, describing them as saints, and depicted committing a mass murder satirically as if it were a first-person shooter video game.	17 pages	
War Against Humanity	Natalie Rupnow	English	16 December 2024	In her manifesto, Rupnow described extreme misanthropic and anti-social views, expressing intense hatred toward humanity and her parents. The manifesto detailed how she manipulated her father to gain access to a firearm. Parts of the manifesto focused on her planning process and were heavily inspired by toxic online subcultures and previous mass shooters.	6 pages	
Niggercell Manifesto	Solomon Henderson	English	22 January 2025	In his manifesto, Henderson described antisemitic and anti-Black views. The manifesto named various political inspirations, including political commentators Candace Owens and Destiny. Parts of the manifesto were plagiarized from other far-right publications and manifestos.	51 pages	
Мой гнев, 'My Wrath'	Timofey Kulyamov	Russian	16 December 2025	In his manifesto, Kulyamov described extreme misanthropic, xenophobic, and militant accelerationist views, expressing profound hatred toward society, which he referred to as "trash." The manifesto detailed his anger and planned violent actions. Parts of the manifesto focused on his radical ideological beliefs and were heavily inspired by transnational far-right online subcultures and previous mass attackers.	11 pages	
The Final Solution	Unnamed 13-year-old student	English		Before carrying out a school stabbing, a 13-year-old student published his short manifesto titled The Final Solution. In the manifesto, the phrase “no life matters” (a reference to the No Lives Matter group) appears. He also claimed “superiority” over his classmates, potentially linking him to incel ideology. In the manifesto, he also denied that his attack was a copycat crime or that he subscribed to any specific ideology.	"Short"	
Manifesto r su shi	İsa Aras Mersinli	English	15 April 2026	A portion of Mersinli's manifesto was leaked by their online boyfriend; in it, they described feeling isolated from society and their family, criticized the Turkish education system, and claimed to be "better than everyone" with an IQ of 130.	~4 pages	
The New Crusade	Cain Clark	English	18 May 2026	Clark's manifesto promoted white supremacist and neo-Nazi beliefs, expressed hatred toward Muslims and Jewish people, repeated racist conspiracy theories, praised previous mass killers, and argued that acts of terrorism should be used to accelerate societal collapse and inspire further violence.	33 Pages	
DEATH TO THE WORLD	Caleb Vazquez	English	18 May 2026	Vazquez's manifesto expressed white supremacist and neo-Nazi beliefs, promoted hatred toward Muslims, Jewish people, Black people, LGBTQ+ people, and women, praised previous mass killers, and claimed that violence was necessary to spark societal collapse and inspire future attacks.	38 Pages	
Unnamed	Seth Hatfield	English	22 June 2026	Hatfield's manifesto was found in his hotel room following the attack; in it, he called for the destruction of capitalism, which he claimed was responsible for the "hypergamy state" of women, by armed revolution. Among those listed as "valid class A targets" were business leaders (especially those in the porn industry), politicians, plastic surgeons, pickup artists, & Zionists.	104	
