= Murder of Darren Goforth =

2015 murder of a police officer in Houston, Texas

- Date: August 28, 2015
- Time: c. 8:20 p.m.
- Location: Houston, Texas, U.S.
- Target: Darren Goforth
- Participants: Shannon J. Miles
- Deaths: 1 (Darren Goforth)
- Suspects: Shannon J. Miles
- Charges: Capital murder

The murder of Darren Goforth refers to the shooting death of a ten-year deputy sheriff of the Harris County Sheriff's Office on August 28, 2015. Goforth, who was in uniform at the time, was killed by Shannon Miles, a man with an arrest record and a history of mental illness, who shot Goforth repeatedly in the back of the head with a .40 caliber handgun while Goforth was fueling his car. Miles's mother provided an alibi, but the police found the murder weapon in his garage, and he pleaded guilty to avoid the death penalty; he was sentenced to life imprisonment without the possibility of parole in September 2017.

The murder led to a scandal in the Harris County Sheriff's Department. The passenger in Goforth's car and witness to the murder was reportedly his mistress, who was also involved with two other officers. They were terminated, as was a third officer, who harassed the woman.

== Shooting ==
At approximately 8:30 p.m., Goforth pulled into a Chevron gas station at the intersection of West Road and Telge Road near Cypress, a town about 25 miles from downtown Houston. While he was filling up his car with gas, a black male in a red Ford Ranger walked up behind him and shot him repeatedly in the back of the head. The gunman fired fifteen shots, emptying his firearm and killing Goforth. The attack appeared to be unprovoked. The gun used to murder Goforth was described as a large handgun. Goforth was married to a woman named Kathleen, and he had two children, aged five and twelve at the time of his death at the age of 47.

== Shannon Miles ==
Shannon J. Miles was a native of Cypress, who lived about 0.5 miles (0.8 km) from the crime scene. Miles attended Prairie View A&M University from fall 2003 to spring 2004 and the University of Houston in 2011 or 2012. He had an arrest record dating back to 2005, consisting mostly of minor misdemeanor arrests, including resisting arrest, criminal mischief, trespassing, evading detention, and disorderly conduct with a firearm. Two of his arrests involved him using force against the arresting officers.

In 2012, Miles was charged with aggravated assault with a deadly weapon in connection to an incident in which he attacked a man at an Austin homeless shelter over control of a television remote. He was found mentally incompetent to stand trial and was sent to North Texas State Hospital for six months, after which a second evaluation found him to be mentally competent. However, the charge was dropped after authorities could not find the assault victim.

== Arrest and legal proceedings ==
The next morning, Miles was brought in for questioning as a person of interest after investigators linked his car to the one driven by the killer. He was arrested and charged with capital murder after a Smith & Wesson .40-caliber handgun discovered in a baseball bag in Miles's garage was confirmed through ballistics tests to be the same one used to kill Goforth. Several items were seized from the home by police, including clothes matching the ones said to be worn by the shooter and 34 rounds of ammunition. Authorities do not believe anyone else was involved in the killing.

The investigation was marred by police and judicial misconduct. Harris County Deputy Craig Clopton was fired on October 24, 2015, for inappropriate sexual misconduct toward a witness in the case; Presiding Judge Denise Collins recused herself for undisclosed reasons.

On February 10, 2016, the Harris County Sheriff's Office fired another deputy, Marc De Leon, involved in the investigation. Harris County Sheriff Ron Hickman said that De Leon was fired for being untruthful to investigators, but some Houston media outlets are reporting that De Leon also had a consensual sexual relationship with the witness. The Houston Chronicle reported on February 10 that a third HCSO deputy was also under investigation for having a sexual relationship with the same witness.

Miles was charged with capital murder and held without bond. On September 13, 2017, in order to avoid the death penalty, Miles pleaded guilty to murdering Goforth and was sentenced to life in prison without parole.

== Aftermath ==
=== Reactions ===
Texas Governor Greg Abbott declared in a statement that "heinous and deliberate crimes against law enforcement" would not be tolerated. Harris County district attorney Devon Anderson said she felt it was time for the silent majority to come out and support law enforcement. She also said, "There are a few bad apples in every profession, that does not mean that there should be open warfare declared on law enforcement." Harris County Sheriff Ron Hickman denounced the shooting as "senseless and cowardly" and stated that while investigators were not aware of a motive, it appeared that Goforth was targeted "because he wore a uniform."

The shooting drew comparisons to the shooting deaths of two officers with the New York City Police Department, which occurred the year before. The shooting also brought criticism of the Black Lives Matter movement, alleging that they were responsible for inspiring the attack. Hickman stated, "We've heard 'black lives matter.' All lives matter. Well, cops' lives matter, too. So why don't we just drop the qualifier and just say 'lives matter,' and take that to the bank."

Texas State Representative Garnet Coleman (D) criticized Hickman and Anderson for you "politicizing a death that, I don't know that anyone knows what was in the mind of the shooter." Activist DeRay Mckesson tweeted that it was "sad that some have chosen to politicize this tragedy by falsely attributing the officer's death to a movement seeking to end violence."

In the aftermath of the shooting, Republican presidential candidate Ted Cruz stated that U.S. President Barack Obama and officials in the Obama administration had partial moral responsibility for Goforth's death. Cruz blamed what he labeled as efforts to "vilify law enforcement" and stated that Obama had remained "silent" on the murder. Cruz's comments brought criticism from commentators in progressive publications such as Mother Jones and The Texas Observer, while conservative outlets such as Fox News expressed support for Cruz.

Despite the accusations of being "silent" on the murder, President Obama made an official statement to the family and Houston community.

=== Funeral service ===
On September 4, 2015, a funeral service for Goforth took place at the Second Baptist Church Houston. Thousands of mourners were in attendance, including police officers and other law enforcement personnel from various parts of the U.S. Flags in Texas were flown at half-staff.

=== Scandal in the Harris County Sheriff's Department ===
The investigation into Goforth's death soon revealed that Goforth, who was married, was with another woman at the time of the shooting. This woman said she was Goforth's mistress. Two other Harris County deputies involved in the investigation of Goforth's murder were found to be having romantic relationships with this woman, and they were terminated. A third deputy was terminated, though Goforth's mistress said this was after she reported that deputy for trying to force a relationship with her and for sending inappropriate text messages and emails.

=== Legacy ===
A year after Goforth's death, a county park in Northwest Houston was named in Goforth's memory.

== See also ==
- 2014 killings of NYPD officers
- Shooting of Jesse Hartnett
- 2016 shooting of Dallas police officers
- 2016 shooting of Baton Rouge police officers
- List of American police officers killed in the line of duty
