= The Age of Lone Wolf Terrorism =

2017 book about lone wolf terrorism

Age of Lone Wolf Terrorism
- Author: Mark Hamm; Ramon Spaaij
- Language: English
- Series: Studies in Transgression
- Subject: Terrorism
- Publisher: Columbia University Press
- ISBN: 978-0-231-18174-7
- Dewey Decimal: 363.325
- LC Class: HV6431.H3456 2017

The Age of Lone Wolf Terrorism is a 2017 book about lone wolf terrorism co-authored by Mark Hamm, a criminologist at Indiana State University and Ramon Spaaij, a sociologist at Victoria University, Australia. It is part of Columbia University Press's Studies in Transgression series.

== Contents ==
Hamm and Spaaij constructed a database funded by the United States Department of Justice in which they identified 124 instances of lone wolf terrorist attacks in the United States between 1940 and 2016; the list includes "about" 30 planned attacks that are known not to have been carried out, or that have been identified as FBI sting operations, or as hoaxes. Hamm and Spaaij use data they compiled, and examinations of the lone wolf phenomenon by other researchers to reach a series of conclusions.

Hamm and Spaaij defined lone wolf terrorism narrowly; they required an attacker to be politically motivated. This excluded, for example, mass shooters such as Adam Lanza, whose motive appeared to be entirely personal. Also, they had to have acted entirely alone, excluding cases like the 2015 San Bernardino attack carried out by a married couple, and the Boston Marathon bombing, carried out by a pair of brothers.

They conclude that lone wolf terrorist attacks are becoming more common in the United States, and that casualty tolls, both of injuries and of deaths, has risen steadily over the decades since 1940, and risen sharply in the 2010s. They note that the lone wolf terrorist who killed the highest number of victims was Joseph Paul Franklin who carried out a series of attacks in which he targeted black and Jewish Americans. They also show that in recent years lone wolves have more frequently targeted uniformed police and military personnel. Hamm and Spaaij single out FBI sting operations for special criticism.

They conclude that although as of 2018, white supremacist ideologies continue to account for the largest share of attacks, but that jihadist motivation has risen rapidly. They conclude that lone wolf terrorists are usually unemployed, single, white males with a criminal record who tend to be older, to have less education, and more likely to have a record of mental illness than other violent criminals. In particularly, they demonstrate that in recent years such recent attacks have followed incidents in which the lone wolf uses physical violence against women. Their data demonstrates that although explosives and guns were the most common weapons used by lone wolves from the 1940s through the 1980s, the use of guns has skyrocketed and they are now the weapon most commonly employed by lone wolf terrorists. They show that most lone wolves tell someone that they intend to carry out an attack. From the 1940s through the end of the century 84% of lone wolves did so, since 76% have done so.

== Reception ==
While overall calling the book meticulous and praising it as a valuable resource, James Mills criticizes Hamm and Spaaij for using narrow criteria that eliminate lone wolf pairs such as Rizwan Farook and Tashfeen Malik and the Tsarnaev brothers from inclusion on their list, even though they meet the definition in all other ways. Mills also criticized their argument that lone wolf terrorism is preventable since “violent radicalization is a social process involving behavior that can be observed, comprehended and modeled,” arguing that the influences on human action are complex and not easily modeled and predicted, while praising the author's data gathering. Book reviewer Kris Millett praises their "devastatingly effective" use of data to "argue that those captured in the sting operations did not display the personal characteristics common to the radicalisation of lone wolf terrorists."

Reviewer Joshua Sinai points out that lone wolves may regard themselves as members of terrorist organizations on the grounds that they are carrying out orders broadcast on the internet by the leaders of such organizations, and argues that, pace Hamm and Spaaij, FBI "sting" operations have been effective in preventing terrorism, but praises the author's six-part model (p. 159 in book) of personal and political grievance, affinity with online sympathizers or an extremist group, enabler, broadcasting intent, triggering event, and engaging in terrorism (p. 159).

According to a review in Times Higher Education that described The Age of Lone Wolf Terrorism as an "genuinely indispensable study of today's steadily increasing terrorist threat," the book's "pivotal contention" that the radicalization of lone wolf terrorists exhibits discernible patterns that include "the integration of personal and political grievances; an affinity with online sympathizers and/or extremist groups," and "triggering events that, oftentimes, cause a dramatic change in behavior".
