= Anson Chi =

American sovereign citizen

Anson Chi was born in New York City. He attended Plano Senior High School at Plano, Texas, and graduated in 1996. Chi was arrested for theft in 1998 in San Angelo, Texas.

Anson Chi has been identified as being part of the sovereign citizen movement. In 2007, Chi allegedly expressed support for tax protesters Edward and Elaine Brown. He posted a YouTube video stating that he would not file federal income tax returns or pay federal income tax.

In 2008, he self-published a novel, Yellow on the Outside, Shame on the Inside: Asian Culture Revealed. In the book, he disclosed frustrations with his parents and allegedly threatened to kill himself.

== Conviction for weapons violation ==
In 2008, he was sentenced to three years probation in Orange County, California on a weapons charge. According to the Associated Press, his three-year probation was revoked in 2009. Chi also faced a charge in Collin County, Texas, for allegedly failing to identify himself as a fugitive.

== The Plano, Texas natural gas pipeline bombing ==
On June 22, 2012, the Federal Bureau of Investigation (FBI) arrested Chi after a series of suspicious explosions near midnight on the night of June 17–18, 2012, near a gas pipeline in a residential area of Plano, Texas. Chi allegedly told police he had been hit by a car, but the police concluded that he was trying to tamper with a natural gas system and that a homemade bomb detonated in his possession. On June 25, 2012, the Dallas Morning News reported that during the investigation, law enforcement personnel found an explosive device in Chi's residence, and that a "bomb squad hauled a device out of the house, encased it in a protective steel container, buried it in a hole in Kaufman County and blew it up...." In connection with the incident, Chi was indicted by a Federal grand jury on a charge of possession of a destructive device in violation of the National Firearms Act; the indictment was filed on July 11, 2012 in the United States District Court for the Eastern District of Texas.

On March 4, 2013, the Court ruled that Chi was competent to stand trial.

In a superseding indictment handed down on February 14, 2013, Chi was charged with possession of an unregistered firearm in the form of an explosive, malicious use of explosive materials, and using or carrying a destructive device during a crime of violence.

On June 3, 2013, Chi pleaded guilty to a charge of attempting to destroy a natural gas pipeline used in interstate commerce, and to a charge of possessing an explosive device not registered with the National Firearms Registration and Transfer Record.

On February 26, 2014, the U.S. District Court for the Eastern District of Texas issued an order granting Chi's motion to withdraw his guilty plea. On May 14, 2014, a Second Superseding Indictment was filed against Chi in the case. He was charged with one count of knowingly possessing a destructive device not registered to him in the National Firearms Registration and Transfer Record, in violation of 26 U.S.C. § 5841, 26 U.S.C. § 5845, 26 U.S.C. § 5861, and 26 U.S.C. § 5871; one count of malicious use of an explosive, in violation of subsection (i) of 18 U.S.C. § 844; one count of using or carrying a destructive device during a crime of violence, in violation of subsection (c)(1)(B)(ii) of 18 U.S.C. § 924; and one count of making a false declaration before a court, in violation of 18 U.S.C. § 1623.

Eventually, Chi again pleaded guilty. On June 11, 2015, he was sentenced to twenty years in prison, based on a guilty plea to one count of possession of an unregistered firearm, and one count of malicious use of an explosive device. The sentence was ten years on the first count and twenty years on the latter count, but the two sentences were ordered to be served concurrently. Chi was also ordered to pay other amounts, including $28,127.77 in restitution to Atmos Energy in connection with the damage to the pipeline.

== Bankruptcy ==
On December 12, 2013, Chi filed for Chapter 7 Bankruptcy Protection in the United States Bankruptcy Court, Eastern District of Texas from the Collin County Detention Facility without the help of an attorney.

== Incarceration ==
As a result of his conviction for the Plano, Texas pipeline bombing, Anson Chi is now incarcerated at the Federal Correctional Institution, McKean at Lewis Run, Pennsylvania, and is projected to be released on March 27, 2030.
