= Shooting of Jesse Hartnett =

2016 shooting attack in Philadelphia

- Part of terrorism in the United States
- Date: January 7, 2016
- Time: c. 11:40 p.m. (EST)
- Location: 60th Street and Spruce Street, Philadelphia, Pennsylvania, U.S.; 39.957123°N 75.241889°W
- Participants: Jesse Hartnett, Edward Archer
- Injuries: 2 (Hartnett and the suspect)
- Convicted: Edward Archer
- Charges: Attempted murder; Aggravated assault on a police officer; Reckless endangerment; Making terroristic threats; Possession of an instrument of crime; Violation of uniform firearms act; Related offenses

In the late evening of January 7, 2016, in a sudden attack with no precipitating event, Edward Archer rushed towards and shot Philadelphia police officer Jesse Hartnett while he drove his patrol car, inserting the gun into the window of the car and firing at point blank range. Despite being shot multiple times in the left arm, Hartnett was able to exit his car and shoot the fleeing suspect. Later in the hospital, Archer claimed he pledged allegiance to ISIS. The Federal Bureau of Investigation (FBI) investigated the shooting as a terrorist attack.

The case is widely cited in scholarly work on lone wolf terrorism, as in example of an individual who carries out an act of terrorism without having had actual contact with terrorist groups or individuals.

Archer was convicted of the attempted murder of Officer Hartnett in January 2018. He was sentenced to between 48.5 and 97 years behind bars.

== Events ==
Uniformed police officer Jesse Hartnett was driving his marked Chevrolet Impala patrol car at about 11:40 p.m. at 60th Street and Spruce Street in West Philadelphia, when Archer, who had had no previous contact with the police on that particular evening, suddenly rushed toward the patrol car and fired 13 shots at Harnett, shoving his gun through the window to fire at point blank range. The attacker, who was wearing a white thawb (a robe generally worn by Muslim men), reportedly waved down the police car, then began firing as the car slowed down. He first fired through the driver's side window, then ran up to the car, reached through the shattered window, and continued firing directly at Hartnett, who shielded his head with his left arm. Altogether, Archer fired 13 bullets at Harnett at close range; 3 of the bullets hit the officer.

Hartnett, badly wounded and bleeding from three gunshot wounds to his left arm, nevertheless managed to stop the car, get out, and give chase. He was able to fire off three gunshots, shooting Archer in the buttocks before radioing for help. Archer was arrested a block away by other responding officers.

The 9mm Glock 17 that Archer used to shoot Officer Harnett was recovered at the scene; the pistol had been stolen from the home of a police officer in 2013.

After he was arrested, Archer told investigators, "I follow Allah," and, "I pledge allegiance to the Islamic State, and that's why I did what I did."

== Perpetrator ==
Edward Archer, aged 30, was unemployed and living with his mother at Yeadon, Pennsylvania, at the time of the shooting. He was allegedly armed with a 9mm Glock 17 handgun capable of carrying 13 rounds, which was reported stolen from the home of a police officer in October 2013; the gun was recovered shortly after the shooting in Archer's thawb. Archer confessed that he committed the attack "in the name of Islam", that Allah ordered him to commit the attack, and that he targeted a police officer because they defended laws that went against the teachings of the Quran.

Archer was said to have become interested in Islam during his teenage years. He was well known to Asim Abdur Rashid, imam of Masjid Mujahideen on south 60th Street in West Philadelphia, who knew him by his Muslim name, Abdul Shaheed. According to Imam Rashid, Archer had made the Haj to Mecca and had studied for perhaps six months in Egypt. He was described by local Muslims as devout, interested in the religion, and closely involved in the establishment of community activities.

According to an FBI official, Archer spent time in Saudi Arabia from October to November 2011 for Hajj (the Muslim pilgrimage to Mecca). He also traveled to Egypt for eight months in 2012 to study Arabic. According to acquaintances, Archer was the target of racist comments during his time in Egypt, which came to a point where he returned to the U.S. prematurely. The FBI began investigating both of the trips following the shooting, citing that Archer, who was unemployed and had no prior foreign travels, could not have been able to acquire a passport and pay for an extended stay in the Middle East; suspicions of the trips being funded by people or organizations with links to terrorism have been raised. It was later found that the trip was funded by a group of local Muslim men who would give donations to finance such trips for newcomers.

In March 2015, Archer pleaded guilty to a firearms offense, aggravated assault, and making terroristic threats, among other offenses, in relation to an incident that occurred in January 2012, in which he and two other men confronted the husband of Archer's ex-wife. He was sentenced to prison, but the sentence was reduced to time served and he was released and placed on probation. In November 2015, he had been found guilty of several charges that included fraud and forgery; he was out on probation and awaiting sentencing for that case at the time of the shooting.

According to Archer's mother, he suffered from head injuries from playing football and a moped accident. She also added that he had some form of mental illness, specifying that he would hear voices in his head. In addition, she claimed he felt targeted by police. A former classmate recalled that Archer was a loner in high school who had a passion for football and was not religious. Two associates stated that he had become more drastic and combative following his trips to the Middle East, though another said the trips seemed to have a calming effect on him.

=== Motivation of perpetrator ===
Discussion of whether this shooting was an instance of lone wolf terrorism inspired by Islamist propaganda, or was a crime committed by an individual suffering from some form of mental illness began immediately and have continued, provoked by Archer's claim, made shortly after he was arrested, that he shot the police officer in the name of Islam. In February 2016, Clive Watts, a homeland security expert, asserted that "This is headline-inspired, not ISIS-inspired. It tends to happen after a successful attack, like what happened in Paris. People who already have psychological issues pick up a weapon and decide to act. It's more personal than ideological."

A 2016 report by the Congressional Research Service included this shooting as one of a group of "Attacks in the United States 'Inspired' by the Islamic State."

In their 2017 book The Age of Lone Wolf Terrorism, Mark Hamm, a criminologist at Indiana State University and Ramon Spaaij, a sociologist at Victoria University, Australia, describe Archer as a lone wolf terrorist, a type of individual who, according to Hamm and Spaaij, are usually unemployed, single, white males with a criminal record who tend to be older, and who are likely to have less education, and also more likely to have a record of mental illness, than other violent criminals. Hamm and Spaaij define lone wolf terrorists as attackers who are politically motivated and have acted entirely alone.

The authors of an article in the CTC Sentinel entitled "Is There a Nexus Between Terrorist Involvement and Mental Health in the Age of the Islamic State?" discuss this shooting as a case in which "mental health problems were alluded to by non-experts (often family, friends, neighbors) but latched onto by the wider media as concrete evidence of a disorder’s presence (and presumably direct role in the violent intent/actions)." They conclude that media reports about Archer's mental health problems show "disturbingly low levels of evidence," that Archer suffered from "a mental disorder."

In his book Unholy Alliance: The Agenda Iran, Russia, and Jihadists Share for Conquering the World, First Amendment attorney Jay Sekulow places Archer in a group of "Muslims (who) choose to bring Islam to the West through violent acts of jihadist terrorism." By contrast, in their book Countering Terrorism, political science professor Martha Crenshaw and criminology professor Gary LaFree argue that despite Archer's "claim(s) to be acting in the name of Allah and ISIS," his "motives were obscure."

Philadelphia Mayor Jim Kenney condemned the shooting, but asserted that, "In no way, shape or form does anybody in this room believe that Islam or the teaching of Islam" have anything to do with the shooting, a statement for which he was taken to task by Dorothy Rabinowitz, who accused the Mayor of making an assertion that was "bizarre in their determined denial of the deluge of facts delivered by top police officials standing next to him," at the press conference held shortly after the attack. Kenny's statement was also harshly criticized by political commentator Dana Loesch in her book Flyover Nation: You Can't Run a Country You've Never Been To. In Loesch's opinion, the shooter ought to have still been serving his 10-year sentence for a 2012 conviction on felony gun possession (his sentence has been reduced.) Loesch characterizes such early releases of convicted criminals as "a deadly judicial pattern." General Michael Flynn called Mayor Kenny's statement, "absurd."

Amara Chaudhry Kravitz of Upon Further Review (a journal published by the Philadelphia Bar Association,) criticized the Philadelphia District Attorney's prosecution of Archer and argued that Archer can, and should, be prosecuted pursuant to Pennsylvania's criminal terrorist statute, 18 Pa.C.S.A. 2717, based upon facts known to investigators at this time. She also argued that such a prosecution would double the maximum statutory sentence Archer could receive in state court and, at the same time, would not preclude a subsequent federal prosecution if investigators were to find sufficient facts to justify a federal terrorism prosecution. Fellow Upon Further Review writer Susan Lin responded critically to Kravitz's article, citing Archer's apparent mental health issues.

== Officer Hartnett ==
Officer Jesse James Hartnett, aged 33, was at the time a four-year veteran with the Philadelphia Police Department. He graduated from Monsignor Bonner High School in 2001. Hartnett previously served with the United States Coast Guard, joining right after the September 11 attacks occurred and serving on active duty throughout August 2008. He then served with the Coast Guard Reserve from 2009 to November 2015. In September 2010, he became an officer for the East Lansdowne police force and worked there until July 2011, which was when he transferred to the Philadelphia Police Department.

Hartnett was struck by 3 bullets, suffering a broken arm and nerve damage. He was classified as being in critical but stable condition, and went into surgery at Penn Presbyterian Medical Center. He was wearing a bulletproof vest at the time of the shooting. An online fundraising campaign was set up on January 9 to aid Hartnett in recovering from his injuries, Hartnett was discharged from the hospital on January 22. but reparative surgery and recuperation were still ongoing a year later.

On April 11, 2016, Hartnett was honored by the Philadelphia Phillies by being invited to throw the opening pitch, and also permitted to propose marriage to his girlfriend on the ballfield. He was given the Sgt. Robert Wilson III Valor Award by the Philadelphia Police Department.

== Legal proceedings ==
Archer was taken into custody immediately after the shooting.

=== Criminal investigation ===
Immediately after the shooting, the FBI searched two residences connected to the suspect. They also began scouring through the suspect's online activities and phone records.

On January 10, three days after the shooting, an unidentified woman stopped a police officer on a street and informed him that the suspect was "part of a [radical] group that consists of three others", that he "is not the most radical of the four", and that "the threat to police is not over". The tipster also informed the officer that the other three men frequented the area where Hartnett was shot and claimed to have an affiliation with the group. As a result, all law enforcement agencies in Philadelphia were put on high alert, officers were ordered to work in pairs, and an investigation into the tip by a federal and local Joint Terrorism Task Force was launched. Investigators are aware of the names of two of the three men in question, but are still seeking the identity of the third.

On January 13, six days after the shooting, FBI Director James Comey announced that the FBI was investigating the shooting as a terrorist attack. The next day, Comey announced that the FBI at the time had not found any evidence that Archer was involved with any terrorist cells or that there were any other planned attacks in Philadelphia. He also downplayed the significance of the January 10 tip.

=== Arraignment and trial ===
On January 9, Archer was arraigned on one count of attempted murder, along with charges of aggravated assault on a police officer, reckless endangerment, making terroristic threats, possessing an instrument of crime, violating a uniform firearms act, and related offenses. He was held without bail. A preliminary hearing was scheduled for January 25. This hearing was postponed to March 10 and scheduled to be held in Philadelphia Municipal Court.

Archer appeared in court at the March 10 preliminary hearing, which was attended by several police officers. Hartnett testified at the hearing, describing the details of his attack and the aftermath. Municipal Court Judge Marsha H. Neifield ordered Archer to be held "on all charges, including attempted murder and aggravated assault, assaulting a law enforcement officer, several gun counts, and receiving stolen property" referring to the stolen pistol used in the shooting.

He was formally arraigned in Common Pleas Court on March 31, 2016.

On December 18, 2017, an attempt by Archer's attorney to persuade the court that Archer was mentally unfit to stand trial failed when the court ruled that Archer was mentally competent to stand trial.

The trial was scheduled to begin on Monday, January 22, 2018.

A video of Archer was shown at the trial, in which he states that “I did what I did because I pledge my allegiance to the Islamic State.” In the video, he continues speaking asserting that police officers enforce a law that is not Allah's law and stating that he will fight against disbelievers. When the judge asked Archer whether he wished to testify, he responded only by saying, “Speak to Allah.”

=== Conviction and sentencing ===
Archer was convicted of attempted murder and aggravated assault on February 1, 2018. He was sentenced to the maximum term available to the court for this crime, between 48.5 and 97 years behind bars.

== Context ==
In their 2017 book The Age of Lone Wolf Terrorism, Mark Hamm and Ramon Spaaij regard this shooting as part of a 21st-century pattern of "targeting uniformed police and military personnel" by lone wolf terrorists. Writing in the journal CTC Sentinel, Sam Mullins describes this shooting as an instance of "jihadist-inspired violence," noting that such attacks may be carried out not only by individuals "directed and funded by foreign terrorist organizations" and by "autonomous groups and individuals who are often lacking substantial overseas connections but nevertheless share the same murderous ideology," but also by "troubled individuals who seem to be driven at least as much by mental illness as by exposure to jihadi propaganda or related media coverage."

Writing in the Journal of Strategic Security, Martin J. Gallagher, describes this crime and Archer's assertion of motivation as one of a series of "known lone wolf terrorist attacks in 2016." Gallagher, a British police official charged with the investigation of and response to serious crime national crisis events, discusses the "wave" of which this shooting is part as "a tsunami of attacks perpetrated by individuals" who fit the definition of lone wolf terrorist offered by Michael Becker in his 2014 paper, Explaining Lone Wolf Target Selection in the United States. Gallagher asserts that "there must be an unequivocal acceptance that mental health is a factor in lone wolf terrorism, and that the actions of those who are ill need to be seen as those of a terrorist when appropriate.

The Wall Street Journal placed this shooting in the context of a series of ISIS-inspired lone wolf incidents in the United States, including the 2015 San Bernardino attack, pointing out that some 60 individuals were arrested in 2015 in the United States charged with giving support to ISIS; the Journal quoted Michael Nacht, a former official with the U.S. Defense Department, now a Professor at the University of California, Berkeley's Goldman School of Public Policy, who stated that calling on Muslims worldwide to attack non-Muslims is "a very effective ISIS strategy."

The case was revisited by the press in December 2017 when an immigrant from Egypt who was a naturalized citizen of the United States, Ahmed El-Mofty, opened fire on police just outside the Pennsylvania State Capitol Building in Harrisburg, Pennsylvania. The Harrisburg attacker was shot and killed, but the incident sparked a debate about his motivation that was compared with the debate over Archer's motive.

== Impact ==
In light of this attack, and a similar attack on French police that occurred earlier on the same day, officers of the New York City Police Department were instructed to "exercise heightened vigilance" and take "proactive measures". A SWAT unit and two units assigned to the Philadelphia Police Department's counter-terrorism unit were added to the police patrols in recent days.

On January 12, five days after the shooting, a march was held in Philadelphia in support for Hartnett and other police officers.

== Reactions ==
Police Commissioner Richard Ross denounced the shooting as "absolutely evil". He also commended Officer Hartnett's survival, which he called "absolutely amazing". Governor Tom Wolf said in a statement, "This alleged intentional act of violence against an officer seeking to help a fellow citizen is horrifying and has no place in Pennsylvania." Pennsylvania Senators Pat Toomey and Bob Casey, Jr. both decried the shooting, with Toomey calling it an act of terror. Republican U.S. presidential candidates Jeb Bush and Marco Rubio also reacted to the shooting.

== See also ==
- 2014 shootings at Parliament Hill, Ottawa
- 2014 Tours police station stabbing
- 2014 Queens hatchet attack
- January 2016 Paris police station attack
