= Lone wolf terrorism =

Self-planned terrorism

Lone wolf terrorism, or lone actor terrorism, is a type of terrorism committed by an individual who both plans and commits the act on their own. The precise definition of the term varies, and some definitions include those directed by larger organizations and small cells. Other names for the phenomenon include lone operator terrorism, freelance terrorism, solo terrorists, and individual terror cells. It is similar to but distinct from the concept of leaderless resistance.

The name 'lone wolf' is derived from the notion of a lone wolf, an animal that has left or been excluded from its pack. The term was popularized in the late 1990s by white supremacist activists Tom Metzger and Alex Curtis, and further from the FBI and the San Diego Police Department's investigation into Curtis, named Operation Lone Wolf. Compared to the general population and members of organized terrorist groups, lone wolf terrorists are more likely to have been diagnosed with a mental illness, though it is not an accurate profiler.

== Definition and terminology ==
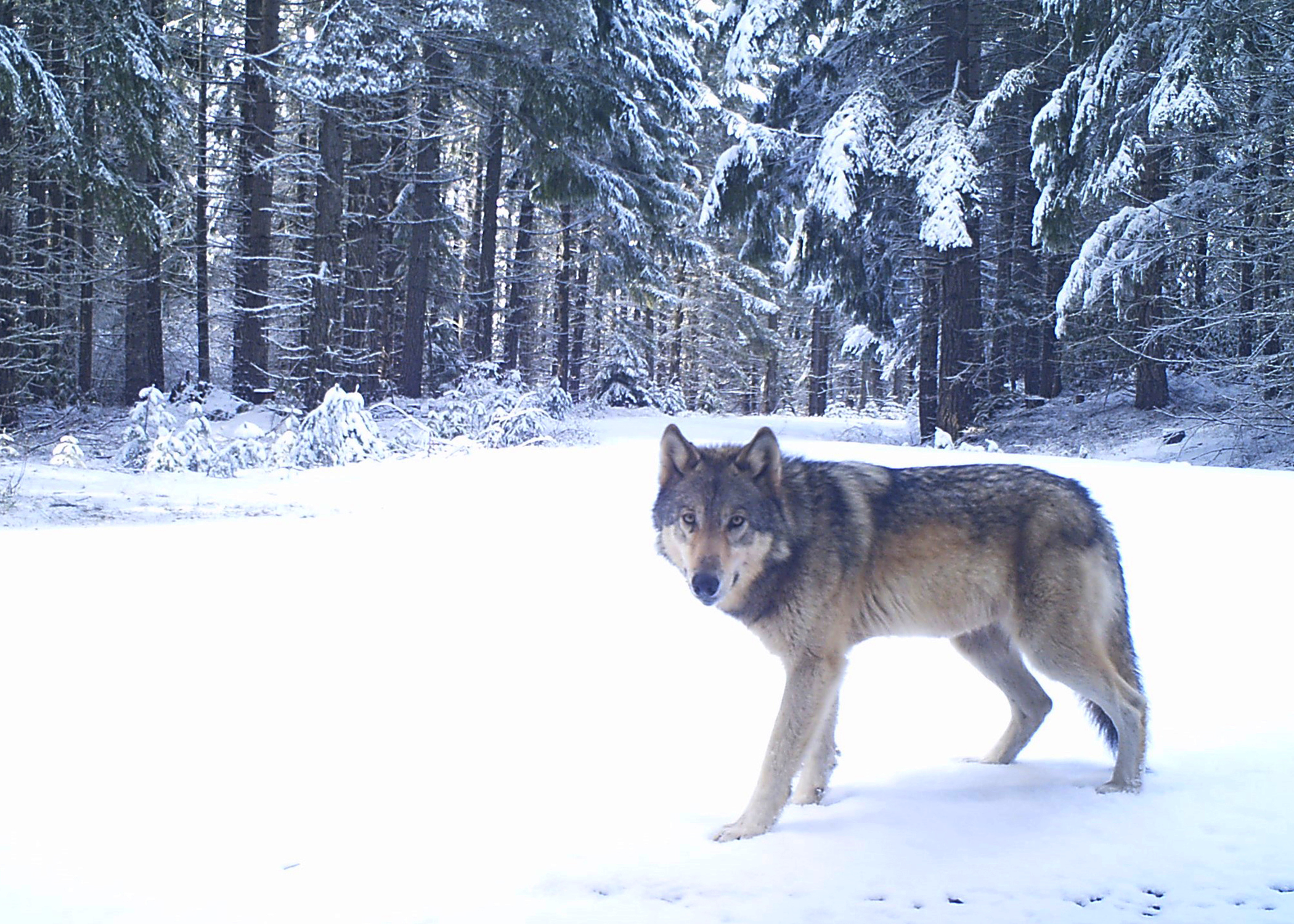
A lone wolf

While there is no universally accepted definition, a lone wolf terrorist is usually defined as a terrorist who operates on their own without outside help. Many of the definitions vary about key aspects, causing definitional problems and issues in comparative study, compounded by terminology issues. Other equivalent terms, mostly used interchangeably, include lone operator terrorism, freelancers, freelance terrorism, solo terrorists, solo actors, solitary, lone offenders, lone avengers, and individual terror cells, among others.

Other definitions include terrorists who operated solely on their own, but also those who committed an act themselves while being directed by a larger organization, groups of two and small cells. Researcher Christopher Hewitt argued that a terrorist group could only be defined at four or more people, and that if a group was made up of three or fewer members they were still lone wolves, while Paul Gill argued that dyads would qualify. Other scholars criticized this as an "oxymoron" and as negating the entire concept. It is not a legal term or a social science concept; some researchers have argued that the term is constructed by the actors themselves as well as the media, and argue the general concept of lone wolf terrorism is not useful. Furthermore, the distinction of non-ideologically motivated crimes including other spree killings versus terror act can often be difficult to define, and some individuals who were called lone wolf terrorists were found to have acted without ideological motivation. Terrorism itself is difficult to define for similar reasons.

A similar and related but distinct concept is leaderless resistance, also used by terrorists. The descriptor 'lone wolf' is derived from the notion of a lone wolf, a pack animal that has left or been excluded from its pack. The term "lone wolf" was popularized in the late 1990s by white supremacists Alex Curtis and Tom Metzger. The "lone wolf" descriptor is itself controversial even beyond the issue of definition, as some researchers view it as glorifying or glamorizing terrorism, "[giving] the attacker too much credit for cunning and guile". "Lone actor" is often used as an alternative term due to this, and has become popular in academic writings. The United Nations Counter-Terrorism Committee Executive Directorate instead uses "terrorists acting alone". Terrorism researcher Jeffrey Kaplan argued against this, saying "that their attacks succeed is proof enough that they do not lack either cunning or guile." In academic writing, the term "lone wolf" in reference to terrorism was possibly first used in Kaplan's 1997 article "Leaderless Resistance" in Terrorism and Political Violence.

== Motives and considerations ==
Lone actor terrorists are ideologically driven, with political or religious motives, and are intended to create fear and influence public opinion. Lone wolf terrorists may sympathize with and consider themselves part of larger groups, but they are usually not active participants. The links between lone wolves and actual terrorist groups tend to be informal and conducted online.

Compared to the general population, lone wolf terrorists are significantly more likely to have been diagnosed with a mental illness, although it is not an accurate profiler. Studies have found that roughly a third of lone wolf terrorists have been diagnosed at some point in their life with a mental illness. This puts lone wolves as being 13.5 times more likely to suffer from a mental illness than a member of an organized terrorist group, such as al-Qaeda or ISIS. Environmental factors such as relationships with those belonging to a terrorist group, social isolation, and various stressors mediate the relationship between mental illness and lone wolf terrorism. Mental health challenges are thought to make some individuals among the many who suffer from certain "psychological disturbances", vulnerable to being inspired by extremist ideologies to commit acts of lone wolf terrorism. An alternative explanation is that terrorist groups reject those with mental illnesses as they pose a security risk, creating a selection bias.

Lone wolf attacks are rarely committed solely without help by genuine loners. A 2011 typology based on an analysis of lone wolf operations by Raffaello Pantucci defined four categories of lone wolf: Loner, Lone Wolf, Lone Wolf Pack, and Lone Attacker. As defined in his typology:

- The true Loner type is an actor who conducts the operations solely in isolation with no outside influence. Kaplan noted these attackers as existing in a "definitional gray area", using the murderer Joseph Paul Franklin as an example, saying of Franklin that it was difficult to determine whether he was a lone wolf terrorist, a serial killer, or "an individual so deranged that he was expelled from the American Nazi Party for behavior too bizarre even for their decidedly peculiar standards"; he argued that in the age of the internet it was difficult for there to be any true loners, as "no one is too weird to be without compatriots thanks to the internet."
- The Lone Wolf type is the most common, ultimately acting alone but possibly within a supportive social environment for their attack. This was the method used by many pro-life terrorists, who if they decided to take violent action, would immediately end contact with the wider movement.
- The Wolf Pack is similar to the Lone Wolf, but involves a smaller group of people acting relatively autonomously. Kaplan disputed this as constituting lone wolf terrorism; Kaplan argued this was better described as a kind of autonomous cell system, though said it was useful in categorizing the Oklahoma City bombing planned by Timothy McVeigh with the assistance of Terry Nichols, as well as similar cases, as lone wolf terror acts.
- The Lone Attacker is an actor who acts alone, but is still somewhat controlled and tied to an organization. This type of attacker is common in Islamist terror acts, but is very rare in radical right terror as they lack similar organizational structures. However, the Atomwaffen Division was a radical right group who orchestrated attacks in this manner.

In many cases, such as with Alex Curtis, the lone wolf never has personal contact with the group they identify with. As such, it is considerably more difficult for counter-terrorism officials to gather intelligence on lone wolves, since they may not come into contact with routine counter-terrorist surveillance. In the United States, lone wolves may present a greater threat than organized groups. Some groups actively advocate lone wolf actions. In news analysis of the Boston Marathon bombing, the Al-Qaeda activist Samir Khan, publishing in Inspire, advocated individual terrorist actions directed at Americans and published detailed recipes online.

== History ==
Historian Richard Jenson says the years 1878–1934 were the era of anarchist terrorism and should be considered the classic age of "lone wolf" or leaderless terrorism. Anarchists rejected authoritarian, centralized control over acts of planned violence as well as over anything else. Jenson says there were hundreds of violent anarchist incidents during this period most of which were committed by lone individuals or very small groups without command structures or leaders. Since 1940, there have been around 100 successful lone wolf attacks in the United States.

=== 20th century ===
Most 20th century lone wolf attacks were ineffective and did not have a large impact. In its widespread usage in the far-right, it emerged in a period of trouble for the American movement. The movement was scattered between several smaller groups in the 1980s; in the 1960s they had been relatively centralized in the American Nazi Party led by George Lincoln Rockwell. An early case was Joseph Tommasi of the National Socialist Liberation Front who argued that, since the public would never become a revolutionary force, they could only have an impact if individuals took up arms; several members of his group did as he suggested, but there was little impact except jail sentences for the perpetrators.

In contrast to the European far-right, which was largely a law enforcement issue and not much of a threat to the state (though there were one off cases of far-right lone wolves in Europe, e.g. Swedish serial killer John Ausonius), the American far-right had immense amounts of weaponry at its disposal. Many of these far-right groups became explicitly revolutionary: The Covenant, the Sword, and the Arm of the Lord at one point issued a declaration of war on the US government, while The Order embarked on a string of murders and robberies. Joseph Paul Franklin, a racist serial killer who was expelled from the American Nazi Party, became an early lone wolf killer, killing several people over a period of two decades; however, he never attributed his crimes to an ideology while committing them, so his crimes had no actual terrorist impact until after he was caught.

The US government, made aware of the danger of such groups due to the actions of the Order, cracked down on many far-right organizations. After the Waco siege, the Ruby Ridge standoff, and several other instances the far-right became even more paranoid, and civil suits filed by groups like the Southern Poverty Law Center (SPLC) eliminated or affected many of the groups. Other groups were infiltrated, by both government agents and organizations like the Anti-Defamation League. This led to distrust and discontent spreading among these movements. As a result of these organizational problems, white supremacist Louis Beam promoted the similar tactic and his particular conception of leaderless resistance, in an essay titled "Leaderless Resistance", where he argued that due to the government persecution of organized movements a solution could be found in "non-organization".

=== Origin of the term ===
Towards the end of the 20th century, the leaderless resistance concept would morph into the lone wolf idea. The popularization of the term "lone wolf" in reference to terrorism probably began in the 1990s among the white supremacist movement. "Lone wolf" as a term in reference to this concept was effectively coined by white supremacists Alex Curtis and Tom Metzger in the 1990s; both encouraged other white racists to commit crimes for tactical reasons. Metzger was the leader of the White Aryan Resistance, one of the groups affected by the civil suits by the SPLC, while Curtis, one of the far-right's earliest popular figures online, was the operator of a magazine called the Nationalist Observer out of San Diego.

Unlike Beam's leaderless resistance concept, which allowed for small cells as part of the model, Metzger and Curtis preferred lone actors. George Michael noted Curtis as then being the "most vociferous" promoter of the lone wolf approach. Curtis argued against formal group membership and meetings, given the easy infiltration of them and the ability of others to file legal action against dissident groups; "lone wolf" action would avoid incriminating the group. He promoted a two tiered system, with a propaganda wing to encourage the lone wolves alongside the actors themselves. Curtis's rhetoric brought him to the attention of authorities, and he became the subject of a two-year FBI and San Diego Police Department investigation in 1998, called Operation Lone Wolf. As a result of the FBI investigation's name, the "lone wolf" terminology became established in referring to lone wolf terrorism.

=== Spread ===
Lone wolf attacks became more prominent in the 21st century. While initially popular among white supremacists, the method was used increasingly among Islamic militant movements in the early 2000s, partially through example in other attacks and later through promotion by the Islamic State. Jewish extremists also used the strategy, e.g. Yigal Amir who assassinated Prime Minister of Israel Yitzhak Rabin.

A 2013 analysis by Sarah Teich, a research assistant at the International Institute for Counter-Terrorism, found five emerging trends in Islamist lone wolf terrorism in North America and western Europe between 1990 and 2013:

- An increase in the number of countries targeted by lone wolves from the 1990s to the 2000s.
- An increase in the number of people injured and killed by lone wolves.
- Increased effectiveness of law enforcement and counter-terrorism.
- Consistency in the distribution of attacks by "actor types" (loners, lone wolves, and lone wolf packs).
- An increase in the number of attacks against military personnel.

== Stochastic terrorism ==
Stochastic terrorism refers to political or media figures publicly demonizing a person or group, inspiring their supporters to commit a violent act against the target of the speech. Unlike incitement to terrorism, this is done using indirect, vague or coded language, which allows the instigator to plausibly disclaim responsibility for the resulting violence. Global trends point to increasing violent rhetoric and political violence, including more evidence of stochastic terrorism. It is in this manner that the stochastic terrorist is thought to randomly incite individuals predisposed to acts of violence. Because stochastic terrorists do not target and incite individual perpetrators of terror with their message, the perpetrator may be labeled a lone wolf by law enforcement, while the inciters avoid legal culpability and public scrutiny. In their 2017 book The Age of Lone Wolf Terrorism, criminologist Mark S. Hamm and sociologist Ramón Spaaij discuss stochastic terrorism as a form of "indirect enabling" of terrorists. They write that "stochastic terrorism is the method of international recruitment used by ISIS", and they refer to Anwar al-Awlaki and Alex Jones as stochastic terrorists.

== See also ==
- List of lone wolf terrorist attacks
- List of manifestos of mass killers
- Radicalization
- Mens rea
