= Farhat Hashmi =

Pakistani Canadian Islamic scholar

Personal life
- Born: Farhat Hashmi; December 22, 1957 (age 68) Sargodha, Punjab, Pakistan
- Occupation: Islamic scholar

Religious life
- Religion: Islam

Farhat Hashmi (Urdu: فرحت ہاشمی; born December 22, 1957) is a Pakistani-Canadian Islamic scholar and preacher. She is the founder of the Al-Huda Institute, a network of Islamic religious schools for women.

She holds a PhD degree in Islamic studies from the University of Glasgow, Scotland and was formerly a lecturer and assistant professor at the Faculty of Usul-al-Din at International Islamic University, Islamabad. Hashmi founded Al-Huda International Welfare Foundation in 1994. The foundation started a number of schools to teach the Quran and Hadith to women in order to "help women become better observant Muslims by helping them understand the Quran". The foundation now runs a network of schools, seminaries and social welfare projects. In 2004, the foundation established the Al-Huda Institute in Mississauga (Toronto area), Ontario, Canada. This institute offers courses on exegesis of the Quran and Hadith and attracts students from a number of foreign countries such as Australia.

She has gained popularity as a female scholar both in Pakistan and abroad, as evidenced by crowds of up to ten thousand that attend her religious lessons, called dars : the number of women who got a diploma or certificate are estimated to be around 15,000 while those who followed her courses without formally enrolling are even more numerous. Most followers come from liberal, literate and modern backgrounds; and most are women. She has stated that her mission is to bring a renewal in Islam, through better understanding of the core scriptures. In contrast to rigid and confrontational styles of proselytising, Hashmi has emphasized the need for her students to engage in voluntarily educating others through their examples.

== Early life and education ==
Farhat Hashmi was born in Sargodha, Punjab, on December 22, 1957. Her father, Abdur Rehman Hashmi, was a Muslim scholar, and the local leader of the Jamaat-e-Islami Pakistan. She was educated at a local school; then studied at the Government College for women Sargodha and ultimately completed her Master's degree in Arabic Language from the University of Punjab, Lahore. Her religious education occurred at her home where she was taught the tenets of Islam by her father. She married a fellow scholar of Hadith Muhammad Idrees Zubair and the couple took up posts of lecturers at the International Islamic University (IIU), Islamabad. Soon after they moved to Scotland where they enrolled in the doctorate programme of Islamic studies. During this time, they both travelled to Turkey, Jordan, Syria, Egypt and Saudi Arabia.

She emigrated to Canada in 2005.

== Career ==
While teaching at the International Islamic University, Hashmi had started informal religious classes for women. Upon returning to Pakistan she launched Al-Huda International; a non-government welfare trust which seeks to educate women as to how they can interpret and then employ Islamic principles in their daily lives. The establishment of a progressive school purely for women, by a female Islamic scholar was seen by some as a direct response to large seminaries, which women had come to view as being regressive and highly politicised. Hashmi has been noted for her nontraditional style of teaching and original lectures which focus on feminism. She utilizes modern methods of teaching in her lectures and is multilingual in Urdu, Arabic and English, so her female students; a large of whom come from educated, urban families, are able to relate with her. Academic studies have shown that the innovative techniques of teaching introduced by Hashmi are one of the reasons for the institute's popularity.

Hashmi began her career as a television preacher on Geo TV, where she hosted the programme Shahru Ramadan during the month of Ramadhan. She also appeared in the programme The Quran & You on Aag TV. She continued to give lectures on exegesis of the Quran on Geo in the show Fahm ul Quran. More recently her lectures have been broadcast as standalone episodes. During her television shows, she appears on air covered with an Islamic veil and niqab; while giving her lectures from her laptop. This has been termed as an "image that projects the confluence of pious traditionalism and media savvy prosperity".

== Views ==
She favours greater participation of women in day-to-day matters of faith, and is of the view that women should be able to pray outside their homes, and they should be able to lead their own prayers. According to Hashmi, women can touch and recite the Quran during their menstrual periods, wearing gloves (either when learning Quran from a teacher or teaching Quran to others), traditionally considered by some to be prohibited.

Hashmi advocates for a revival of Islam and encourages her followers to interpret the Qur'an for themselves supporting their views with strong evidence. She urges her followers to focus on becoming better Muslims and her lectures are focused on family structures. This view is criticized by her critics, who claim that her religious Dars "center around personal and family development, rather than community service". Hashmi, however, argues that if all of her students undergo a transformation for the better, their personal transformation will be reflected on a national and a global scale.

Hashmi is in favour of establishing the Sharia Law in Canada. Her views on domestic matters are in accordance with her interpretation of the Sharia Law. According to Hashmi, both men and women have specific spheres of influence within the society. Typically men are the ones who work outside the house, while women work within. However, Hashmi argues that these roles are not set in stone and if a person has fulfilled his or her role, they can help the other in their duties as well. This, and her other arguments which call for women to work outside the roles that have been designated to them by rigid traditionalist scholars, have drawn considerable ire from conservative, right wing scholars. Hashmi considers polygamy to be legal, and has encouraged Muslim women to let their husbands marry a second time as this benefits them religiously and saves men from having a nonmarital relationship, which is forbidden according to the Quran.

== Criticism ==
Hashmi has been criticised by some Islamic clerics who believe that a woman cannot become an Islamic scholar and interpreter of Quran.

She also has been criticized by some ultra-conservative, right-wing preachers and puritan men for breaking gender roles in Islam, especially on her views about women teaching and preaching outside the home. Other conservative sources have criticized her students of "wearing western clothes", of consuming western products and holding informal women-only gatherings. They have also criticized her for using the internet and audiovisual aids in preaching, methods that they deem as western.

Liberal and secular outlets have criticized her for "not going far enough" in her progressive interpretation of Islam. She has also been criticized for allowing polygamy. Due to her unbending religious doctrines she has been termed a Wahabi by some liberal activists like Raheel Raza. Although Hashmi and Al-Huda have stated that they do not follow any particular sect of contemporary Islam and refer to themselves simply as Muslims as was done during the time of early Islam.

== Awards ==
- "The Muslim 500 – The 500 Most Influential Muslims."
