= 2017 North Park Elementary School shooting =

School shooting in San Bernardino, California

Coordinates: 34.1793°N 117.3012°W

- Location: San Bernardino, California, U.S.
- Date: April 10, 2017; 9 years ago Before 10:30 a.m. (PDT)
- Target: Karen Elaine Smith, a special education teacher at North Park Elementary School and the shooter's wife
- Attack type: School shooting, murder–suicide, domestic violence, workplace violence
- Weapon: Smith & Wesson .357 Magnum revolver
- Deaths: 3 (including the perpetrator)
- Injuries: 1
- Perpetrator: Cedric Anderson

Map of San Bernardino

On April 10, 2017, a shooting occurred inside a special education classroom at North Park Elementary School in San Bernardino, California. The shooting was an apparent murder–suicide and an act of domestic violence. Three people—the gunman; his wife, who taught at the school; and a student standing behind her—died from their wounds. Another student was wounded and hospitalized.

== Background ==
The shooting followed a terrorist attack that occurred in San Bernardino in December 2015. After that attack, the San Bernardino City Unified School District reexamined its security measures and gave all of the school principals lockdown training. North Park Elementary School is located about 7 miles (11 km) from the Inland Regional Center, the main location of the 2015 terrorist attack.

== Shooting ==
On the morning of April 10, external CCTV recorded the gunman's failed attempt to enter North Park Elementary School through a locked secondary door. He then went through the main entrance and was permitted entry after he told administrators that he had to drop something off to his wife. He was allowed entry as it was not uncommon for someone to visit a school campus to meet up with their spouse, and no one noticed his concealed gun. Staffers were also already aware of the gunman beforehand, but had no knowledge of the couple's ongoing conflict, and did not recognize any signs of agitation from him.

Shortly before 10:30 a.m., he entered Classroom B-1, a special education classroom where his wife taught, and walked "a short distance" inside. The 53-year-old teacher was standing in the middle of the room, about ten to fifteen feet away from the door. Without saying a word, the man opened fire with a "large-caliber revolver", firing ten rounds and reloading once before shooting himself. Both the gunman and the teacher died. There were fifteen students ranging from the first to fourth grades, along with two teacher's aides, also in the classroom at the time. Two of the students suffered gunshot wounds, with one of them mortally wounded.

A nine-year-old girl who witnessed the shooting said that the gunman "shot everywhere", and that one of the students was shot in the stomach.

Other teachers initially mistook the gunshots as loud noises being caused by a maintenance crew working nearby. When they realized an active shooting was underway, one of the teachers left her workroom to shepherd students in the hallway to safety and to check on classrooms. She eventually sought shelter inside a classroom.

The first responding officers arrived at North Park Elementary School within seven minutes of receiving the first 9-1-1 call. They confirmed the presence of multiple victims at approximately 10:45 a.m.

== Victims ==
Both the gunman and a teacher were killed, with two students injured. The two injured students were transported to Loma Linda University Medical Center (LLUMC). One of them, identified as eight-year-old Jonathan Martinez, had to be airlifted, but he later died there. After his death, Martinez's family requested privacy, but also asked the media to raise awareness about a developmental disorder called Williams syndrome, which Martinez suffered from.

The second injured student, identified as nine-year-old Nolan Brandy, was in stable condition, having been hit in the upper body, after initially being described as being in critical condition. School officials said that Brandy was "recovering well" on April 13, and by the next day, he had been discharged from LLUMC to continue recovery at home.

== Aftermath ==
Students at the nearby California State University, San Bernardino (CSUSB) campus, as well as two other elementary schools, were asked to shelter in place for an hour during the incident. About 500–600 other students were in attendance at the time of the shooting. By about 12:00 p.m., they were all transported by bus to the CSUSB campus, then to the nearby Cajon High School.

North Park Elementary School was closed down, but eventually reopened on April 17. Plans were made to move Class B-1 out of the classroom and into another one. Grief counselors were available at Del Vallejo Middle School on April 11, the day after the shooting.

A GoFundMe campaign was set up to pay for Martinez's funeral, and has since raised more than $120,000 as of April 13. Another GoFundMe campaign was set up to help Brandy's recovery in the hospital.

== Investigation ==
Chief Jarrod Burguan said that Martinez and Brandy were standing behind their teacher when all three were shot, but that the boys were not targeted and may have merely been struck by stray bullets. However, one of the teacher's aides who witnessed the shooting said that the gunman intentionally attempted to shoot the other aide, but had run out of ammunition.

Following the shooting, police searched the gunman's home. There, they found a handwritten note purportedly penned by the gunman; Chief Burguan said that it referenced the gunman's relationship with the teacher, but was not a suicide note outside the context of the shooting. He also said that the note referenced "needing closure and feeling disrespected and dishonored". They also recovered a computer and a phone from the home. A man, later identified as the gunman's brother, was interviewed in police custody and later released.

On April 14, police released two recordings of 9-1-1 calls made during the shooting.

=== School security measures ===
Dale Marsden, the superintendent of San Bernardino City Unified School District, promised a reexamination of North Park Elementary School's security measures. The shooting also prompted schools in Montana to reexamine their own security measures. On April 13, Marsden announced that fingerprinted volunteers will be the only non-staff members allowed into North Park Elementary, and that the school district will review a possible larger application of that rule in the future.

== Perpetrator ==
Cedric Anderson (March 19, 1964 – April 10, 2017), a resident of Riverside, was identified as the perpetrator. He was in a four-year-long relationship with Karen Elaine Smith, the slain teacher, but the two were only married from January to March. Their marriage ended by separation. At the time of the shooting, he was unemployed and attempting to start his own business. He had a criminal history of weapons charges, accusations of domestic violence, and drug charges spanning from 1982 to 2013, but no convictions ever resulted from those arrests. These charges predated his marriage to Smith.

Before meeting Smith, Anderson lived around Atlanta, Georgia; Las Vegas, Nevada; and other cities in Southern California. In the late 1990s or early 2000s, he participated in an exposé by Las Vegas NBC affiliate KSNV on housing fees at Nellis Air Force Base. The report said that Anderson had been in the U.S. Navy for eight years and was married to a nineteen-year Air Force veteran who had been deployed to Pakistan. Cedric Anderson served in the U.S. Navy, completing RTC in San Diego in November 1983, company 153. After boot camp he became a hull technician. Anderson went on to post a video of the exposé on YouTube.

=== Domestic troubles ===
Anderson's history of domestic violence accusations was extensively documented in filings obtained by the New York Daily News. According to the filings, he had been married to another woman for eleven years before their marriage ended in 1996. In January 1997, the ex-wife filed a petition for a domestic violence restraining order against him. In the petition, she claimed that Anderson had threatened to kill her, their three sons, and himself, then later threatened to kidnap their children. In a follow-up filing, the woman claimed that Anderson had assaulted her in front of his sister after he dropped off their children. She reported the assault to police, but did not let officers arrest him in front of their sons. According to her, Anderson later "talked" her into dropping the restraining order, but continued to verbally abuse her afterwards. Their divorce was finalized later in 1997. In 2013, a former live-in girlfriend won a three-year restraining order after claiming that Anderson assaulted her on two occasions, one of which nearly killed her.

Anderson had made frequent social media posts about his wife in the month preceding the attack, in which he depicted their relationship as loving and ignored their marital troubles. Smith's son from a previous relationship described Anderson as "paranoid and possessive", which was what led to his mother ending the marriage. According to Chief Burguan, Anderson had apparently contacted Smith before the shooting and tried to get her to return to him, and also made threats towards her that were not taken seriously. However, Smith's relatives said that she began staying at their homes in order to hide from him.

A man recalled meeting Anderson at a gas station two weeks prior to the shooting. The man had been wearing a hat that caught Anderson's attention, and he confided in him about his troubled marriage and his frustration with Smith's family, who he blamed for their separation. He also claimed that he accidentally touched Smith's chest during an argument, and that Smith then accused him of choking her. The man said Anderson mentioned killing the Smith family during the conversation, which prompted him to invite him to his ministry. There, he and his wife made efforts to help him, but he acknowledged that he could not reach out to him more.

== Reactions ==
The gun-control advocacy group Everytown for Gun Safety said that this shooting was the fourth intentional shooting in a K-12 campus in 2017, and the first to result in fatalities.

Multiple American federal lawmakers released statements condemning the shooting and expressing their condolences to those affected. Secretary of Education Betsy DeVos condemned the shooting as a "horrible act". White House officials called Mayor R. Carey Davis to convey President Donald Trump's "concern for [the] students and teachers". White House Press Secretary Sean Spicer mentioned the shooting during his regular press briefing, in which he called it "tragic and heartbreaking" and wished "a speedy and full recovery" for Brandy.

== See also ==
- List of homicides in California
- List of school shootings in the United States
- List of school shootings in the United States by death toll
