= Rizwan Farook and Tashfeen Malik =

Pakistani-American mass murderers

Rizwan Farook
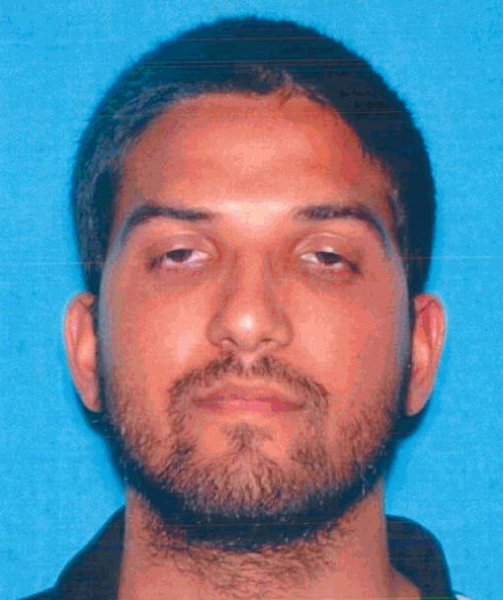
- 2013 driver's license
- Born: Syed Rizwan Farooq; June 14, 1987; Chicago, Illinois, U.S.
- Died: December 2, 2015 (aged 28); San Bernardino, California, U.S.
- Cause of death: Gunshot wounds
- Education: La Sierra High School
- Alma mater: Cal State San Bernardino
- Spouse: Tashfeen Malik (m. 2014–2015)
- Children: 1 daughter (b. 2015)

Details
- Date: December 2, 2015; 10:59 a.m. – ~3:00 p.m.
- Location: Inland Regional Center
- Target: San Bernardino County employees attending a holiday event
- Killed: 14 (together with Malik)
- Injured: 24 (together with Malik)
- Weapons: Smith & Wesson M&P15 Sport II semi-automatic rifle; Springfield Armory XD-M 9 mm pistol; Pipe bombs

Tashfeen Malik
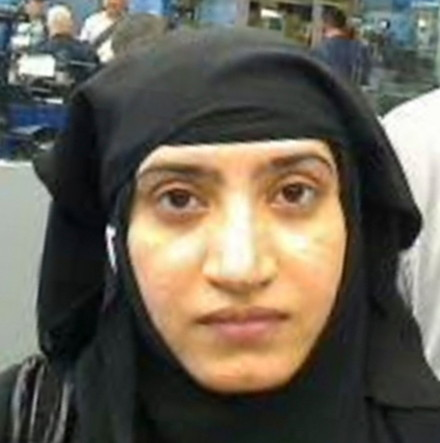
- Malik at O'Hare Airport in 2014
- Born: July 13, 1986; Karor Lal Esan, Punjab, Pakistan
- Died: December 2, 2015 (aged 29); San Bernardino, California, U.S.
- Cause of death: Gunshot wounds
- Education: Bahauddin Zakariya University
- Spouse: Syed Rizwan Farook (m. 2014–2015)
- Children: 1 daughter (b. 2015)

Details
- Date: December 2, 2015; 10:59 a.m. – ~3:00 p.m.
- Location: Inland Regional Center
- Target: San Bernardino County employees attending a holiday event
- Killed: 14 (together with Farook)
- Injured: 24 (together with Farook)
- Weapons: Panther Arms AR-15 semi-automatic rifle; Llama Arms 9 mm pistol; Pipe bombs

Syed Rizwan Farook (Note: Urdu: سيد رضوان فاروق) (June 14, 1987 – December 2, 2015) and Tashfeen Malik (Note: Urdu: تاشفين ملک / Hindustani pronunciation: [tɑːʃfiːn məlɪk]) (July 13, 1986 – December 2, 2015) were a Pakistani-American mass murder duo who were the two perpetrators of an Islamic terrorist attack at the Inland Regional Center in San Bernardino, California, United States on December 2, 2015. In the attack, they killed 14 people and injured 22 others. Both died in a shootout with law enforcement later that day.

== Backgrounds ==
=== Rizwan Farook ===
Farook was born on June 14, 1987, in Chicago, United States, as one of four children to Muslim immigrant parents. His father, a truck driver, was born in Pakistan while his mother, a billing clerk, was born in India.

==== Personal life ====
According to sources, Farook had a "troubled childhood" and grew up in an abusive home in which his alcoholic father was often violent towards his mother. Farook grew up in Riverside, California, and attended La Sierra High School, graduating in 2004, one year early. He attended California State University, San Bernardino, and received a bachelor's degree in environmental health in either 2009 or 2010. He was a student for one semester in 2014 at California State University, Fullerton in their graduate program for environmental engineering, but never completed the program.

Farook's older brother left home shortly after high school to enlist in the United States Navy, serving between 2003 and 2007 during the Iraq War on the USS Enterprise. In 2006, Farook's parents divorced, with his mother citing her husband's domestic abuse and declining mental health, which had included numerous suicide threats.

Farook had a profile on the dating website iMilap.com, in which he listed backyard target practice as a hobby. A lawyer for Farook's family also said that he would go to firing ranges by himself.

Farook worked as a food inspector for the San Bernardino County Department of Public Health for five years before the shooting. From July to December 2010, he was a seasonal employee for the county. He was hired as an environmental health specialist trainee on January 28, 2012, and became a permanent employee on February 8, 2014. Coworkers described Farook as quiet and polite, and said that he held no obvious grudges.

==== Religious views and travels ====
According to family members and coworkers, Farook was a devout Sunni Muslim, and traveled to Saudi Arabia several times, including to complete the hajj in 2013. Farook attended prayers at the Islamic Center of Riverside twice a day, in the mornings and the evenings, according to an interview in The New York Times with Mustafa H. Kuko, the center's director. According to the Times, Farook stood out as especially devout and "kept a bit of a distance" from other congregants. During that time, according to friends, he never discussed politics. Farook abruptly stopped going to the mosque in 2014 following his marriage.

The Italian newspaper La Stampa reported that Farook's father said that his son "shared the ideology of Al Baghdadi to create an Islamic state" and that he was fixated with Israel. A spokesperson for the Council on American–Islamic Relations (CAIR) later claimed the father did not recall making these statements about his son.

=== Tashfeen Malik ===
Tashfeen Malik was born in Karor Lal Esan, Pakistan, located 450 kilometers (280 mi) southwest of Islamabad. Her landowning family was described as politically influential in the town. According to her family, Malik and her father lived in Jeddah, Saudi Arabia, between 1990 and 2007, though Saudi Interior Ministry spokesman Major General Mansour Al-Turki denied reports that Malik grew up in his country, saying that she visited Saudi Arabia only for a few weeks in 2008 and again in 2013.

==== Studies in Multan ====
Malik returned to Pakistan to study pharmacology at Bahauddin Zakariya University in Multan, beginning the program in 2007 and graduating in 2012. She was described as a top student and social but apolitical. The city of Multan has been linked to jihadist activity. While in Multan, Malik attended the local center of the Al-Huda International Seminary, a women-only religious academy network with seminaries across Pakistan and branches in the U.S. and Canada that was founded in 1994. The school is aligned with the Wahhabi form of Sunni Islam. According to school records, Malik enrolled in an eighteen-month Quranic studies course with Al-Huda on April 17, 2013, and left on May 3, 2014, telling administrators that she was leaving to get married. Malik expressed an interest in completing the course by correspondence, but never did so.

According to experts, Al-Huda "draws much of its support from women from educated, relatively affluent backgrounds." Faiza Mushtaq, a Pakistani scholar that studied the organization, said that "these Al-Huda classes are teaching these urban, educated, upper-middle-class women a very conservative interpretation of Islam that makes them very judgmental about others around them." According to the Los Angeles Times, Al-Huda seminaries promote anti-Western views and hard-line practices in a fashion that "could encourage some adherents to lash out against non-believers." The New York Times reported that the institute "teaches a strict literalist interpretation of the Quran, although it does not advocate violent jihad." An Al-Huda administrator from the head office in Islamabad said that terrorism "is against the teachings of Islam" and that the school's curriculum did not endorse violence.

==== Marriage and entry into United States ====
According to one of Farook's coworkers, Malik and her husband married about a month after he traveled to Saudi Arabia in early 2014; the two had met over the Internet. Malik joined Farook in California shortly after their wedding. A U.S. marriage certificate reported their marriage in Riverside on August 16, 2014. At the time of her death, Malik and Farook had a six-month-old daughter.

Malik entered the United States on a K-1 (fiancée) visa with a Pakistani passport. According to a State Department spokesman, all applicants for such visas are fully screened. Malik's application for permanent residency (a "green card") was completed by Farook on her behalf in September 2014, and she was granted a conditional green card in July 2015. Obtaining such a green card would have required the couple to prove that the marriage was legitimate. As is standard practice, as part of her visa application with the State Department and application for a green card, Malik submitted her fingerprints and underwent "three extensive national security and criminal background screenings" using Homeland Security and State Department databases. Malik also underwent two in-person interviews, the first with a consular officer in Pakistan and the second with an immigration officer in the U.S. after applying for a green card. No irregularities or signs of suspicion were found in the record of Malik's interview with the Pakistani consular officer.

Malik reportedly had become very religious in the years before the attack, wearing both the niqab and burqa while urging others to do so as well. Pakistani media reported that Malik had ties to the radical Red Mosque in Islamabad, but a cleric and a spokesman from the mosque vehemently denied these claims, saying that they had never heard of Malik before the shooting. Malik's estranged relatives say that she had left the moderate Islam of her family and had become radicalized while living in Saudi Arabia. Saudi Interior Ministry spokesman Al-Turki rejected this claim, stating that Saudi officials received no indication that Malik was radicalized while living there.

=== Internet activities ===
On December 16, 2015, FBI Director James B. Comey said, "We can see from our investigation that in late 2013, before there is a physical meeting of these two people [Farook and Malik] resulting in their engagement and then journey to the United States, they are communicating online, showing signs in that communication of their joint commitment to jihadism and to martyrdom. Those communications are direct, private messages."

Early reports had erroneously stated that Malik had openly expressed jihadist beliefs on social media, leading to calls for U.S. immigration officials to routinely review social media as part of background checks, which is not part of the current procedure. Comey subsequently clarified that the remarks were "direct private messages" that were not publicly accessible and that "So far, in this investigation, we have found no evidence of posting on social media."

Comey said that the FBI's investigation had revealed that Farook and Malik were "consuming poison on the Internet" and both had become radicalized "before they started courting or dating each other online" and "before the emergence of ISIL." As a result, Comey said that "untangling the motivations of which particular terrorist propaganda motivated in what way remains a challenge in these investigations, and our work is ongoing there."

== Planning of the attack ==
A Senate Judiciary Committee testimony given on December 9, 2015, FBI Director James Comey said that the FBI investigation has shown that Farook and Malik were "homegrown violent extremists" who were "inspired by foreign terrorist organizations." Comey also said that Farook and Malik "were talking to each other about jihad and martyrdom," before their engagement and as early as the end of 2013. They reportedly spent at least a year preparing for the attack, including taking target practice and making plans to take care of their child and Farook's mother. Comey has said that although the investigation has shown that Farook and Malik were radicalized and possibly inspired by foreign terrorist organizations, there is no indication that the couple were directed by such a group or part of a broader cell or network.

The FBI has said that there were "telephonic connections" between the couple and other people of interest in FBI probes. Comey said that the case did not follow the typical pattern for mass shootings or terrorist attacks. A senior U.S. law enforcement official said that Farook contacted "persons of interest" who were possibly tied to terrorism, although these contacts were not "substantial." A senior federal official said that Farook had some contact with people from the Nusra Front, the official al-Qaeda affiliate in Syria, and Shabaab of Somalia, but specifics were unclear.

=== Weapons ===
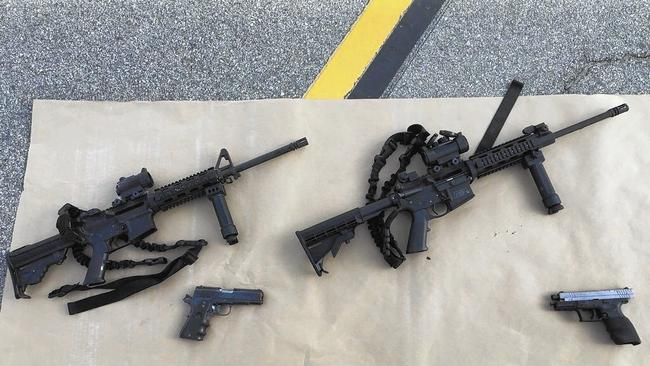
The four guns used by the shooters. Released by the San Bernardino County Sheriff's Department.

Farook and Malik used two .223-caliber semi-automatic rifles, two 9 mm caliber semi-automatic pistols, and an explosive device in the attack. The rifles used were variants of the AR-15: one was a DPMS Panther Arms A15, the other was a Smith & Wesson M&P15.

The two rifles were purchased by Enrique Marquez Jr., a next-door neighbor of Farook's until May 2015 who is related to him by marriage. After their purchases, the rifles were illegally transferred to Farook. The two pistols were legally purchased by Farook from federally licensed firearms dealers in Corona, California, in 2011 and 2012. One of the handguns was a Llama Model XI-B and the other was a Springfield Armory XD Bi-Tone.

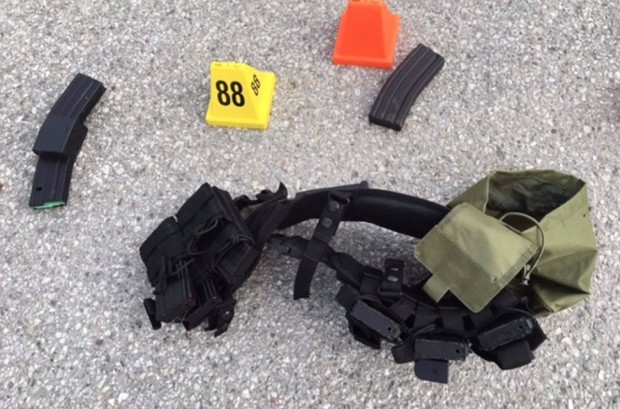
Tactical belt used by one of the shooters. Released by the San Bernardino County Sheriff's Department

The couple altered the guns: there was a failed attempt to modify the Smith & Wesson rifle to fire in fully automatic mode, they made a modification that defeated the ban on detachable magazines, and they used a detachable high-capacity magazine. California laws limit magazines to a maximum of ten rounds, and prior to this attack the magazine had to be fixed by a recessed button mechanism to the rifle and require a tool such as a bullet, pen, or other implement to remove it, thereby creating a delay in the rate at which spent magazines can be replaced. According to the Bureau of Alcohol, Tobacco, Firearms and Explosives, the modifications made the guns illegal assault weapons. The couple also taped magazines together to make switching them out easier. They had a total of 2,363 rounds (1,879 for the rifles and 484 for the handguns) with them at the time of the shootout.

The explosive device left at the Inland Regional Center comprised three explosive devices connected to one another. It was contained inside the backpack left by Farook during the departmental event. The devices were described as pipe bombs constructed with Christmas lights and tied together, combined with a remote-controlled car that was switched on. The poorly constructed devices failed to explode.

The large stockpile of weapons used by Farook and Malik led investigators to believe that they intended to carry out further attacks. An examination of digital equipment recovered from their home suggested that the couple was in the final planning stages of a much larger attack.

=== Shooting range video ===
After law enforcement sources confirmed that Farook spent time on November 29–30, 2015, at the Riverside Magnum Shooting Range, about 25 miles (40 km) away from the couple's Redlands home, the FBI obtained surveillance video from the range. During these visits, one lasting several hours, Farook shot an AR-15 and a pistol, which he had brought to the range. One of the paper torso silhouette targets used in the video was later recovered from the couple's SUV following their deaths.

=== Bank transaction ===
Two weeks before the shooting, Farook took out a loan of US$28,500 which was deposited in his bank account. The San Francisco-based online lender Prosper Marketplace made the loan to Farook; Prosper evaluates borrowers and the loans are originated by a third-party bank, the Salt Lake City-based WebBank.com. On or about November 20, 2015, Farook withdrew US$10,000 in cash, and later on two US$5,000 transfers were made to what appears to be Farook's mother's bank account. Investigators were exploring the possibility that the US$10,000 was used to reimburse someone for the purchase of the rifles used in the shooting. WebBank said that it was fully cooperating with the investigation.

== Terrorist attack ==
On the morning of the December 2 attack, Farook and Malik left their six-month-old daughter with Farook's mother at their Redlands home, telling her that they were going to a doctor's appointment. Farook then attended a departmental event at the banquet room of the Inland Regional Center. The event began as a semi-annual all-staff meeting and training event, and was in the process of transitioning into a department holiday party/luncheon when the shooting began.

Farook arrived at the departmental event at about 8:30 a.m. and left midway through it at around 10:30 a.m., leaving a backpack containing explosives atop a table. Coworkers reported that Farook had been quiet for the duration of the event. He posed for photos with other coworkers.

At 10:59 a.m. PST, Farook and Malik armed themselves and opened fire on those in attendance. During the attack, they wore ski masks and black tactical gear. The entire shooting lasted less than four minutes, and Farook and Malik fired between 65 and 75 bullets. The couple departed the scene before police arrived. The explosive devices placed by Farook were later detonated by a bomb squad.

The attack was the second-deadliest mass shooting in California after the 1984 San Ysidro McDonald's massacre. It was also the deadliest mass shooting in the U.S. since the Sandy Hook Elementary School shooting, until the 2016 Orlando nightclub shooting six months later. Malik was one of a small number of female mass shooters in the U.S.; women constituted only 3.75 percent of active shooters in the U.S. from 2000 to 2013.

=== Deaths ===
After the attack, a witness recognized Farook and identified him to police. When officers responded to Farook and Malik's Redlands home, both fled in a sports utility vehicle (SUV), resulting in a police pursuit. At least one fake explosive was thrown at the police during the chase.

The chase ended in a suburban neighborhood about 1.7 miles (2.7 km) away from the scene of the initial attack. There, Farook and Malik exchanged gunfire with officers. The gunfire lasted for around five minutes before both Farook and Malik were killed by police bullets. Farook died from 26 gunshot wounds, sustained mostly in the legs and including one in the chin where the bullet fragmented into his neck. Malik died from fifteen gunshot wounds, thirteen to the body and two to the head.

== Aftermath ==
After Farook's and Malik's corpses were released by law enforcement, local Islamic cemeteries refused to accept the remains. It took a week to find a willing cemetery, and the burial ultimately took place in Rosamond, California. According to two members of the mosque, many of the city's Muslim community refused to attend the funeral on December 15, 2015, which was attended by around ten mourners including relatives of Farook.

Farook's and Malik's corpses were buried per traditional Muslim rituals at an Islamic cemetery, according to Reuters.

In one Arabic-language online radio broadcast, ISIL described Farook and Malik as "supporters" following the attack. During the police investigation into the attack, The New York Times reported that this language indicated "a less direct connection" between the shooters and the terrorist group. In a December 5, 2015, English-language broadcast on its Bayan radio station, ISIL referred to Farook and Malik as "soldiers of the caliphate," which is a phrase ISIL uses to denote members of the terrorist organization. The New York Times reported that it was unclear why the two versions differed.

On February 9, 2016, the FBI announced that it was unable to unlock one of the mobile phones they had recovered from Farook and Malik's home because of the phone's advanced security features. The phone was an iPhone 5C owned by the county and issued to Farook during his employment with them. When asked by the FBI to create a new version of the phone's iOS operating system that could be installed and run in the phone's random access memory to disable certain security features, Apple Inc. declined due to its policy to never undermine the security features of its products. The FBI responded by successfully applying to a United States magistrate judge to issue a court order under the All Writs Act of 1789, mandating Apple to create and provide the requested software. Citing security risks posed towards their customers as a result of such software, Apple announced their intent to oppose the order, resulting in a dispute between the company and the FBI. The dispute eventually ended on March 28, 2016, when the U.S. Department of Justice announced that it had unlocked the iPhone.

The San Bernardino County Sheriff's Department released autopsies for the 14 victims on May 27, 2016. In the fall of 2020 in response to a Denver radio program's public records request the department released the autopsies for Farook and Malik.

On May 31, 2016, federal prosecutors filed a lawsuit against Farook's family. This lawsuit would allow them to seize both the proceeds of two life insurance policies (and the policies themselves) held by Farook, both of which listed Farook's mother as the beneficiary. One policy worth US$25,000 was taken out by Farook in 2012 when he started working for the county, while the other, worth US$250,000, was taken out the following year. According to NBC News, "Under federal law, assets derived from terrorism are subject to forfeiture. A federal judge must approve an application before the government can seize the money." In the six-page lawsuit, the life insurance company claimed that Farook's mother was aware of her son's intentions to carry out the attack, and reasoned that she should not be entitled to the benefits as a result. On September 2, 2016, government officials said they wanted to give the money to the victims' families.

On March 3, 2020, Farook's mother, Rafia Farook, pleaded guilty to a federal criminal charge of intending to impede a federal criminal investigation by shredding a map. On February 11, 2021, she was sentenced to six months of home confinement as part of the plea deal.

In October 2020, Sayeed Farook's confidant, Enrique Marquez Jr., received a 20-year federal prison term for helping acquire the semi-automatic rifles.

== See also ==
- List of rampage killers (religious, political, or ethnic crimes)
