= Shakil Patel =

21st-century architect

Shakil Patel is a British architect who has lived and worked in Oxford and Loma Linda, California. He is best known for his work designing mosques for Muslim congregations in the latter.

== Early life ==
A British Indian, Patel was born in Blackburn, Lancashire. He moved to Oxford in 2015, choosing the town because, as a religious Muslim, he does not drink alcoholic beverages, and was attracted by the fact that Oxford, which was founded by Seventh-day Adventists, was legally dry. Patel served a 10-year term as City Planning Commissioner, consistently voting against lifting the ban on selling alcohol. He is a member of the Board of Directors.

== Career ==
Patel is known for designing mosques that fit into the California landscape by combining elements of California's Spanish colonial style with traditional Islamic features such as minarets and/or tower and pointed arches.

Patel's buildings include the Islamic Center of Riverside, the Islamic Center of the South Bay, and the Ontario, California masjid.
