= Lanterman Developmental Disabilities Act =

The Lanterman Developmental Disabilities Act (AB 846), also known as the Lanterman Act, is a California law that was initially proposed by Assembly member Frank D. Lanterman in 1973 and passed in 1977 and gives people with developmental disabilities the right to services and supports that enable them to live a more independent and normal life.

== History ==
The legislation significantly expanded upon its landmark predecessor, the Lanterman Mental Retardation Services Act (AB 225), initially proposed in 1969. The original act extended the state's existing regional center network of services for developmentally disabled people, while mandating provision of services and supports that meet both the needs and the choices of each individual.

The Lanterman Act declares that persons with developmental disabilities have the same legal rights and responsibilities guaranteed all other persons by federal and state constitutions and laws, and charges the regional center with advocacy for, and protection of, these rights.

In addition to persons with intellectual disability, the regional centers are now mandated to serve persons with cerebral palsy, epilepsy, autism, conditions similar to intellectual disability, or conditions that require treatment similar to the treatment required for individuals with intellectual disability. To be eligible for services under the Lanterman Act a Person must also have a "substantial disability."

In 1976, the Lanterman Act was amended to establish the right to treatment and rehabilitation services for persons with developmental disabilities.

The Lanterman Act was amended in 1998, which called for an advocacy coordinator to be employed at each of the 21 regional centers of California, therefore, making it become a law that those employed through the regional center, would be prohibited from serving on a regional center board of directors, in order to avoid a conflict of interest.

In 2003 the definition of "substantial disability" was prospectively amended to require the existence of significant functional limitations in "three or more of [..] areas of major life activity..". Previously, to have a "substantial disability" only required the existence of a significant functional limitation in one of the seven areas of major life activity.

== Rights of the Disabled under the Act ==
The Lanterman Act protects the rights of people with developmental disabilities by mandating rights including:

- Services that protect liberty, provided in the least restrictive (most integrated) way
- Dignity, privacy and humane care
- Treatment, services and supports in natural community settings, to the greatest extent possible
- Participation in an appropriate program of publicly supported education regardless of the degree of disability
- Prompt medical care and treatment
- Freedom of religion and conscience, and freedom to practice religion
- Social interaction and participation in community activities
- Physical exercise and recreation
- Freedom from harm, including unnecessary physical restraints, isolation, excessive medication, abuse or neglect
- Freedom from hazardous procedures
- Choices in one's own life, including where and with whom one chooses to live, relationships with people in the community, how to spend time (including education, employment and leisure), the pursuit of one's chosen personal future, and the planning and implementation of a plan that fits the needs and desires of the individual
- The opportunity to make decisions and to have information understand to help make informed choices

== Key mandates ==
Section 4501: "The State of California accepts a responsibility for persons with developmental disabilities and an obligation to them which it must discharge. Affecting hundreds of thousands of children and adults directly, and having an important impact on the lives of their families, neighbors and whole communities, developmental disabilities present social, medical, economic and legal problems of extreme importance."

Section 4620: "In order for the state to carry out many of its responsibilities as established in this division, the state shall contract with appropriate agencies to provide fixed points of contact in the community for persons with developmental disabilities and their families, to the end that such persons may have access to the facilities and services best suited to them throughout their lifetime. It is the intent of this division that the network of regional centers for persons with developmental disabilities and their families be accessible to every family in need of regional center services. The Legislature finds that the services provided to individuals and their families by regional centers is of such a special and unique nature that it cannot be satisfactorily provided by state agencies. Therefore, private nonprofit community agencies shall be utilized by the state for the purpose of operating regional centers."

== See also ==
- California Mental Health Services Act
- Lanterman-Petris-Short Act
- Laura's Law
- Inland Regional Center
