= 2015 San Bernardino attack =

Mass shooting in California, U.S.

- Location: 34°04′30″N 117°16′39″W (Initial active-shooter site); 34°04′39″N 117°14′54″W (Final shootout with police); Inland Regional Center; San Bernardino, California, U.S.
- Date: December 2, 2015; 10 years ago Shooting: 10:58 – c. 11:00 a.m. (PST); Police pursuit and shootout: 3:08 – 3:14 p.m. (PST)
- Target: San Bernardino County employees attending a holiday event
- Attack type: Mass shooting; mass murder; workplace shooting; terrorism; car chase; shootout; attempted bombing
- Weapons: AR-15 style rifles (DPMS Panther Arms A-15 & Smith & Wesson M&P15); 9mm semi-automatic pistols (Llama Model XI-B & Springfield Armory XD Bi-Tone); Pipe bombs (failed to explode)
- Deaths: 16 (including both perpetrators)
- Injuries: 24
- Perpetrator: Rizwan Farook and Tashfeen Malik
- Motive: Islamic terrorism

On December 2, 2015, an Islamic terrorist attack, consisting of a mass shooting and an attempted bombing, occurred at the Inland Regional Center in San Bernardino, California, United States. The perpetrators, Syed Rizwan Farook and Tashfeen Malik, a married couple living in the city of Redlands, targeted a San Bernardino County Department of Public Health training event and Christmas party of about 80 employees in a rented banquet room. Fourteen people were killed and 22 others were seriously injured. Farook was a Muslim and an American-born citizen of Pakistani descent, who worked as a health department employee. Malik was a Muslim and Pakistani-born green card holder. After the shooting, the couple fled in a rented Ford Expedition SUV. Four hours later, police pursued their vehicle and killed them in a shootout, which also left two officers injured.

According to the FBI's investigation, the perpetrators were "homegrown violent extremists" inspired by foreign terrorist groups. They were not directed by such groups and were not part of any terrorist cell or network. FBI investigators have said that Farook and Malik had become radicalized over several years prior to the attack, consuming "poison on the internet" and expressing a commitment to jihadism and martyrdom in private messages to each other. Farook and Malik had traveled to Saudi Arabia in the years before the attack. The couple had amassed a large stockpile of weapons, ammunition, and bomb-making equipment in their home.

Enrique Marquez Jr., a friend and former neighbor of Farook's, was investigated in connection with his purchase of the two rifles used in the attack. Marquez was arrested in December 2015, and later pleaded guilty to federal charges of providing material support for terrorism and making false statements in connection with the acquisition of a firearm. Marquez also admitted that, in 2011, he conspired with Farook to carry out shooting and bombing attacks, plans which were abandoned at the time. Three other people, including Farook's brother and sister-in-law, were arrested for immigration fraud in connection with a sham marriage between Marquez and Mariya Chernykh (the sister-in-law of Farook's brother). All three pleaded guilty.

The attack was the deadliest mass shooting in the U.S. since the 2012 Sandy Hook Elementary School shooting and the deadliest terrorist attack to occur in the U.S. since the September 11 attacks. It was surpassed by the Orlando nightclub shooting in June 2016. The attack remains the deadliest mass shooting in California since the 1984 San Ysidro McDonald's massacre.

== Events ==
=== Before the attack ===
Farook and Malik left their six-month-old daughter with Farook's mother at their Redlands home the morning of the attack, saying they were going to a doctor's appointment. Farook, a health inspector for the San Bernardino County Department of Public Health, attended a departmental event at the banquet room of the Inland Regional Center. The event began as a semi-annual all-staff meeting and training event, and was in the process of transitioning into a department holiday party/luncheon when the shooting began. There were a total of 91 invited guests, with 75–80 people stated to have been in attendance.

Farook arrived at the departmental event at about 8:30 a.m. and left midway through it at around 10:30 a.m., leaving a backpack atop a table. Coworkers reported that Farook had been quiet for the duration of the event, and that he had been looking at his phone before his departure. He posed for photos with other coworkers.

=== Inland Regional Center attack ===
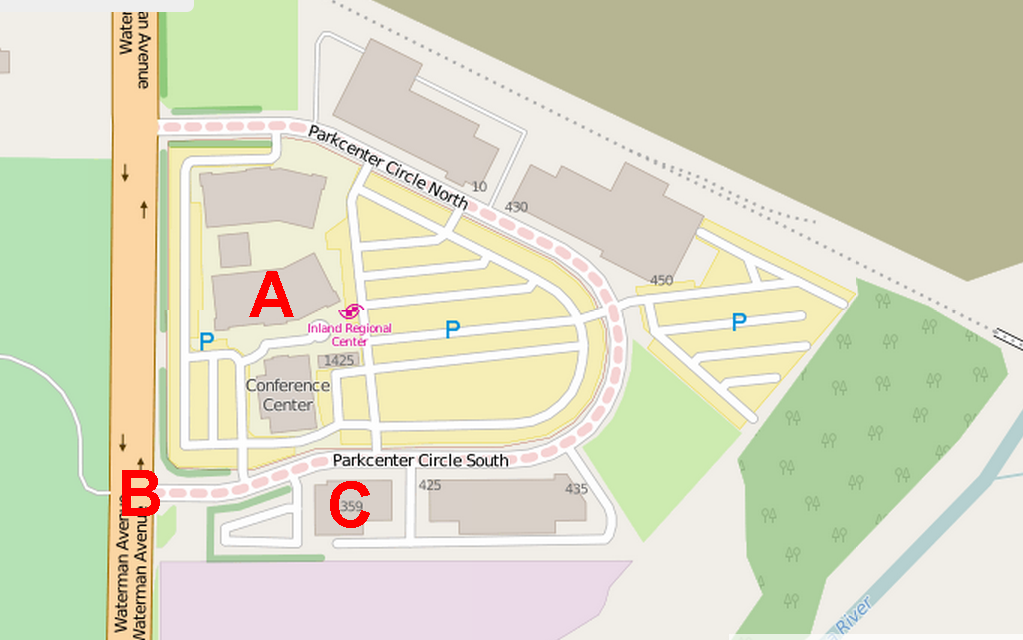
A – Bldg#2 B – Injured people treated C – School for the blind where some took shelter while awaiting hospital treatment. The Conference Center – Site where shooting happened.

Shortly before 11:00 a.m., the event went on an unscheduled break due to a technical problem. At 10:58 a.m. PST, Farook and Malik, armed with semi-automatic pistols and rifles, opened fire outside the building, killing two people. Farook entered the building a minute later, firing on those in attendance. He was followed quickly by Malik. They wore ski masks and black tactical gear (including load bearing vests holding magazines and ammunition), but not ballistic or bulletproof vests. The entire shooting took two or three minutes, during which the shooters fired more than 100 bullets before fleeing.

During the shooting, many of those in attendance managed to escape the room and flee deeper into the building, while those who remained hid underneath tables or in bathrooms, closets, and cupboards. A bullet hit a fire sprinkler pipe, causing water to pour down the banquet room, making it difficult to see. The perpetrators moved between tables, shooting anyone who moved or made a sound. One person was struck by a bullet that tore through an interior wall, while another was shot while trying to escape through a glass door near where the shooters had entered. Three men attempted to stop one of the shooters, but all were shot; it was unclear if any of them survived. One victim was killed while shielding a coworker with his body. Some initially mistook the attack as an active shooter drill; as some previous active shooter drills had taken place in the same banquet room.

An unidentified source told an NPR journalist that witnesses appeared to recognize Farook by his voice and build. Other witnesses easily identified one of the shooters as a female because of her build and clothes. Sources reported that Malik pledged bay'ah (allegiance) to Abu Bakr al-Baghdadi, the leader of Islamic State of Iraq and the Levant (ISIL), on a Facebook account associated with her as the attack was underway. Later reports described the posting as being made on behalf of both shooters.

The perpetrators left three explosive devices connected to one another at the Inland Regional Center, contained inside the backpack left by Farook during the departmental event. The devices were described as pipe bombs constructed with Christmas lights and tied together, combined with a remote controlled car that was switched on. The poorly constructed devices failed to explode. Authorities believe that the pipe bombs were meant to target the emergency personnel responding to the scene. The device was hidden inside a canvas bag, and its build was similar to schematics published in al Qaeda's Inspire magazine. Coworkers noticed the bag before the attack occurred, but thought that Farook would return for it and therefore did not investigate it.

=== Police response ===
It took 3 minutes and 32 seconds for the first police unit to respond to the shooting following the initial 9-1-1 emergency call. Two police officers with the San Bernardino Police Department (SBPD) arrived almost simultaneously at 11:04 a.m. When two other SBPD officers arrived two minutes later, the four officers entered the building through the southeast side and began to search for shooters. Another team of four officers (one from SBPD and the others from the Fontana Police Department) entered the building from the northern side and joined the first team in clearing all of the first-floor rooms.

At 11:14 a.m., the San Bernardino Fire Department made a Twitter post (or Tweet) about an emergency on the 1300 block of Waterman Avenue, with the police working to clear the scene. Roads in the area were closed to traffic. The San Bernardino SWAT team happened to be conducting its monthly training exercise a few miles away from the scene at the time of the attack, which allowed them to arrive at the scene within eleven minutes. Police used a battering ram to get into the complex. The first floor was cleared by 11:17 a.m., and a secondary sweep of the building began fourteen minutes later.

As officers searched for shooters inside the building, others aided the wounded. Probation officers initially set up a makeshift triage center near the entrance of the building, but deemed it to be too close and relocated it across the street by 11:15 a.m. Because survivors were soaked from water pouring from the fire sprinkler pipe, they became slippery for officers to hold. Injured victims were carried out on blankets and chairs, as litters and tactical stretchers were unavailable at the time. An SBPD tactical medic supervised the extraction operation. It took 57 minutes to get the last of the injured to a hospital.

Ultimately, about 300 officers and agents from city, county, state, and federal agencies responded to the active-shooter event, converging on the scene as people were being evacuated. The FBI, the ATF, and the Los Angeles Police Department counter-terrorism unit were called in to assist. Police were on the lookout for a black SUV used by the perpetrators to flee the scene.

At 5:08 p.m., the explosive devices placed by Farook were discovered by an FBI SWAT officer. They were later detonated individually by a bomb squad, with the last detonation occurring at 8:37 p.m. Earlier, at 11:33 a.m., an abandoned roller luggage bag was found in a second-floor office and mistaken for a suspicious device, but was deemed safe by 2:22 p.m. The Inland Regional Center was declared clear by authorities at 9:29 p.m.

The U.S. Department of Homeland Security sent a Pilatus PC-12 surveillance aircraft to the area, which circled the skies above San Bernardino for hours, mainly in the area where the shooting took place and in areas under investigation by police, and departed after the shootout between the perpetrators and police.

=== Car pursuit and shootout ===
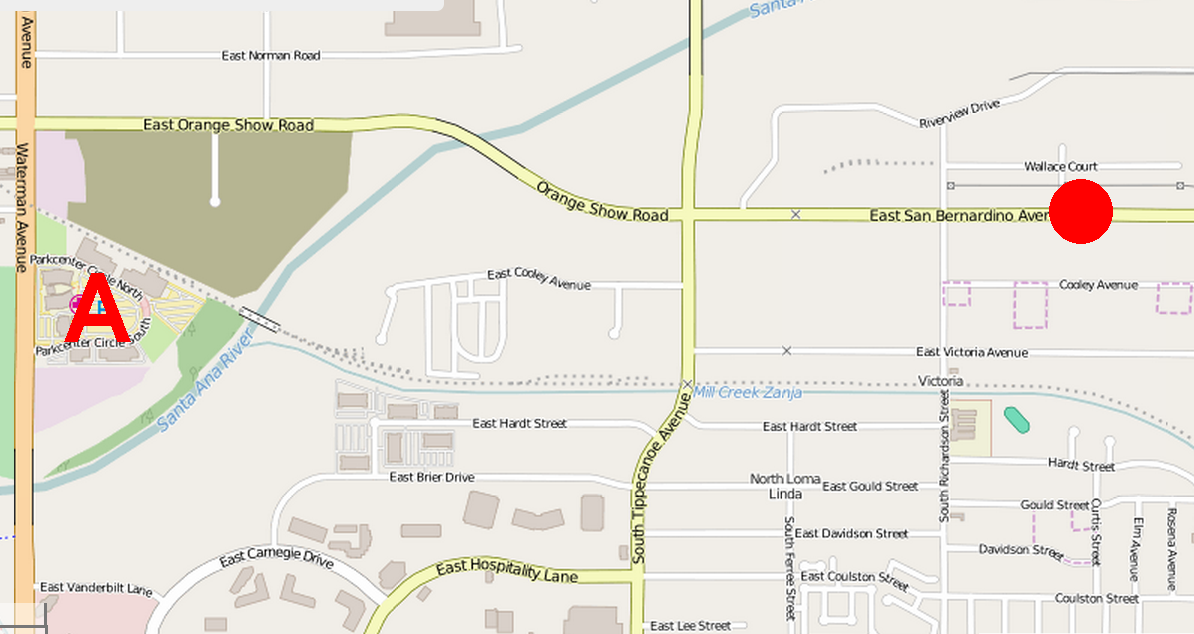
The shootout occurred on the south side of San Bernardino Avenue just east of Sheddon Drive; the red "A" marks the location of the Inland Regional Center.

Law enforcement began a search for the suspects. A witness gave Farook's name to police, who quickly learned that he had rented a black Ford Expedition EL SUV with Utah license plates four days before the attack. Based on information provided by one of Farook's neighbors, two plainclothes investigators went to the perpetrators' Redlands home on North Center Street for surveillance shortly before 3:00 p.m., about four hours after the initial attack at the Inland Regional Center had begun. They spotted Farook's vehicle leaving the residence and gave chase onto the freeway at 3:08:19 p.m. Officers from other agencies joined the pursuit shortly afterward.

At least one fake explosive‍—‌a metal pipe stuffed with cloth made to resemble a pipe bomb‍—‌was thrown at the police during the pursuit. The SUV exited the freeway onto North Tippecanoe Avenue and briefly stopped at a stoplight, where a pursuing officer observed the perpetrators putting on tactical vests and equipping themselves with rifles. The SUV then continued onward onto East San Bernardino Avenue and entered a suburban area, where the shooter in the backseat, identified as Malik, began firing at police through the back window at 3:08:43 p.m.

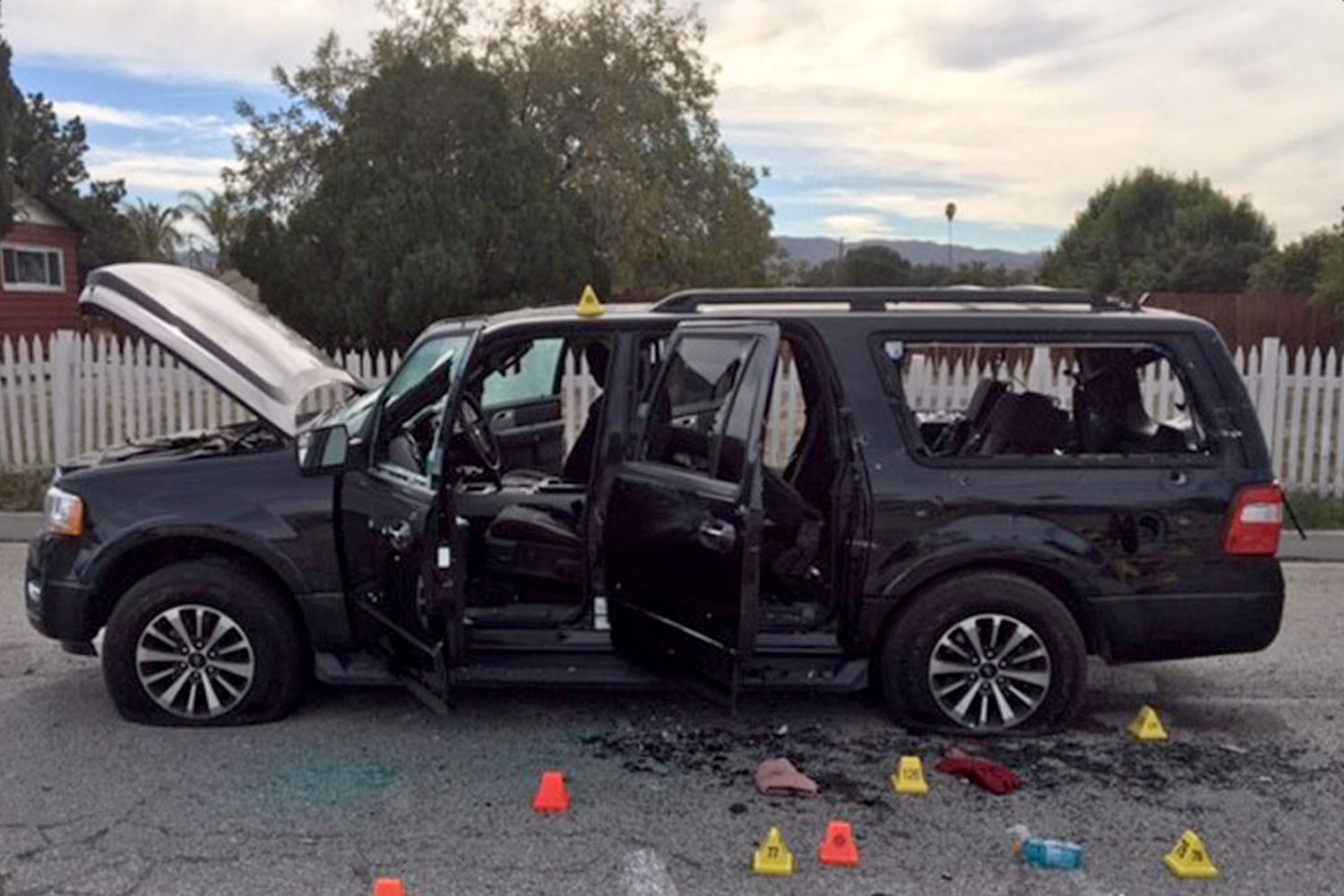
The shooters' Ford Expedition SUV, involved in the shootout Released by the San Bernardino County Sheriff's Department

Eventually, at 3:09:22 p.m., the SUV stopped in a neighborhood about 1.7 miles (2.7 km) away from the scene of the initial attack. The couple continued to exchange fire with police from inside their vehicle. Malik opened the side passenger door and shot at the first police vehicle, which was about 210 feet (64 m) away from the SUV. Farook exited the driver's front door, stood between the two open doors, and opened fire on the same vehicle.

As more officers converged, Farook walked across the street towards some homes while continuing to fire, pinning officers behind their squad cars. He intended to flank the sheriff's deputy who had first stopped. Realizing this, several officers repositioned themselves and focused their gunfire on Farook. One police officer eventually shot Farook in the right side, allowing others to flank and shoot at him. Farook fell to the ground, shot several times in the legs and upper body. He fired at the police once with a handgun as he lay wounded on the ground, injuring an officer before the gun malfunctioned. Farook was shot again several times and killed. His body was handcuffed and positioned to lie face-down afterwards.

Officers then fired on the SUV as Malik continued to shoot at them. During this exchange of gunfire, a second police officer was wounded. Using a police cruiser as cover, officers fired into the back of the SUV while rescuing the wounded officer and a second one. At 3:14:53 p.m., Malik was killed by several bullets that struck her in the body and head.

The gunfire lasted for around five minutes before both perpetrators were killed. Police used BearCat armored personnel carriers in confronting the shooters. Because authorities feared that the vehicle could contain explosives, the "Rook"—a motorized battering ram with a protective shield—was used to investigate the SUV.

The sheriff's department confirmed that a man and a woman were killed. Seven police agencies were involved in the final shootout, with 23 officers firing a combined total of at least 440 rounds. The perpetrators fired at least 81 rounds. During the shootout, police asked residents to stay indoors. Nearly 2,500 rounds of .223-caliber and 9mm ammunition were recovered from the vehicle, along with medical supplies and a trigger apparatus believed to be for the explosives left behind at the Inland Regional Center.

Farook was struck 25 times, Malik was struck 15 times.

== Victims ==
Dead
Name	Age
Robert Adams	40
Isaac Amanios	60
Bennetta Betbadal	46
Harry Bowman	46
Sierra Clayborn	27
Juan Espinoza	50
Aurora Godoy	26
Shannon Johnson	45
Larry Daniel Kaufman	42
Damian Meins	58
Tin Nguyen	31
Nicholas Thalasinos	52
Yvette Velasco	27
Michael Wetzel	37

=== Fatalities ===
In the Inland Regional Center attack, 14 civilians were killed. They ranged in age from 26 to 60. Nine were residents of San Bernardino County, five from nearby Riverside, Los Angeles, and Orange counties. Three (Isaac Amanios, Bennetta Betbadal, and Tin Nguyen‍) were refugees from Eritrea, Iran, and Vietnam, respectively. Thirteen were county employees; ten were environmental health inspectors, comprising about a quarter of that department's workforce.

According to autopsy reports released on May 27, 2016, all died from multiple gunshot wounds, mostly to their backs. Twelve died almost immediately. Shannon Johnson and Bennetta Betbadal later died at a makeshift triage center across the street from the Inland Regional Center.

=== Injured ===
The attack injured 22 civilians, some seriously. Several were hospitalized about 15 minutes after leaving the building. Five went to nearby Loma Linda University Medical Center (Note: Loma Linda University Medical Center is the only Level I trauma center in the region.) and six to Arrowhead Regional Medical Center. (Note: The 22nd injured victim didn't realize at first that she was injured, and later checked herself into a hospital.) The last discharged was from Loma Linda on March 3, 2016.

One police officer was shot during the gunfight, and one was injured by flying glass or shrapnel. Both were struck in the thigh; one realized he was hit thirteen hours later.

== Investigation ==
After the attack, police identified married couple Syed Rizwan Farook and Tashfeen Malik as the perpetrators. They used two illegally transferred .223-caliber semi-automatic rifles which had been modified to defeat California's magazine release requirements, two 9 mm caliber semi-automatic pistols, and an improvised explosive device in the attack. Neither shooter had a criminal record, and neither was on Terrorist Screening Database lists. The New York Times reported that "by all accounts so far, the government had no concrete intelligence warning of the assault," although the federal government has long feared "homegrown, self-radicalized individuals operating undetected before striking one of many soft targets" in the United States.

On December 3, 2015, the FBI took over as the leading federal law enforcement agency on the case, treating the probe as a counter-terrorism investigation. The FBI conducted a "massive" investigation, and by December 7, 2015, had already conducted about 400 interviews and collected about 320 pieces of evidence. On January 5, 2016, the FBI began investigating what the perpetrators' activities were during an 18-minute period from 12:59 p.m. to 1:17 p.m. on the day of the shooting, and they appealed to the public for assistance. Investigators believe that the two were driving around the city in an apparent attempt to remotely detonate the explosive device they left behind at the scene of the attack.

=== Motive ===
The investigation found that the perpetrators were inspired by Islamic terrorists and Islamic terrorist organizations. In Senate Judiciary Committee testimony given on December 9, 2015, FBI Director James B. Comey said that they "were talking to each other about jihad and martyrdom," before their engagement and as early as the end of 2013. They reportedly spent at least a year preparing for the attack, including taking target practice and making plans to take care of their child and Farook's mother. Comey has said that although the investigation has shown that the couple was radicalized and possibly inspired by foreign terrorist organizations, there is no indication that they were directed by such a group or part of a broader cell or network.

On December 16, 2015, Comey said, "We can see from our investigation that in late 2013, before there is a physical meeting of these two people [Farook and Malik] resulting in their engagement and then journey to the United States, they are communicating online, showing signs in that communication of their joint commitment to jihadism and to martyrdom. Those communications are direct, private messages." Comey said that the FBI's investigation had revealed that the perpetrators were "consuming poison on the Internet" and both had become radicalized "before they started courting or dating each other online" and "before the emergence of ISIL." As a result, Comey said that "untangling the motivations of which particular terrorist propaganda motivated in what way remains a challenge in these investigations, and our work is ongoing there."

In one Arabic-language online radio broadcast, ISIL described the perpetrators as "supporters" following the attack. During the police investigation into the attack, The New York Times reported that this language indicated "a less direct connection" between the shooters and the terrorist group. In a December 5, 2015, English-language broadcast on its Bayan radio station, ISIL referred to the couple as "soldiers of the caliphate", which is a phrase ISIL uses to denote members of the terrorist organization. The New York Times reported that it was unclear why the two versions differed.

On December 1, 2016, nearly one year after the attack, authorities speculated on Farook's forced participation in the training event and Christmas party as the trigger. Newly discovered emails indicated that Malik had objected to the party and did not want her husband to participate. San Bernardino Police Chief Jarrod Burguan said in an interview with ABC News that Malik stated that "she didn't think that a Muslim should have to participate in a non-Muslim holiday or event" in an online account.

=== Searches ===
After the deaths of the perpetrators, the focus shifted to a small townhouse in Redlands, a few miles away from San Bernardino; the place where Farook and Malik met after the shooting and where they lived. By 6:00 p.m. PST on December 2, 2015, police were executing a search warrant on the house. According to the San Bernardino police chief, Farook and Malik were listed in the rental agreement. Police used robots to search the house. Investigators found 2,000 9-mm handgun rounds, 2,500 .223-caliber rounds, and the tools that could be used to make improvised explosive devices. The FBI also initially reported that it had removed twelve pipe bombs from the perpetrators' home; the FBI clarified several days later that it had recovered 19 types of pipes that could be converted into bombs from the home.

The Bureau of Alcohol, Tobacco, Firearms and Explosives (ATF) was able to complete an "urgent trace" on the firearms less than two hours after the guns were recovered.

The couple was not completely successful in destroying their personal electronics, including mobile phones and hard drives, prior to the attack.

Pursuant to a federal search warrant, the authorities also searched a townhouse in Corona twice, where Farook's brother and father lived. The FBI said that the family was cooperating and authorities did not arrest anyone.

On December 10, 2015, federal authorities began searching Seccombe Lake park in downtown San Bernardino after receiving a tip that the shooters visited the area on the day of the attack. A dive team was sent into the shallow edge of the lake to search for evidence; nothing relevant was found.

==== Media reporters enter shooters' home ====
After the FBI completed a search of the perpetrators' townhouse, it was turned over to its landlord. On December 4, 2015, the landlord used a crowbar to open the door to the home and allowed reporters and photographers to "swarm" the home. (Note: CNN's Anderson Cooper called the scene "bizarre" during the network's live broadcast.) NBC News correspondent Kerry Sanders said that Inside Edition paid the building's landlord US$1,000 to access the home. MSNBC, CNN, and Fox News all broadcast live video from the home, showing images of personal photographs, documents, identification cards, and baby items.

The scene was described as having a "media circus" atmosphere. Sanders, in particular, was criticized for showing close-up images of children's photographs and Farook's mother's identification card; the network later said it regretted doing so. According to legal experts, the broadcast was not illegal, but it raised concerns about journalistic ethics. The Washington Post media critic Erik Wemple wrote that the media's behavior was "terrible" and opined that "this was a story poorly suited to live coverage, without the time and ability to document a scene, determine what's relevant and provide the filtered product to readers." Al Tompkins of the Poynter Institute for Media Studies said that the decision to enter the apartment was "ludicrous" and critiqued the "callous and competitive behavior" of the media on a grave story.

==== Phone decryption ====
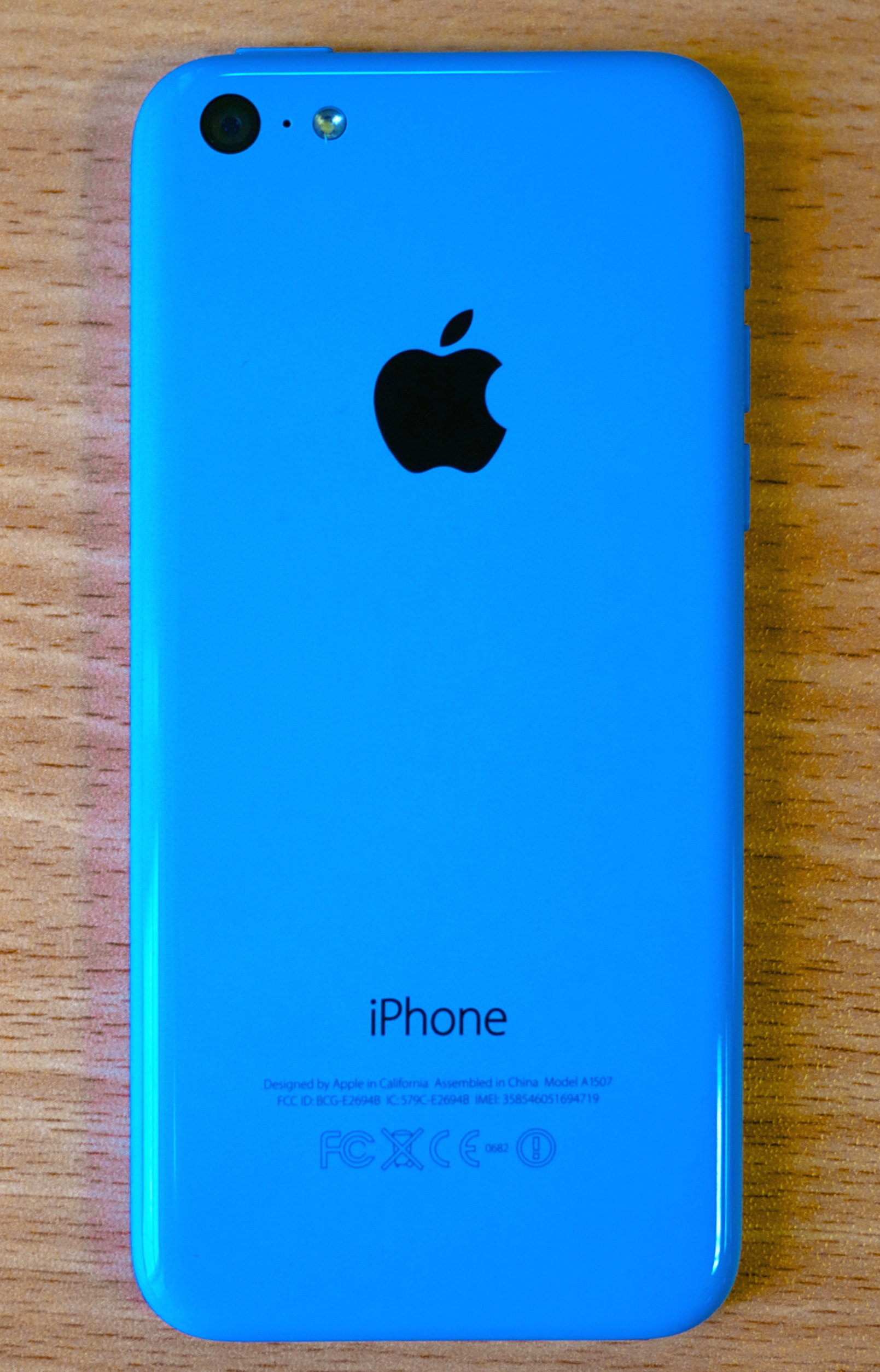
An iPhone 5C, the model used by one of the shooters

On February 9, 2016, the FBI announced that it was unable to unlock one of the mobile phones they had recovered because of the phone's advanced security features. The phone was an iPhone 5C owned by the county and issued to its employee, the shooter Farook. The FBI first asked the National Security Agency to break into the phone, but the NSA was unable to do so. As a result, the FBI asked Apple Inc. to create a new version of the phone's iOS operating system that could be installed and run in the phone's random access memory to disable certain security features. Apple declined due to its policy to never undermine the security features of its products. The FBI responded by successfully applying to a United States magistrate judge, Sherri Pym, to issue a court order, mandating Apple to create and provide the requested software. The order was not a subpoena, but rather was issued under the All Writs Act of 1789.

Apple announced their intent to oppose the order, citing the security risks that the creation of a backdoor would pose towards its customers. It also stated that no government had ever asked for similar access. The company was given until February 26, 2016, to fully respond to the court order.

In response to the opposition, on February 19, 2016, the U.S. Department of Justice filed a new application urging a federal judge to compel Apple to comply with the order. The new application stated that the company could install the malware on the phone in its own premises, and after the FBI had hacked the phone via remote connection, Apple could remove and destroy the malware.

The same day, Apple revealed that it had discussed with the FBI four methods to access data in the iPhone in early January, but one of the more promising methods was ruled out by a mistake during the investigation of the attack. After the shooter's phone had been recovered, the FBI asked San Bernardino County, the owner of the phone, to reset the password to the shooter's iCloud account in order to acquire data from the iCloud backup. However, this rendered the phone unable to back up recent data to iCloud unless its passcode is entered. This was confirmed by the Department of Justice, which then added that any backup would have been "insufficient" because they would not have been able to recover enough information from it.

The San Bernardino County District Attorney, Michael Ramos, filed a brief claiming the iPhone may contain evidence of a possible third shooter and a "dormant cyber pathogen" that could have been introduced into the San Bernardino County computer network.

On March 28, the Department of Justice announced that it had unlocked the iPhone and withdrew its suit. Initial reports, citing anonymous sources, stated that Israeli company Cellebrite was assisting the FBI with this alternative. However, The Washington Post, citing anonymous sources, reported that the FBI instead paid "professional hackers" who used a zero-day vulnerability in the iPhone's software to bypass its ten-try limitation, and did not need Cellebrite's assistance. In April 2021, The Washington Post reported that the Australian company Azimuth Security, a white hat hacking firm, had been the one to help the FBI.

In September 2016, the Associated Press, Vice Media, and Gannett (the owner of USA Today) filed a Freedom of Information Act (FOIA) lawsuit against the FBI, seeking to compel the agency to reveal who it hired to unlock Farook's iPhone, and how much was paid. On September 30, 2017, a federal court ruled against the media organizations and granted summary judgment in the government's favor. The court ruled that the company that hacked the iPhone and the amount paid to it by the FBI were national security secrets and "intelligence sources or methods" that are exempt from disclosure under FOIA; the court additionally ruled that the amount paid "reflects a confidential law enforcement technique or procedure" that also falls under a FOIA exemption.

National reactions to Apple's opposition of the order were mixed. A CBS News poll that sampled 1,022 Americans found that 50% of the respondents supported the FBI's stance, while 45% supported Apple's stance.

In March 2018, the Los Angeles Times reported that "the FBI eventually found that Farook's phone had information only about work and revealed nothing about the plot."

=== Possibility of third shooter ===
Initial news reports and witness accounts following the attack led to a search for up to three shooters, but police eventually determined that there were only two since only two firearms were used in the attack according to ballistics evidence.

Immediately following the shootout that killed the perpetrators, investigators in armored vehicles at the perpetrators' townhouse considered ordering an evacuation, but instead ordered the neighborhood to shelter in place and cordoned off the area. From 4:00 p.m. to 5:30 p.m., police asked residents of the area to stay in their homes with doors locked and secure after residents reported a person jumping fences. No one was found; the reports may have been from officers at the scene. A person detained after running away from the scene of the shootout was thought to be a possible third suspect, but police determined that he was not connected to the shooting; the person was booked on an unrelated outstanding misdemeanor warrant.

On February 18, 2016, the FBI revealed that they have not ruled out the possibility of a third shooter, but clarified that they are continuing to operate under the assumption that only two shooters were involved. Some witnesses who claimed to have seen three gunmen at the Inland Regional Center continued to assert their accounts. As of December 1, 2016, it was reported that the FBI had yet to rule out that possibility.

== Related arrests and prosecutions ==
=== Enrique Marquez Jr. ===
Enrique Marquez Jr., a next-door neighbor of Farook's until May 2015, and who is connected to him by an immigration fraud sham marriage, was investigated in connection with his purchase of the two rifles used in the attack, a charge to which he agreed to plead guilty. There is no record of a transfer of the weapons from Marquez to the attackers.

==== Personal background ====
Marquez converted to Islam in 2007. Though not regularly, Marquez attended both the Islamic Center of Riverside and the Islamic Society of Corona-Norco four or five years before the attack, and stood out because of his Hispanic background.

Federal prosecutors allege that in 2011, Farook and Marquez conspired to carry out shooting and bombing attacks at the library or cafeteria at Riverside Community College, where both were students, and on rush-hour traffic on California State Route 91 in Corona. Marquez reportedly told authorities that he and Farook tried to carry out the attack in 2011 or 2012. This plan was abandoned after three men in the Inland Empire were arrested for their plan to kill Americans in Afghanistan. Though the FBI had previously disputed this fact, Marquez was found to have ties to these men in 2016.

By 2011, Marquez spent most of his time in Farook's home, listening to, watching, and reading radical Islamist propaganda, including Inspire magazine, the official publication of Al-Qaeda in the Arabian Peninsula (AQAP), and videos produced by Al-Shabaab as well as the sermons of Anwar al-Awlaki.

On November 29, 2014, Marquez entered into a sham marriage with Mariya Chernykh, a Russian woman who arrived in the U.S. on a J-1 visa and the sister of the wife of Farook's older brother. According to The New York Times, Marquez was said to have been paid between $5,000 and $10,000 to enter the green card marriage so that Chernykh could become a U.S. citizen.

Early on December 5, 2015, federal authorities searched Marquez's Riverside home under a federal search warrant. He waived his Miranda rights and cooperated "extensively" with federal investigators, "discussing at length his relationship with" Farook.

==== Arrest and legal proceedings ====
On December 17, 2015, Marquez was arrested and charged in the U.S. District Court for the Central District of California with three federal criminal counts: conspiracy to provide material support for terrorism (i.e., himself, a firearm, and explosives); making a false statement in connection with acquisition of firearms ("straw purchase"); and immigration fraud. Another "straw purchase"-related charge and another immigration fraud charge were added on December 30, 2015. He faced a maximum of 50 years in prison if convicted on all of the charges. The court ordered Marquez held without bail, saying that Marquez would pose a danger to the community if released.

Marquez initially pleaded not guilty to all of the charges against him. On April 28, 2016, he was named in an indictment as a co-conspirator in document fraud in relation to the arrest of Mariya Chernynk. In February 2017, as part of a plea agreement with federal prosecutors, Marquez pleaded guilty to conspiracy to provide material support to terrorists and to making false statements in connection with the purchase of a firearm. Marquez also admitted to plotting with Farook the alleged abandoned terror plots in 2011. As part of the plea agreement, the government agreed to dismiss the marriage fraud charges.

The maximum sentence is 25 years in prison plus a $500,000 fine. Testifying in court when Marquez's guilty plea was entered, the father of one of the victims denounced the plea agreement, saying that it would lead to a sentence that was too light; the U.S. Attorney explained that while he understood the father's pain, the government did not have enough sufficient evidence to prosecute Marquez for more serious offenses.

The sentencing hearing was initially set for November 6, 2017, but it was postponed to February 26, 2018, four days before. Sentencing was postponed indefinitely on June 26, 2018, after Marquez obtained a new attorney. On October 23, 2020, Marquez was sentenced to 20 years in prison.

=== Raheel Farook, Tatiana Farook, and Mariya Chernykh ===
Syed Raheel Farook, the brother of gunman Rizwan Farook, 31; his wife Tatiana Farook, 31; and her sister Mariya Chernykh, who was Marquez's "wife" in the sham marriage, were all subject to an investigation into Chernykh's sham marriage with Marquez, which arose during the investigation into the attack.

==== Personal backgrounds ====
Raheel Farook served in the U.S. Navy in the Iraq War from 2003 to 2007, and was awarded two medals for service during the war on terror. He was described by friends and neighbors as sociable and extroverted compared with his brother Rizwan. In 2011, he married Tatiana, a Russian citizen who immigrated to the U.S. in 2003 from her home village of Vysokiy, located 400 miles (640 km) from Moscow.

Tatiana had first settled into Richmond, Virginia, immediately after arriving into the U.S. on a J-1 visa. There, she married another man, but the couple divorced in 2010 and Tatiana moved to southern California, where she met Raheel. In California, she began launching several businesses, including a kiosk in The Shops at Montebello, a shopping mall.

Mariya Chernykh, the younger sister of Tatiana Farook and also from the village of Vysokiy, left Russia and entered the U.S. on a J-1 visa in July 2009 and failed to depart on October 30 of the same year as required by her visa. At some point since her arrival in the U.S., she made an application for asylum, though it is currently unknown if it was ruled on. She dated a Los Angeles man for years and had a child with him, but were forced to split up due to the sham marriage. On November 29, 2014, Chernykh entered into a sham marriage with Marquez in order to gain legal status in the U.S. According to The Los Angeles Times, after the sham marriage, Chernykh struggled to play her part; on Christmas 2014, she was urged by Tatiana to stop posting online photos of herself with her ex-boyfriend. She began working with her sister as a saleswoman at her sister's kiosk. In January 2017, she pled guilty to immigration fraud.

In late 2015, Chernykh and Marquez were set to be interviewed by immigration officials. As a result, according to the indictment, Raheel Farook created a fraudulent back-dated lease agreement that claimed the two were living with him and his wife since their marriage. Raheel and Tatiana Farook also allegedly staged family photos of Chernykh and Marquez, and established a joint transaction account for them. Prosecutors allege that on December 3, the day after the Inland Regional Center attack, Tatiana Farook lied to investigators about Chernykh and Marquez's marriage.

On February 18, 2016, the FBI searched a residence belonging to Raheel Farook, but did not comment on the exact nature of the search. Raheel was not arrested or named a suspect at that time.

==== Arrests and legal proceedings ====
On April 28, 2016, the Farooks and Chernykh were arrested and charged with conspiracy to knowingly make false statements under oath with respect to immigration documents. These charges carry a maximum sentence of five years.

All three pleaded not guilty to the charges against them in a federal court in Riverside. Raheel Farook's mother and Chernykh's ex-boyfriend agreed to post their bails.

The day following her arrest, Chernykh posted her bail, but she was transferred to the custody of the U.S. Immigration and Customs Enforcement by the U.S. Marshals Service and is being held at Adelanto Detention Center. Deportation proceedings against her are pending, but are on hold until the criminal case is resolved.

U.S. Attorney Eileen Decker issued a statement, saying that the charges arose from the investigation into the attack. The indictment alleged that Chernykh paid Marquez to enter into a sham marriage to obtain U.S. immigration benefits. The U.S. Attorney's Office said in a statement that Raheel and Tatiana Farook conspired in the sham marriage by "witnessing Marquez and Chernykh's wedding, taking staged family pictures of Marquez and Chernykh, establishing a joint checking account for the couple and creating a back-dated lease for Marquez and Chernykh to create the illusion that they shared a marital residence."

Chernykh pleaded guilty to conspiracy, perjury, and two counts of making false statements. While she faced up to 20 years in prison, on May 17, 2021, she was sentenced to three years probation, serving no jail time, and her Russian passport was returned to her by the court.

In January 2017, Raheel Farook pleaded guilty to one felony count of conspiracy to commit immigration fraud, arising from his making of a false statement in support of Chernykh's application for permanent residency. The following month, Tatiana Farook pleaded guilty to the same crime. The maximum sentence in both cases is five years in prison, three years of supervised release, and a $250,000 fine.

Both were initially set to be sentenced on November 13, 2017, but this was postponed to March 19, 2018, three days before. Both were later sentenced to three years of probation.

=== Rafia Sultana Shareef (Rafia Farook) ===
In March 2020, Rafia Sultana Shareef, the mother of Syed Rizwan Farook and Syed Raheel Farook, pleaded guilty to one count of destroying evidence, becoming the only person prosecuted for a crime directly related to the December 2015 terrorist attack. Assistant U.S. Attorney Julius Nam argued, "The defendant chose to deliberately destroy a document that was central to the understanding of the planning". The FBI recovered what prosecutors called the "attack plan" from a shredder in Raheel Farook's home in Corona and reconstructed it using a computer and scanner, according to Assistant U.S. Attorney Christopher Grigg.

Prosecutors did not allege in court that Shareef, who shared a townhouse with Farook and Malik, knew in advance about the terrorists' plans, but in a statement on March 3, 2020, said, "Shareef admitted that she knew her son had produced the document, and she believed it was directly related to his planning of the IRC attack." The "attack plan" included a diagram of the Inland Regional Center conference room and a pathway for the shooters to take between the tables. It also listed action items such as practicing at a shooting range, destroying electronics that authorities could use for tracking, purchasing parts to construct IEDs, and transferring funds to Shareef's bank account.

On February 11, 2021, U.S. District Court Judge Jesus G. Bernal sentenced Shareef to six months of home confinement and three years of probation. While the maximum sentence had been 20 years in federal prison, under her plea agreement she faced at most 18 months in custody. Prior to sentencing, Shareef apologized to the handful of victims and survivors who were in the Riverside courthouse gallery, saying, "I pray for each of your family members" and to the judge, saying, "I am sorry for what I did."

== Aftermath ==
=== Emergency response discussion ===
On March 18, 2016, California State Assemblyman Freddie Rodriguez of the Joint Legislative Committee on Emergency Management conducted a hearing in which first responders were to share details of the response to the attack and possible aspects that could be improved on. During the hearing, Michael Madden, a lieutenant with the San Bernardino Police Department and one of the first responders to respond to the Inland Regional Center, requested state aid in encrypting police radio channels. He explained that police communications were playing out real-time across the U.S. during the attack, being broadcast on YouTube and other network systems. According to Madden, this put first responders at risk, as potential suspects could have been monitoring the communications and tracking the actions of law enforcement. He added that the City of San Bernardino, as well as San Bernardino County, were moving towards a radio system that will incorporate encrypted frequencies.

=== Gun control discussion ===
President Barack Obama called for "common sense" gun safety laws and stronger background checks as part of a bipartisan effort to reduce the frequency of such shootings. In an interview with CBS News' Norah O'Donnell, Obama said, "We have a pattern now of mass shootings in this country that has no parallel anywhere else in the world." Obama called for legislation to block people on the anti-terrorism No Fly List from purchasing weapons. Speaker of the House Paul Ryan opposed this proposal, saying that denying persons on the list the right to bear arms would violate their due process rights.

After the shooting, some Democrats sought to tighten federal gun control regulations, "laying blame on a culture that allows even people who are not permitted to board airplanes to buy guns with ease," while some Republicans criticized what they believe to be "the Obama administration's unwillingness to come to terms with the true threat posed by Muslim extremists." Members of the California State Legislature also proposed to revisit some gun-control proposals that had previously stalled, with one assemblyman proposing a prohibition of the sale of guns to those on the federal No Fly List. On January 8, 2016, Representative Pete Aguilar of Redlands spoke on the floor of the House of Representatives and called for gun control. After the shooting, gun sales in California increased by more than 18,000, following an overall down year for statewide sales. Applications for concealed carry permits also rose 750 percent in San Bernardino County.

The families of the shooting victims reacted to President Obama's executive action to tighten gun regulation and expand background checks. A number of family members expressed support for the plans as necessary and long overdue, while a few doubted whether they would reduce gun violence.

Prior to the attack, a measure was sponsored by Senator Dianne Feinstein; it would allow the U.S. to ban sales of guns and explosives to people listed on government watch lists of suspected terrorists. The so-called "Feinstein Amendment" came to the Senate floor one day after the attack, but failed on a party-line vote, with Democrats in favor and Republicans opposed. On June 16, 2016, Tina Meins, the daughter of one of the fourteen people killed in the attack, spoke in a press conference arranged by Connecticut Senator Chris Murphy, just a day after Murphy launched a fifteen-hour filibuster on the U.S. Senate floor, regarding federal gun control legislation. In the press conference, Meins asserted her support for gun control and questioned the Senate's vote against the Feinstein Amendment, explaining that more than 2,000 terror suspects were able to purchase firearms since 2004.

The New York Times published a front-page editorial, the first in 95 years, which called for gun-control measures. The Times editorial board wrote: "It is a moral outrage and a national disgrace that civilians can legally purchase weapons designed specifically to kill people with brutal speed and efficiency." Arthur O. Sulzberger, Jr., publisher of the Times, said the placement of the editorial on the front page was "to deliver a strong and visible statement of frustration and anguish about our country's inability to come to terms with the scourge of guns."

On April 20, 2016, California state lawmakers gave initial approval to five gun control bills, which outlawed assault weapons with detachable magazines, prohibited the sale of rifles with the "bullet button" device, banned possession of magazines holding more than ten rounds, required the collection of information on people intending to buy ammunition for any kind of firearm, and required improvised firearms to be registered with the state and given a serial number. The measures have been opposed by a number of politicians and gun rights organizations such as the National Rifle Association and Gun Owners of California. Some of the bills were approved by Governor Brown on July 1, 2016, and went into effect in 2017.

=== Lawsuits ===
On January 13, 2016, the wife of one of the slain victims filed wrongful death claims against San Bernardino County and dozens of unidentified individuals, and also sought damages totaling $58 million, saying that her husband's death was preventable and caused by negligence. On January 22, 2016, three relatives of another slain victim filed identical claims against the county for similar reasons and also claimed that the county fostered a hostile workplace environment and failed to provide safety to the Inland Regional Center's employees. The three relatives sought for a total of $204 million.

At least five San Bernardino city residents filed claims with the City of San Bernardino seeking reimbursement for least $12,000 in property damage caused by bullets in the shootout, which hit a resident's truck and other items; the city council voted 5–2 to deny the claims. The city police were one of seven law enforcement agencies on the scene, and it is uncertain which agency fired what bullets.

On May 31, 2016, federal prosecutors filed a lawsuit against Farook's family. This lawsuit would allow them to seize both the proceeds of two life insurance policies (and the policies themselves) held by Farook, both of which listed Farook's mother as the beneficiary. One policy worth $25,000 was taken out by Farook in 2012 when he started working for the county, while the other, worth $250,000, was taken out the following year. According to NBC News, "Under federal law, assets derived from terrorism are subject to forfeiture. A federal judge must approve an application before the government can seize the money." In the six-page lawsuit, the life insurance company claimed that Farook's mother was aware of her son's intentions to carry out the attack, and reasoned that she should not be entitled to the benefits as a result. On September 2, 2016, government officials said they wanted to give the money to the victims' families. In December 2022, The Press-Enterprise reported the insurance company had paid the claims, but the money was being held by the court pending resolution of the case.

=== Planned memorial ===
On May 5, 2016, a group created by San Bernardino County announced plans for a memorial dedicated to the victims and survivors of the attack, as well as the first responders involved. Details about the design of the memorial, meant to be a fountain and garden, were released on the next day. Groundbreaking was slated to begin on June 2, the six-month anniversary of the attack. As of 2017, however, the memorial was still in the development stage. Such memorials usually take five to ten years to be completed.

=== Threats against schools ===
Hours after the attack, classes were canceled at California State University, San Bernardino and at Loma Linda University following a bomb threat that was called in to the university's medical center, where many injured victims were being treated.

On December 15, after the Los Angeles Unified School District received a threat of attack by "explosive devices" and other means, Superintendent of Schools Ramon Cortines ordered the closure of all schools in the district for the day. Cortines cited the San Bernardino incident as an influence in his decision to close the schools. New York City received the same threat, but the New York City Department of Education determined it was a hoax and took no action.

=== Release of after-action report ===
On September 9, 2016, the Police Foundation and the U.S. Department of Justice's Office of Community Oriented Policing Services (COPS Office) released a review of law enforcement response to the attack. The review provided a detailed overview of the incident response; lessons learned to improve responding agencies' policies, procedures, tactics, systems, culture, and relationships; and guidance to other agencies and first responders as they prepare for responses to terrorist, active shooter, or other hostile events, and mass-casualty incidents.

=== Survivors ===
On the one-year anniversary of the attack, it was reported that a number of survivors were accusing San Bernardino County of cutting off support for them. This included a lack of access to counseling or antidepressant medication, the injured attempting to get surgeries approved and physical therapy covered, a lack of assistance in dealing with a complex workers' compensation program, and health insurers refusing to cover injuries because they occurred during an act of workplace violence. A county spokesman denied the accusations and said, "The county is, and always has been, committed to ensuring our employees get all the care they need."

=== Anniversary commemoration events ===
On the first anniversary of the attack, a bicycle ride hosted by the Redlands-based club "Ride Yourself Fit" was held at 7:30 a.m.; dozens of local bicyclists, many of them police officers, rode 14 miles (23 km), with one mile representing each person killed in the attack. The remembrance bicycle ride continues to be held every December 2. A remembrance ceremony was held at a local blood bank at 8:00 a.m. Later that morning, over 200 people at the Inland Regional Center held a moment of silence outside the building. At 3:30 p.m., a "Peace Garden" was opened on the campus of California State University, San Bernardino; it was dedicated in the memory of five of the victims, who were all alumni of the university.

== Reactions ==
=== Local and county reactions ===
Following the attack, county offices, including the Department of Public Health, were closed the remainder of the week, with only the most essential services remaining open. Most of the county's 20,000 employees returned to work on December 7, 2015, though Inland Regional Center personnel worked remotely. The Inland Regional Center remained closed until January 4, 2016. Its two main buildings now operated under heightened security; the building where the attack took place will remain closed indefinitely. The location of a planned train station next to the center was moved eastward due in part to the center's new security procedures.

The City of San Bernardino incurred up to US$1 million in unforeseen expenses (such as the deployment of more police officers on extended shifts) as a result of the attack, and planned to seek state and federal emergency funds to help cover the costs.

California governor Jerry Brown declared a state of emergency in San Bernardino County, since roughly 35 percent of the Department of Public Health employees were among those killed or wounded in the attack, and the attack left the county with very few health inspectors to do critical work. The emergency declaration will allow the state of California to send in additional health inspectors for assistance. On March 22, 2016, San Bernardino County unanimously voted to accept a US$1.5 million agreement with the California Association of Environmental Health Administrators to provide up to 30 temporary health inspectors to replace those currently on leave. As of May 29, 2016, 50 percent of county environmental health staff remain on leave, and temporary staff remain on loan from Riverside, Orange, Los Angeles, Contra Costa, Marin, Ventura, and San Luis Obispo Counties.

About 2,000 local residents gathered at a candlelight vigil at San Manuel Stadium in downtown San Bernardino the day after the attack. At the vigil, Mayor R. Carey Davis praised the first responders, said that the tragedy "has forever impacted our community," and talked about how the community had come together following the attack. Five of the victims and one of the killers were graduates of California State University, San Bernardino; on December 8, 2015, more than 1,000 students, alumni, and community members attended a candlelight vigil on campus in honor of the victims. On January 4, 2016, a memorial for the slain victims was held at the Citizens Business Bank Arena in nearby Ontario, with thousands in attendance, including Governor Brown, California Attorney General Kamala Harris, former New York City mayor Rudy Giuliani, and Christian pastor Rick Warren.

After the attack, a relief fund for San Bernardino was set up and has raised US$2.48 million as of March 3, 2016. On July 5, 2016, the relief fund finished distributing the entirety of its raised money to the families of the deceased victims (which all received 80 percent of the funds), the 22 people injured (who received 15.5 percent), and witnesses to the shooting (who received 4.5 percent). There were 75 named recipients in total, though the two police officers injured in the shootout with the perpetrators declined their share of the compensation.

=== Nationwide reactions ===
President Barack Obama ordered U.S. flags to be flown at half-staff at the White House, public buildings, military installations, Navy ships, embassies, and diplomatic missions. On December 18, 2015, President Obama and First Lady Michelle Obama met in San Bernardino with families of the fatal victims, and emergency personnel who first responded to the incident.

The governors of several states also ordered flags to be lowered to half-staff in their states as well. In California, the annual Christmas tree lighting ceremony at the State Capitol was canceled and all flags were lowered to half-staff.

Twelve of the dead were members of the Service Employees International Union; SEIU international president Mary Kay Henry said, "Our hearts are broken from this tragedy. ... We will unite to demand that our nation does everything possible to ensure that no more families have to feel this pain, sadness and loss ever again."

=== Muslim reactions ===
American Muslim organizations, including Council on American–Islamic Relations (CAIR) and Islamic Society of Orange County, condemned the attacks. A night vigil was held the day after the attacks at the largest mosque in the San Bernardino County, the Ahmadiyya Baitul Hameed Mosque.

In the aftermath of the shooting, CAIR reported an escalation in anti-Muslim hate crimes in the U.S., including the throwing of a pig's head at a mosque in Philadelphia, the beating of a Queens shop owner, and incidents of death threats and vandalism. A number of attacks and incidents of vandalism in southern California in the weeks following the attack were investigated as anti-Muslim hate crimes.

A "Muslims United for San Bernardino" campaign to raise money to assist victims' families with funeral expenses and other needs raised more than US$152,000 from more than 1,000 donors, becoming the most successful crowdfunding venture Muslim Americans have ever launched.

On December 15, 2015, three senior White House officials‍—‌Valerie Jarrett, Cecilia Muñoz, and Ben Rhodes‍—‌met with American Muslim and Sikh leaders to discuss the increase in violent attacks upon members of the American Muslim and Sikh community following the attack (Sikhs are not Muslims but have been occasionally targeted in anti-Islamic bias-motivated crimes).

On January 19, 2016, Dabiq, the online propaganda magazine of the Islamic State of Iraq and the Levant, released an issue praising the shooting and the perpetrators.

=== Political reactions ===
Governor Brown said, "Our thoughts and prayers are with the victims' families and everyone affected by the brutal attack." On September 12, 2016, Brown and California Attorney General Kamala Harris awarded eight police officers the Medal of Valor for their roles in emergency response during the attack and the subsequent shootout with the perpetrators.

Pakistani interior minister Chaudhry Nisar Ali Khan said the Pakistani government will continue to offer "all possible legal assistance" to the U.S. in the investigation, and that:

[No] sane Pakistani or Muslim could even think about doing such acts, and only few people are using the name of Islam for their wrongdoings, which is defaming our religion. Such heinous acts also lead to serious difficulties for millions of Muslims who live in Western and other countries, and the extremists and nationalist elements in those societies look at Muslims with suspicions. Islamophobia is being spread around the world. What the terrorists are doing has nothing to do with Islam.

In an address to the nation delivered from the Oval Office on December 6, 2015, President Obama declared the shooting an act of terrorism, referring to the shooters as having "gone down the dark path of radicalization" and embracing a "perverted version of Islam". Obama said that "the threat from terrorism is real, but we will overcome it" and promised that the United States will "destroy ISIL and any other organization that tries to harm us." Obama also outlined the ongoing fight against ISIL (including U.S. airstrikes, financial sanctions, and targeted special operations) and urged Americans to not give in to fear. It was just the third speech from the Oval Office in the seven years of Obama's presidency.

Many Republican U.S. presidential candidates at the time, among them Marco Rubio, Ted Cruz, and Donald Trump, responded by claiming the United States was at war. Chris Christie, who was campaigning in Iowa at the time, declared, "What the fact is this is a new world war and one that won't look like the last two. And this is one where it's radical Islamic jihadists everyday are trying to kill Americans and disrupt and destroy our way of life." Jeb Bush stated, "If this is a war, and I believe it is since they have declared war on us, we need to declare war on them."

In the New York Review of Books, Wyatt Mason observed that a mass shooting at a Colorado Springs Planned Parenthood clinic, committed by a devout Christian a week earlier, did not lead to the kind of rhetorical outpouring produced by the San Bernardino attack, and argued that the difference in response suggested racism was at work.

Some Muslim leaders objected to Obama's request that American Muslims help to "root out" extremism in their communities. Palestinian-American activist Linda Sarsour commented, "I'm tired of this idea that extremism can only mean Muslims or Islam or people who are associated with Islam ... why is it that we're only obsessed with Islam and Muslim communities?". "We would never ask any other faith community to stand up and condemn acts of violence committed by people within their groups", she said.

On June 18, 2016, President Obama issued a Weekly Address addressing the San Bernardino attack and a mass shooting that occurred at a gay nightclub six days earlier. In the speech, he addressed the topics of homegrown terrorism and gun control.

Being tough on terrorism, particularly the sorts of homegrown terrorism that we've seen now in Orlando and San Bernardino, means making it harder for people who want to kill Americans to get their hands on assault weapons that are capable of killing dozens of innocents as quickly as possible. That's something I'll continue to talk about in the weeks ahead.

==== Controversies ====
In response to the shooting, then-candidate Donald Trump called for a "total and complete" ban on Muslims entering the United States "until our country's representatives can figure out what is going on." Trump's statement drew widespread condemnation, including from the White House, the Pentagon, the United Nations, and foreign leaders such as British prime minister David Cameron and French prime minister Manuel Valls. Trump's suggestion was met with condemnation from both Democratic and Republican candidates for the presidency in 2016. Trump, in an interview on Good Morning America, cited the internment of Japanese Americans, German Americans, and Italian Americans during World War II as precedent for his proposal.

The attack reignited the debate over whether U.S. government should expand electronic surveillance of Americans, and specifically whether Congress should adopt legislation mandating that technology companies provide a backdoor so that law enforcement has access to encrypted communication. Technology companies oppose such legislation, arguing that it would unacceptably undermine security. At a December 9, 2015, hearing before the Senate Judiciary Committee, FBI Director Comey called upon tech companies offering end-to-end encryption (such as Apple) to revise their "business model". There is no evidence that the shooters in San Bernardino used encrypted communications, although Comey said the attackers in the Curtis Culwell Center attack earlier the same year exchanged encrypted text messages. Senators Richard Burr and Dianne Feinstein, the chairman and ranking member, respectively, of the Senate Intelligence Committee, are working on encryption legislation. Additionally, Feinstein reintroduced legislation that would require tech companies to report "knowledge of any terrorist activity" they become aware of, a measure that worried Silicon Valley technology companies, which object to such measures on privacy grounds.

The use of BearCat armored vehicles by police during the shootout revived debate over use of military and military-style equipment by police, with some law-enforcement officials saying that the shooting showed a need for police to acquire such equipment.

== See also ==
- List of homicides in California
- Gun violence in the United States
- Gun law in the United States
- Gun politics in the United States
- Mass shootings in the United States
- List of rampage killers (religious, political, or ethnic crimes)
- Islamic terrorism
- 2009 Fort Hood shooting
- 2015 Chattanooga shootings
- Orlando nightclub shooting
- Curtis Culwell Center attack
- List of terrorist incidents, 2015
- 2017 North Park Elementary School shooting
