= Al-Huda International =

Al-Huda Institute is an Islamic institute that follows the teaching from what it considers to be the authentic sources of the Quran and the Sunnah. The organization runs chain of religious schools, with campuses in Islamabad and Karachi, Pakistan, as well as in Mississauga, Ontario, Canada.

== Ideology ==
Al-Huda Institute's founder, Farhat Hashimi, stated that it does not follow any particular sect of contemporary Islam and that it refers to itself simply as Muslims, as was done during the time of early Islam.

The institute is known for its extensive religious syllabus with a focus on scripture. According to Faiza Mushtaq, who did her PhD on the institute, its schools produce "activists and reformers," who believe that they are returning to "'real Islam, true and pure." According to Sadaf Ahmad of Lahore University, "Al Huda founder Farhat Hashmi's denunciation of various cultural practices and disapproval of Westerners and Indians gives women a new conception of their identity as Muslims."

== Canadian branch ==
Al-Huda's Mississauga campus opened in 2004 and is a private school accredited by the Ontario Ministry of Education. As of 2015, it offered two main fields of study. About 160 female students in kindergarten to Grade 6 attended daily classes. On evenings and weekends, the school offers seminars for teenagers and adults.

== Students linked to terror groups ==
Tashfeen Malik, a Pakistani co-perpetrator of the December 2, 2015 shooting attack in San Bernardino, California, which killed 14 and seriously injured 22 people, had been a student of al-Huda before she married and moved to California. She and her husband executed the worst Islamic terror attack in the United States since the September 11 attacks in 2001.

Four Canadian female students, ranging from sixteen to the early twenties, attended seminars at the Mississauga branch between about 2013 to 2015. They then traveled to the Middle East to join ISIL in Syria. The oldest woman attended the school for three months in 2012 and, according to an interview that her sister gave CBC News, had been living in Syria since summer 2014. In July 2014, the three younger girls were intercepted by security personal in Turkey and sent back to Canada before they could reach ISIL territory.

== Notable alumni ==
- Tashfeen Malik – Islamic terrorist who was one of the perpetrators of the 2015 San Bernardino attack in which 14 people were killed
