= Islamic Center of Riverside =

Mosque in California, the United States

Coordinates: 33.97892°N 117.33444°W

Religion
- Affiliation: Islam
- Branch/tradition: Sunni
- Ecclesiastical or organizational status: non-profit religious organization

Location
- Location: 1038 West Linden Street, Riverside, California 92507
- Interactive map of Islamic Center of Riverside

Architecture
- Type: Mosque
- Established: 1979
- Capacity: 1,000

Website
- www.islamiccenterofriverside.net

The Islamic Center of Riverside is a mosque in Riverside, California. Built in 1979, Friday services regularly attract over 1,000 worshipers.

== History ==
The mosque is a member of the Islamic Shura Council of Southern California network of mosques. The building was erected in 1979–80 and designed by architect Shakil Patel. The site, close to the University of California Riverside campus, was chosen to enable the mosque to serve university students as well as the wider community. Along with 23 other "Islamic Centers" in California, the mosque has held an annual open house offering Californians an opportunity to learn more about Islam in the wake of the September 11 attacks. The mosque is known for its "interfaith efforts and welcoming atmosphere."

The Islamic Center organizes an annual ceremony, held at the Riverside Convention Center. During the ceremony, all Muslims from the Inland Empire who are graduating from high schools or college are honored, and cash prizes are awarded to top students in several categories. Members filled 50 cartons with relief supplies and raised over $15,000 for victims of the 2004 Indian Ocean earthquake and tsunami.

Mustafa H. Kuko became imam of the Center in 1998. At that time, only about 2% of those attending the Center were American-born; by 2012, about 15% were. In June 2014, Kuko told The Press-Enterprise that the Center has worked hard to prevent young people from connecting with terrorist propaganda. He said that the press "overlooked what we have been doing in our communities for many years. ... We have been talking to our communities. We have been talking to our families." On July 21, 2017, guest speaker Imam Mahmoud Harmoush delivered a speech at the Islamic Center of Riverside that drew controversy for allegations of antisemitic rhetoric. Harmoush later claimed that his words had been misinterpreted by "politically-motivated people who fish in dirty water."

=== 2015 San Bernardino attack ===
Syed Rizwan Farook, one of the shooters in the 2015 San Bernardino attack, and neighbor Enrique Marquez, who is currently under investigation in relation to the attack, attended prayers at the Islamic Center of Riverside along with one of the victims of the shooting. Farook and the other shooter Tashfeen Malik, who were married abroad, held their wedding reception at the Islamic Center of Riverside. Farook abruptly stopped attending the center in 2014 following his marriage. The Center's director did not recall ever hearing extremist ideology from Farook, and stated that if such ideas were known, they would have tried to stop it, as Farook's actions betrayed the principles of Islam. The Islamic Center of Riverside held a prayer vigil on the Friday after the shooting, extending sympathy to the shooting victims and condemning the attack.
