= Bullet button =

Device used to remove a magazine in a semi-automatic rifle

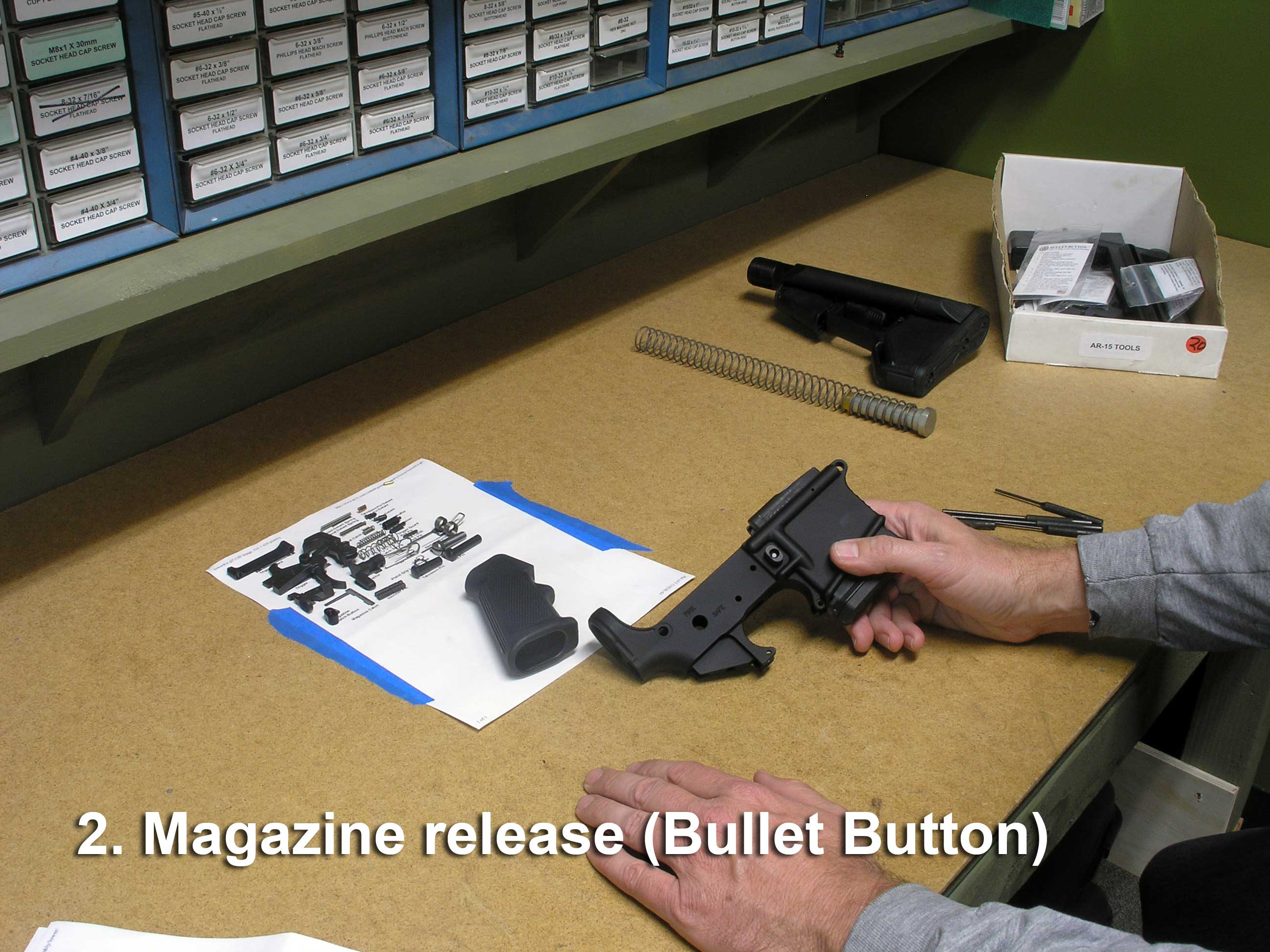
AR-15 receiver with bullet button

A bullet button is a device used to remove a magazine in a semi-automatic rifle, replacing the magazine release with a block which forces the user to remove the magazine by using a tool rather than the magazine release button. This allowed the rifle to comply with parts of California's firearms laws, prior to them being updated. The name came about in relation to a 1999 California law which said that a "bullet or ammunition cartridge is considered a tool."

The 2012 court case Haynie v Pleasanton validated that a bullet button is legal and rifles that have one installed are not considered assault weapons.

In 2016, California law was changed to prohibit the sale of firearms with bullet buttons.

== History ==
After certain rifles with detachable magazines and certain other features were classified as assault weapons under California State law, gun owners and manufacturers sought various ways to obtain certain styles of rifles similar to those determined to be assault weapons. One of the most common modifications is the use of a part known as a bullet button, which modifies a rifle so that the magazine is not removable without the use of a tool (a bullet was defined as a tool per state law). The bullet button was invented and named by Darin Prince of California in January 2007. Prince also holds the US Trademark for Bullet Button USPTO trademark registration number 77663672.

The bullet button recesses a small release within a block that replaces the magazine release. The recessed button to detach the magazine cannot be pressed by the shooter's finger. Firearms with this feature no longer have a "detachable magazine" under California's assault weapons definition, and therefore may be exempt depending on the other requirements.

Many tools have been devised to make it easier and faster to release a magazine from a rifle, as California law states that the user must use an external tool not attached to the rifle.

California Senator Leland Yee, who was later convicted of arms trafficking, attempted to have the bullet button outlawed in California, as did U.S. Senator Dianne Feinstein at the federal level; both attempts failed. On April 20, 2016, California state lawmakers gave initial approval of a bill that prohibited the sale of rifles with the bullet button. This was in response to a December 2015 terrorist attack in San Bernardino, California. In July, the legislation was signed by the governor, and sales of bullet button-equipped rifles in late 2016 were reported by the Los Angeles Times to have doubled in anticipation of a January 1, 2017, ban on sales of new such rifles.
