= Inland Regional Center =

Not-for-profit public benefit corporation operating in southeastern California

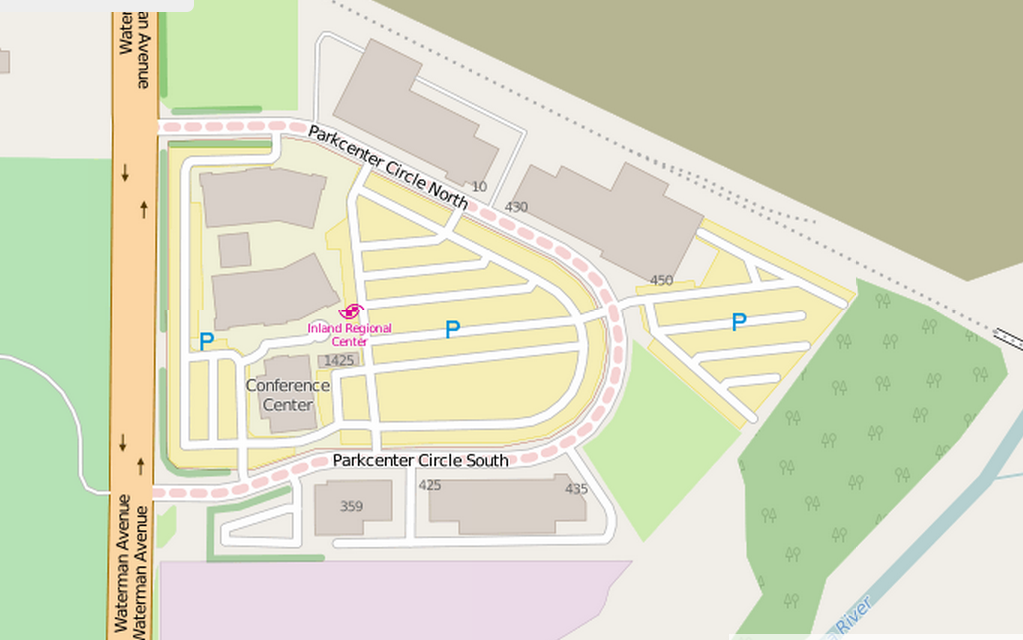
- Formation: August 1971; 55 years ago (incorporated); February 1972; 54 years ago (opened)
- Type: Government-funded not-for-profit public benefit corporation
- Headquarters: 1365 South Waterman Avenue, San Bernardino, California, United States 92408
- Coordinates: 34.0758°N 117.2777°W
- Region served: Riverside County, San Bernardino County
- Services: Services and programs for people with developmental disabilities and their families
- Executive director: Lavinia Johnson
- Associate director: Kevin Urtz
- Board of directors: Inland Regional Center Board of Trustees
- Website: Official website

Inland Regional Center (IRC), formally Inland Counties Regional Center, Inc., is a government-funded not-for-profit public benefit corporation that provides services and programs to more than 33,000 people with developmental disabilities and their families in California's San Bernardino and Riverside Counties. Its headquarters, which include a conference center, are located in San Bernardino; the center also operates a branch office in Riverside. The center is part of a statewide network of regional centers established by the state of California to provide these services under the Lanterman Developmental Disabilities Act.

== History ==
IRC was incorporated in 1971 and opened in February 1972 as the thirteenth of what became 21 such California centers established by the Lanterman Developmental Disabilities Act and contracted by the California Department of Developmental Services.

IRC also operated the San Gabriel-Pomona Regional Center from July 1985 to June 1986. In 1990, services for Inyo and Mono counties were switched from Inland Regional Center to Kern Regional Center in Bakersfield. In 1996, the center opened its current headquarters in San Bernardino.

In 2010, the California Bureau of State Audits found Inland Regional Center had a "culture of employee intimidation" and concluded the center had violated part of its contract with the state. The audit raised questions about how it sets provider rates, handles property and manages its housing program. The state of California placed the agency on probation in January 2011 and ordered improvements. The auditors found the work environment fostered fear of retaliation for speaking out. Changes were made to policies, and communication measures increased, but some employees said that the work environment actually became worse. Lake Elsinore state Assemblyman Kevin Jeffries unsuccessfully introduced legislation to split the agency and increase transparency.

In 2012, the organization received $247 million from the Department of Developmental Services for delivering services. A rail station next to the center was planned to open in 2020 as part of the Arrow commuter rail service. However, as of November 2016, the station location is no longer planned to be adjacent to the center due to heightened security after the 2015 shooting.

=== Terrorist attack ===
On December 2, 2015, husband and wife Syed Rizwan Farook and Tashfeen Malik perpetrated a terrorist attack at the center, which consisted of a mass shooting and an attempted bombing and resulted in 14 dead and 22 injured. The shooters targeted an event for employees of the San Bernardino County Department of Public Health, held in an auditorium with about 80 people. The county had rented the conference center portion of the three building complex. The shooters fled in an SUV. The perpetrators were killed by police after gunfire was exchanged with the occupants of the SUV. Farook, who worked for the public health department as an environmental health inspector, had earlier attended the event.
