= Ali al-Thawadi =

Qatari diplomat and politician

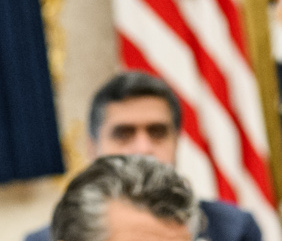
al-Thawadi in the Oval Office in September 2025

Ali Abdulla H.R. al-Thawadi (born January 1982) is a Qatari minister, diplomat and former chief of staff to Mohammed bin Hamad Al Thani. He was deputy chief executive for Qatar's successful bid to host the FIFA World Cup, and has been part of Qatar's role as mediator between Hamas and Israel during the Gaza war. He currently sits on the Gaza Executive Board.

== Involvement in Football ==
Al-Thawadi was the deputy chief executive for Qatar's bid for the 2022 FIFA World Cup. As part of this bid he oversaw a campaign seeking to sabotage rivals for the world cup, including hiring influential people to attack their own countries' bids and to influence the US congress by composing a resolution on the harmful effects of hosting the World Cup. His older brother, Hassan Al-Thawadi was Secretary General at Supreme Committee for Delivery and Legacy for the 2022 FIFA World Cup Qatar Local Organizing Committee.

In 2025 he gave €30 million to FC Barcelona to buy VIP boxes at the newly renovated Camp Nou stadium.

== Diplomatic career ==
Following the Israeli attack on Doha, al-Thawadi was present at a White House meeting with Benjamin Netanyahu where he was central in coordinating his apology for the bombings. He was involved in the negotiations between Hamas and Israel leading to a ceasefire during the Gaza war, leading to the release of a number of hostages and played a role in Qatar's contribution to Donald Trump's Gaza peace plan.

In January 2026, al-Thawadi was appointed as the Qatari representative to the Gaza Executive Board. He previously served as Chief of staff to Mohammed bin Hamad Al Thani, brother of the Emir of Qatar, and is currently serving as Minister at the Prime Minister's Office for strategy affairs.

Al-Thawadi has been involved in negotiations between the US and Iran at various stages during the 2026 Iran war; reporting by Axios, al-Thawadi was in Tehran to serve as mediator between US negotiators Steve Witkoff and Jared Kushner and Iran's Abbas Araghchi in negotiations for the Islamabad Memorandum.

== Controversies ==
He was involved in the corruption scandal of US Senator Bob Menendez, where he is mentioned in court documents as an investment advisor to Qatar and a principle at Heritage Advisors and provided Formula One tickets for the Senator.

According to Ahmed Fouad Alkhatib he was also involved in a scheme to smuggle "suitcases of cash" into Gaza.

During the investigation into Qatargate in February 2026, he was found to have had meetings with suspects affiliated with Novard, including Yoav Mordechai. According to a report by Channel 12 he also had meetings in 2024 with Jonatan Urich with one meeting also attended by Yisrael Einhorn and Jay Footlik.
