= Ofer Hadad =

Israeli journalist

- עופר חדד
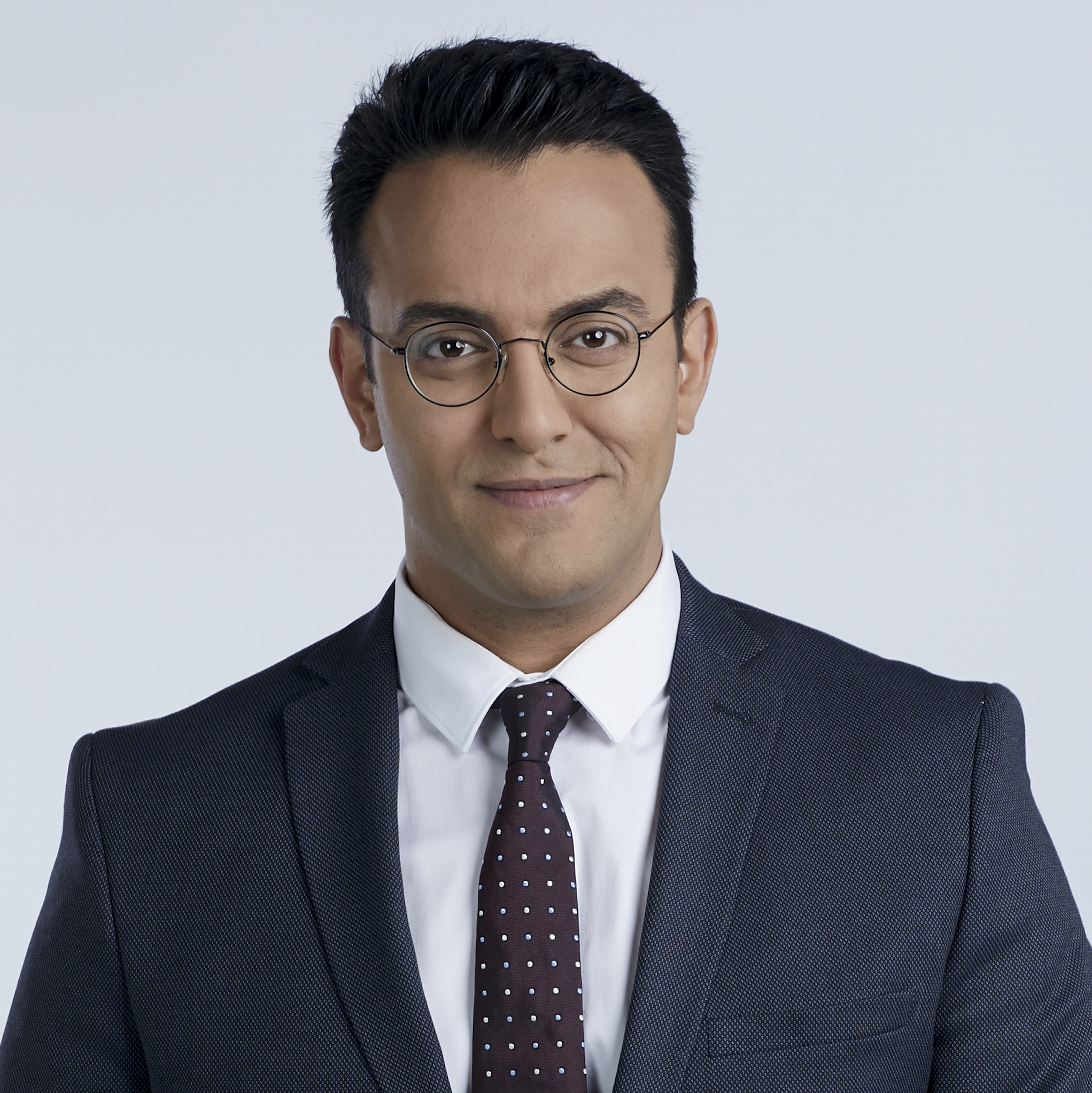
- Born: December 18, 1983 (age 42); Rishon LeZion
- Citizenship: Israel
- Occupations: Hevrat HaHadashot, Radio Jerusalem
- Children: 3

Ofer Hadad (Hebrew: עופר חדד; born December 18, 1983) is an Israeli journalist. He serves as a political correspondent and host of Today's Edition on Hevrat HaHadashot, as well as Morning Diary on Radio Jerusalem. He previously hosted the program Shalosh on Israeli Channel 12.

== Biography ==
Hadad was born and raised in Rishon LeZion, the third of four children, in a national religious household. His father, Naftali, worked as a farmer, and his mother, Sari, served a lengthy career in the Israel Defense Forces (IDF), reaching a senior rank. He attended the state religious elementary school "Harel" in his hometown and participated actively in the Bnei Akiva youth movement.

Hadad served in the Israeli Intelligence Corps through the Hesder program but ended his military service prematurely due to injuries sustained in a car accident.

In 2022, following Avshalom Kor’s retirement, Hadad was selected to host the International Bible Contest (חידון התנ"ך העולמי).

=== Qatargate ===
On 10 February 2025, Ofer Hadad reported on Channel 12 that the closest advisors to Israeli Prime Minister Benjamin Netanyahu: Yisrael Einhorn, Ofer Golan, Jonatan Urich, and Eli Feldstein, were employed by the Qatari government, for promoting the Qatari interests in the top political and security authorities of Israel, including the image of Qatar.

Following the report, opposition leader Yair Lapid called for an investigation into Qatar's reported actions and called it "a clear detriment" to Israeli security. On 27 February 2025, Gali Baharav-Miara, the Attorney General of Israel, instructed the Shin Bet and the Police of Israel to open an investigation.

== Personal life ==
Hadad lives Talbiya, Jerusalem. he's married to Hodi and they have 3 children. He holds a bachelor's degree from Bar-Ilan University.
