= Yisrael Einhorn =

Israeli political advisor

- Parent: Talia Einhorn

Srulik Einhorn, also known as Yisrael Einhorn, is an advisor to Serbian president Aleksandar Vučić. He previously served as a senior advisor to Israeli prime minister Benjamin Netanyahu and is a fugitive, wanted for arrest by the Israeli police for the 2024 Israeli secret document leak scandal and the Qatari connection affair.

== Biography ==
He was the co-founder of Allenby Concept House and worked with Heineken and SodaStream. Einhorn advised Netanyahu in five election campaigns, from 2019 until 2022.

Einhorn was living in Belgrade, Serbia for approximately a year, as of July 2025.

He has served as an advisor to Serbian president Aleksandar Vučić since approximately 2020.

== Legal issues ==
Einhorn ran Perception Media alongside Jonatan Urich. They worked on a pro-Qatar media campaign in the lead up to the 2022 FIFA World Cup, where Einhorn created talking points to be used and passed them along to Eli Feldstein, who sent them to Urich; Urich did not disclose the original source. Previous attempts were made to depose Einhorn in Serbia over his involvement in the Qatari connection affair, though they were unsuccessful, with Einhorn attempting to negotiate a deal with the State Attorney where he would not be arrested on his return to Israel. Einhorn requested that he be questioned in Serbia, which the State Attorney initially refused, instead seeking to arrest or extradite him. Einhorn was reluctant to travel to Israel, so Serbian and Israeli authorities coordinated to approve an "overseas deposition" for him.

Einhorn, Urich and Ofer Golan were indicted in February 2025 over charges of witness tampering, where they allegedly made plans to harass Shlomo Filber, a key witness in Netanyahu's corruption trial, called Case 4000.

He is also closely involved in the 2024 Israeli secret document leak scandal, where Urich and Feldstein obtained classified information (which was originally leaked by Ari Rosenfeld, an IDF reserve officer), and gave it to Einhorn, though he was not authorized to receive it.

Einhorn was interrogated in July 2025 by the Serbian Justice Ministry, with two members of the Unit of International Crime Investigations from the Israeli police (Shlomo Meshulam and Gil Rachlin) also present, regarding Einhorn's involvement in the 2024 Israeli secret document leak scandal, as well as the Qatari connection affair. As of January 2026, the Israeli police considers Einhorn a fugitive from justice with an outstanding arrest warrant.

The office of the State Attorney indicated in mid-April 2026 that it was not able to extradite Einhorn. The following month, attorney general Gali Baharav-Miara informed the court that the witness intimidation case was suspended, as Einhorn could not be extradited.
