= Tzachi Braverman =

Israeli diplomat (born 1959)

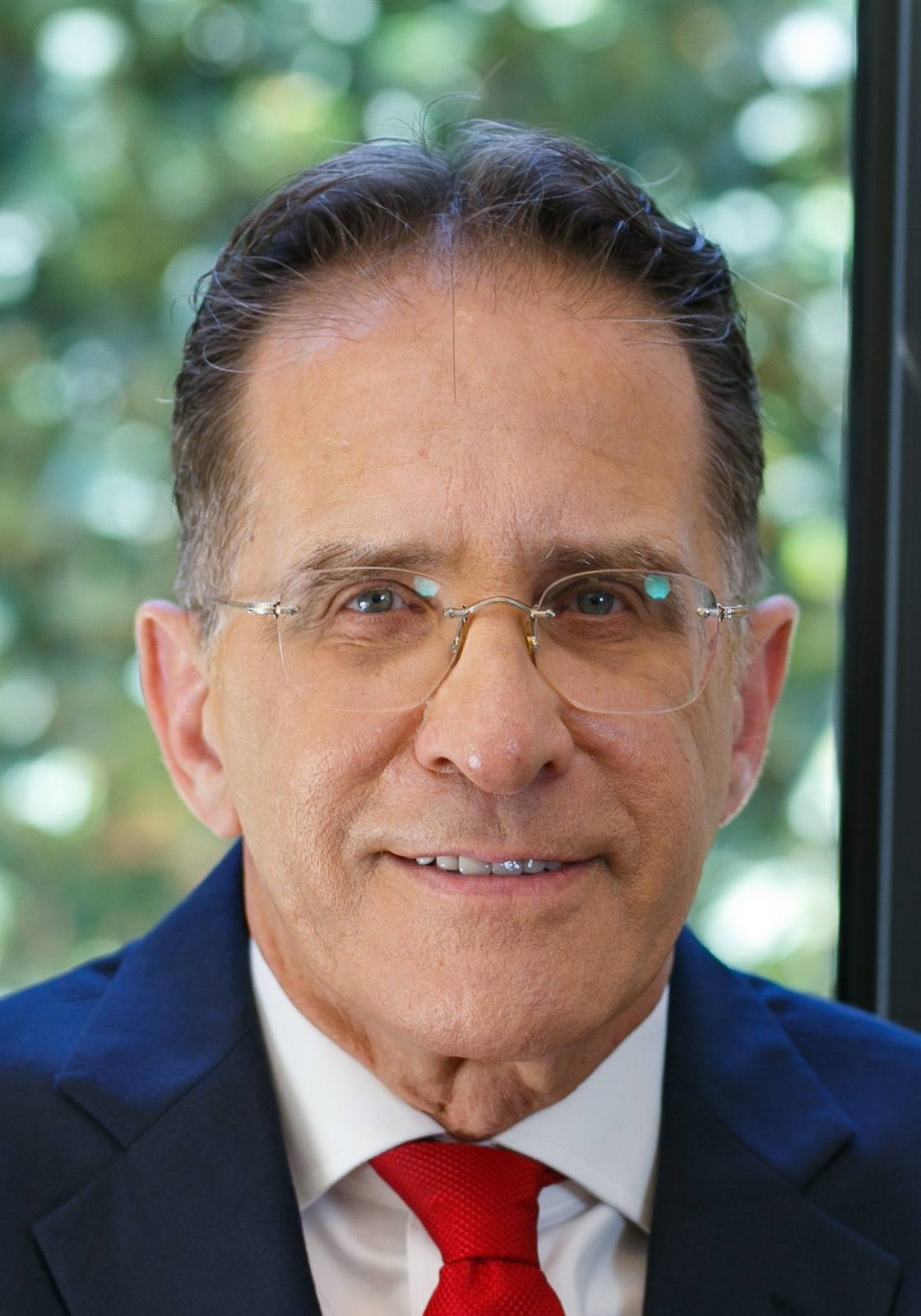
- Braverman in 2021

Ambassador of Israel to the United Kingdom
- Incumbent
- Assumed office TBD
- President: Isaac Herzog
- Prime Minister: Benjamin Netanyahu
- Preceded by: Tzipi Hotovely

Chief of Staff of the Prime Minister of Israel
- Incumbent
- Assumed office 29 December 2022
- Prime Minister: Benjamin Netanyahu
- Preceded by: Danny Wesley

Cabinet Secretary of the Government of Israel
- In office 15 November 2016 – 13 June 2021
- Prime Minister: Benjamin Netanyahu
- Preceded by: Shalom Shlomo
- Succeeded by: Aryeh Zohar

Personal details
- Born: Yitzhak Braverman; 7 March 1959 (age 67) Tel Aviv, Israel
- Party: Likud
- Spouse: Nava Braverman
- Children: 6
- Education: Bar-Ilan University
- Occupation: Jurist • Civil servant • Diplomat

Yitzhak "Tzachi" Braverman (born 7 March 1959) is an Israeli diplomat who has served as chief of staff to Prime Minister Benjamin Netanyahu since December 2022. He previously served as Cabinet Secretary of the Government of Israel from 2016 to 2021. In 2025, he was nominated as Ambassador of Israel to the United Kingdom. The same year, various criminal investigations were launched.

== Early life and education ==
Braverman was born on 7 March 1959 in Tel Aviv, Israel. He holds a law degree from Bar-Ilan University.

== Career ==
Braverman has served in senior roles in the Israeli government across multiple terms under Prime Minister Benjamin Netanyahu. He served as Cabinet Secretary of the Government of Israel from 15 November 2016 to 13 June 2021, succeeding Shalom Shlomo and being succeeded by Aryeh Zohar. From 29 December 2022, he has served as Chief of Staff to the Prime Minister, succeeding Danny Wesley in that role.

=== Nomination as Ambassador to the United Kingdom ===
In September 2025, Braverman was nominated to serve as Ambassador of Israel to the United Kingdom, expected to succeed Tzipi Hotovely. The cabinet approved the nomination on 21 September 2025. The UK has indicated that it does not plan to approve Braverman's diplomatic credentials.

== Personal life ==
Braverman is married to Nava, who is a judge. They have six children.

== Legal issues ==
=== Forgery and fraud investigation (2025) ===
In September 2025, Braverman was investigated for suspected forgery and fraud in the Prime Minister's Office and was questioned by police.

=== Bild leak investigation (2026) ===
A separate investigation was launched in January 2026 over allegations by Eli Feldstein that Braverman had interfered in the investigation into the 2024 Israeli secret document leak scandal.

On 11 January 2026, following an extensive police interrogation, Braverman was barred from leaving Israel and prohibited from contacting Netanyahu. These restrictions were lifted on 15 January by the Rishon Lezion Magistrate Court, but reimposed on 19 January by the Central District Court, which accepted a police appeal.

On 23 January 2026, the Lod District Court imposed a gag order, set to expire on 22 February, on the investigation into an alleged meeting between Feldstein and Braverman, following a police appeal seeking broader restrictions than a lower court had imposed. The travel ban was extended on 29 January by the Rishon Lezion Magistrate Court until 10 February.

On 3 February 2026, after the Rishon Lezion District Court relaxed a gag order, further details emerged indicating that Braverman was being investigated over the possible misuse of classified information. On 11 February, the Rishon Lezion Magistrate Court lifted the travel ban, allowing Braverman to take up his ambassadorial post; however, the ban on contact between Braverman and several individuals, including Feldstein and Netanyahu aide Jonatan Urich, was extended until 26 February.

On 17 February 2026, the Lod District Court reimposed the travel ban and a ban on working in the Prime Minister's Office. Judge Michael Karshen stated that the state's case had "strengthened". The Supreme Court of Israel rejected Braverman's appeal on 22 February 2026. Several days later, Braverman accepted a temporary extension of his release conditions pending a further court ruling.

On 2 March 2026, the Rishon Lezion Magistrate Court ruled that Braverman should be permitted to serve in his appointed ambassadorial position, voiding both the travel ban and the contact ban with Netanyahu. Braverman remains prohibited from discussing the investigation with Netanyahu, and the ban on contact with other suspects in the case was extended until 10 March.

The Office of the State Attorney announced in late May that Braverman would be called for a "pre-indictment hearing" on charges of "suspicion of fraud, breach of trust, and obstruction of justice".
