= Yoav Mordechai =

Israeli retired general

- יואב "פולי" מרדכי
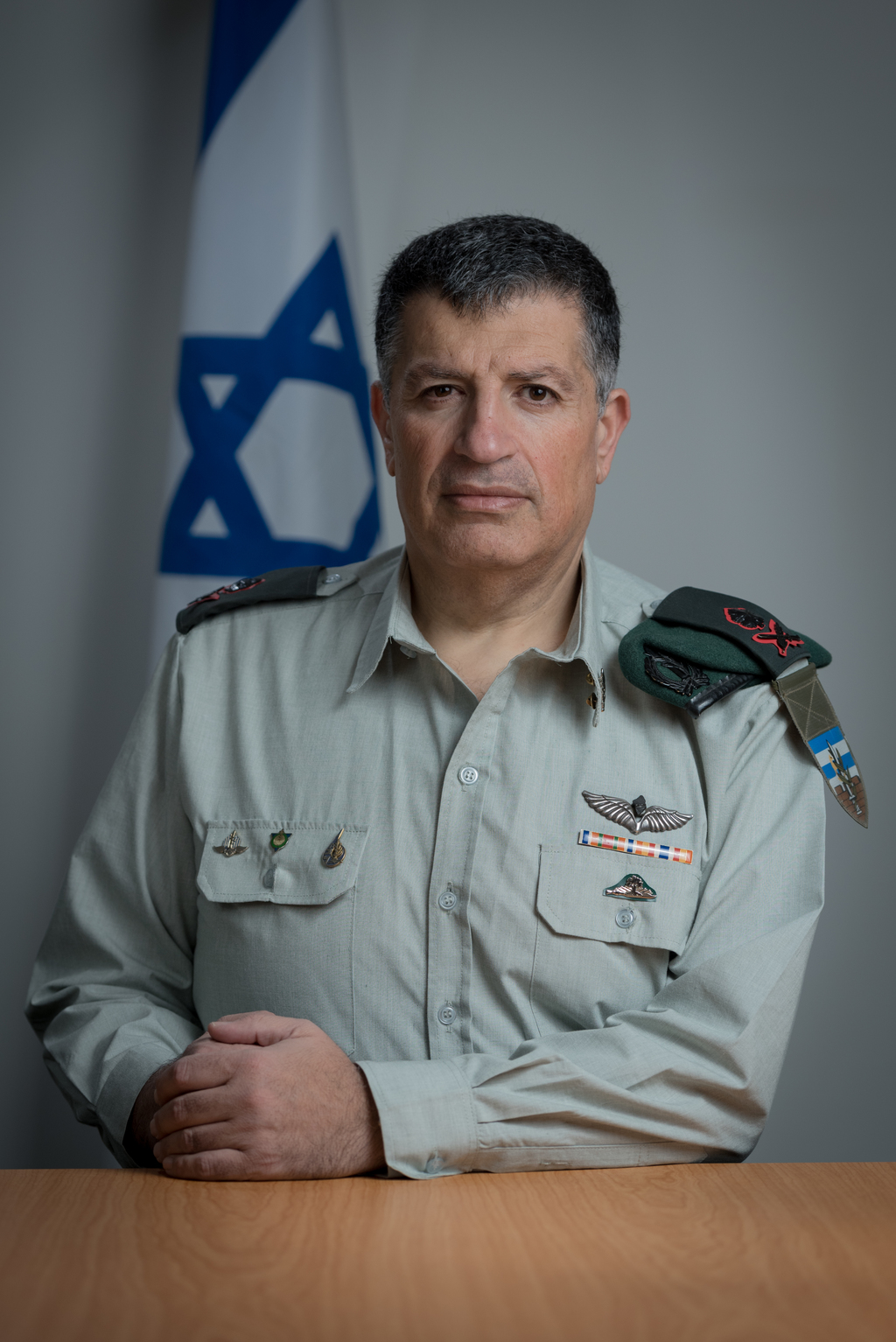
- Born: 25 March 1964 (age 62); Jerusalem
- Military career
- Allegiance: Israel
- Rank: Aluf (major general)
- Commands: IDF Spokesperson, Head of the Civil Administration in the West Bank

Yoav "Poli" Mordechai (Hebrew: יואב "פולי" מרדכי; born 25 March 1964) is a retired major general in the Israel Defense Forces.

== Early life and education ==
Mordechai was born on March 25, 1964 in Jerusalem. He studied in the high school yeshiva Kiryat Noar.

Mordechai has a master's degree in government and politics and additional master's degree in National Security studies in the frame of the National Security College.

== Military career ==
Mordechai was drafted to the IDF in 1982 and served as a soldier and an officer in the 51st Battalion of the Golani Brigade. While serving along the Israel-Lebanon border, he was the primary handler of Avraham Sinai, who spied on Hezbollah for Israel.

Mordechai later served between 1986-1987 in the Research Department in the Intelligence Directorate. He attended an Arabic course with the Shin Bet and served in several command positions in Unit 504 of the Intelligence Branch. In 2001, he was appointed to be chief of coordination and connection headquarters in Gaza, and later served as chief of civilian administration in the West Bank in the staff of the Government's Actions Coordinator in the Territories.

From 7 April 2011, to 14 October 2013, Mordechai served as the IDF Spokesperson. On 29 January 2014, following his promotion to the rank of major general, he was appointed as the Coordinator of Government Activities in the Territories. He concluded his 36-year career in the IDF in 2018 as the Coordinator of Government Activities in the Territories.

== Qatar connection affair ==
Mordechai was suspended from hostage negotiations for two weeks by the Israeli police because of his alleged involvement in the Qatari connection affair, for which he was investigated the previous month, on "suspicion of contact with a foreign agent and bribery." He is also suspected of transferring large amounts of money to Jonatan Urich, another figure in the case. Mordechai allegedly carried out deals with Qatar through an intermediary to gain favorable coverage for Qatar before the 2022 World Cup, working with Jay Footlik's company The Third Circle.

== Personal life ==
Mordechai speaks fluent Arabic.

Mordechai is married and has three daughters.
