= Vyacheslav Kalashnikov Polishchuk =

Vyacheslav Vitalievich Kalashnikov (born November 6, 1955) is a Russian mathematics professor and researcher currently working at the Tec de Monterrey, Monterrey Campus in Mexico. His work has been recognized by awards from the Ukrainian Academy of Sciences and the Central Economic Mathematical Institute of the Russian Academy of Sciences and is also a Level III member of Mexico’s Sistema Nacional de Investigadores.

== Biography ==
He was born in Vladivostok, Russia and is married to mathematician Nataliya Kalashnykova. They have one daughter.

Kalashnikov obtained his bachelor's degree and masters in mathematics from the Novosibirsk State University in Novosibirsk, Siberia. He went on to obtain his doctorate here and at the Central Economic Mathematical Institute of the Russian Academy of Sciences in Moscow in mathematical cybernetics .

He began his career as an associate professor at the Altai State University in Barnaul, Russia and in 1985 he became a researcher with the Mathematics Institute of the Russian Science Academy in Novosibirsk before moving onto the Sumy State University in Sumy, Ukraine in 1989. In 1995 he began working at the Central Economic Mathematical Instituteof the Russian Academy of Sciencesas head researcher. In 1998 he became the assistant director of the economics department of the University of Humanistic Sciences in Moscow. In 2002, he was invited to teach at the Universidad Autónoma de Nuevo León by CONACYT for a two-year contract. At the time, he spoke no Spanish but was able to teach classes in English. At the end of the contract, he decided to stay in Mexico because his wife found a teaching position and his daughter had begun medical school in Mexico. He has been a researcher and professor at Tec de Monterrey, Monterrey Campus since 2004, mostly doing research but also teaching problem solving methods for bi level programming. He now speaks Spanish fluently.

Kalashnikov’s main research specialty is optimization, especially in complementarity and unequal variables. In 2002 he published the book “Complementarity, Equilibrium, Efficiency and Economics” in London. In addition he has authored or co-authored eight book chapters and published twenty five journal articles. He has presented his work in conferences in Mexico and abroad.

In 1993 Kalashnikov received a medal from the Ukrainian Academy of Sciences and in 1997 an award from the Central Economic Mathematical Institute for his research work. Since 2015, he has had Level III membership in the Sistema Nacional de Investigadores (National Roster of Researchers) of Mexico. He also appears in the seventh edition of Five Hundred Leaders of Influence. He is a member of the Russian Association of Mathematical Programming, the American Mathematical Society and the Mexican Mathematical Society.

== See also ==
List of Monterrey Institute of Technology and Higher Education faculty
