= Ronen Bar =

Israeli intelligence officer (born 1965)

- רונן בר
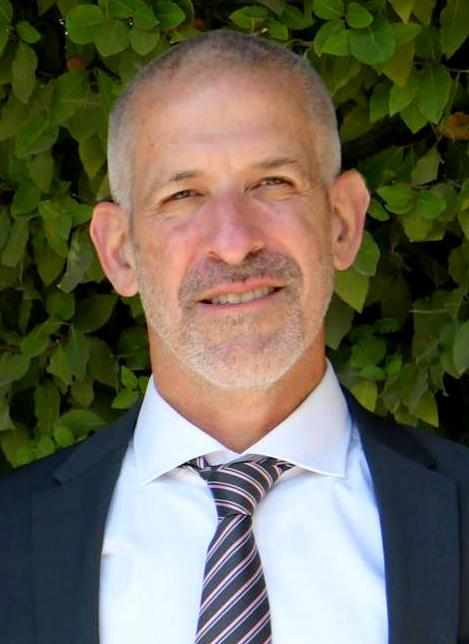
- Born: Ronen Beresovsky; 25 December 1965 (age 60); Rehovot, Israel
- Education: Tel Aviv University; Harvard University
- Occupation: Intelligence official
- Espionage activity
- Allegiance: Israel
- Service branch: Shabak
- Service years: 1993–2025
- Rank: Director

Ronen Bar (Hebrew: רונן בר; born 25 December 1965) is an Israeli intelligence officer who served as the director of the Israeli Security Agency (commonly referred to as Shin Bet, Shabak, or ISA) from 13 October 2021 to 15 June 2025. He replaced Nadav Argaman, after having served as his deputy since 2018. Bar was appointed by Prime Minister Naftali Bennett and his nomination was approved by Israel's cabinet on 11 October 2021. He assumed office on 13 October 2021 and was fired in March 2025, though his firing was suspended by the High Court of Israel. He submitted his resignation in April, which came into effective in June.

== Biography ==
Ronen Bar was born in Rehovot under the name Ronen Beresovsky. Bar joined the IDF in 1984 and served as a soldier and officer in the elite Sayeret Matkal unit. After finishing his military service in 1988, Bar opened a cafe in Tel Aviv called "Bagdad Cafe". He joined Shin Bet as a field agent in 1993, and in 2011 was named head of Shin Bet's Operations Division. Bar became head of the resource development department in 2016, and became Shin Bet deputy chief in 2018. He was nominated as the head of the Shin Bet on 11 October 2021 and assumed office two days later.

Bar was initially expected to serve as director until 2026, but in March 2025 was unanimously fired by the Israeli government after Prime Minister Benjamin Netanyahu claimed to have "lost trust" in him. Bar accused the government of firing him for investigating Qatari involvement and influence in the Prime Minister's Office, in a case known as the Qatari Connection Affair. Bar's term ended on 15 June 2025 midnight, following his submitted resignation.

Bar holds a BA in Political Science and Philosophy from the Tel Aviv University with honors, and an MA in Public Management from Harvard University. He is fluent in Arabic in addition to Hebrew.

== Dismissal attempt and resignation ==
In an all-staff memo made public on 16 October 2023, Bar took responsibility for failing to thwart the 7 October 2023 attack by Hamas. "The responsibility is mine. Despite a series of actions we carried out, unfortunately, on Saturday we were unable to establish sufficient deterrence so as to thwart the attack," he wrote. "There will be time for investigations. Now we are fighting."

In a recording revealed on 3 December 2023, Bar was heard to say that after the 7 October Hamas attack, Israel would kill Hamas's leaders "in every location," even if it takes years. "We are determined to do it, this is our Munich," referring to Israeli efforts to retaliate against terrorists responsible for the 1972 Munich Olympics attack that killed 11 Israelis.

On 16 March 2025, Prime Minister Benjamin Netanyahu announced that he intended to submit a proposal to the government to terminate Bar's role as head of the Shin Bet, claiming that "At any time, but especially during such an existential war, the prime minister must have complete confidence in the director of the [Shin Bet]. Unfortunately, however, the situation is the opposite.”

On 20 March 2025, the Israeli cabinet voted to dismiss Bar, effective 10 April, or when a new director is chosen, following a controversy in which Shin Bet was investigating allegations involving staff in the prime minister's office and Qatar. Netanyahu reportedly criticized Bar over his support for a state commission of inquiry over 7 October, which was one of the reasons for Bar's dismissal. Attorney General Gali Baharav-Miara had prior to her own dismissal said Bar could not be dismissed without prior approval by an advisory committee on senior appointments. On 21 March 2025, Bar's dismissal was suspended by the Supreme Court of Israel following a petition that was jointly filed by Yesh Atid, National Unity, The Democrats and Yisrael Beiteinu, and a separate petition that was filed by the Movement for Quality Government in Israel and “Protective Walls of Israel” Forum. The court ruled on 9 April that Bar could not be fired as long as the imposed injunction was in place and both sides were given until 20 April to reach a compromise.

In an affidavit, Bar said Netanyahu had "pressed him to spy on those Israeli citizens who had led and funded anti-government protests" and "demanded personal loyalty above the rulings of the Supreme Court in the event of a constitutional crisis."

Following the government's decision, several entities and opposition parties filed a petition with the Supreme Court against Bar's dismissal.

On 21 March, Supreme Court Judge Gila Canfy-Steinitz froze the dismissal and ordered a hearing in an expanded panel "no later than April 8." In response to the petition, the government argued that the issue was not adjudicated.

On 8 April 2025, the Supreme Court heard the petitions and ruled that Netanyahu was prohibited from announcing a replacement, but was permitted to interview possible candidates. The judges added that the government was prohibited from excluding Bar from the consultations. The decision allowed both the head of the Shin Bet and the Prime Minister to submit affidavits in support of their factual claims. At the same time, the government and Attorney General of Israel Gali Baharav-Miara were allowed to reach an agreed settlement by 20 April.

On 28 April, Bar tendered his resignation effective 15 June, citing responsibility for failing to prevent the 7 October attacks.

=== Affidavit of the head of the Shin Bet ===
On 21 April, Bar submitted an affidavit to the court, most of it secret and some of it public. In his affidavit, Bar said that his conclusion from the sequence of events is that the source of the desire to terminate his tenure was not for professional reasons but based on his supposed lack of loyalty to the Prime Minister, and that until November 2024, the Shin Bet had received many compliments from the Prime Minister.

In the public part of the affidavit, Bar made the following statements:

- Netanyahu asked him to give a security opinion that Netanyahu cannot testify at his trial and Bar refused to do so.
- The Prime Minister's Office asked him to act against anti-government protesters and monitor "protest financiers", including Gonen Ben Itzhak.
- Netanyahu demanded personal loyalty, obedience to him and not to the Supreme Court.
- The Shin Bet started an investigation that referenced the policy of the political echelon towards the Gaza Strip and the warnings that were conveyed by Shin Bet to the political echelon during 2023, but were ignored by the political echelon.
- The Shin Bet started an investigation into the connection between those employed in the Prime Minister's Office and the government of Qatar which resulted in his dismissal.

On 21 May, the Supreme Court declared Bar's dismissal "unlawful".

== Personal life ==
Bar's wife, Dafna, is a sister of entrepreneur Shai Agassi.
