= Cabinet Secretary (Israel) =

Senior Israeli government official

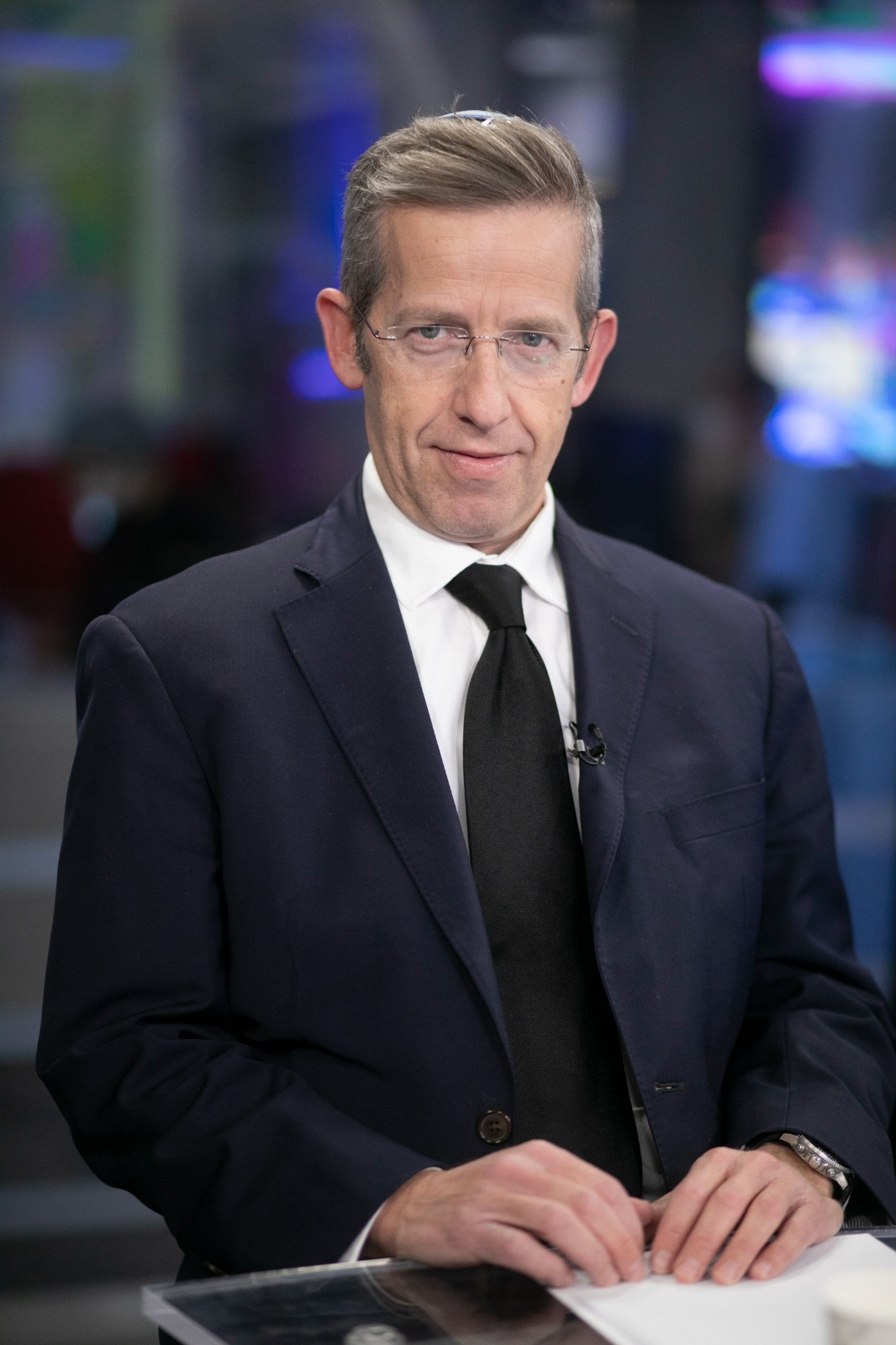
Yossi Fuchs, current Cabinet Secretary

The Cabinet Secretary (Hebrew: מזכיר הממשלה) is a senior Israeli government official who heads the Cabinet Secretariat, a unit in the Prime Minister's Office. The Cabinet Secretary serves under section 31 (f) of the Basic Law: The Government, as well as under section 8 of the Government Law. The Government appoints the Cabinet Secretary, as proposed by the Prime Minister.

== Duties ==
The Cabinet Secretary is responsible for:

- Preparation of the agenda for government meetings and ministerial committees. To this end, he is in constant contact with members of the government.
- Liaisoning between the Government and the President, whom he updates at least once a week on government decisions and on matters on the agenda of the government.
- Liaisoning between the government and the Knesset, alongside a Government Minister appointed for this task.
- Representing the government as a spokesperson for the media, alongside the spokesperson of the Prime Minister.
- Any other task assigned to him by the Prime Minister.

Most Cabinet Secretaries studied law. Many became Knesset members, attorneys general, and government ministers. Elyakim Rubinstein became a supreme justice and Isaac Herzog president of Israel.

== List of cabinet secretaries ==
=== 20th century ===
1. Ze'ev Sherf (1948–57)
–. Yael Uzay (interim, 1957–58)
2. Katriel Katz (1958–62)
3. Yael Uzay (first term, 1962–68)
4. Michael Arnon (1968–74)
5. Gershon Avner (1974-77)
6. Arye Naor (1977–82)
7. Dan Meridor (1982–84)
8. Yossi Beilin (1984–86)
9. Elyakim Rubinstein (1986–94)
10. Shmuel Hollander (1994–96)
11. Dan Naveh (1996–1999)
12. Gideon Sa'ar (1999)

=== 21st century ===
13. Isaac Herzog (1999–2001)
—. Gideon Sa'ar (second term, 2001–02)
—. Aharon Lishansky (interim, 2002–03)
14. Israel Maimon (2003–07)
15. Oved Yehezkehel (2007–09)
16. Zvi Hauser (2009–13)
17. Avichai Mandelblit (2013–2016)
—. Aryeh Zohar (interim, 2016)
18. Tzachi Braverman (2016–21)
19. Shalom Shlomo (2021–2022)
20. Yossi Fuchs (2023–)
