= Dvori =

Dvori may refer to:

- Dvori, Croatia, village
- Dvori, Koper, a settlement in the City Municipality of Koper
- Dvori, Sveti Anton, a hamlet of Sveti Anton, Koper
- Nir Dvori, Israeli journalist
