= Qatargate =

Qatargate may refer to:

- Qatar corruption scandal at the European Parliament
- Qatari connection affair, a scandal in Israel
- Qatari jet "gift", a scandal surrounding Donald Trump
