= Hassan Al-Thawadi =

Qatari lawyer and football tournament organiser

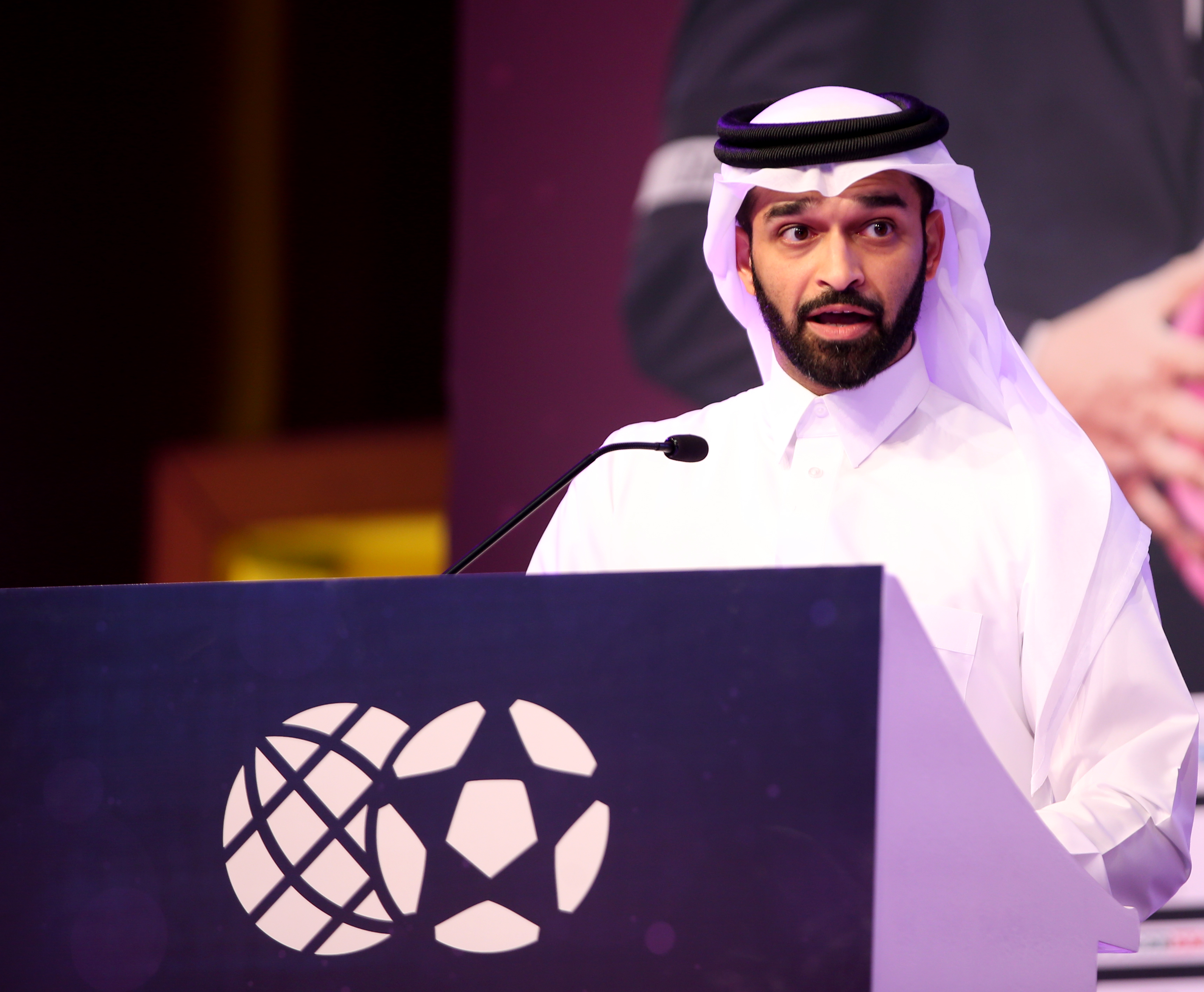

Hassan Abdulla H.R. Al-Thawadi (Arabic: حسن الذوادي) is a Qatari lawyer who was the Secretary General at Supreme Committee for Delivery and Legacy for the 2022 FIFA World Cup Qatar Local Organizing Committee. He is also a member of the famous tribe of Bani khalid.

== Career ==
In 1998, Al-Thawadi gained A-Levels in General Studies and Philosophy from John Leggott College. After that, he graduated from the University of Sheffield with a degree in law. After that, he was appointed Secretary General at Supreme Committee for Delivery and Legacy for the 2022 FIFA World Cup Qatar Local Organizing Committee.

Al-Thawadi was recognized as one of World Soccer magazine's 2022 People of the Year. He is a fan of French side OL. He is fluent in Spanish, French, English, and Arabic. He currently holds numerous positions in Qatari semi-public bodies, including being on the board of Katara Hospitality.

== Personal life ==
Al-Thawadi is the son of a Qatari diplomat. His younger brother is Qatari diplomat Ali al-Thawadi who also sat on the board of Qatar's World Cup committee.

== Controversies ==
Hassan Al Thawadi, who led Qatar's 2022 World Cup bid, allegedly offered €2.3 million each to Issa Hayatou of Cameroon, Jacques Anouma of Ivory Coast, and Amos Adamu of Nigeria in exchange for their votes. Phaedra Almajid, a former media officer for Qatar's bid, has alleged that the three African football officials were offered bribes to support Qatar's bid. The claim was made in the Netflix documentary series FIFA Uncovered. Qatar was competing with Australia, Japan, South Korea and the USA for their bid for the 2022 World Cup. Phaedra Almajid, who was in charge of the international press surrounding the bid, claimed the offer was made during a meeting of African football federations in January 2010. Almajid states that the money was intended for the football federations, not as personal bribes. She initially disclosed these allegations anonymously to the Sunday Times after being dismissed from her position, but later retracted her claims, citing threats from Qatar. Al Thawadi has denied these allegations, calling them false and expressing disappointment at the situation. The controversy adds to the ongoing scrutiny surrounding Qatar's successful bid to host the 2022 World Cup.
