= Israel Maimon =

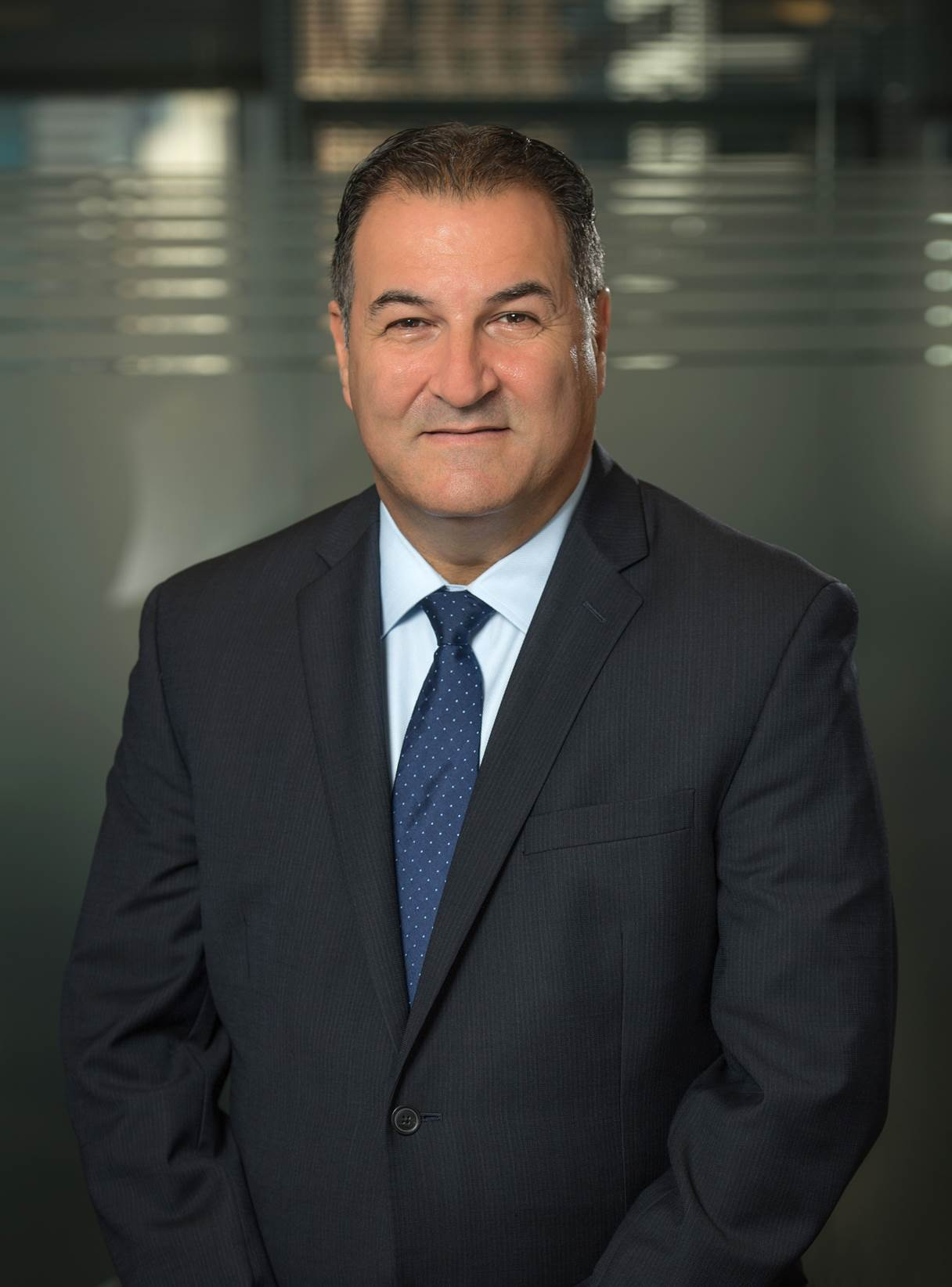
Israel Maimon

Israel Maimon (Hebrew: ישראל מימון) is president emeritus of Development Corporation for Israel/Israel Bonds.

== Biography ==
Israel Maimon joined the Israel Defense Forces in 1984 and was recruited to the Golani Brigade, where he served in all command positions, reaching the rank of company commander. As part of his reserve duty, he was an operations officer at the Infantry Division with the rank of major.

== Legal career ==
From 1993 to 2003, Maimon worked at the law firm Haberman, Dovey, Stern and Co, in Tel Aviv. The firm specialized in constitutional and administrative law, as well as dealing with civil issues, real estate and litigation on various matters. In January 1999, he became a partner at the firm, where he remained until his appointment as government secretary in March 2003. His expertise included civil, administrative and constitutional law.

== Public service career ==
In June 2002, Maimon was appointed legal advisor to the Prime Minister's Office, headed by Ariel Sharon. Prior to taking office, however, he was appointed Cabinet Secretary. On January 4, 2006, Prime Minister Sharon suffered a stroke, and, in his capacity as Cabinet Secretary, Maimon determined the authority should be transferred to Acting Prime Minister Ehud Olmert. At Prime Minister Olmert's request, Maimon continued as Cabinet Secretary. His responsibilities included heading a committee that created a comprehensive plan, structure and recommendation for Israel's ‘Hasbara’ (public relations), a plan the government approved in full. As Cabinet Secretary, Maimon was part of a pivotal moment in Israel's history – the 2007 bombing of Syria's nuclear reactor. He was assigned to interface with the Prime Minister's Office, the Defense and Foreign Ministries, the IDF, the Mossad and other relevant agencies, to prepare a strategic communications plan.

Additionally, Maimon served as chairman of the MASA project, aimed at bringing young Jewish people to Israel.

From 2007 to 2013, Maimon was a board member of the Diaspora Museum in Tel Aviv, serving as a member of the Finance Committee and chairman of the Establishment of the New Museum Committee.

== Board member of public companies ==
In September 2014, Maimon became an external director at Israel Credit Cards, a corporation providing all credit card activities, including granting private and commercial credit. He became an external director at Fox-Wiesel, Ltd., in June 2009, a public company in the fashion and home-styling field. In September 2008, Maimon became a director for the Matzlawi Construction Company, Ltd., a public company in the real estate and construction field. Maimon is also an advisory board member of the Israeli fund, 2i-Dual Impact Ventures, a collaboration between DDR&D (Hebrew: MAFAT) and Altshuler-Shaham, a financial asset manager.

== Israeli Presidential Conference ==
Maimon was chairman of the Israeli Presidential Conference Steering Committee for the annual international conference, 'Facing Tomorrow,' held under the auspices of then-President Shimon Peres. The Steering Committee coordinated and brought to fruition the three-day conference, with Maimon dealing with content development, fundraising and the general running and implementation of the conference.

== Israel Bonds ==
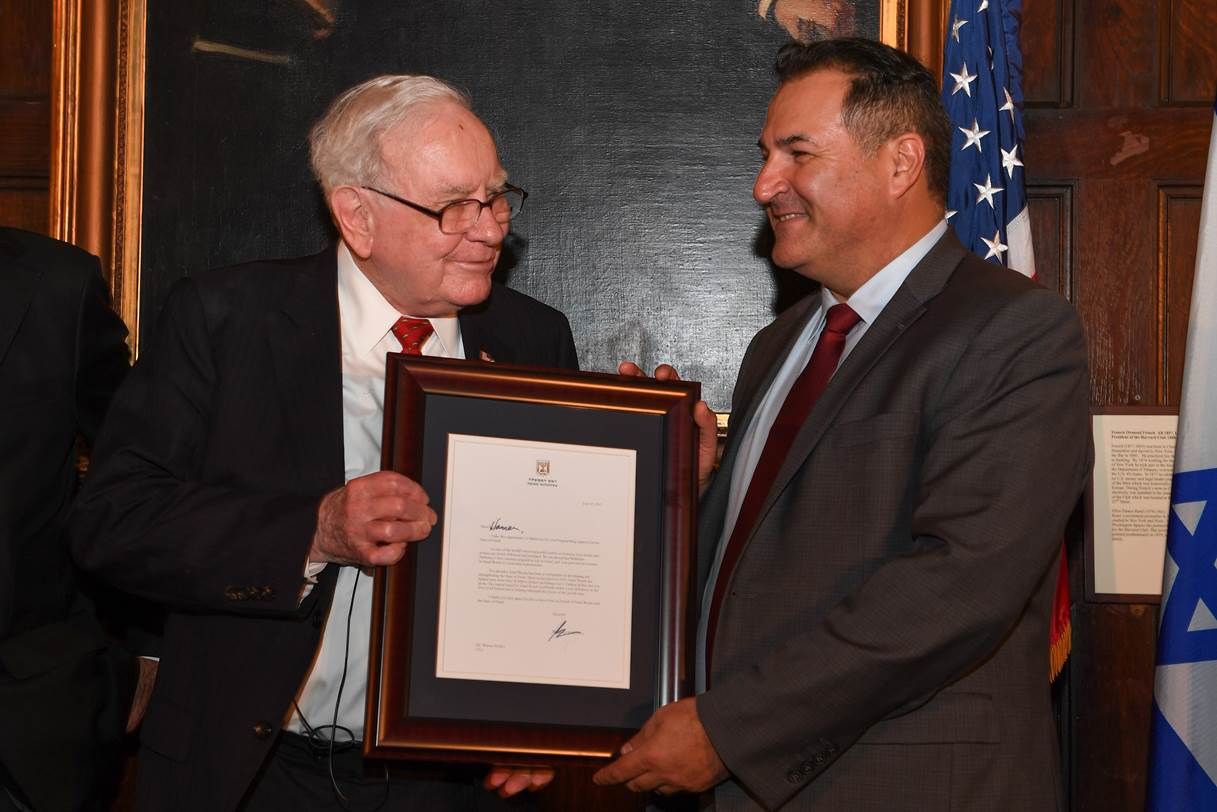
Maimon with Warren Buffett

In 2016, then-Finance Minister Moshe Kahlon asked Maimon to become president & CEO of Israel Bonds, officially assuming the role October 14, 2016. In accepting the position, Maimon said, "The most important thing is securing the future of the world’s only Jewish state. Since then, it has generated over $8 billion in worldwide sales. From the inception of the Israel Bonds program in 1951, total worldwide sales have surpassed $48 billion. Investors in Israel bonds include Warren Buffett, who participated in three Israel Bonds events during Maimon's time as president & CEO. In March 2020, Maimon held discussions with officials from Israel's Finance Ministry, proposing a four-point plan to increase the organization’s 2020 U.S. sales goal to $1.5 billion - $400 million beyond what had initially been agreed on. By October, U.S. sales reached the $1.5 billion objective. By year's end, worldwide sales, which included the U.S., were $1.8 billion. Finance Ministry Accountant General Yali Rothenberg observed, "Last year, when COVID-19 seemed to change everything, we in the Finance Ministry knew there was one thing that would stay steady and strong, and that was Israel Bonds." Maimon oversaw the development of e-commerce sites for Canada and internationally, facilitating increased online sales and cost benefits for Israel’s Finance Ministry.

He also strengthened corporate digital marketing strategies via heightened promotion of the Israel Bonds app, prioritizing social media outreach and overseeing twice-yearly digital media campaigns. Initiatives Maimon put in place include the Online Museum of Israel Bonds, as well as the mentorship program, created to prepare young Jewish men and women to assume future Israel Bonds leadership responsibilities. He designated 2019 ‘The Year of the Lay Leader,’ culminating with a conference in Phoenix themed 'Perpetuating a Legacy of Leadership'. The conference was attended by Bonds leaders from the U.S., Canada, Latin America and Europe.

Maimon noted, “One of our biggest accomplishments is that we are putting a focus on increasing the number of purchasers — we are molding more individuals to support the State of Israel, whether it’s through $36 online or $2 million." After leaving Israel Bonds, Maimon became founder and CEO of Blue and White Capital in New York.

== Awards and recognition ==
In January 2023, Maimon was awarded an honorary degree by the College of Management Academic Studies in Tel Aviv.
