= Shalom Shlomo =

Nuclear physicist (born 1943)

- Born: 1943 (age 82–83); Aden, Yemen
- Occupations: Nuclear physicist, academic, and author
- Awards: Eminent Scientist Award, The Institute of Physical and Chemical Research (RIKEN), Japan (2000); S. Davydov Award, Ukrainian Academy of Sciences (2011)

Academic background
- Education: BSc in Physics; MSc in Nuclear Physics; PhD in Nuclear Physics
- Alma mater: Hebrew University of Jerusalem; Weizmann Institute of Science in Rehovot
- Thesis: Coulomb Energies and Charge Distributions in Nuclei (1973)

Academic work
- Institutions: Texas A&M University (TAMU)

Shalom Shlomo is a nuclear physicist, academic, and author. He is a Senior Scientist and Group Leader at the Cyclotron Institute of the Texas A&M University (TAMU).

Shlomo's research delves into the microscopic theory of nuclear structure and reactions, focusing on both static and dynamic properties of nuclei as many-body systems, with his publications including journal papers and the book Mean Field Theory, co-authored with Vladimir M. Kolomietz. He has been awarded the S. Davydov Award from the Ukrainian Academy of Sciences and the Eminent Scientist Award from The Institute of Physical and Chemical Research (RIKEN), Japan.

Shlomo has been a Fellow and Chartered Physicist of the Institute of Physics since 2001 and a Fellow of the American Physical Society since 2008.

== Education ==
Shlomo completed his B.Sc. in physics with a major in mathematics from the Hebrew University of Israel from 1961 to 1964. He then pursued an M.Sc. in Nuclear Physics from the Hebrew University of Jerusalem in Israel in 1966, with a thesis titled "Shell-Model Binding Energies of Nuclei in the Zr Region," under the supervision of Nissan Zeldes. He obtained his Ph.D. in Nuclear Physics from the Weizmann Institute of Science in Rehovot Israel in 1973, with his doctoral thesis "Coulomb Energies and Charge Distributions in Nuclei," supervised by Igal Talmi.

== Career ==
Shlomo was a research associate at the Michigan State University in E. Lansing from 1973 to 1975. Following this, from 1976 to 1978, he was a Minerva Fellow at the Max Planck Institute of Nuclear Physics in Heidelberg, Germany, and served as a senior lecturer at the Hebrew University in Jerusalem, Israel, from 1979 to 1980, and then joined TAMU in 1981, initially as a research scientist at the Cyclotron Institute until 1983. Concurrently, he held positions in the Physics Department, starting as a visiting assistant in 1981, then becoming an associate in 1983, and a professor in 1985, continuing for a year until 1986. Since 1984, he has been serving as a senior scientist and group leader at the Cyclotron Institute at Texas A&M University.

== Research ==
Shlomo's research in theoretical nuclear physics developed quantum and semi-classical approximations to study nuclei's static and dynamic properties, with contributions to nuclear structure, and reactions, and collaborations with theorists and experimentalists. His work has covered topics like shell-model spectroscopy, Coulomb displacement energies, giant resonances, nuclear matter's equation of state, and heavy-ion collisions. In 2020, he co-authored the book Mean Field Theory with Vladimir M. Kolomietz, which explored the theoretical and experimental advancements in understanding the static and dynamic properties of atomic nuclei and many-body systems of strongly interacting neutrons and protons using concepts such as the mean field and beyond.

=== Nuclear spectroscopy ===
Shlomo's contributions to nuclear spectroscopy involve microscopic investigations of nuclear spectra using the shell model and collective models to understand energy levels, electric and magnetic moments, and transitions. His study highlighted shell model calculations, the development of new sum rules, and insights into the Interacting Boson Model. In related research, he also used the simulated annealing method to optimize Skyrme parameter values for effective nucleon-nucleon interactions by fitting them to extensive experimental data on nuclear properties.

=== Coulomb displacement energies (CDE) and nucleon distributions ===
Shlomo's work addressed the Coulomb energy problem, specifically the Nolen-Schiffer anomaly (NSA), where mean-field approaches calculate CDE to be about 7% lower than experimental values. He performed microscopic calculations of CDE, and charge radii, examining various correction terms such as center-of-mass motion, finite size effects, charge symmetry breaking (CSB), and long correlations (LRC). His findings linked CDE to neutron-proton radius differences, and confirmed that relativistic mean-field calculations for CDE are consistent with non-relativistic Skyrme Hartree-Fock results. He also found that the contributions due to CSB and LRC resolved the NSA discrepancy.

=== Semi-classical methods ===
Shlomo also worked on quantum mechanical theory and semi-classical approximations using the Wigner phase space distribution function. He explored the expressions for the Wigner Transform and the Pauli blocking factor, introducing one-way current for studying heavy ion collisions, assessing the accuracy of level density approximations, and deriving the pressure and equation of state for finite nuclei using the extended Thomas-Fermi approximation.

=== Nuclear energy density functional ===
Shlomo developed and applied a modern nuclear energy density functional (EDF) to describe the properties of nuclei and nuclear matter. Using the simulated annealing method, he determined the parameters of the Skyrme type nucleon-nucleon interaction by fitting an extensive set of experimental data on binding energies, radii, and isoscalar giant monopole energies, while imposing constraints like Landau's stability conditions. Additionally, he used 33 energy density functionals to perform Hartree-Fock based random phase approximation calculations of isoscalar and isovector giant resonances, deducing constraints on nuclear matter properties. Building upon his work on nuclear energy density, a consistency with experimental data was revealed by the Hartree-Fock calculations of neutron skin thickness and RPA of the electric dipole polarizability of 208Pb, challenging previous literature. He also reviewed the incompressibility coefficient 𝐾 of symmetric nuclear matter, vital for understanding the equation of state near the saturation point, using experimental data on nuclear compression modes analyzed through microscopic RPA theory.

== Awards and honors ==
- 2000 – Eminent Scientist Award, The Institute of Physical and Chemical Research (RIKEN), Japan
- 2001 – Kreitman Senior Scholar Fellow Award, Ben-Gurion University, Israel
- 2011 – S. Davydov Award, Ukrainian Academy of Sciences
- 2016 – Weston Award, Weizmann Institute of Sciences, Israel

== Bibliography ==
=== Books ===
- Mean Field Theory (2020) ISBN 978-981-12-1177-5

=== Selected articles ===
- Shlomo, S., & Bertsch, G. (1975). Nuclear response in the continuum. Nuclear Physics A, 243(3), 507–518.
- Shlomo, S., Kolomietz, V. M., & Colo, G. (2006). Deducing the nuclear-matter incompressibility coefficient from data on isoscalar compression modes. The European Physical Journal A-Hadrons and Nuclei, 30, 23–30.
- Agrawal, B. K., Shlomo, S., & Au, V. K. (2005). Determination of the parameters of a Skyrme type effective interaction using the simulated annealing approach. Physical Review C—Nuclear Physics, 72(1), 014310.
- Shlomo, S., & Youngblood, D. H. (1993). Nuclear matter compressibility from isoscalar giant monopole resonance. Physical Review C, 47(2), 529.
- Shlomo, S., & Natowitz, J. B. (1991). Temperature and mass dependence of level density parameter. Physical Review C, 44(6), 2878.
