= Dan Seals (politician) =

American politician (born 1971)

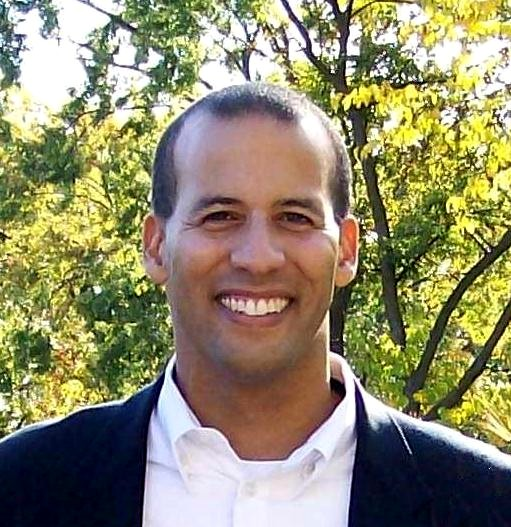
- Seals in 2008
- Born: June 19, 1971 (age 55); Chicago, Illinois, U.S.
- Education: University of Chicago (MBA); Johns Hopkins University (MA); Boston University (BA)
- Political party: Democratic
- Spouse: Mia Seals
- Children: 3

Daniel Joseph Seals (born June 19, 1971) is an American business consultant and a Democratic politician from Illinois. Seals was the Democratic nominee in three campaigns to become U.S. Representative for Illinois's 10th congressional district. In 2006 and 2008, he was defeated by the incumbent Mark Kirk. In his third run, he was defeated by Republican candidate Robert Dold, on November 2, 2010, after Kirk vacated the seat to successfully run for the U.S. Senate.

== Early life, education and career ==
Daniel Joseph Seals was born on June 19, 1971, in Chicago, Illinois to George Seals, a former Chicago Bears football player, and a social worker. Both of his parents are of mixed-raced ancestry. His parents divorced and Seals was primarily raised by his mother in Hyde Park. He graduated from Kenwood Academy High School in 1989. He holds a bachelor's degree in journalism from Boston University, a master's degree in International Economics and Japanese Studies from the Johns Hopkins School of Advanced International Studies and an MBA from the University of Chicago. He and his wife Mia live in Wilmette with their three daughters.

After receiving his bachelor's degree Seals taught English in Japan from 1993 to 1995. From 1997 to 1998 he was a Presidential Management Intern (PMI), working as an aide to the Assistant Secretary of Commerce and as an aide to Senator Joe Lieberman. He worked in marketing at Sprint from 2001 to 2003 and was Director of Marketing with General Electric Commercial Finance from 2003 until he took a leave of absence to run for Congress in 2005.

In 2009, Seals did consulting work for Civic Consulting Alliance and The Point, an online service that helps charities and public campaigns with fundraising. He also served as a lecturer at Northwestern University in Evanston, Illinois.

In 2011, Seals was appointed by Illinois Governor Pat Quinn to be assistant director of the Illinois Department of Commerce and Economic Opportunity.

== Campaigns for Congress ==
=== 2006 ===
Seals ran against Winnetka attorney and former Park Board Commissioner Zane Smith for the Democratic nomination in the 10th Congressional district. Smith highlighted Seals' lack of experience in prior elected office and his location outside the 10th district boundary. Ultimately the better financed Seals prevailed, winning 71% to 29%.

Following his primary win Seals faced three-term incumbent Congressman Mark Kirk. He focused on popular dissatisfaction with the Iraq war and the scandals plaguing several Republican members of Congress. He also attempted to tie Kirk to national Republicans, claiming that he voted with the Republican majority 80% of the time. Kirk focused on local issues and argued that he broke from the Republican Party on several issues such as gun control, stem cell research and abortion. Seals came closer than the Democratic candidates in 2002 and 2004, but ultimately lost to Kirk 53% to 47%.

After his 2006 loss to Kirk, Seals listed his occupation as "business consultant". He also taught a course in public policy at Northwestern University school for continuing education in the spring of 2008.

=== 2008 ===
Seals announced in June 2007 that he would be running for Congress in the 10th district again. In the primary election he faced Jay Footlik, a former Clinton administration official. Seals was endorsed by U.S. Senator Dick Durbin. Footlik raised the residency issue again during a Chicago Tribune editorial board interview, to which Seals replied: "If I was a millionaire I could certainly just pick up and buy a new home, [but] I'm not a millionaire, and if you want more millionaires in Congress, I'm not your man." The United States Constitution requires that candidates for Congress be residents of the state from which they are elected, but does not require district residency. Seals' home lies 0.3 miles outside of the 10th district, in the 9th which is represented by Jan Schakowsky. Footlik contended that Seals didn't deserve another chance because he lost to Kirk by six points in a good Democratic year, while Seals argued he had superior name recognition. On February 5, 2008, Seals won the primary with 81% of the vote.

Kirk and Seals both raised large sums of money. The race was considered one of the most competitive in the country; Illinois Senator Barack Obama was the Democratic nominee for president and was expected to carry the district easily.

In the general election, Seals once again lost to Kirk 53% to 47%, despite Obama winning the district by over 20 points.

Following the 2008 general election, it was reported that Seals was being considered by Illinois Lieutenant Governor Pat Quinn to replace Obama in the United States Senate if Governor Rod Blagojevich were to be removed from office. However, Blagojevich made the appointment, and chose former State Attorney General Roland Burris.

=== 2010 ===
In July 2009, Seals announced that he would be running a third time for Illinois's 10th congressional district. Kirk chose to retire in order to run for Obama's seat in the U.S. Senate. Seals narrowly defeated state representative Julie Hamos in the Democratic primary, and faced Republican businessman Bob Dold in the general election.

Seals was endorsed for the general election campaign by the Joint Action Committee (JACPAC) which supports a strong US-Israel relationship; pro-choice organizations NARAL and Planned Parenthood; environmental organizations Sierra Club and League of Conservation Voters; and labor unions including Illinois Federation of Teachers, Associated Fire Fighters of Illinois, SEIU, UAW Region 4, Illinois AFL-CIO and Communications Workers of District 4. Kirk had been endorsed by the Sierra Club, the League of Conservation Voters and Planned Parenthood in 2006 and 2008.

In October, Seals was endorsed by the Chicago Sun-Times and suburban newspapers the Daily Herald, Lake County News-Sun, and Pioneer Press

Seals lost to Dold 51%-49%.
