= 2024 leak of U.S. intelligence on Israeli strike plans =

2024 leak about Israel–Iran conflict

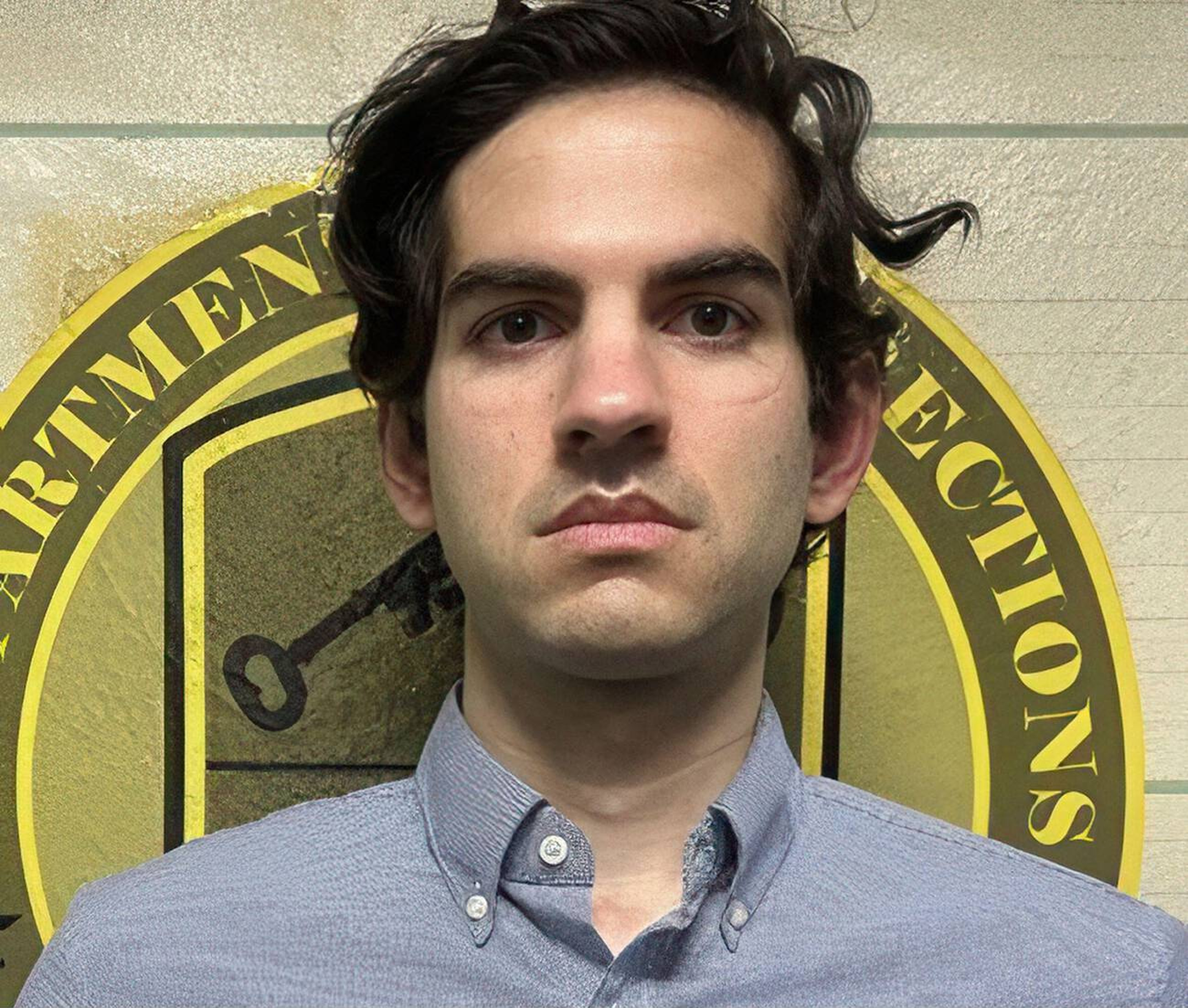
Guam Department of Corrections mugshot of leaker Asif Rahman

CIA analyst Asif Rahman leaked classified U.S. intelligence documents detailing Israel's preparations for a retaliatory strike against Iran to the Telegram channel Middle East Spectator, which disseminated them on 18 October 2024. The materials originated from the National Security Agency (NSA) and the National Geospatial-Intelligence Agency (NGA) and included satellite imagery analysis, Israeli Air Force exercise plans, drone strike routes, and the relocation of advanced munitions. One document referenced Israel's alleged possession of nuclear weapons, marking the first official U.S. acknowledgment of a capability long suspected by the international community but never confirmed by either government. The leak underscored close U.S. intelligence collaboration with Israel, including satellite surveillance of Israeli military activity, while exposing sensitive data shared within the Five Eyes alliance (FVEY).

Security officials confirmed the documents' authenticity, noting parallels to prior leaks by Jack Teixeira during the Russo-Ukrainian War. The breach drew condemnation from U.S. officials as a "deeply concerning" national security risk, while Israeli authorities privately acknowledged the severity of the compromise. Analysts warned of strained U.S.–Israel relations amid ongoing tensions with Iran and its proxies, citing risks to intelligence-sharing frameworks.

== Leak ==
On 18 October 2024, classified U.S. documents were posted to a Telegram channel "Middle East Spectator". The documents were dated to 15 and 16 October 2024. The user who posted the documents claimed that they were leaked by a member of the United States Intelligence Community, later claiming that they were a member of the United States Department of Defense. Three United States security officials reported the leak to The Associated Press, and a fourth official evaluated the documents as most likely being authentic.

=== Contents ===
The two documents detailed measures taken by Israel to prepare for a retaliatory strike against Iran for its strikes on Israeli military bases in October 2024. Measures included the rearranging and relocation of advanced munitions and military assets needed to conduct the strikes, detailed plans for Israeli drone routes and strikes against Iranian targets, as well as a large exercise conducted by the Israeli Air Force potentially using fighter jets with intelligence planes, as well as air-to-surface missiles. One of the documents suggested the presence of nuclear weapons in Israel's arsenal. Both documents were labelled as "Top Secret" and "NOFORN" (not releasable to foreign nationals), although certain information within the documents was shared between security officials in the U.S., Canada, Great Britain, Australia, and New Zealand as part of the Five Eyes (FVEY) intelligence alliance.

One of the documents was an alleged National Geospatial-Intelligence Agency (NGA) Visual Intelligence report that had been distributed in the week prior to the leak consisting entirely of satellite image analysis. A leaked document was noted to be similar in style to other NGA documents leaked by Air National Guardsman Jack Teixeira regarding the Russo-Ukrainian war in March 2024.

According to the leak, the US noted that the Israeli Air Force was handling ALBMs including 16 Golden Horizons and at least 40 ROCKS located at the Hatzerim Airbase since October 8.

=== Analysis ===
Axios reporter Barak Ravid stated that a possible motive for the leak was to disrupt or delay Israel's retaliation against Iran, and that the documents themselves indicated that United States intelligence was very closely involved with aiding Israel in its detailed preparations to attack Iran. The documents also indicated the use of United States satellites to spy on and gather information on Israeli Air Force operations, contributing to the seriousness of the security breach.

CNN reporters Natasha Bertrand and Alex Marquardt noted that the data breaches would likely bring anger from Israel against the United States at a period where mutual diplomatic relations have been complicated during the Gaza war and associated conflicts with Iranian proxies. Retired CIA officer and former Middle East security official Mick Mulroy stated that confirmation of the documents' authenticity could challenge future ties and cooperation between Israel and the United States due to a fundamental breach in trust.

== Responses ==
The Pentagon and the Office of the Director of National Intelligence both noted the leak of the classified documents, but did not elaborate further. The Federal Bureau of Investigation refused to comment on the leak. An anonymous United States official called the leak "deeply concerning".

The Israel Defense Forces did not comment on the leak of the classified documents. A senior Israel official reported that the Israel Defense Forces were aware of the leak, and that they were taking the breach "very seriously".

=== Investigation ===
United States security officials quickly began an investigation into the nature of the leak, including how the documents had been obtained and shared as well as the identity and background of the people involved with the leak. The investigation also worked to determine if the leaker was a part of the U.S. government, if the leak was obtained by a hack or data breach, and if any other confidential information had been obtained and placed at risk for being shared to public or hostile parties.

Asif William Rahman (born 18 September 1990), a CIA analyst with top-secret clearance, was indicted on 7 November 2024 and arrested by the FBI as he arrived to work in Cambodia on 12 November. He was then transported to Guam. Rahman, a Yale University graduate and Cincinnati, Ohio native, had worked for the CIA since 2016. Rahman illegally downloaded and printed classified documents, then took them home, where he altered the items to obfuscate the source. Beginning in the spring of 2024, he began distributing the documents.

Rahman pleaded guilty in a Virginia federal court on 17 January 2025 to two counts of unlawfully retaining and transmitting classified defense information. He was sentenced to 37 months in prison.

== See also ==
- United States government group chat leak
- 2024 Israeli secret document leak scandal
- German Taurus leak
- 2022–2023 Pentagon document leaks
- Afghanistan Papers
- Palestine Papers
- United States diplomatic cables leak
- Twelve Day War
- 2026 Iran War
