= Nataliya Kalashnykova =

Russian-Mexican mathematician

Nataliya Ivanovna Kalashnykova is a Soviet and Mexican mathematician specializing in mathematical optimization, and especially bilevel optimization, with applications in modeling human migration and in the pricing of natural gas and toll roads. She is a professor at the Autonomous University of Nuevo León, in the Facultad de Ciencias Físico Matemáticas.

== Education and career ==
Kalashnykova earned a master's degree in mathematical sciences from Novosibirsk State University in 1978. She completed a doctorate there in 1989, through the Siberian Division of the Academy of Sciences of the USSR. Her dissertation, Control of Accuracy in Bi-Level Iteration Processes, was supervised by Vladimir Aleksandrovich Bulavsky. She also earned a second master's degree in economics from Sumy State University in Ukraine in 1999.

She became a faculty member at the Altai State Technical University, at the Siberian State University of Telecommunications and Informatics in Novosibirsk, and at Sumy State University, and a postdoctoral researcher at the Central Economic Mathematical Institute. She moved to her present position in Mexico at the Autonomous University of Nuevo León in 2001.

== Recognition ==
Kalashnykova is a member of the Mexican Academy of Sciences.

== Personal life ==
Kalashnykova is married to Vyacheslav Kalashnikov Polishchuk, another former Soviet mathematician in Mexico.

== Books ==
Kalashnykova is a coauthor of books including:

- Bilevel Programming Problems: Theory, Algorithms and Applications to Energy Networks (with Stephan Dempe, Vyacheslav Kalashnikov, and Gerardo A. Pérez-Valdés, Springer, 2015)
- Public Interest and Private Enterprize [sic]: New Developments: Theoretical Results and Numerical Algorithms (with José Guadalupe Flores Muñiz, Viacheslav V. Kalashnikov, and Vladik Kreinovich, Lecture Notes in Networks and Systems 138, Springer, 2021)
