= Qatari connection affair =

2025 Israeli political scandal

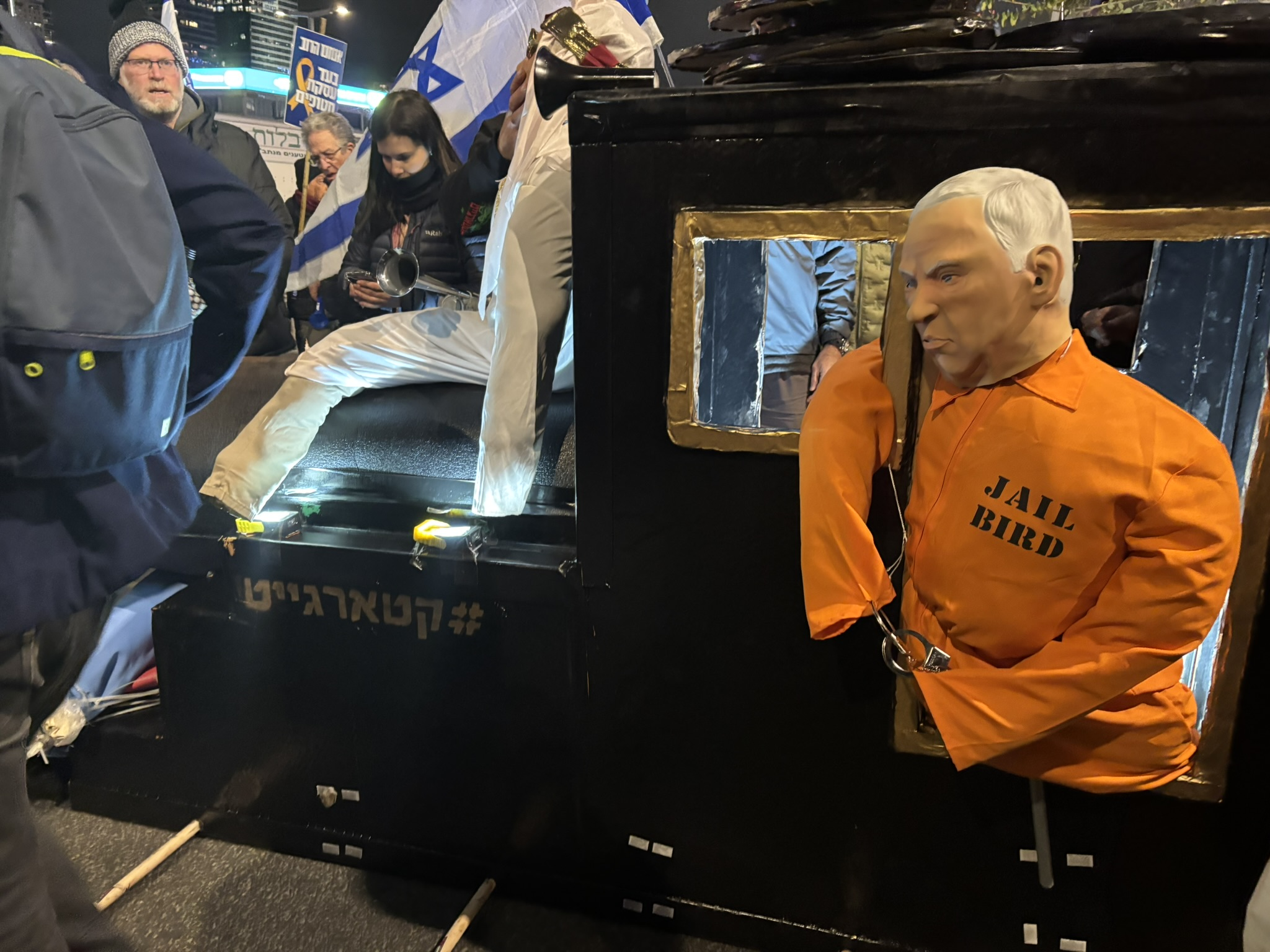
A protest against Netanyahu in background of "Qatargate" investigations, 2025

The Qatari connection affair, more commonly known as Qatargate (Hebrew: קטארגייט), is a political affair in Israel centered on the allegation that close advisors to Prime Minister Benjamin Netanyahu, as well as a lieutenant colonel in the reserves, were paid by representatives of the government of Qatar, an ally and financial supporter of Hamas, to promote its interests in the country. In March 2025, Shin Bet chief Ronen Bar affirmed that the agency was investigating the affair, which he described as complex and multi-faceted. The scandal has resulted in the arrests of at least two of Netanyahu's top aides for unlawful ties to Qatar.

The investigation is being conducted by Shin Bet and Israel Police.

== Background ==
In July 2024, the Middle East Media Research Institute (MEMRI) released two leaked documents from surveillance initiative Project Raven, allegedly detailing planned cash payments from Qatar of up to $50 million intended for the Likud party, to be delivered directly to Netanyahu. A Likud spokesperson vehemently denied the reports.

== Events ==
On 10 February 2025, Ofer Hadad reported on Channel 12 that the closest advisors to Israeli Prime Minister Benjamin Netanyahu, which included Yisrael Einhorn, Ofer Golan, Jonatan Urich, and Eli Feldstein (who had already been arrested prior to the publication, due to his involvement in the theft and leak of classified documents,) were employed by the Qatari government, to promote Qatari interests, including the image of Qatar, in the top political and security authorities of Israel. The journalist Nir Dvori wrote that he had often received reports from Feldstein that promoted Qatar's image, but refused to publish them.

Following the publication, opposition leader Yair Lapid called for an investigation into Qatar's reported actions and called it "a clear detriment" to Israeli security. The chairman of The Democrats, Yair Golan, separately requested an investigation into Netanyahu and his staff, with Golan calling the actions "treason" against Israel.

On 15 February, the Shin Bet responded to inquiries by MKs Gilad Kariv and Naama Lazimi, stating that it would investigate the revealing of Israeli state secrets. On 27 February, Gali Baharav-Miara, the Attorney General of Israel, instructed the Shin Bet and the Police of Israel to open an investigation.

On 13 March, Nadav Argaman, a former Shin Bet chief, told Yonit Levi on Channel 12 news, that if he concluded that the prime minister would decide to act against the law, then he would disclose everything he knew. As a consequence, Netanyahu complained to the Israeli police against Argaman, accusing him of blackmailing him. On 16 March 2025 the police started an investigation into Argaman's statements.

On 23 March, Baharav-Miara wrote a letter to the government about the intention to depose her.

=== Dismissal of the Shin Bet chief ===
On 5 March 2025, the Shin Bet said in a report that the agency had failed to prevent the October 7 attacks, while also blaming the policies of the ruling government. On 16 March 2025, Netanyahu claimed that Ronen Bar would be dismissed in the next cabinet meeting. Baharav-Miara wrote a letter to Netanyahu stating that the decision was not valid due to Netanyahu being in a conflict of Interest stemming from Shin Bet's role in the Qatargate investigation.

On 17 March, Yair Golan said that the reason of dismissal of the head of the Shin Bet was clear: the Qatargate investigation and the unwillingness to make a comprehensive hostage deal, which would end the war in Gaza. About sixty Israeli protest leaders, including Karine Nahon, Shikma Bressler and Moshe Radman, gathered for a meeting. Several media outlets wrote that the dismissal would prompt accusations against the Netanyahu government for authoritarian behavior. On 21 March 2025, the high court in Israel issued an injunction to prevent the dismissal.

On 31 March, Netanyahu announced that Eli Sharvit would be appointed as the Shin Bet chief. The United States senator Lindsey Graham stated that the appointment was undesirable because of Sharvit's statements against President Donald Trump. MKs Tally Gotliv and Nissim Vaturi claimed that Sharvit participated in the protest against the government, and his appointment was revoked after several hours.

=== Investigation ===
On 19 March, Urich and Feldstein were investigated by the police. Their names were revealed after 48 hours.

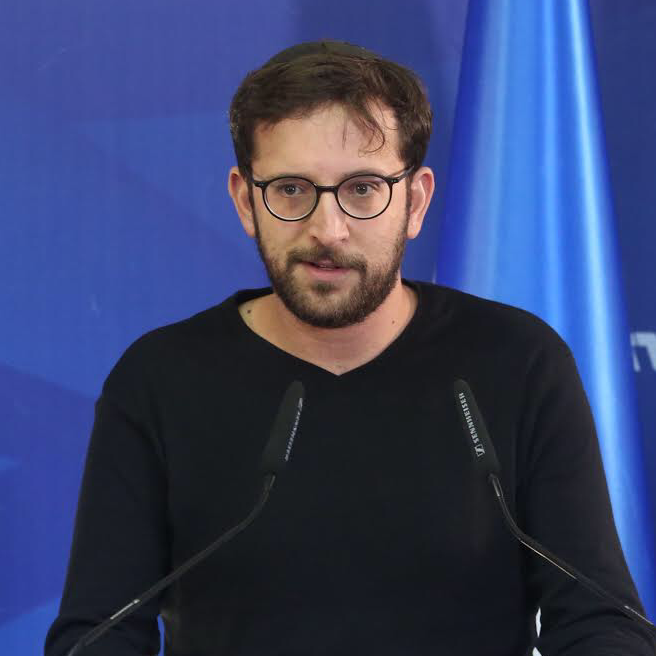
Jonatan Urich, a main suspect in the affair

On 31 March, it was announced that Urich and Feldstein were arrested. They are accused of contact with a foreign agent, receiving bribes, fraud, breach of trust and money laundering. Feldstein found employment at an international firm which was contracted by Qatar to feed pro-Qatar stories to Israeli journalists, while Urich is suspected of having a role with business figures and other officials who were involved in the transferring of payments from Doha which were then covered up in effort to prevent knowledge of their origin. Jerusalem Post editor-in-chief Zvika Klein was also arrested for a suspected connection with a foreign agent, who mediated between the advisors and the lobbyist Jay Footlik. Prime Minister Netanyahu himself was questioned in connection with the case on 31 March.

A fourth suspect, Yisrael Einhorn, is currently serving as an adviser to President of Serbia Aleksandar Vučić, and has not returned to Israel since the affair went public.

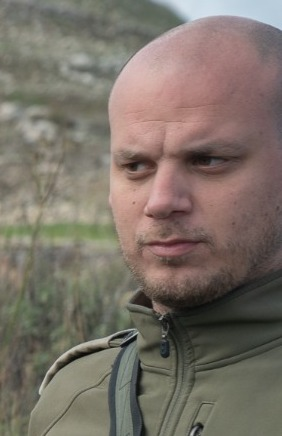
Eli Feldstein

On 1 April, Judge Menahem Mizrahi, of the Rishon LeZion magistrate court, issued a brief summary surrounding the case, saying there was a “reasonable suspicion” that the factual situation he described was well-founded. According to the same summary, an American lobbying company called The Third Circle, owned by Footlik, formed a direct connection with Urich for Urich to disseminate positive messages in the Israeli media regarding Qatar's role as a facilitator in the hostage deal negotiations between Israel and Hamas, and to spread negative messaging about Egypt's role in the negotiations.

On 5 April, businessman David Saig was questioned by Israel Police from Lahav 433 over a suspected connection to the affair.

On 22 April, Urich and Feldstein were released to house arrest. The Israeli police appealed the decision due to evidence of "obstruction of legal proceedings".

On 24 April, the Tel Aviv District Court overturned the decision to release Urich and Feldstein, citing new evidence against them and concerns about obstruction of the investigation. The court extended their detention until 8 May 2025.

On 8 May, the police presented newly obtained evidence tracing payments between Urich and Feldstein back to Qatari sources. The court was informed that suspicions against Urich had "significantly strengthened", including concerns about obstructing the investigation, which ultimately led to Urich's re-arrest.

On 9 May, the Israeli Supreme Court dismissed Urich's appeal against his continued detention. Justice Yechiel Kasher ruled there had been no miscarriage of justice in the lower-court decision and ordered that Urich remain in custody until 12 May 2025.

Lahav 433 investigators traveled to Serbia on 23 July 2025 and questioned Einhorn. Einhorn said that he was "misled" into believing that the leaking of the documents was sanctioned and added that Urich was not involved in Qatargate.

The key Qatari figure involved has been identified as Hamad bin Thamer Al Thani.

The restrictions in place against Urich were lifted on 15 August by Rishon LeZion magistrate court judge Mizrahi, though the Israeli police appealed the decision on 17 August. The Lod District Court upheld the appeal on 18 August.

Opposition leader Yair Lapid testified in the case, at the request of the Israeli police, on 27 August 2025. The same day, an arrest warrant for Footlik was issued by Israeli police.

The Israeli police requested in September that the magistrate court not allow Urich to work in the prime minister's office, though the request was denied. The police appealed on 12 September to the Lod District Court. The district court accepted the appeal on 18 September, preventing Urich from working in the prime minister's office, or contacting anyone else involved in Qatargate, and marks the fifth time that Lod District Court judge Amit Michles has overturned a Qatargate-related decision by the Rishon LeZion Magistrate Court.

The ban lapsed after a year, with 6 January 2026 marking the first time that Netanyahu and Urich had spoken since. The Lod District Court turned down an appeal to reimpose the ban related to the Qatargate case, as it was not filed with enough time to allow judicial review, though the ban regarding the leaked documents case will remain in force.

In April 2026, Ofer Golan, a longtime spokesman and close advisor to Benjamin Netanyahu, announced his resignation after nearly a decade of service. Although the departure was officially described as a mutual decision, some reports suggest it came amid ongoing legal and political pressure related to Netanyahu's trial on corruption charges.

It was confirmed in August 2026 that Mossad director Roman Gofman would not be investigating the case, due to his close ties to the suspects, as he served as military secretary for the PMO from May of 2024 until June 2026.

=== Response ===
On 31 March 2025, Netanyahu issued a video and claimed that the arrests of Urich and Feldstein were intended to prevent the firing of Bar. Netanyahu's description of his staff as hostages sparked a backlash from the Israeli families of the hostages in Gaza.

On 4 April, Netanyahu's lawyers sued Yair Golan for defamation, demanding 320,000 shekels ($86,500) in compensation. According to the lawyers, the lawsuit came in response to an announcement Golan made a few days prior regarding the investigation into Qatargate.

== Reactions ==
- Egypt – Egyptian members of parliament and journalists attacked Qatar on Twitter, accusing them of tarnishing Egypt's reputation and its role as mediator on the hostage deal negotiations.
- Qatar – The Qatari government condemned reports suggesting that "Doha paid in order to undermine Egypt's standing or that of any other mediator involved in the ongoing negotiations between Hamas and Israel". On 27 April 2025, Qatar's PM dismissed the existence of the affair, calling it "propaganda".
- United States – Michael Herzog, the former Israeli Ambassador to the United States, expressed concern over the Qatargate affair. The Foundation for Defense of Democracies expressed similar concern.
