= Avraham Sinai =

Lebanese Jewish convert and Israeli spy

Avraham Sinai אברהם סיני
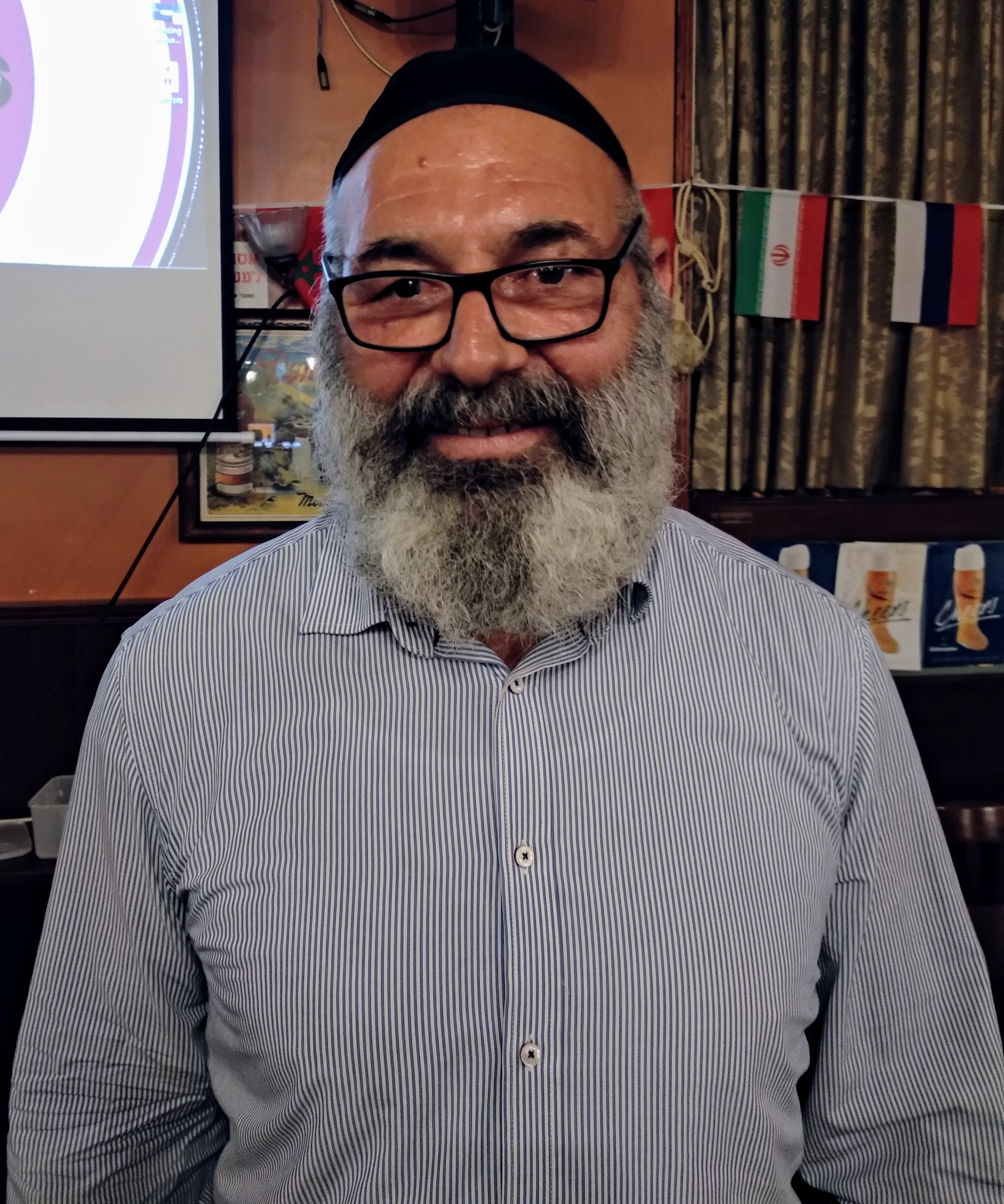
- Sinai in 2018
- Born: Ibrahim Yassin; 15 December 1962; Beqaa Valley, Lebanon
- Children: 7
- Espionage activity
- Allegiance: Israel
- Agency: Mossad,IDF
- Service years: 1983–1997

Avraham Sinai (Hebrew: אברהם סיני; born December 15, 1962) is a former Hezbollah member who spied for Israel. Originally named Ibrahim Yassin (Arabic: إبراهيم ياسين), he fled from Lebanon to Israel in 1997. After relocating to Israel, he converted from Shia Islam to Orthodox Judaism and settled in Safed.

== Life in Lebanon ==
Sinai was born Ibrahim Yassin in a Shi'ite village in eastern Lebanon in 1964. During the Lebanese Civil War, his family was affiliated with the South Lebanese Army.

Sinai became disillusioned with the actions of Palestinian militant groups and the Syrian Army during the Lebanese Civil War. According to Sinai Palestinian militants had tied his daughter between two cars, then drove the cars in opposite directions.

During the Israeli invasion of Lebanon in 1982, Sinai sought and received help from the Israel Defense Force (IDF) while his wife was giving birth. His wife was flown via helicopter to Rambam Hospital in Haifa, Israel. After this event, Sinai began providing information to Israel until he was caught by Hezbollah.

According to Sinai, Hezbollah members kidnapped, questioned, and tortured him. In an interview with the Times of Israel, he stated that future Hezbollah leader Imad Mughniyeh, then a young member of the organization, was his "chief tormentor," and burned his newborn in front of him. After his release, Sinai began more actively spying for Israel.

== Activities for Israel ==
For 10 years, Sinai passed information to the IDF via meetings along the Israel-Lebanon border. His primary handler in the IDF was Yoav Mordechai, future Coordinator of Government Activities in the Territories. He was considered an excellent agent for the information he provided to Israel. His role as an intelligence asset was later publicly verified by his former IDF handler, Major General Yoav Mordechai.

== Life in Israel ==
In 1997, Sinai was smuggled into Israel from Lebanon. His entire family, including his wife and seven children, settled in Safed.

After attending synagogue services on Yom Kippur in 2000, he decided to become a Jew. After years of study, His conversion was closely managed and supported by the Chief Rabbi of Safed, Shmuel Eliyahu, with whom Sinai developed a close relationship within the local community over subsequent decades. Sinai would eventually become a rabbi himself.

Sinai is the author of A Martyr from Lebanon: Life in the Shadow of Danger, which describes some of his experiences.

== Personal life ==
Four of Sinai's sons have joined the IDF. His son Amos served in the Golani Brigade and his son Haim was in the Givati Brigade. In May 2016, Sinai's son Amos (formerly Abbas), serving in the Golani Brigade of the IDF, received the Presidential Citation of Excellence from Israeli President Reuven Rivlin. During the ceremony, military officials highlighted the family's transition, and his former IDF handler, Major General Yoav Mordechai (then serving as COGAT commander), publicly commended Sinai's intelligence contributions.

== In popular culture ==
In 2019, Sinai's life and intelligence career became the subject of a feature-length documentary film titled The Rabbi from Hezbollah (Hebrew: האברך מהחיזבאללה), directed by Itamar Chen. The film premiered at the DocAviv International Film Festival and was broadcast nationally on Yes Docu. It featured archival footage alongside independent on-camera verification and interviews with his primary IDF Unit 504 intelligence handlers.
