= Jonatan Urich =

Israeli political consultant and communications adviser

- יונתן אוריך
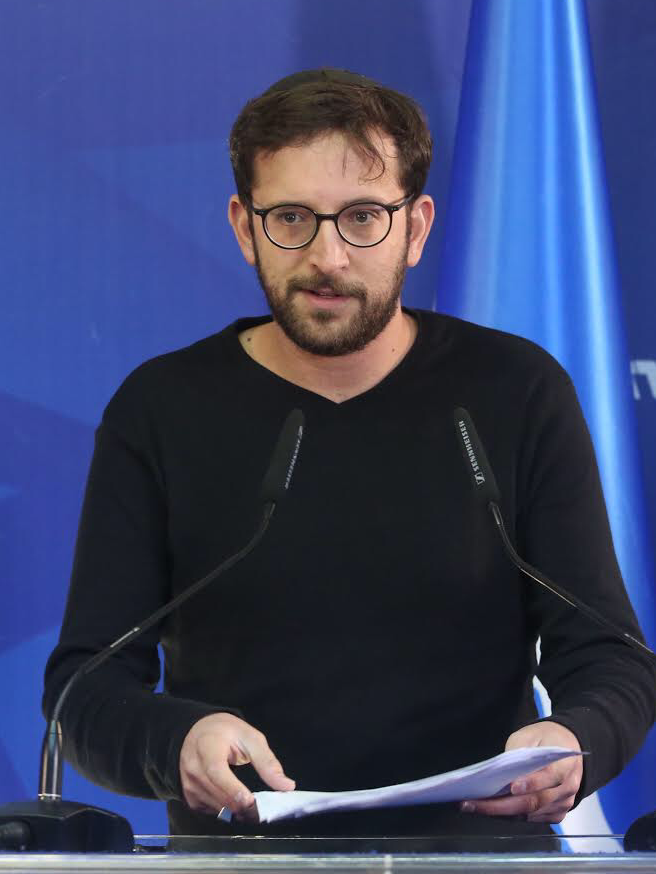
- Born: February 21, 1989 (age 37)
- Citizenship: Israel
- Occupations: Strategic advisor, political consultant, spokesperson

Jonatan Urich (Hebrew: יונתן אוריך) is an Israeli political consultant and communications adviser associated with Benjamin Netanyahu and the Likud party. He has served as Netanyahu's spokesperson and director of new media, advised Likud election campaigns, and worked as a strategic adviser to Netanyahu. He is also a partner in the Perception communications consulting firm.

Urich has been investigated in the Qatari connection affair, concerning alleged Qatari influence activities involving associates of Netanyahu, and in June 2026 he was indicted in the classified documents leak case on charges including transmitting secret information with intent to harm state security. Urich has disputed the allegations against him.

== Biography ==
Urich was born in Kfar Saba to a religious family; his father, Edward (Edi), was originally from Poland. In his youth he was a member of the Bnei Akiva movement and studied at Yeshivat Har Etzion. In his teens, he volunteered for Tzipi Livni's Kadima election campaign. He served in the IDF Spokesperson's Unit as editor of the IDF website for five years, and afterwards edited the Kipa news website and the Judaism section of NRG and was a reporter for Makor Rishon.

He previously served as Benjamin Netanyahu’s spokesman, as director of new media, and as a spokesperson for the Likud movement.

== Career ==
In 2015, at the age of 26, Urich was appointed head of the new media array and spokesman for Prime Minister Benjamin Netanyahu and spokesman of the Likud movement, at the request of Netanyahu's communications adviser Topaz Luk, with whom he had served in the IDF Spokesperson's Unit. In December 2019, Urich and Luk were ranked 29th on TheMarker magazine's list of the 100 most influential people, described as the team running Netanyahu's social media accounts.

Urich served as a strategic adviser to Netanyahu's Likud election campaigns between 2019 and 2022, working alongside Ofer Golan and Topaz Luk. In parallel, he worked with one of the parties in Albania. Since December 2020, he has been a partner in Yisrael Einhorn's Perception communications consulting firm. In 2022, it was reported that Urich and Einhorn provided communications and strategic advice to Ukrainian President Volodymyr Zelensky during the Russian invasion of Ukraine, and the business publication Ice included Urich in its 40 Under 40 list.

After the outbreak of the Gaza war in October 2023, Urich was reported to have shifted from party work toward advising Prime Minister Netanyahu. In 2026 it was reported that he had built for Benjamin and Sara Netanyahu, using the Anthropic artificial intelligence tool Claude, a media monitoring tool for use by the Likud campaign, which identifies mentions of them in real time and produces a media summary for the prime minister twice a day. In October 2026, an investigation by the Romanian website Snoop.ro reported that Urich and Einhorn had secretly worked that year for the Alliance for the Union of Romanians (AUR) party, preparing political messages and a communications strategy; AUR denied the report, stating that the two had never worked for the party and that no contract existed.

== Investigations and legal proceedings ==
=== Shlomo Filber witness intimidation case ===
In October 2019, Urich was questioned under caution on suspicion of harassing Shlomo Filber, the state witness in Case 4000, after activists drove by Filber's residence in a car with a loudspeaker system and broadcast messages against him. Police searched Urich's mobile phone without a court order; in 2022, the Supreme Court ruled that the search had been carried out unlawfully, but allowed new search warrants to be requested. In February 2025, Urich, Yisrael Einhorn and Ofer Golan were indicted on charges of witness harassment in the affair. In May 2026, Attorney General Gali Baharav-Miara ordered a stay of proceedings, citing the inability to secure the return of Einhorn, a central witness; the stay did not constitute an acquittal.

=== Classified documents leak to Bild ===
He was questioned in November 2024 on suspicion of telling Eli Feldstein to send classified material to Einhorn, who sent it to the German newspaper Bild.

In June 2026, Urich was indicted at the Tel Aviv District Court in the classified documents leak case, on charges of transmitting secret information with intent to harm state security, transmitting secret information, possession of secret information, and destruction of evidence, in connection with the leak of a classified document to the German newspaper Bild. The prosecution requested that he be barred from the Prime Minister's Office and from secure facilities, but the court ruled that Urich may continue working with Netanyahu.

=== Qatargate ===
In 2024 and 2025, reports emerged that Urich and Einhorn had been involved in public relations work to improve Qatar's image, including employment by a Qatar-funded firm to promote Doha's image in Israel during the Gaza war; Urich initially denied the allegations. In February 2025, the attorney general instructed the Shin Bet and the Israel Police to investigate, and on 31 March 2025 Urich was arrested on suspicion of offenses including contact with a foreign agent, bribery, fraud, breach of trust, and money laundering; he was later released to house arrest. In May 2025, Urich acknowledged that he had received money from Qatar, which he said was for work connected to the 2022 FIFA World Cup, and said: "I don't think I did anything immoral or unprofessional". Courts restricted Urich's work in the Prime Minister's Office during the investigation; in March 2026, an agreement with the prosecution allowed him to return to work there and resume contact with Netanyahu, on condition that they not discuss the investigations in his case.

== Legal issues ==
In February 2025, Israeli Channel 12 stated that Urich, along with Feldstein, was employed by a Qatar-funded international firm, The Third Circle (which was owned by Jay Footlik), to promote Doha's image in Israel, particularly highlighting Qatar's role in mediating hostage negotiations between Israel and Hamas. It was mentioned that the company sought to influence media coverage in Israel through direct and indirect means.

In the same month, Attorney General of Israel Gali Baharav-Miara instructed the Shin Bet security agency and the Israel Police to investigate the allegations, marking the official launch of the "Qatargate" investigation.

Urich was arrested on 31 March 2025, and his arrest was extended by the magistrate court in Petah Tikva on 4 April until 7 April 2025. Urich is suspected of multiple offenses, including contact with a foreign agent, bribery, fraud, breach of trust, and money laundering.

He was released to house arrest on 7 April, which ended in May 2025. The security restrictions that were in place would have lapsed on 18 August, after the magistrate court ruled on 14 August that the police did not "produce evidence" that would meet the threshold indicating that Urich was a "public servant." The police appealed the decision on 17 August, which was accepted by Lod district court judge Amit Michles on 19 August. The restrictions against Urich will remain until 10 September. Urich was called for questioning by Lahav 433, which took place on 20 August.

The Israeli police requested in September that the magistrate court not allow Urich to work in the prime minister's office, though the request was denied. The police appealed on 12 September to the Lod District Court. The district court accepted the appeal on 18 September, preventing Urich from working in the prime minister's office, or contacting anyone else involved in Qatargate, and marks the fifth time that Michles has overturned a Qatargate-related decision by the Rishon LeZion Magistrate Court. Urich's legal team appealed to the High Court of Justice on 5 October 2025. Amit Michles of the Lod District court, on 25 October 2025, allowed Urich to work with the Likud party, though the ban on working with the prime minister's office remains in place.

The police called for Urich to be barred from working with the Prime Minister's Office and Netanyahu; Urich was questioned on 19 January "on suspicion of obstructing the investigation" into the document leak. The following Sunday, Urich was restricted by the Lod District Court from working with Netanyahu until March. Police sought to keep the contact ban and the travel ban in place in March, pending a hearing later in the month. The Rishon Lezion Magistrate Court ruled that while Urich may not work at the Prime Minister's Office (PMO), he can contact the prime minister, but is unable to discuss on the ongoing investigation with him. Urich was given access to the PMO in early May 2026.

Baharav-Miara and Amit Aisman, the head of the state attorney's office, announced in late May that their office intended to indict Urich in the classified documents case. Urich was indicted in June 2026 for "transmitting classified information with the intent to harm state security." The prosecution requested that Urich be barred from working in the PMO, that he be prohibited from working in a secure facility, and that he have no contact with other people involved in the case. The judge in the case, Ala Masarwa of the Tel Aviv District court, ruled on 25 June that Urich may work with Netanyahu.
