= 2024 Israeli secret document leak scandal =

The 2024 Israeli secret document leak scandal, more commonly known as BibiLeaks, is a political affair in Israel centered on 1 November 2024 reports that government officials close to Israeli prime minister Benjamin Netanyahu had leaked state secrets regarding the goals of the Gaza war. Shin Bet, Israel's internal security service, in cooperation with the army and police, is investigating the scandal. A number of suspects have been arrested, while the prime minister said none of his aides had been arrested. Yedioth Ahronoth reported that one of the detainees had attended confidential meetings with Netanyahu at the Defense Ministry headquarters. The American website Axios reported that the arrest of four individuals, including Eli Feldstein, spokesperson for Netanyahu, is at the center of what is considered the most significant scandal in the Israeli government since the onset of the war.

== Leaks ==
The documents were illegally taken by Ari Rosenfeld, a non-commissioned officer in the IDF who was serving in the Military Intelligence Directorate.

Rosenfeld leaked three documents, one which discussed Hamas plans for psychological warfare against Israel, while two other documents were authored by the Intelligence Directorate.

== Publication ==
An article was published by The Jewish Chronicle on 5 September 2024, claiming Hamas leader Yahya Sinwar was surrounded by a ring of about 20 hostages and planned "to smuggle himself and the remaining Hamas leaders along with Israeli hostages" into Egypt and on to Iran, via the Philadelphi Corridor. An article in the German newspaper Bild published on 6 September purported to describe a "secret" document outlining the negotiation strategy followed by Hamas with Israel.

The article in The Jewish Chronicle was withdrawn days later as a complete fabrication and caused a major scandal for the publication, with several writers resigning in protest.

The Bild report said that a document was found on a computer believed to belong to Yahya Sinwar, then head of Hamas's political bureau, outlining "guidelines for achieving a ceasefire" personally approved by Sinwar. According to the alleged document, Hamas did not aim to end the conflict quickly, but rather sought to improve the terms of the agreement, even if this led to prolonging the conflict. The document claimed that Hamas’s strategy was based on several axes, including psychological pressure on the families of the hostages with the aim of increasing popular pressure on the Israeli government, draining Israel’s political and military resources, and intensifying international pressure on the Israeli side. The Israel Defense Forces (IDF) reported on 8 September that the document was in fact an old document found five months prior and that it was not written by Sinwar nor taken from anywhere close to Sinwar but "written as a recommendation by middle ranks in Hamas". According to several Israeli media outlets, the content of the document was inaccurately represented both in the Bild article and in Netanyahu’s subsequent references to it. Specifically, a purported quote from the document demonstrating that Hamas was not interested in a hostage deal was not present in the document at all – in fact, the document made plain that Hamas was very much interested in a deal.

Critics alleged both articles were aimed at giving Netanyahu political cover, as Gaza ceasefire talks were grinding to a halt over Netanyahu's insistence that Israel needed to retain a military force in the Philadelphi Corridor. At the time the articles were published, Netanyahu faced intense criticism from the hostages' families and the Israeli public, who blamed him for the failure to reach a deal.

== Investigations ==
The IDF began an investigation of the leak in September 2024, with the Information Security Department investigating the case. In addition, IDF chief of staff Herzi Halevi requested that the Shin Bet begin its own investigation. Rosenfeld was identified first, with three other suspects, as well as Feldstein, identified soon after.

Jonatan Urich, who served as Netanyahu's advisor, was advised in July 2025 that the State Attorney’s Office was considering criminal charges over his alleged transfer of classified information "with intent to harm national security", in addition to "possessing classified information" and "destroying evidence."

Herzi Halevi, who served as the IDF chief of staff at the time of the leak, testified on 14 January 2026.

== Reactions ==
Opposition leaders Yair Lapid and Benny Gantz criticised Netanyahu, referring to the scandal as a "national crime", with Lapid stating that the real danger may come from within the prime minister's office itself. He added that the scandal shakes the foundations of the trust the Israeli people have placed in their leadership. At a news conference, Lapid said that if Netanyahu knew about the leaks, "he is complicit in one of the most serious security offences" and that if he did not know, he was not fit for office. Gantz, who was a member of Netanyahu's war cabinet, said at the same event that if sensitive security information was used for a "political survival campaign”, it would not only be a criminal offence, but "a crime against the nation".

The Hostages and Missing Families Forum said in a statement: "The attack against the hostages and their families has an address, a sender, and motives that constitute a real threat to national security and to the war objectives. The foundation of evidence, which has allegedly accumulated in this serious case currently being investigated by the Shin Bet, indicates that the prime minister’s inner circle acted in a way that harms national security with the aim of thwarting the return of the hostages. ... The suspicions indicate that people associated with the prime minister acted to carry out one of the greatest public deceptions in the state’s history. A government that abandoned citizens who became victims of cruel kidnappings is effectively working to defame them and harm public opinion regarding the duty to return them – as if they were the nation’s enemy.

An article in the pro-Netanyahu Israel Hayom called the scandal "one of the gravest affairs Israel has ever known. ... The damage it caused extends beyond the realm of national security and gives rise to suspicion that the prime minister's bureau acted to scuttle a hostage deal, contrary to the war’s objectives."

Netanyahu issued a statement in July 2025 criticizing the decision by Attorney General of Israel Gali Baharav-Miara to bring charges against Urich.

On 5 February 2026, former IDF chief Gadi Eisenkot said that Netanyahu jeopardized one of the most important source of Israel on captives in Gaza by allowing leak of the classified document by his aides.

== Analysis ==
With growing accusations and ongoing leaks, Netanyahu’s political career could be at risk. Nonetheless, Haaretz warned that the opposition should temper its expectations.

== See also ==
- Qatari connection affair, a related scandal
- Israeli retaliation leak
- January 2025 Gaza war ceasefire
- Trial of Benjamin Netanyahu
- International Criminal Court arrest warrants for Israeli leaders
- Gaza genocide
