= Nadav Argaman =

Shin Bet chief

Nadav Argaman נָדָב אַרְגָּמָן
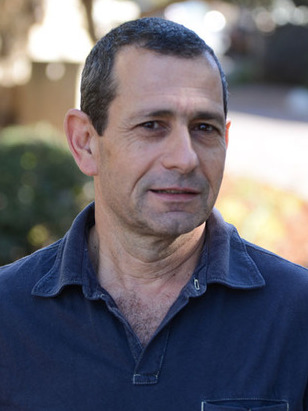
- Born: 11 August 1960 (age 65); Ramat HaSharon, Israel
- Occupation: Intelligence officer
- Espionage activity
- Allegiance: Israel
- Service branch: Shabak
- Service years: 1983–2021
- Rank: Director

Nadav Argaman (Hebrew: נָדָב אַרְגָּמָן; born 11 August 1960) is a former director of Shin Bet from 8 May 2016 to 13 October 2021. He previously served as deputy head of Shin Bet, Operations Division chief, and the Shin Bet representative in the United States. He was appointed by Prime Minister Benjamin Netanyahu on 11 February 2016 and assumed office in May 2016.

== Biography ==
Argaman was born to Israeli Jewish parents Amiram and Tikva in Ramat HaSharon, and was raised, from the age of two, in kibbutz Hamadia. He joined the Army in 1978 and volunteered to serve in the IDF's Special Forces unit Sayeret Matkal, and later on moved to another special unit.

In 1983, he joined the Shin Bet and served in various command and staff posts. Between 2003 and 2007 he served as head of the Shin Bet Operations Division and between 2007 and 2011 served as head of the Shin Bet security of North America. Then between 2011 and 2014 he served as deputy head of Shin Bet. Among other things, in November 2012 at the beginning of Operation Pillar of Defense he commanded the operation that assassinated the Hamas military wing commander, Ahmed Jabari.

In September 2014, he was loaned to the Israel Atomic Energy Commission. In September 2015, he returned to the Shin Bet and was appointed deputy head of the organization. In February 2016, Prime Minister Benjamin Netanyahu decided to appoint him to be the next Shin Bet chief, and on 8 May 2016 he assumed office, replacing his predecessor Yoram Cohen.

Immediately upon assuming position as chief, he presented a five-point work plan, including increasing the Shin Bet's capabilities in the areas of technology and cyber. In mid 2017, Argaman stated that the Shin Bet's cyber activity contributed to identifying and locating over 2,000 potential terrorists since 2016. He also created a good working relationship and detailed agreement between the Shin Bet and the IDF's intelligence branch in order to avoid wasting resources and reduce operational capabilities as a result of arguments over responsibilities and budgets. He also strengthened the relationships with foreign intelligence agencies. In 2019, it was reported that approximately one third of the organization's manpower are technological people.

During the riots on the Temple Mount in 2017, Argaman supported the decision to remove the metal detectors that were placed in the entrances to the Temple Mount. After the terrorist attack in the Israeli Embassy in Jordan, Argaman was sent to Jordan to discuss the release of the security guard who was assaulted.

Argaman earned a BA and MA in political science from Haifa University, and an additional master's degree in security and strategy from the National Security Studies Center at the Haifa University. Argaman is also a graduate of the Israeli National Security College.

Argaman was succeeded by Ronen Bar on 13 October 2021.

== Personal life ==
Argaman was married to Ruth, the mother of his three children, and they are divorced. In 2020, he remarried to Anat, whom he met during their joint work in the Shin Bet. They live in Rosh HaAyin.

Argaman holds a BA and MA in Political Science from the University of Haifa. He also holds an additional MA in Security and Strategy from the University of Haifa.
