= Nir Dvori =

Israeli military correspondent

- ניר דבורי
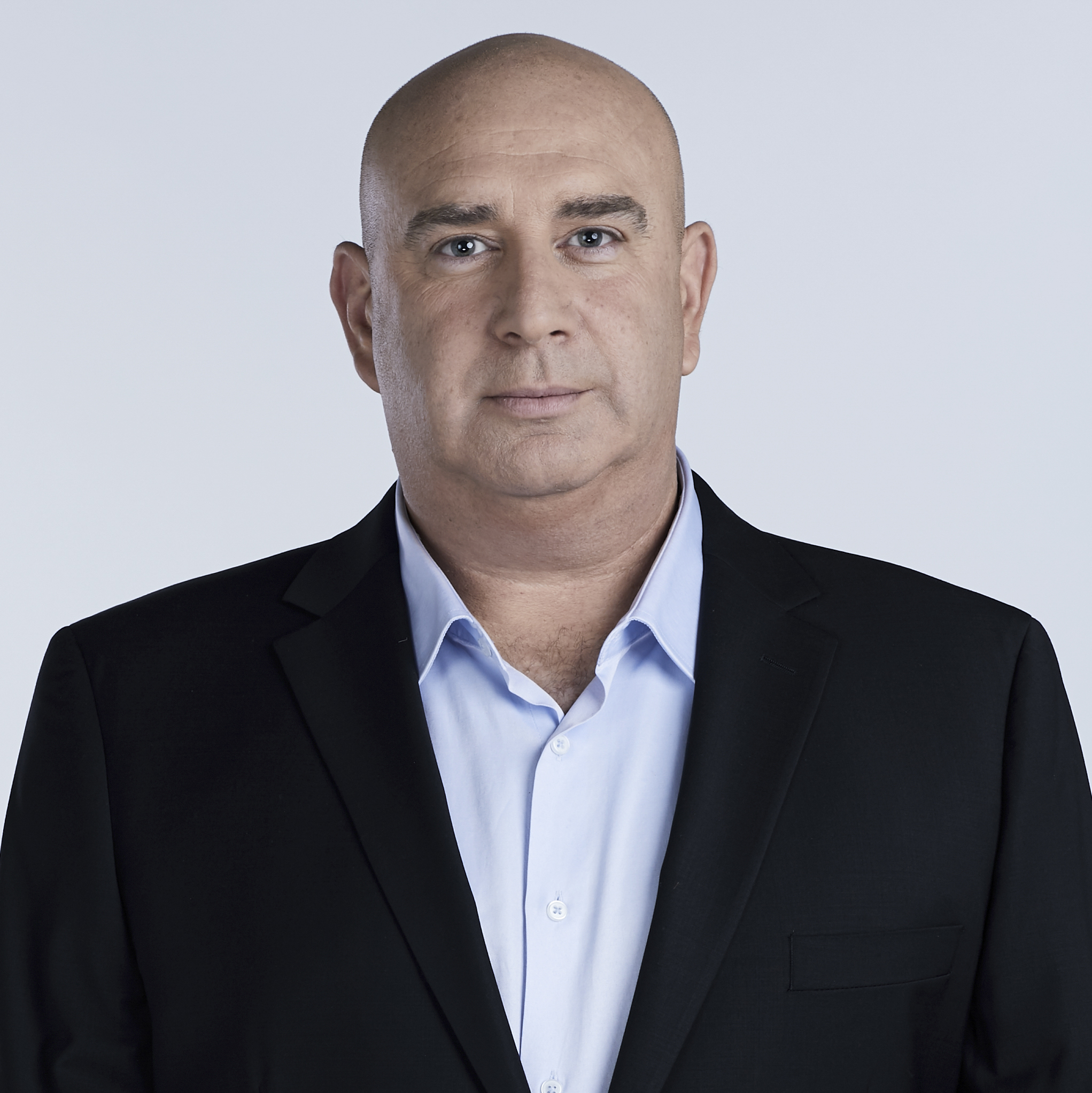
- Born: 30 January 1972 (age 54); Eilon, Israel
- Occupations: War correspondent, Journalist
- Years active: 2002-present
- Television: Hevrat HaHadashot Channel 12

Nir Davori (Hebrew: ניר דבורי; born 30 January 1972) is an Israeli war correspondent, and head of the military and security affairs desk at Channel 12's Hevrat HaHadashot.

== Biography ==
Dvori was born on 30 January 1972 in Eilon, a kibbutz in the Northern District of Israel, he served briefly in Unit 669 before leaving training. Dvori later studied journalism at the Koteret school in Tel Aviv. In 2002, he joined Channel 2 as a news researcher, and in 2005 became military correspondent for the channel.

During 2014 Gaza War, a Globes survey ranked him as the most successful reporter.

In August 2023, Dvori was appointed head of the military and security affairs desk at Channel 12's Hevrat HaHadashot.

In April 2025, Dvori testified along with two other journalists in the Qatari connection affair.

== Personal life ==
Dvori is married to Sagit, has three children, and lives in Ramat Gan.
