= Shlomo Filber =

Israeli lawyer and pollster

- שלמה פילבר
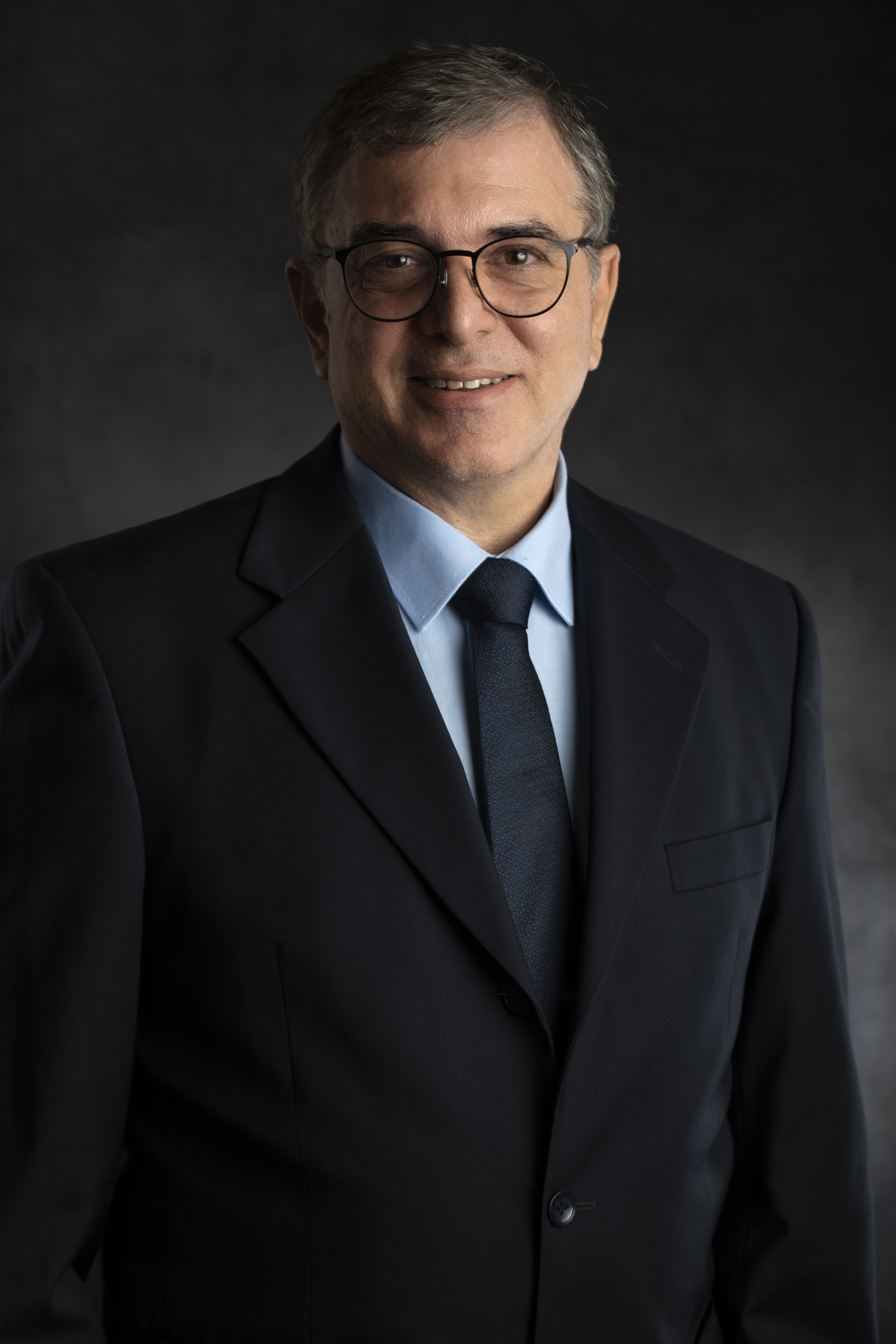
- Filber in November 2022

Director-General of the Ministry of Communications
- In office 2015–2018
- Preceded by: Avi Berger
- Succeeded by: Nati Cohen

Director-general of Yesha Council
- In office 1999–2001

Deputy chairman of Yesha Council
- In office 1996–1998

Personal details
- Born: May 21, 1963 (age 63) Jerusalem
- Party: Likud
- Children: 7
- Education: Bar-Ilan University (BA); Ono Academic College (MBA)
- Profession: Pollster, General manager

Shlomo Filber (Hebrew: שלמה פילבר; born 31 May 1963) is an Israeli lawyer who formerly served as the director-general of the Ministry of Communications from 2015 to 2018. He also founded and managed the polling firm Direct Polls from 2019 to 2025. Filber has also been a witness in the ongoing Netanyahu corruption trial.

== Biography ==
=== Early life ===
Shlomo Filber was born in Jerusalem on 31 May 1963 to rabbi Yaakov Halevi Filber and Tzvia Filber (née Waserzog). He graduated from the Shvut Israel Yeshiva in Efrat and from Mercaz HaRav. In June 1982, Filber served in the 35th Paratroopers Brigade and participated in the 1982 Lebanon war. In 1997, Filber graduated from Bar-Ilan University with a bachelor's in law, then in 2006 graduated from Ono Academic College with a Master of Business Administration (MBA).

In the 1980s, he served as secretary of Psagot. He then worked at the Mateh Binyamin Regional Council as deputy treasurer, director of the construction and development division, and CEO of the Mateh Binyamin Housing Company.

In December 1995, he published a conspiracy theory about Rabin's assassination in the magazine "Nokuta" under the title "Idle Bullets." According to this theory, the Shin Bet through Avishai Raviv instigated Yigal Amir to commit the murder, and was supposed to equip him without his knowledge with a blank. According to Filber, the article was written by Uri Elitzur, who asked Filber to sign the article on his behalf.

From 1996 to 1998, Filber served as the deputy chairman of the Yesha Council, then served as director-general from 1999 to 2001. During his tenure as director-general, Filber helped organized allies to support the settler community. He also supported the policy of blocking roads for Palestinians following instances of Palestinian political violence.

=== Entry into national politics ===
From 2001 to 2003, Filber served as chief of staff to Benjamin Netanyahu while Ariel Sharon was prime minister. Filber accompanied Netanyahu in his lectures around the world and helped preparations for Netanyahu's political comeback.

From 2003 to 2009, Filber served in Israel Railways as the board secretary and assets and business development manager.

During the 2015 Israeli legislative election, Filber helped with campaign management for Likud, which was led by Netanyahu. He was the first in Israel to operate a Big Data system for mapping voters using digital means, which involved a system of SMS messages and voice calls segmented into audiences.

A petition was filed to the Central Elections Committee to end distribution for the newspaper Israel Hayom claiming it to be "election propaganda" for Likud and Netanuahu. In response, Filber signed an affidavit as part of the reply from Likud, which claimed that Netanyahu has no control or organizational connection with "Israel Hayom".

=== Director General of the Ministry of Communications ===
After the formation of the 34th government, Netanyahu appointed Filber to be director-general of the Ministry of Communications. During his tenure, Filber took part in negotiations with Bezeq regarding its monopolistic status in the landline market. He negotiated a settlement between Bezeq and its competitors, where competitors would pay a higher price for using landlines, and Mezek would establish fiber optic service for most of the country by the end of 2019. Filber believed that too much economic competition in the cellular market would hinder private innovation, and that four companies in the market is sufficient.

In 2016, Filber made a presentation to the Knesset where he believed that Israel is lagging in communications infrastructure and in need of additional investment. He prepared an outline plan for improvement, but was met with opposition by some, including from the State Comptroller, and the plan was dropped.

=== Filber Committee ===
In September 2015, Filber was appointed by Prime Minister Benjamin Netanyahu to head an inter-ministerial committee, whose goal was to formulate recommendations for new and uniform regulation of the broadcasting and content market. In light of the technological changes that occurred in the previous decade, and the ability to broadcast content over the Internet, the committee's goal was to encourage "the entry of new players, and to encourage competition in the field of content and news".

After about a year, a detailed report was submitted which recommended easing regulations and opening up the market to competition, specifically to reduce restrictions on advertising minutes and sponsorships, allow for the integration of marketing content, and gradually reduce the investment obligation in 'high-end' and original productions. In March 2017, acting Minister of Communications Tzachi Hanegbi adopted these recommendations and instructed the preparation of legislative amendments for implementation. The directive led to Amendment 66 to the Communications Law, which allowed channels like Channel 14 to become general commercial channels, alongside significant regulatory relief on content obligations and investment in local productions for new players in the market.

=== Netanyahu corruption trial ===
In July 2017, Filber was suspected of advancing the interests of Bezeq in his post in the Ministry of Communications and was placed on house arrest as part of investigations into the Bezeq-Elovitch affair. He later stopped his work at the ministry, and was dismissed entirely by April 2018. According to the Israel Securities Authority, Filber "acted systematically, deliberately and continuously, while concealing the work from the professional and legal elements of his office, to transfer to Bezeq classified documents as well as internal position papers, correspondence and documents from inter-ministerial discussions, including those that had not yet been discussed in the authorized forums both in the Ministry of Communications and in the inter-ministerial forums."

On 18 February 2018, Filber was arrested by the police as sent to five days of detention as part of the investigation. Two days later, Filber signed an agreement to become a state witness, but continued to claim that he is innocent. In the agreement, Filber agreed to refrain from public service positions and to suspend his law license for five years.

On 23 March 2022, Filber began his testimony in the Netanyahu corruption trial. His testimony ended three months later on 29 June.

=== Direct Polls ===
In early 2018, Filber founded strategy and research company "Direct Polls" that deals with SMS-based surveys. Filber has served as co-owner and chief strategist for the company. The company has conducted about 1,100 surveys and studies in the first two years of its founding.

In 2019, Direct Polls conducted models for leadership elections in Likud and Labor. The company also conducted surveys relating to Netanyahu's corruption trial commissioned by Likud officials.

During preparations for the 2022 Israeli legislative election, Direct Polls conducted surveys for Channel 14, and Likud paid more than 300,000 shekels for surveys. The polls correctly predicted a victory for the pro-Netanyahu bloc in the election.

During the 2024 Israeli municipal elections, Direct Polls conducted an exit poll, but was criticized for producing inaccurate predictions in some instances.

In May 2024, Direct Polls won a tender from the Prime Minister's Office. There have also been claims that the company provided predictions that suit the needs of Netanyahu.

In June 2025, Filber announced that he will be leaving Direct Polls, and will continue to conduct surveys for Channel 14 as a strategic consultant independently.

== Personal life ==
Filber is married to Ilanit and lives in Petah Tikva. He has five children from his first marriage and two children from his second marriage. His cousin Yair Maayan is the mayor of Arad.
