= Eli Feldstein =

Benjamin Netanyahu's spokesman for military affairs

- אלי פלדשטיין
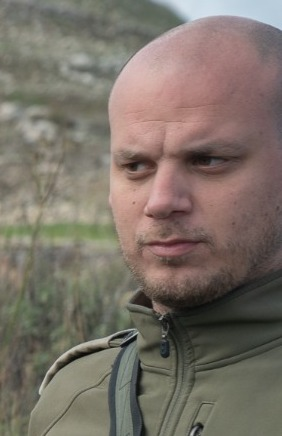
- Born: Eli Feldstein; 1992 (age 33–34); Petah Tikva, Israel
- Education: Yeshiva Or Israel
- Occupation: Spokesperson
- Years active: 2014–present

Eliezer "Eli" Feldstein (Hebrew: אלי פלדשטיין; born about 1992) is Benjamin Netanyahu's spokesman for military affairs. He was interrogated and arrested in November 2024 on suspicion of security offenses during the Gaza war, and in March 2025 he was arrested on suspicion of involvement in the Qatari connection affair.

== Biography ==
Feldstein is a graduate of Yeshiva Or Israel in Petach Tikva, a Haredi-Litvaks yeshiva. In June 2014, he enlisted in the Israel Defense Forces (IDF) and served as the spokesperson of the Personnel Directorate, where he was responsible for liaison with Haredi media. In July 2016, he completed an officers course and was appointed chief of staff to the head of the Planning Division in the Planning Directorate. In June 2017, he was appointed operations officer for the IDF Spokesman's Office.

In July 2019, he was appointed spokesman for the Judea and Samaria Division, being relieved from regular service with the rank of captain. In December 2022, he was appointed spokesman for the Minister of National Security, Itamar Ben-Gvir, until he resigned in April 2023.

In October 2023, on the fourth day of the Israel–Hamas war, he was appointed the spokesman for military affairs for the prime minister of Israel, Benjamin Netanyahu, entrusted with the connection between military correspondents and the Bureau of Netanyahu. He failed a security investigation conducted by the Shin Bet and was not officially employed by Netanyahu's office. Feldstein recounted in an interview with Kan in December 2025 that he did not receive the clearance as he admitted to drug use.

== Legal issues ==
He was met by someone who appeared to be a senior figure from Netanyahu's office at HaKirya, days before his arrest, who indicated that he could "suppress the whole matter". This person was identified by Feldstein in a December 2025 interview with Kan as Tzachi Braverman, Netanyahu's chief of staff.

Feldstein was arrested on 27 October 2024 and charged with "transferring classified information with the intent to harm the state", "illicit possession of classified information" and "obstruction of justice." Another suspect (later identified as Ari Rosenfeld), has said that he passed the information on to Feldstein to inform the prime minister.

Feldstein (who received the documents in April), leaked the documents in August, following the deaths of several hostages, in an effort to blame Hamas for a breakdown in hostage negotiations at the time. According to the IDF, it harmed the "war aim of freeing the hostages, as well as the operations of the IDF and the Shin Bet security service in Gaza."

Feldstein's identity was revealed on 3 November 2024 after a gag order was lifted by the Rishon LeZion district court. On 13 November 2024, the court extended Feldstein's detention until 17 November 2024, allowing him to meet with a lawyer. Feldstein was indicted on 21 November on charges of transferring and holding classified information, as well as "obstruction of justice." Alex Stein of the High Court of Justice ruled on 9 December 2024 that Feldstein could be released to house arrest.

In March 2025, an Israeli businessman, Gil Birger, moved money from Jay Footlik to Feldstein, as Feldstein's salary in the Office of the Prime Minister, bypassing the Israeli income tax law.

He was arrested in March 2025 for suspected involvement in the Qatari connection affair. Netanyahu has described Feldstein and his other aide Jonatan Urich as "being held hostage" following their arrests. The details were under a court-imposed gag order, but the group in charge of Urich's defense requested that the order be lifted, which was granted on 1 April.

Feldstein was released to house arrest on 4 April 2025. He is suspected of multiple offenses. Feldstein was interrogated at the Lahav 433 offices in August 2025.

His attorney, Oded Savoray, argued in court on 23 November that Feldstein was not criminally responsible as he was acting on Urich's orders.
