= Ukrainian Academy of Sciences (non-governmental organization) =

Public organisation of Ukraine

Ukrainian Academy of Sciences (UAN; Ukrainian: Українська академія наук, romanized: Ukrajinsʹka akademija nauk) is a public organization that positions itself as an association of scientists and production workers of Ukraine. Founded in 1991. It is the legal successor of the Ukrainian Academy of Sciences of National Progress.

According to the Academician of the National Academy of Sciences of Ukraine, the President of the Ukrainian Astronomical Association Yaroslav Yatskiv, the public organization "UAN" has no known scientific achievements. According to an experiment conducted by journalist Irina Kovalenko in February 2017, one can get a certificate of a "member of the Ukrainian Academy of Sciences" by paying "for a vacancy" an amount equivalent to $300.

UAN includes structures (for example, military-cossack department) that are called "funny" in the media.
