= Jay Footlik =

American actor and politician (born 1965)

- Born: October 19, 1965 (age 61); Skokie, Illinois
- Education: Niles North High School; UCLA

Jay Kerry Footlik (October 19, 1965) is an American actor and lobbyist for Qatar and Morocco.

He served as Special Assistant to United States President Bill Clinton and as a senior Middle East advisor to John Kerry.

== Early life and education ==
Footlik was born in 1965 in Skokie, Illinois. As a child his family suffered from financial struggles, still sending him to Hebrew school at Niles Township Jewish Congregation. He graduated from Niles North High School.

He earned a B.A. in political science from UCLA, specializing in US foreign policy and the Middle East (1988). He also has a Juris Doctor from Loyola Law School of Los Angeles (1994) and is a member of the Maryland State Bar Association.

== Career ==
Footlik serves on the board of trustees of the American Council of Young Political Leaders (ACYPL) and is a founding board member of SAFE (Securing America's Future Energy), an organization dedicated to reducing America's dependency on oil.

=== On theatre and on screen ===
At age 12 Footlik had his first professional theatrical appearance in "Working" by Studs Terkel, adapted and directed by Stephen Schwartz at Goodman Theatre in Chicago. He later performed in numerous Chicago productions at Marriott's Lincolnshire Theatre and others. He has appeared on movies such as: Teen Wolf (1985), Iron Eagle (1986) and Redemption Day (2021); and on television in Chicago Story (1982), The Judge (1986) and Dig (2015).

=== In politics ===
He held a senior position on Bill Clinton’s successful campaign for president in 1992 and was later a Special Assistant to Clinton while he served as the president of the United States. He was also special liaison to the American Jewish community in Clinton's administration.

He was later Senior Middle East Advisor for John Kerry’s presidential campaign in 2004, and Director of Constituency Outreach for Joe Lieberman's presidential campaign in 2008.

Footlik was a candidate for United States Congress in Illinois's 10th congressional district, losing to Dan Seals in the primary in 2008.

== Qatari connection affair ==
In 2024, he consulted with Israeli families of hostages held by Hamas, meeting them in Washington, D.C. and organizing for them to meet with Qatari officials.

In 2025, he was named as one of the main people involved in the Qatari connection affair, allegedly transferring money from Qatar to Israeli prime Minister Benjamin Netanyahu's spokesperson Eli Feldstein via businessman Gil Birger. A United States-based interview which had been planned with Footlik was cancelled in July 2025. Previous interviews had been delayed for personal reasons, including a death in Footlik's family. A planned inquiry by the United States Department of Justice, which was expected to take place in coordination with the Israeli police, was dropped in July 2025, with no explanation given. An arrest warrant for Footlik was issued by Israeli police in late August 2025.

== Personal life ==
Footlik has three daughters and lives in suburban Washington, DC.

He is a member of the Democratic Party.
