= Gali Baharav-Miara =

Israeli lawyer and State Attorney General

- גלי בהרב-מיארה
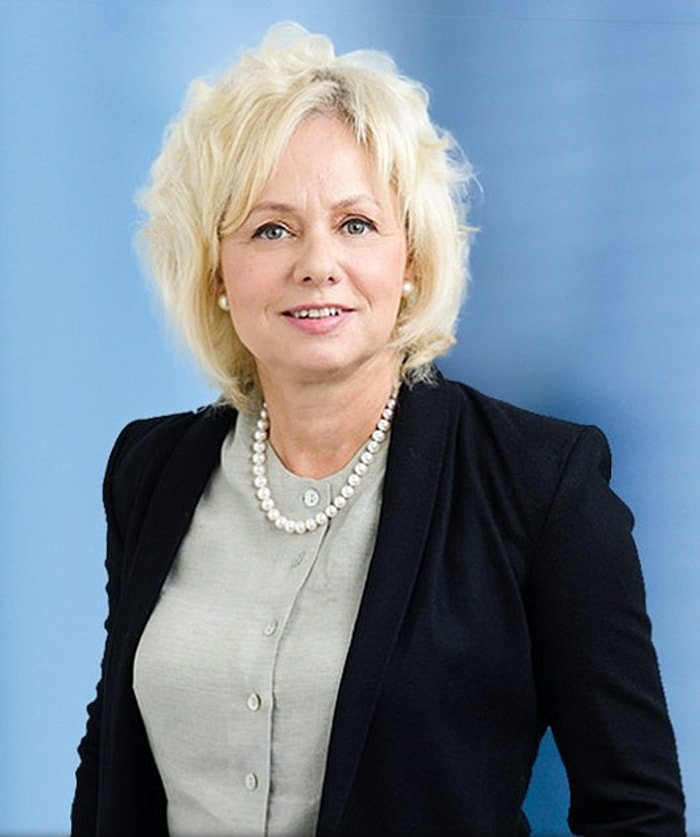

15th Attorney General of Israel
- Incumbent
- Assumed office 7 February 2022
- Prime Minister: Naftali Bennett; Yair Lapid; Benjamin Netanyahu
- Preceded by: Avichai Mandelblit

Tel Aviv District Attorney for Civil Affairs
- In office 2007–2015

Personal details
- Born: 18 September 1959 (age 66) Israel
- Spouse: Tzion Miara
- Children: 3
- Education: Tel Aviv University

Gali Baharav-Miara (Hebrew: גלי בהרב-מיארה; born 18 September 1959) is an Israeli lawyer who serves as the current Attorney General of Israel. Prior to her legal career she served in Unit 8200. In her legal career, she served as the Tel Aviv District Attorney for Civil Affairs, and as a consultant to the law firm Tadmor, Levy, & Co. She is the first female Attorney General of Israel.

== Biography ==
She was born to Shulamit Baharav (née Davidovich), a painter, and to Emanuel Baharav, who served in the Palmach and fought in the War of Independence. She did her military service in Unit 8200 and in the Research Department of the IDF Military Intelligence Directorate. She holds both a bachelor's degree (1984, with honors) and a master's degree (1990) in law from Tel Aviv University, where she served as a teaching assistant and adjunct professor.

In 1985, she joined the Tel Aviv District Attorney's Office, where she served for about thirty years in a variety of positions, mainly in the fields of civil and administrative law. In 2002, she was appointed director of the administrative department of the District Attorney's Office, and between 2007 and 2015 she served as Tel Aviv District Attorney for Civil Affairs. In tort cases filed by Palestinians living in the West Bank against the State of Israel, she has led a policy of opposition to the lawsuits. In 2014, she was among the candidates for the position of Director General of the Ministry of Justice, but eventually was not chosen for the position.

She was chosen as one of the 50 most influential women by Globes for 2022 and 2023.

== After retiring from the State Attorney's Office ==
After retiring from the State Attorney's Office, she joined the law firm Tadmor & Co. as a consultant.

Since 2015, she has been a member of the Civil Service Commission's search committee, giving her opinion to the government on senior appointments whose appointments require government approval. She also served as a member of the Advisory Committee for the Administrative Courts Law and the Advisory Committee on Civil Procedure, chaired the Committee for the Examination of Appointments in Municipal Corporations in the Ministry of the Interior, chaired the Public Committee for the Examination of Private Investigations, and a member of the Administrative Courts Council.

In 2018, at the request of the State Attorney's Office, she wrote an opinion defending Benny Gantz and Amir Eshel from a tort lawsuit filed in a Dutch court by a Palestinian whose family members were killed in the 2014 Gaza War. Her opinion was accepted and the claim was dismissed. In May 2019, along with former senior members of the State Attorney's Office and the office of the Attorney General of Israel, she signed a statement against initiatives to grant the Knesset an override of the Supreme Court and the extension of the Immunity Law.

== Attorney General of Israel ==
In November 2021, Baharav-Miara was named by Justice Minister Gideon Saar as one of the three candidates for the position of Attorney General, and was considered his preferred candidate. Her candidacy was also supported by Prime Minister Naftali Bennett. On 7 February 2022, the government unanimously approved her appointment. Baharav-Miara is the first woman to serve in that position.

Justice minister Yariv Levin initiated the process of firing her in March 2025. The cabinet unanimously voted on 23 March to dismiss Baharav-Miara from office in a vote of no confidence. The cabinet approved a "new method" in June 2025, allowing for Baharav-Miara's dismissal by a committee of cabinet members which included chair Amichai Chikli, Bezalel Smotrich, Itamar Ben-Gvir, Gila Gamliel and Michael Malchieli, rather than a committee of "legal professionals and public figures." Noam Sohlberg of the High Court of Justice called for a return to the process of dismissal described by the Shamgar Commission, which was implemented in 2000 and called for a professional committee. The government was previously unable to find members who were willing to sit on the committee.

The government fired Baharav-Miara on 4 August 2025. The High Court of Justice froze her firing the same day. Communications Minister Shlomo Karhi issued a letter in which he told ministry workers to "disregard orders" issued by the Attorney General, while the State Attorney called her dismissal "highly irregular." The High Court will hear her case on 3 September, with an expanded panel of nine judges, rather than six, which will include the most senior judges. The court issued an injunction on 10 August 2025, which "suspended" the order to fire Baharav-Miara. The judges unanimously recommended on 1 September that the government should cancel its decision to fire Baharav-Miara. On 14 December the High Court unanimously annulled the firing, asserting that the government had failed to provide legal justification for its decision to change the way an AG is fired, and determining that the new system it designed was fundamentally flawed.

== Personal life ==
Baharav-Miara was married to Tzion Miara, who served in senior positions in the security services. In 2002 he was diagnosed with ALS and lived with the disease for many years, before dying in June 2025. The couple has three sons and lived in Tel Aviv.
