= 2004 attempt to revive the Sanhedrin =

Beginning in October 2004, an attempt was made to re-establish a revived Sanhedrin, a national rabbinical court of Jewish law in Israel. The organization heading this attempt referred to itself as the nascent Sanhedrin or developing Sanhedrin, and regarded itself as a provisional body awaiting integration into the Israeli government as both a supreme court and an upper house of the Knesset. The Israeli secular press regards it as an illegitimate fundamentalist organization of rabbis. The organization, which was composed of over 70 rabbis (similar to the composition of the original Sanhedrin), claimed to enjoy recognition and support from the entire religious Jewish community in Israel. However, it was mostly ignored by the Haredi community, and stirred debate in both religious and secularist circles. There has not been a "full meeting" of the Sanhedrin since 2005 and its leader resigned in 2008. Haredi Zionist rabbis involved in the Sanhedrin revival attempt included Yisrael Ariel and Yoel Schwartz.

== Precedents ==
The 12th century scholar, Maimonides, discussed the seeming incompatibility of the essential requirement of Jewish Law for a Sanhedrin, and the inability to form one due to the loss of semikhah. In his magnum opus, the Mishneh Torah, he proposed a procedure to re-establish a Sanhedrin. This later became the subject of legal rulings by Rabbi Jacob Berab, Rabbi Yosef Karo and others.

There have been several attempts to implement Maimonides' recommendations. The current attempt is the sixth in recent history. It is modeled after the attempt by Rabbi Jacob Berab in 1538, and follows attempts by Rabbi Yisroel of Shklov in 1830, Rabbi Aharon Mendel haCohen in 1901, Rabbi Zvi Kovsker in 1940 and Rabbi Yehuda Leib Maimon in 1949.

== The election process and selection of Rabbi Halberstam ==
Maimonides and other medieval commentators suggested that, although the line of semikhah (Biblical ordination) from Moses had been broken in 425 CE, if the sages in the land of Israel agree upon a single candidate being worthy of semikhah, that individual would have semikhah, and could then grant it to others, thus enabling the re-establishment of the Sanhedrin.

This attempt was intended to improve upon Rabbi Jacob Berab's attempt by contacting seven hundred rabbis across Israel, as opposed to Jacob Berab's election by twenty-five rabbis of Safed. According to the new Sanhedrin's website, the process of election was explained by Rabbi Dov Levanoni, a member of the new Sanhedrin. He said the most recent attempt to renew the institution of semikhah in 2004 was made through a consensus of hundreds of the most influential and scholarly rabbis living in Israel. While Rabbi Jacob Berab and Rabbi Joseph Karo laid an excellent halachic (Jewish law) foundation for understanding this teaching of Maimonides, the current attempt to re-establish the Jewish Sanhedrin has tried to learn from previous attempts and avoid some of the pitfalls. For example, to avoid claims that not all the rabbis of Israel were aware of the latest attempt to set up the Sanhedrin, an initial enormous expenditure was spent on a publicity campaign of the upcoming semikhah process, 50,000 copies of a detailed flier were distributed among 4,500 Jewish centers in Israel, outlining that a vote of a first samuch was going to be held, along with contact information of the Va'ad ha-Mechonen la-Sanhedrin. Not long afterwards, seven hundred leading rabbis were contacted either in person or by written letter. Levanoni explained that Rabbi Moshe Halberstam, a senior rabbi on Jerusalem's Edah HaChareidis, became the first samuch after receiving approval by Israel's leading rabbis – those followed by most of Israel's religious Jews – and there were no objections from the hundreds of rabbis consulted via written letters.

The website also claims that leading sages have supported the semikhah directly or indirectly or abstained, and specifically mentions these names, though with no proof: Rabbi Yosef Shalom Eliashiv, Rabbi Ovadia Yosef, Rabbi Zalman Nechemia Goldberg and many others gave their blessing but did not join the Sanhedrin. The son of Rabbi Mordecai Eliyahu is one of the rabbis ordained. Former Ashkenazi Chief Rabbi and Rosh Yeshiva of Merkaz HaRav Kook Rabbi Avraham Shapira chose to abstain on the issue but also refused to discourage it.

Halberstam (April 1, 1932 – April 26, 2006), who was selected to receive Semikhah by consensus, was a relatively well known figure and widely respected. Halberstam was the son of Grand Rabbi Yaakov Halberstam of Tshokava (a scion of the Sanz dynasty) and of the daughter of Rabbi Sholom of Shotz of London. He was the rosh yeshiva of the Tshokava Yeshiva in Jerusalem and one of the most prominent members of the Edah Charedis Rabbinical court of Jerusalem. He was known as a tremendous Torah scholar and a decisor of halachic law. He wrote approbations to many works of Torah literature. Halberstam served at the President of Hatzolah Israel. He was also the Rabbi of the Shaarei Tzedek Hospital in Jerusalem. He was known for his tolerance towards other streams of thought in Orthodox Judaism. Despite his own Hareidi anti-Zionist background, he also maintained contacts with Modern Orthodox, religious Zionist leaders.

The website does not claim that these figures supported the creation of a Sanhedrin, only that they supported the reinstitution of classical Semikhah. Rabbi Dov Shtein, the secretary for the Sanhedrin project, claimed that Halberstam understood where his actions would lead. Shtein said "Without Rabbi Halberstam's efforts toward renewing semikhah, it would not have happened the way it did. ... By agreeing to be the first to be ordained, he took a serious risk of being rejected and condemned by his community for taking part in such a project, which set the ball rolling for the foundation of a Jewish legal body that seeks to eventually supersede the Badatz. But despite the serious pressures put on him following his agreement and granting of semikhah to others, he never went back on it or even tempered his agreement with the act of renewing semikhah."

== The formation of a placeholder Sanhedrin ==
The Sanhedrin website explains: "To avoid disagreements over who was worthy to sit on the Sanhedrin, a Beis din of 71 was immediately formed. It was formed with the best scholars available, with the public announcement every one of them has agreed to step aside the moment a more deserving candidate should step forward. Lastly, the Nasi has indicated that the Beis din would wait until the best scholars of Eretz Yisroel were represented on the Beis din before beginning to fully function halachically as the Sanhedrin of old." Rabbi Adin Steinsaltz (the Nasi of this Sanhedrin) said, "I'd be happy if in another few years these chairs are filled by scholars who are greater than us [sic] and we can say: `I kept the chairs warm for you.'"

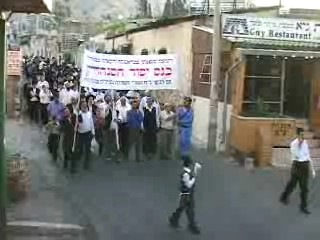
Inauguration of the Sanhedrin in 2004

In October 2004 (Tishrei 5765), a group of rabbis representing varied Orthodox communities in Israel undertook a ceremony in Tiberias, where the original Sanhedrin was disbanded. About one hundred of them at the time having proper Semikhah. This was one year after the re-establishment of Semikhah. A Beth Din of 71 was formed. They claimed to re-establish this body according to the proposal of Maimonides and the Jewish legal rulings of Rabbi Yosef Karo. The controversial attempt has been subject to debate within different Jewish communities.

Rabbi Tzvi Eidan, the author of Asot Mishpat (on the laws of reestablishing the Sanhedrin) was appointed as first interim Nasi. Rabbi Adin Steinzaltz, a noted Talmudic scholar and Jewish philosopher, was elected Nasi. The Sanhedrin's spokesmen said that due to concerns that external pressure would be brought to bear upon individuals not to take part in the establishment of a Sanhedrin, the names of most participants would not be made public.

Members included:

- Adin Steinsaltz
- Nachman Kahane
- Yoel Schwartz
- Yisrael Ariel
- Yosef Dayan

== The acceptance of office of Nasi by Rabbi Steinsaltz ==
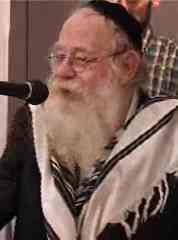
Rabbi Adin Steinsaltz

The newspaper Haaretz reported that in his speech accepting the position of Nasi, Rabbi Adin Steinsaltz said that the task of building the Sanhedrin will take some time. He spoke about gradually building up the ancient institution, which would take several generations.

In order to move forward and no longer be defined as "an aborted fetus", to become serious so we can say, "a child was born to us", we need a lot of time. The mere mention of the name Sanhedrin is not a given. It is no longer a matter of a religious council ... It's something that has historical meaning. A basic change, not of one small system, but of fundamental systems. It's no wonder that these things frighten people. There are people who are concerned about what is emerging here. And where is it headed? After we have made it through this year with no catastrophes occurring, even though there were some foolish comments and chuckling, we will intensify and strengthen our activities. We will do things with an eye toward future generations, not with a stopwatch and an annual calendar. The Jewish calendar is a calendar of thousands of years. A lot of patience and a lot of work are needed. I'd be happy if in another few years these chairs are filled by scholars who are greater than us and we can say: "I kept the chairs warm for you."

Steinsaltz said that the Sanhedrin would not get involved in politics: "I'm not afraid of the Supreme Court, the police or the attorney general. A rabbi is also permitted to engage in public issues, but to do so he has to have all the appropriate material before him, whether he is dealing with the kosher status of a chicken or the disengagement."

Under the influence of Rabbi Steinsaltz, the Sanhedrin project shifted away from idealistic projects of its first year and tried to move toward broadening participation. Steinsaltz requested that the new Sanhedrin not be referred to as "the Sanhedrin", but requested modest references to the current institution as the nascent Sanhedrin, the developing Sanhedrin, the Sanhedrin project, or simply the Rabbinical Court of 71 judges (Beis din shel 71). Steinsaltz was reportedly changing the direction of the new Sanhedrin, widening the scope and acceptance of the Court with the intention of moving towards becoming the full Sanhedrin.

According to their website, the strategy to gain wider acceptance and "provide a smooth transition from current halachic leadership to a full Sanhedrin", is to follow these guidelines: absolute adherence to traditional Rabbinic authorities and procedure; caution and conservatism; independence from any other organization; scholarship; and an open dialog with the Torah sages and current halachic leadership (with the eventual goal of their participation). On their forum it was put this way, "the [new] Sanhedrin should hold no surprises. It should be as comfortable as opening a Gemara [Talmud] or as familiar as reading the Shulchan Arukh. It should be the embodiment of Judaism as we know it today."

In 2008, Rabbi Steinsaltz resigned from his position.

== The current Sanhedrin's view of government ==
The new Sanhedrin's website portrays the Sanhedrin as a form of Rabbinic Parliament, part of a bicameral system that they claim reflects traditional Jewish government. They claim that this model has influenced the organizational structure of many Western European legislatures. (Note: Examples are given concerning division of authority, the name "Senate", even semicircle seating.) They describe the roles of an upper and lower house:

- The Sanhedrin is described as a "House of Scholars". This body represents the "rights and obligations" of the people to the "Torah Constitution" which they define as including "the Torah, Talmud and body of Rabbinic Jurisprudence that has been built up over our history as a people".
- A parallel "Congressional Assembly" represents the "democratic needs of the population". It is conceived as being derived from the royal court of a constitutional monarchy, in a democratic society it would consist of an assembly of regionally elected representatives, represented by voting power. (The head of the lower house was traditionally the Monarch, or in a modern times a Prime Minister. He would have the power to collect taxes and would be the head of the executive branch of government. He would be subordinate only to the Sanhedrin.)

The Sanhedrin would function as an equal legislative body to a democratically elected body, but it would also function as a supreme judicial body with regard to interpreting basic law, or what they call a "Torah Constitution". It appears that this structure in the Sanhedrin context implies a democracy functioning within a Torah Constitution. From an Israeli point of view this implies adding a second house to the Legislature, changing the Knesset electoral system from nationwide Proportional Representation to First-past-the-Post voting, and declaring a Basic Law requiring Israeli civil law to function within Jewish law.

=== Torah constitution ===
This agenda requires a focus on efforts to institute a theocratic or critocratic system of government in which "the authority of government depends on Jewish law", so that secular government institutions and laws would be subordinate to, and function within, Jewish law as determined by the Sanhedrin. The Sanhedrin has declared itself to have authority to veto democratically enacted laws which it determines are contrary to the laws of Torah. It has made this very clear in, among other pronouncements, its "Decision of the Sanhedrin concerning the State Elections". The Sanhedrin announced that it is seeking a state in which any matters contrary to what Jewish law defines are "issues that cannot be decided by vote":

Torah "Basic Law": Laws which are contrary to the laws of the Torah are not laws of the Jewish people, and therefore they are invalid. Any law which is contrary to the laws of Torah, legislated by the "Knesset" (including legislated amendments) or interpreted as such by judicial sources is a disqualified law. The authority to decide in these matters has been unconditionally expropriated by the central religious court based on the Torah (Bible) [the Sanhedrin].

In an exercise of its claim to authority over "matters concerning the Land of Israel", the Sanhendrin has issued a series of decisions declaring the Israeli pullout from Gaza invalid. In a statement, the Sanhedrin prohibited Jews from cooperating with the Government, saying: "The Prime Minister's program of uprooting stands in direct contradiction to the Torah of Israel", "the decision of this government ... is null and void", "No Jew is permitted to cooperate" and "Any Jew – including a soldier or policeman – who supports the uprooting ... transgresses a large number of Torah commandments."

Commenting on the war against Hizbollah in August 2006, the new Sanhedrin also claimed that it is the only authorized national institution to deal with the legal aspects of warfare and to give policy directives to the State concerning warfare. It claims that enacting legislation concerning warfare always has been a distinguishing feature of the historical Sanhedrin.

== The current attempted Sanhedrin's actions ==
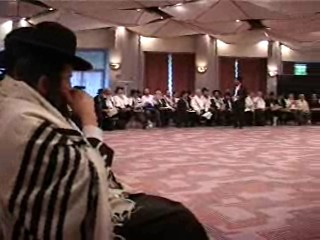
Sanhedrin in session, 2005

A great deal of discussion on the Sanhedrin forum appears to indicate that the new Sanhedrin is currently taken up with philosophical discussions about the theory of Jewish Law. The point is repeatedly made that the Sanhedrin "must solve many complex halakhic issues" before it can begin to make any statement or decision in terms of Jewish law. It claims its projects are "coordinated in complete consultation with the Gedolei Hador (leading halachic authorities of the generation) as well as with the Israeli Government Authorities, academics and professionals.... The Sanhedrin Initiative seeks to empower Jews to perform national mitzvot that thanks to technological advances and/or sociological developments are currently or imminently in the realm of the possible. The Initiative is staffed by accomplished scholars and academics striving to promote dignified Jewish freedom of religious expression which is consistent with the values of Western democracy. The Sanhedrin Initiative adheres to the criteria of halakha (Jewish law), expertise, amenity and peace in... all its... projects." The Hebrew version adds that it "has no connection with extremist groups, right wing political parties, or those who disregard Jewish law." Events as portrayed by the media, however, have not always fit this picture:

- The new Sanhedrin formed a committee to collect opinions as to the exact location of the Temple on Temple Mount.
- Some of its members ascended to a portion of the Temple Mount that was added by Herod and is considered permitted to Jews according to some opinions.
- This visit culminated in a declaration that the "Jewish people should begin collecting supplies for the rebuilding of the Temple".
- They have announced ties with various academic scholars and institutions.
- They issued religious rulings on the formulation of the Rachem prayer for Tisha B'Av services, the kashrut of pheasant and quail, and the proper formulation of the Birkhat HaMazon (grace after meals).
- There was dialogue with the Ministry of Education over "the Bible and Scriptures curriculum".
- They support Jewish settlement of the West Bank and opposed the Gaza withdrawal.
- An Israeli court allowed a defendant to consult a ruling from a subordinate court of the Sanhedrin.
- Since February 2006, the nascent Sanhedrin has been represented on the Internet by the 'Friends of the Sanhedrin'.
- They supported religious and right wing parties in the 2006 Israeli Elections.
- During the Lebanon War, they offered extensive opinions in the area of war and military policy. (Note: Based on the Mishnah's statement "they may not send forth (the people) to a Milchemet Reshut (non-mandatory war) except by order of the court of seventy-one", Mishnah Sanhedrin 1:5 the new Sanhedrin has declared that it is "the authorized institution to decide in matters of military policy, issues definitive moral guidance to soldiers on active duty and in the reserves.)
- They opposed the Gay Pride parade in Jerusalem in September 2006 (which was canceled), declaring participation in the security operations for the parade a criminal act.
- They issued repeated calls for soldiers and policemen to disobey orders that the nascent Sanhedrin regards as contrary to Jewish law.
- They blew the shofar on Rosh Hashanah in September 2006, which fell on a Shabbat. This was essentially a claim to the rights and authority of a true Sanhedrin.
- Summoned an IDF officer who issued restraining orders for several residents of the West Bank to appear before the nascent Sanhedrin. This resulted in a Police investigation of the Rabbis who issued the summons. However the reaction of the new Sanhedrin was defiant.
- Their annual public conference in 2007 included calls for the public to support a government based on Jewish Law.
- For Passover 2007, they led a drive to offer the passover sacrifice on the Temple Mount.
- In May 2007, they launched a diplomatic peace initiative aimed at averting a conflict between Israel and Iran, and resolving the issue of the Temple Mount.
- In August 2007, at the request of the Falun Gong, the new Sanhedrin was to deliberate persecution of the movement by Chinese regime.
- In October 2007, several members of the new Sanhedrin ascended to the Temple Mount and began saying short prayers on the mount, with the apparent support of the Israeli government.
- In January 2008, they wrote a letter to U.S. President George W. Bush during his visit to Israel requesting that he not divide Jerusalem. The letter was delivered by former Sephardic Chief Rabbi, Rabbi Mordechai Eliyahu.
- August 13, 2009 the Sanhedrin ruled that Jews in the land of Israel cannot sell or rent the land of Israel to non Jews
- In 2016 the Sanhedrin ruled that the conditions for counting the Jubilee Year existed.
- On October 3, 2017 silver trumpets were blown by the Sanhedrin on the Temple Mount.
- In September 2019 the Sanhedrin hosted the first conference for the Organization of 70 Nations. The organization will bring together all of the nations under the common belief in the sanctity of the Bible and the sanctity of all of mankind.
- In February 2022, the Sanhedrin has a noahide-court.
- In 7 February 2024 the Sanhedrin called For No deal for the hostages until Hamas is entirely eliminated.
- In February 2024 the Sanhedrin called on the Government of Israel to reject the International Court of Justice.
- In September 2024 the Sanhedrin called upon Crypto-Jews (Those who had been forced to convert to other religions or became atheists) to return to the Torah and the Land of Israel
- In November 2024 Sanhedrin Announces Ruling: All Jews Worldwide Must Come Home to Israel Immediately. In response to a ruling from the Sahedrin calling on all Jews in galat to go up to Israel, a letter of 30 December 2024 from remnant of Jews in Sudan and Ethiopia who have declared their willingness to go up to Israel
- March 13, 2025 Sanhedrin Announces Ruling: Hamas is Amalek, must be entirely wiped out.
- October 31, 2025 Sanhedrin Calls for Rallies with Released Hostages, Declaration of Sovereignty Over Gaza.

== Controversy ==
In response to criticism, a spokesperson said:

The rebirth of the Sanhedrin is a slow, ongoing process. Although it makes headlines and many like to highlight its controversy, it is in truth a humble project by rabbis from all sides of the Torah world joining together simply to fulfill a Torah commandment. Rather than a source of religious division, God forbid, it is a vehicle to bring about Jewish unity and civil justice, to help repair some of the deepest rifts in our society, and to provide an active, exemplary and unified Torah leadership so lacking in our times."

The new Sanhedrin has generated a great deal of debate about its purpose and potential. While most Jews see the new Sanhedrin as an attempt by a fringe group to re-establish the Temple, some have seen it as a potential vehicle to champion a specific cause.

=== The debate stirred within the National Religious camp ===
The National Religious camp took great interest in the new Sanhedrin with the hope that it may be useful in preventing the disengagement from Gaza. The Arutz-7 news service ran approximately 30 articles covering the actions of the new Sanhedrin in a positive light. The new Sanhedrin came out with several strongly worded, yet muted, rulings against "disengagement". They strongly disagreed with the government action, advocated non-violent protests, but fell short of condoning any form of stronger protest to prevent expulsion from Gaza or Hebron as had been hoped for by some members of the National Religious camp. Coverage of the new Sanhedrin since "disengagement" by the Arutz-7 news service has been almost non-existent since that event.

During the 2006 Israeli elections, the new Sanhedrin was widely expected by the National Religious to fully endorse the political party of Baruch Marzel. Instead the Sanhedrin released a general statement, echoing statements by most of the Hareidi parties, that "one is obligated to vote, and one must vote for a religious party".

In 2006, representative leadership of the new Sanhedrin issued a statement against the permissibility of conscientious objection to participation in the war in Lebanon with mixed reactions from the National Religious camp.

=== The debate stirred within the Haredi camp ===
==== Haredi Leadership ====
When Rabbi Yehudah Leib Maimon in 1949 tried to form a Sanhedrin out of the Israeli Chief Rabbinate, leading rabbis of the Haredi world repeatedly voiced their strong opposition in a number of declarations. The Brisker Rav, the Chazon Ish and others were some of the more vocal opponents of that initiative. Rabbi Avraham Yeshayah Karelitz, (the Chazon Ish) quotes the Radvaz that no one is fit to renew the Sanhedrin. He concluded that any discussion of the topic in this "orphaned generation" is ludicrous.

However, although there is clear Haredi opposition to the new 'Sanhedrin', unlike the case of Rabbi Yehudah Leib Maimon's attempt, there has been no official response by any Haredi leader or Jewish Court (Beit Din) to this 'Sanhedrin'. The 'Sanhedrin' itself claims that the current attempt is very different from the previous attempt and that leading sages like Rabbi Yosef Sholom Eliashiv, Rabbi Ovadia Yosef, Rabbi Moshe Halberstam, and Rabbi Zalman Nechemia Goldberg, have expressed support for, and consented to, the renewal of Semikhah. To date, none of these Rabbis have commented on these claims. It has been met, in public at least, by silence. The new Sanhedrin itself and its supporters claim that it proves there is quiet support. The Haredi community however interprets this to mean that the new Sanhedrin is simply another fringe group not worthy of comment, or even a fabrication.

==== Haredi community and media ====
The lack of response by the leadership has given pause, but has generally reinforced the feeling in the Haredi world that the 'Sanhedrin' is a complete non-issue, and it is generally ignored by the Haredi press. It is considered a fringe group and is considered unrelated to the Haredi community.

The members of the new Sanhedrin are not considered as belonging to the Haredi community. The Lithuanian Haredi Yated newspaper, which expresses the official opinion of the Lithuanian Haredi rabbinical establishment, has run several articles condemning Rabbi Yisrael Ariel and his 'Temple Institute' using the expression "poisonous opinions". It appears, however, that this opinion is not shared by all the Haredi communities. The Yated has also run articles condemning Rabbi Adin Steinsaltz, referring to strongly worded comments made by Rabbi Elazar Shach in 1989. (Note: Dei'ah veDibur: Opinion & Comment, Purity in Education by Rabbi N.Z. Grossman It is disputed whether Rabbi Elazar Shach really opposed Rabbi Adin Steinsaltz in his final days, as it is claimed that Rabbi Steinsalz met with the rabbinical court in Jerusalem (Edah HaChareidis) making required changes and thereby resolving the issue.) It is clear that Rabbi Adin Steinsaltz' untraditional and 'university oriented' approach is at odds with the Haredi approach. While not all leading members of the Sanhedrin have generated such controversy, and some members like Rabbi Yoel Schwartz are generally recognized as scholars within the Haredi community, they are generally unknown figures.

In addition, the new Sanhedrin is seen as identifying with the extreme-right factions of the National Religious movement because some of its members ascended to a portion of the Temple Mount. While there is disagreement between various orthodox groups on this point, and Maimonides (Note: Maimonides specifically states that there are areas on the temple mount that we are permitted to enter today even when all Jews are ritually unclean. He writes that in 1165 he visited Jerusalem and went up on to the Temple Mount and prayed in the great, holy house (probably the Al-Aqsa mosque). (Sefer HaCharedim Mitzvat Tshuva Chapter 3)) and the Radbaz ascended to the Temple Mount, modern Haredi legal opinions as well as many National-Religious authorities, including the Israeli Chief Rabbinate, do not allow this. As Yated Neeman writes, "all halachic authorities categorically forbid it."

==== Conclusion ====
Although the new Sanhedrin claims that it is in touch and even coordinating with some Haredi leaders, no basis to support these claims can be found. The overriding response to the new Sanhedrin by the Haredi community has been driven by the fact that leadership of the new Sanhedrin is unknown or controversial, and the decisions of the new Sanhedrin are perceived as identifying with the extreme wings of the National Religious community. The Haredi community tends to simply ignore the new Sanhedrin or ridicule it.

=== Yemenite opinion ===
Rabbi Yosef Qafih, former Chief Rabbi of Yemen, wrote in his commentary to the Mishnah tractate Sanhedrin that it would be a very good thing to reinstate the Sanhedrin in our days. However, he held, according to the position of the Rambam, that this could only be done by assembling all leading Torah scholars physically together at one time. (Note: Cf. Maimonides' Mishneh Torah, Hilchos Sanhedrin, Rabbi Yosef Qafih edition)

=== The debate stirred within the Kahanist camp ===
Rabbi Nachman Kahane is a leading member of the new Sanhedrin. His brother Rabbi Meir Kahane was widely known for his outspoken political views. Rabbi Nachman Kahane, a graduate of Yeshivat Mir, is not known for his political views and is generally acknowledged to be an accomplished Torah scholar by the Mizrachi (Religious Zionism) and Haredi communities.

The new Sanhedrin is often mentioned on political websites run by movements associated with the assassinated right-wing Rabbi Meir Kahane, and in general it seems that they support both the concept of the new Sanhedrin, and the possibility of religious government of the State of Israel.

=== The debate stirred within the "Temple Mount Faithful" camp ===
In the first year of operation, the new Sanhedrin was involved with discussions about the Temple Mount. It formed a committee to collect opinions as to its exact location. Some of its members ascended to a portion of the Temple mount that was added by Herod and considered by rabbis associated with the Temple Mount Faithful movement to be permitted to Jews. This visit culminated in a declaration that the "Jewish people should begin collecting supplies for the rebuilding of the Temple".

Since the acceptance of the position of Nasi by Rabbi Adin Steinsaltz, discussion of issues concerning the Temple Mount has greatly diminished.

These early actions by the new Sanhedrin were announced and followed closely by websites associated with the Temple Mount Faithful movement. However, for at least a year since the new Sanhedrin's "Temple supplies" declaration, it appears that no additional material or discussions concerning the new Sanhedrin have been added to these websites.

=== The debate stirred among non-Jews, especially Evangelical Protestants ===
Some Christians, including evangelist Hal Lindsey see the reinstated Sanhedrin as good news, believing that the Sanhedrin would be responsible for the rebuilding of the Third Temple, which would eventually be desecrated by the false Messiah during the end times and inhabited by the true Messiah during the period of Christian eschatology referred to as the Millennial Reign.

The Sanhedrin has also selected a group of non-Jewish advisors, scholars and teachers from the Noahide movement - including Vendyl Jones, to form a High Council of Noahides responsible for outreach education from within the non-Jewish world.
