= Yaakov Ariel =

Israeli religious Zionist rabbi

Rabbi Yaakov Ariel
- יעקב אריאל
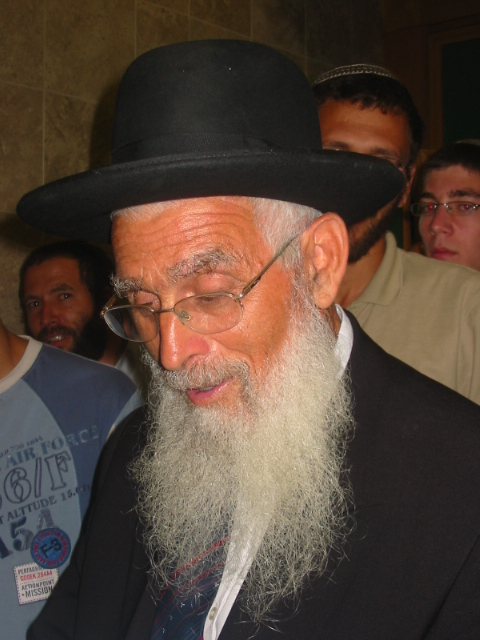
- Ariel in 2007

Chief Rabbi of Ramat Gan

Rosh Yeshiva of Yamit

Personal life
- Born: October 16, 1937 (age 88) Jerusalem, British Palestine
- Occupation: Rabbi

Religious life
- Religion: Judaism
- Movement: Religious Zionism

Yaakov Ariel (Hebrew: יעקב אריאל; born October 16, 1937) is the former chief rabbi of the city of Ramat Gan, Israel, and a cofounder of Gush Emunim (גוש אמונים, lit. 'Bloc of the Faithful'), an Israeli ultranationalist organization. Ariel served as a rosh yeshiva in the abandoned Israeli settlement of Yamit in the Sinai Peninsula until 1982; the year he took the role is unknown. Ariel is the president of the Ramat Gan Yeshiva, the roshei yeshiva of which are rabbis Yehoshua Shapira and Ben-Tzion Moshe Elgazi. He also served as the rabbi of Kfar Maimon for roughly 25 years.

Born in Jerusalem, Ariel learned at Yeshivat Kfar HaRoeh, Yeshivat Kerem B'Yavneh, Midrashiat Noam in Pardes Hana, and Mercaz HaRav in Jerusalem. At Mercaz HaRav, he was a disciple of Rabbi Zvi Yehuda HaCohen Kook.

In 2003, Ariel was a leading candidate for Ashkenazi Chief Rabbi of Israel but lost due to opposition from the Haredi bloc. His brother, Rabbi Yisrael Ariel, is the former chief rabbi of Yamit and founder of the Temple Institute.

In September 2017, Rabbi Ariel announced that, having reached the age of 80, he was stepping down as rabbi of Ramat Gan.

== His Pupils ==
- Rabbi Shlomo Levi, chief rabbi of Kiryat Shmona.
- Rabbi Yehuda Amichay, the rabbi of Torah and the Land institute.

== Books ==
- Rising from the Desert (עולה מן המדבר)—about the building and destruction of Yamit.
- In the Tent of the Torah (באוהלה של התורה)—answers to halakhic questions in five volumes.
- From the tents of Torah (מאוהלי התורה)—essays on the Jewish festivals and the Chumash in two volumes.
- Halakha in Our Times (הלכה בימינו)
- He Who Dwells in Tents (יושב אוהלים)—lectures on Talmudic tractates Ketubot and Kiddushin.
