= Jewish fundamentalism =

Jewish anti-modernist movements based on biblical literalism

Jewish fundamentalism (Hebrew: פונדמנטליזם יהודי) refers to fundamentalism in the context of Judaism. The term fundamentalism was originally used in reference to Christian fundamentalism, a Protestant movement which emphasizes a belief in biblical literalism. Today, it is commonly used in reference to movements that oppose modernist, liberal, and ecumenical tendencies within societies, as well as modernist, liberal, and ecumenical tendencies within specific religions, and it is often coupled with extremist ideologies and/or political movements. The use of this definition is important in a Jewish context because the two movements which are most commonly associated with Jewish fundamentalism, Religious Zionism and Haredi Judaism, stray far from biblical literalism due to the importance of the Oral Law within Judaism.

== Overview ==
Like other fundamentalist movements, fundamentalist Judaism usually presents itself as the only valid form of Judaism, Jewish culture, and truth. However, Religious Zionism and Haredi Judaism, the two movements which are most broadly associated with Jewish fundamentalism, differ in significant ways, and historically, they have sometimes opposed each other (but recently, there has been more overlap, partly due to the rise of the Hardal movement). Religious Zionism is more associated with political extremism, while Haredi Judaism is associated with men studying Torah every day and making sure all actions are in line with the will of God.

== Haredi Judaism ==
Haredi Judaism consists of groups within Orthodox Judaism that are characterized by their strict adherence to halakha (Jewish law) and traditions, in opposition to modern values and practices. Its members are usually referred to as ultra-Orthodox in English; however, the term "ultra-Orthodox" is considered pejorative by many of its adherents, who prefer terms like strictly Orthodox or Haredi. Haredi Jews regard themselves as the most religiously authentic group of Jews, but other movements of Judaism disagree.

== Religious Zionism ==
Religious Zionism is an ideology that combines Zionism and Orthodox Judaism. It primarily began with the teachings of Rabbi Abraham Isaac Kook (1865–1935), who saw Zionism as a part of a divine scheme to return Jews to their ancestral homeland, and eventually bring about the coming of the Messiah. Religious Zionism gained a new momentum after the Six-Day War in 1967, when Israel conquered the West Bank, a territory which is rich in Biblical Jewish history. The Gush Emunim movement took off under the leadership of Zvi Yehuda Kook, and it also spearheaded the proliferation of Israeli settlements in the newly conquered territory.

Religious Zionism is still a relatively broad term which encompasses both moderate and extreme elements. The extremist elements are frequently associated with anti-Arab racism, anti-Palestinianism, and violence; frequently, they are associated with ideological inspiration from Kahanism. They have also been associated with terrorism against Palestinians, and in some cases, they have also been associated with terrorism against the Israel Defense Forces. The Hilltop Youth movement is especially associated with the most extreme forms of Religious Zionism.

== Study ==
Jewish fundamentalism was ignored for much of the 20th century, and it was only when it began to have an effect on Israeli politics and international relations that scholars began to study it in earnest.

== See also ==
- Agudat Yisrael
- Biblical criticism
- Criticism of the Bible
- Criticism of Israel
- Criticism of Judaism
- Degel HaTorah
- Extremism
- Far-right politics in Israel
- Halachic state
- Hyperreligiosity
- Jerusalem syndrome
- Jewish supremacy
- Jewish terrorism
- Jewish religious movements
- Jewish schisms
- Jewish views on religious pluralism
- Judaism and politics
- Judaism and violence
- Judaizers
  - Noahidism
  - Subbotniks
- Meir Kahane
  - Jewish Defense League
  - Jewish Defense Organization
  - Kach (political party)
- Noam (political party)
- Nonviolent extremism
- Otzma Yehudit
- Racism in Jewish communities
  - Racism in Israel
- Radicalization
- Religious fanaticism
- Religious Zionist Party
- Scrupulosity
- Shas
- Sikrikim
- The Temple Institute
- United Torah Judaism
- Zionist political violence
