= Vendyl Jones =

American archaeologist (1930–2010)

Vendyl Miller Jones (May 29, 1930 – December 27, 2010) was an American Noahide scholar who directed archaeological searches for biblical artifacts such as the Ark of the Covenant.

Portrait of Vendyl Jones

== Biography ==
Vendyl was born in Sudan, Texas. He received his bachelor's degree in divinity, and a master's degree in theology from the Baptist Bible College also studying at the Southwestern Baptist Theological Seminary, He later took advanced studies at the Bowen Biblical Museum under Dr. & Mrs. William Bowen and Biblical Archaeologist, W.F. Albright.

Between 1955 and 1956, Jones was pastor of the Dungan Chapel Baptist Church located in Carter County in Northeast Tennessee. Vendyl came to believe that many apparently anti-Jewish statements in the gospels were "omitted in more ancient manuscripts" basing this claim on the "marginal notes" of an unidentified Bible.

In October 1956, Jones resigned the pastorate and moved to Greenville, South Carolina where he began his studies in the Talmud-Torah (a children's elementary religious school) under Rabbi Henry Barneis.

Vendyl lectured for the Biblical Research Society from 1964 to 1967. He then established the Judaic-Christian Research Foundation, which later gave birth to the Institute of Judaic-Christian Research (IJCR), which has now become Vendyl Jones Research Institutes.

In 1964, the Journal of Near Eastern Studies reported the 1952 discovery of the Marble Tablets in Beirut, Lebanon. That same year the Copper Scroll was found in Cave #3 at Qumran, West Bank, which listed the hiding places of 64 sacred articles which included the Tabernacle and the Ark of the Covenant.

=== Move to Israel ===
In April 1967, Jones moved his family to Israel to continue his studies in the Department of Judaica at Hebrew University. Here, Jones became involved in the archaeological aspects of Israel. He aided the Israeli army during the Six-Day War. His assistance was in the role of being a spotter, since his color-blindness allowed him to spot camouflage. After the Six-Day War, he was on the Steckoll/Haas excavation team at Qumran, authorized by the Jordanian Department of Antiquities before the war. Shortly thereafter, Vendyl's excavations were continued under Israeli authority through the status quo Law.

In the years following, Jones continued to work in the Judean wilderness with his friend and mentor Pessah Bar-Adon. Jones also worked at Tel Debir (Kirjath Sepher) with Professor Moshe Kohavi and Anson Rainey; the University of Tel Aviv and the Citadel of Herod the Great in Jerusalem with Professor Hillel Geva.

After 1972, Vendyl conducted eight excavations at Qumran, involving over 300 volunteers and funded by individual supporters of VJRI. There has been no support nor funding from the government, foundations, or grants. Jones's methods, claims and qualifications have been disputed by academics such as Joe Zias and Robert Elliot Friedman, and Jones has been denied digging permits by the Israeli authorities.

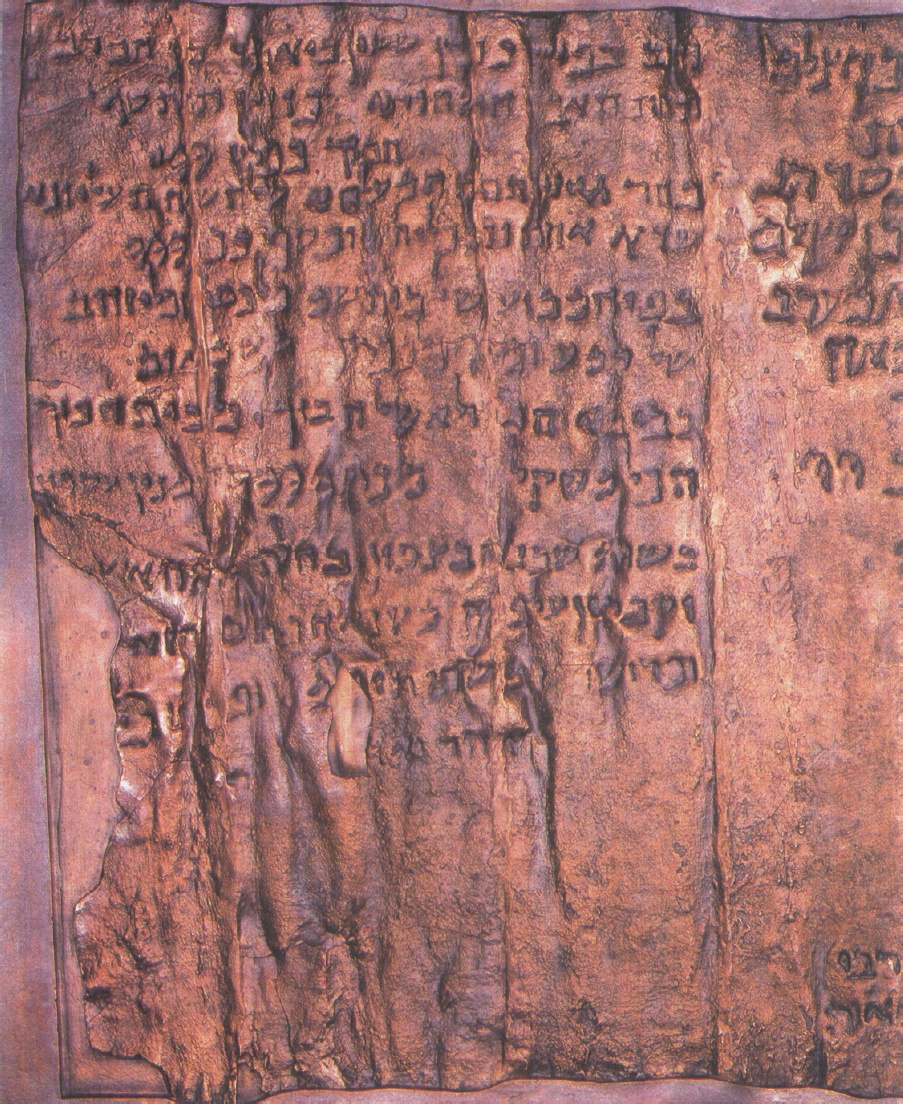
Part of the Copper Scroll. The discovery of this item inspired Vendyl Jones to search for such items as the Holy Anointing Oil and the Temple Incense.

In 1988 an excavation team led by Jones found a small Herodian period jug in a cave near Qumran containing what was possibly balsamic oil, a type of oil which may have been used to anoint some Israelite kings. Jones stated that this was the original balm of Gilead. This was originally considered to be genuine and was publicised in the media.

In the 1992 excavation, the VJRI team announced the discovery of a hidden silo in the bedrock that contained a reddish snuff-looking material that appeared to be organic in nature. His description was analyzed by Zohar Amar of Bar-Ilan University who noted that "According to Jones, the site where the red material was found corresponds exactly to the description of the ‘‘Cave of the Column” referred to in the Copper Scroll." Amar criticises Jones for being selective with his data, omitting material that challenges his claims. While Jones never sent him a physical sample for analysis, he concludes that the substance found by Jones "is a cleaning material known in the ancient Hebrew as "borit" [lye] which was produced in this region by the inhabitants of Qumran and was one of their industries."

Jones believed his archaeology to have eschatological significance, and that when he found the ancient religious items he was looking for, God would be revealed to the world, all Jews will return to Israel, and there would be peace in the Middle East. Also, Israeli democracy will be replaced by a Sanhedrin, not unlike the group that was formed by various Israeli rabbis in 2004, and with which Jones was closely associated. In May 2005, it was reported that he had consulted with Kabbalists and that he believed he would find the Ark of the Covenant by August 14, 2005, the anniversary of the destruction of the Jerusalem Temple. However, as the date approached and passed he claimed that this was a misquote. He then hoped that a drill-hole bore would reveal the Ark's location in September, but was prevented from proceeding due to lack of funds and the need for another environmental study required by the government.

== Noahide movement ==
Vendyl Jones was active in the Noahide movement, also known as Bnei Noach.

While attempting to find or grow a red heifer in order to revive the ancient temple rituals, Jones was an active member in the 2004 attempt to revive the Sanhedrin along with Rabbi Yisrael Ariel head of The Temple Institute, and later worked with the President of the Sanhedrin Rabbi Adin Steinzaltz. Following this the "Sanhedrin Institute for Noahide Development" was established, with Vendyl leading it on behalf of the Noahides and Yeshayahu Hollander for the Sanhedrin. This movement was prominent in a court case brought before the Sanhedrin, where a German Noahide settler was living in a contested settlement near Susya, Har Hevron and being evicted due to complaints by the Jewish settlers from nearby Bet Yatir, along with complaints by Arab former cave inhabitants in the vicinity who had been evicted. A Jewish convert and former Noahide Yakov Talia (formerly Jacobs Johannes from South-Africa) living in a nearby farm was summoned to intervene and support the settler, and although the Jewish settlers abstained from continued actions, the Israeli courts had the settlement dismantled. It was also instrumental in the Sanhedrin's attempt to solve the conflict between Iran and Israel, and The Sanhedrin's attempt to unify between the Bedouins of Israel and the Israeli Jews.

After he died the Noahide Nations organization created the Vendyl Jones Scholarship Fund.

== Indiana Jones ==
Jones also claimed to have been the subject of a movie script that was circulated in Hollywood, and which he claimed inspired the character of Indiana Jones. He dedicates a chapter to the subject in his book A Door of Hope: My Search for the Treasures of the Copper Scroll stating he never claimed to be the basis for Indiana Jones. He states, "I cannot help that my name is Jones and that I happen to be looking for, among other things, the Ark... Admittedly, I have enjoyed the notoriety that the film created.. however I want to make it clear once and for all, that I have never stood up and declared, 'I am the real Indiana Jones.'"

According to the story, a certain Randolph Fillmore, who had been on one of Jones's digs, wrote the first draft for Raiders of the Lost Ark; Vendyl became "Endy", then "Indy". According to the now defunct Vendyl Jones website: "In 1977, a young man volunteered for one of our archaeological digs. His name was Randy Filmore. He wrote a screenplay based on Vendyl's experiences and titled it "The Search for the Ashes of the Red Heifer." Upon returning to the States, Randy contacted Vendyl with the news that he'd found representation for his script in Hollywood. To this day, Vendyl has not heard from Filmore. When Vendyl recounts this story to the press, they often misinterpret it as a claim by Vendyl that he and Indy are the same."

However, accounts of the making of the film flatly contradict this. Philip Kaufman and George Lucas came up with the idea of an archaeologist hunting for the Ark, while Indiana was the name of Lucas's Alaskan Malamute. The character was to be named Indiana Smith after Nevada Smith (Steve McQueen's character in the eponymous film), and this was changed to Indiana Jones by Steven Spielberg. In his book he adds, "did Fillmore's script make its way to the West Coast and into the hands of a producer who showed it to Kaufman? Did it cross the desk of Spielberg or Lucas? I really don't know, nor do I care."

More recently, the FAQ section of Jones's web page has stated that, "It may be hard to believe but Vendyl has no connection with the popular motion picture character [Indiana Jones]. He has never received any money from the producers of the movie. And he's never asked."

Other men more frequently identified as the inspiration for Indiana Jones are Hiram Bingham III, Colonel Percy Fawcett and Roy Chapman Andrews. A Smithsonian Channel analysis concludes that the similarities to these men was indirect, with explorers like these serving as the model for heroes in adventure films of the 1940s and 1950s, which inspired writers like Lucas.

== Works ==
In 1983, Vendyl published Will the Real Jesus Please Stand?. The book covers material he had previously released on cassette tapes addressing seven riddles of Israel and the Messiah.

In 2005 the book A Door of Hope: My Search for the Treasures of the Copper Scroll was published. In it, Jones discusses his childhood, move to Israel and digs for archaeological artifacts. He ends with stating that although he may not have found the lost ark, he found camaraderie with his co-workers and volunteers stating "...my search for the treasures of the Copper Scroll has allowed me to learn from some of the finest minds driven by the biggest hearts... maybe I found what I was seeking." (page 226)

While running the Institute for Judaic-Christian Research, he published a newsletter, The Researcher, which went out to his supporters.

== Death ==
On December 27, 2010, Jones died from throat cancer. His funeral took place in Grandview, Texas.
