= Noahidism =

Jewish new religious movement

The rainbow is the unofficial symbol of Noahidism, recalling the Genesis flood narrative in which a rainbow appears to Noah after the Flood; it represents God's promise to Noah to refrain from flooding the Earth and destroying all life again.

Noahidism (/ˈnoʊəhaɪdɪzəm/) or Noachidism (/ˈnoʊəxaɪdɪzəm/) is a monotheistic Jewish religious movement aimed at non-Jews, based upon the Seven Laws of Noah and their traditional interpretations within Orthodox Judaism.

According to the Jewish law, non-Jews (Gentiles) are not obligated to convert to Judaism, but they are required to observe the Seven Laws of Noah to be assured of a place in the World to Come (Olam Ha-Ba), the final reward of the righteous. The penalty for violating any of the Noahide laws is discussed in the Talmud, but in practical terms it is subject to the working legal system which is established by the society at large. Those who subscribe to the observance of the Noahic Covenant are referred to as Bnei Noach (Hebrew: בני נח, "Sons of Noah") or Noahides (/ˈnoʊ.əhaɪdz/). The modern Noahide movement was founded in the 1990s by Orthodox Jewish rabbis from Israel, mainly tied to Chabad-Lubavitch and religious Zionist organizations, including the Temple Institute.

Historically, the Hebrew term Bnei Noach has been applied to all non-Jews as descendants of Noah. However, nowadays it is primarily used to refer specifically to those "Righteous Gentiles" who observe the Seven Laws of Noah. Noahide communities have spread and developed primarily in the United States, United Kingdom, Latin America, Nigeria, the Philippines, and Russia. According to a Noahide source in 2018, there are over 20,000 official Noahides around the world and the country with the greatest number is the Philippines.

== Noahic Covenant ==
The scriptural and theological basis for the seven commandments of the Noahic Covenant is said to be derived interpretatively from demands addressed to Adam and to Noah, who are believed to be the progenitors of humankind in Judaism, and therefore to be regarded as universal moral laws. The seven commandments of the Noahic Covenant enumerated in the Babylonian Talmud (Avodah Zarah 8:4, Sanhedrin 56a-b) are:

1. Do not worship idols.
2. Do not curse God.
3. Do not murder.
4. Do not commit adultery or sexual immorality.
5. Do not steal.
6. Do not eat flesh torn from a living animal.
7. Establish courts of justice.

According to the American Roman Catholic priest and dogmatic theologian Bruce R. Barnes, the obligation to follow the Noahic Covenant and its seven commandments was incumbent upon the Jewish people as well, and remained effective for them until the Ten Commandments were given to Moses on Mount Sinai:

With the giving of the Torah, God chose a people to live by His Commandments. This is a critical moment for those who believe that revelation is the only authentic expression of law. Such individuals think that the Revealed Law predominates and that the Noahide Laws are absorbed into the Mosaic Laws, thereby losing their independence. This unification of the two sets of law during the revelation at Sinai strengthened and confirmed (rather than diminished) the obligation for non-Jews to follow the Noahide Laws. Righteous Gentiles were obliged to follow the Seven Commandments and, by association, the Sinaitic Commandments because the Noahide Laws were now considered subsumed into the Sinai Laws. This did not alter the distinction between the two sets of people who followed the respective laws. [...] The relationship between the Noahites and the Jews would always be similar to the relationship between a priest and a faithful layman. The obligation to follow the Noahide Laws was incumbent upon the Jews from Adam to the Revelation at Sinai. Virtually all Jewish thinkers who dealt with this issue kept this in mind.

== Historical precedents ==
The concept of "Righteous Gentiles" (gerim toshavim) has a few precedents in the history of Judaism, primarily during Biblical times and the Roman domination of the Mediterranean. In the Hebrew Bible, it is reported that the legal status of ger toshav (Biblical Hebrew: גר תושב, ger: "foreigner" or "alien" + toshav: "resident", lit. 'resident alien') was granted to those Gentiles (non-Jews) living in the Land of Israel who did not want to convert to Judaism but agreed to observe the Seven Laws of Noah. The Sebomenoi or God-fearers of the Roman Empire were another ancient example of non-Jews being included within the Jewish community without converting to Judaism.

During the Golden Age of Jewish culture in the Iberian Peninsula, the medieval Jewish philosopher and rabbi Maimonides (1135–1204) wrote in the halakhic legal code Mishneh Torah (tractate Hilkhot Melakhim) that Gentiles (non-Jews) must perform exclusively the Seven Laws of Noah and might study their Seven Laws. He also states that if Gentiles willingly perform any commandment besides the Seven Laws of Noah - like charity or a sacrifice (Korban) - according to the correct halakhic procedure, they are not prevented from doing so. However, Gentiles are forbidden to rest on the Shabbat. According to Maimonides, teaching non-Jews to follow the Seven Laws of Noah is incumbent on all Jews, a commandment in and of itself. Nevertheless, the majority of rabbinic authorities over the centuries have rejected Maimonides' opinion, and the dominant halakhic consensus has always been that Jews are not required to spread the Noahide laws to non-Jews.

During the 1860s in Western Europe, the idea of Noahidism as a universal Judaic religion for non-Jews was developed by Elijah Benamozegh, an Italian Sephardic Orthodox rabbi and renowned Jewish Kabbalist. Between the years 1920s–1930s, French writer Aimé Pallière adopted the Noahide laws at the suggestion of his teacher Elijah Benamozegh; afterwards, Pallière spread Benamozegh's doctrine in Europe and never formally converted to Judaism. Modern historians argue that Benamozegh's role in the debate on Jewish universalism in the history of Jewish philosophy was focused on the Seven Laws of Noah as the means subservient to the shift of Jewish ethics from particularism to universalism, although the arguments that he used to support his universalistic viewpoint were neither original nor unheard in the history of this debate. According to Clémence Boulouque, Carl and Bernice Witten Associate Professor of Jewish and Israel Studies at Columbia University in the City of New York, Benamozegh ignored the ethnocentric biases contained in the Noahide laws, whereas some contemporary right-wing Jewish political movements have embraced them.

== Modern Noahide movement ==
Menachem Mendel Schneerson, the Lubavitcher Rebbe, encouraged his followers on many occasions to preach the Seven Laws of Noah, devoting some of his addresses to the subtleties of this code. Since the 1990s, Orthodox Jewish rabbis from Israel, most notably those affiliated to Chabad-Lubavitch and religious Zionist organizations, including The Temple Institute, have set up the modern Noahide movement. These Noahide organizations, led by religious Zionist and Orthodox Jewish rabbis, are aimed at non-Jews to proselytize among them and commit them to follow the Noahide laws. According to Rachel Z. Feldman, American anthropologist and Assistant Professor of Religious Studies at Dartmouth College, many of the Orthodox Jewish rabbis involved in mentoring Noahides are supporters of the Third Temple movement who believe that the messianic era shall begin with the establishment of a Jewish theocratic state in Israel, supported by communities of Noahides worldwide:

Today, nearly 2,000 Filipinos consider themselves members of the "Children of Noah", a new Judaic faith that is growing into the tens of thousands worldwide as ex-Christians encounter forms of Jewish learning online. Under the tutelage of Orthodox Jewish rabbis, Filipino "Noahides", as they call themselves, study Torah, observe the Sabbath, and passionately support a form of messianic Zionism. Filipino Noahides believe that Jews are a racially superior people, with an innate ability to access divinity. According to their rabbi mentors, they are forbidden from performing Jewish rituals and even reading certain Jewish texts. These restrictions have necessitated the creation of new, distinctly Noahide ritual practices and prayers modeled after Jewish ones. Filipino Noahides are practicing a new faith that also affirms the superiority of Judaism and Jewish biblical right to the Land of Israel, in line with the aims of the growing messianic Third Temple Movement in Jerusalem.

Feldman describes Noahidism as a "new world religion" that "carv[es] out a place for non-Jews in the messianic Zionist project". She characterizes Noahide ideology in the Philippines and elsewhere in the global south as having a "markedly racial dimension" constructed around "an essential categorical difference between Jews and Noahides". David Novak, professor of Jewish theology and ethics at the University of Toronto, has denounced the modern Noahide movement by stating that "If Jews are telling Gentiles what to do, it's a form of imperialism".

=== High Council of Bnei Noah ===
In 2005 a "High Council of Bnei Noah", set up to represent Noahide communities around the world, was endorsed by a group that claimed to be the new Sanhedrin. The High Council of Bnei Noah consists of a group of Noahides who, at the request of the nascent Sanhedrin, gathered in Jerusalem on 10 January 2006 to be recognized as an international Noahide organization for the purpose of serving as a bridge between the nascent Sanhedrin and Noahides worldwide. There were ten initial members who flew to Israel and pledged to uphold the Seven Laws of Noah and to conduct themselves under the authority of the Noahide beth din (religious court) of the nascent Sanhedrin.

== Acknowledgment ==
Meir Kahane and Shlomo Carlebach organized one of the first Noahide conferences in the 1980s. In 1990, Kahane was the keynote speaker at the First International Conference of the Descendants of Noah, the first Noahide gathering, in Fort Worth, Texas. After the assassination of Meir Kahane that same year, The Temple Institute, which advocates to rebuild the Third Jewish Temple on the Temple Mount in Jerusalem, started to promote the Noahide laws as well.

The Chabad-Lubavitch movement has been one of the most active in Noahide outreach, believing that there is spiritual and societal value for non-Jews in at least simply acknowledging the Noahide laws. In 1982, Chabad-Lubavitch had a reference to the Noahide laws enshrined in a U.S. Presidential proclamation: the "Proclamation 4921", signed by the then-U.S. President Ronald Reagan. The United States Congress, recalling House Joint Resolution 447 and in celebration of Menachem Mendel Schneerson's 80th birthday, proclaimed 4 April 1982, as a "National Day of Reflection".

In 1989 and 1990, they had another reference to the Noahide laws enshrined in a U.S. Presidential proclamation: the "Proclamation 5956", signed by then-President George H. W. Bush. The United States Congress, recalling House Joint Resolution 173 and in celebration of Menachem Mendel Schneerson's 87th birthday, proclaimed 16 April 1989, and 6 April 1990, as "Education Day, U.S.A."

In January 2004, the spiritual leader of the Druze community in Israel, Sheikh Mowafak Tarif, met with a representative of Chabad-Lubavitch to sign a declaration calling on all non-Jews in Israel to observe the Noahide laws; the mayor of the Arab city of Shefa-'Amr (Shfaram) also signed the document.

In March 2016, the Sephardic Chief Rabbi of Israel, Yitzhak Yosef, declared during a sermon that Jewish law requires that the only non-Jews allowed to live in Israel are obligated to follow the Noahide laws:

According to Jewish law, it's forbidden for a non-Jew to live in the Land of Israel – unless he has accepted the seven Noahide laws, [...] If the non-Jew is unwilling to accept these laws, then we can send him to Saudi Arabia, [...] When there will be full, true redemption, we will do this.

Yosef further added:

[N]on-Jews shouldn't live in the land of Israel. [...] If our hand were firm, if we had the power to rule, then non-Jews must not live in Israel. But, our hand is not firm. [...] Who, otherwise be the servants? Who will be our helpers? This is why we leave them in Israel.

Yosef's sermon sparked outrage in Israel and was fiercely criticized by several human rights associations, NGOs and members of the Knesset; Jonathan Greenblatt, Anti-Defamation League's CEO and national director, and Carole Nuriel, Anti-Defamation League's Israel Office acting director, issued a strong denunciation of Yosef's sermon:

The statement by Chief Rabbi Yosef is shocking and unacceptable. It is unconscionable that the Chief Rabbi, an official representative of the State of Israel, would express such intolerant and ignorant views about Israel's non-Jewish population – including the millions of non-Jewish citizens.

As a spiritual leader, Rabbi Yosef should be using his influence to preach tolerance and compassion towards others, regardless of their faith, and not seek to exclude and demean a large segment of Israelis.

We call upon the Chief Rabbi to retract his statements and apologize for any offense caused by his comments.

== See also ==
- Baal teshuva
- Ethical monotheism
- Ger toshav
- Groups claiming affiliation with Israelites
- Israeli citizenship law
- Jewish Christianity
  - Judaizers
  - Judeo-Christian
  - Messianic Jews
  - Subbotniks
- Proselyte
- Proselytization and counter-proselytization of Jews
  - Crypto-Jews
    - Anusim
    - Converso
    - Marrano
  - Jews for Jesus
  - New Christians
- Relations between Judaism and Christianity
  - British Israelism
  - Catholic Church and Judaism
  - Christian Zionism
  - Eastern Orthodoxy and Judaism
  - Jewish views on Jesus
    - Jesus in the Talmud
    - Rejection of Jesus
  - Protestantism and Judaism
- Relations between Judaism and Islam
- Righteous among the Nations
- Settler colonialism in Israel
- Shituf
- Sons of Noah
- Vendyl Jones
- Zera Yisrael
