= Jewish supremacy =

Belief in the superiority of Jewish people

Jewish supremacy is the belief that Jewish people are superior to gentiles. The concept of Jewish supremacy arises in some discourse about the Israeli–Palestinian conflict. According to some cultural commentators, the ethno-nationalist views, policies, and identity politics of some Israeli Jews rises to the level of a form of supremacism vis-à-vis the Palestinians, an Arab people. The term has been used by a variety of critics of Israeli policies, with some arguing that it reflects a broader pattern of discrimination against non-Jews in Israel. It has also been used by American far-right proponents of antisemitic conspiracy theories.

== Discourse ==
Ilan Pappé, an Israeli historian, writes that the First Aliyah to Israel "established a society based on Jewish supremacy" within "settlement-cooperatives" that were owned and operated by Jews. Joseph Massad, a professor of Arab studies, holds that "Jewish supremacism" has always been a "dominating principle" in religious and secular Zionism.

Since the 1990s, Orthodox Jewish rabbis from Israel, most notably those affiliated with Chabad-Lubavitch and religious Zionist organizations, including the Temple Institute, have set up a modern Noahide movement. These Noahide organizations are aimed at non-Jews in order to convince them to follow the Noahide laws. The rabbis that guide the modern Noahide movement, many of whom are affiliated with the Third Temple movement, expound an ideology that has been criticized for racism and supremacy, and consists of the belief that the Jews are God's chosen people. These organizations mentor Noahides because they believe that the Messianic era will begin with the establishment of a Jewish theocracy in Israel—including the rebuilding of the Third Temple on the Temple Mount in Jerusalem and re-institution of the Jewish priesthood—supported by communities of Noahides. David Novak, professor of Jewish theology and ethics at the University of Toronto, has denounced the modern Noahide movement, saying, "If Jews are telling Gentiles what to do, it's a form of imperialism".

In 2002, Massad said that Israel imposes a "Jewish supremacist system of discrimination" on Palestinian citizens of Israel, and that this has been normalized within the discourse on how to end the conflict, with various parties arguing that "it is pragmatic for Palestinians to accept to live in a Jewish supremacist state as third class citizens".

In 2021, the Israeli human rights organization B'Tselem classified the State of Israel as "a regime of Jewish supremacy from the Jordan River to the Mediterranean Sea" through laws amounting to apartheid. It also took note of the fact that, after it was established in 1989, it initially focused on the legal and social situation in the Israeli-occupied territories, but that "what happens in the Occupied Territories can no longer be treated as separate from the reality in the entire area under Israel’s control" because there "is one regime governing the entire area and the people living in it, based on a single organizing principle".

In the aftermath of the 2022 Israeli legislative election, the winning right-wing coalition included an alliance known as Religious Zionist Party, which Jewish-American columnist David E. Rosenberg said is "driven by Jewish supremacy and anti-Arab racism".

Proponents of the one-state solution cite the development of Jewish supremacy as one of the main reasons for the necessity of a single country that applies democratic principles across all sectors of society, regardless of ethnic or religious affiliations.

== Examples ==
Various discriminatory policies and practices have been cited as perpetrating Jewish supremacy in Israel, including the 1952 Citizenship Law and the 2018 Nation-State Law. The banned Israeli political party Kach, the phenomenon of Israeli settler violence, and all Israeli governments led by Benjamin Netanyahu have been accused of pursuing a Jewish supremacist agenda, particularly against Palestinians.

On 30 March 2026, the Knesset passed the Death Penalty for Terrorists Law, a measure that critics and legal experts have characterized as a tool of Jewish supremacism due to its discriminatory design. Legal scholar Mordechai Kremnitzer argued that the law represents a "severing [of] Israel's remaining humanistic and liberal values" and serves the agenda of Jewish extremist organizations by institutionalizing a regime that distinguishes between "Jewish blood and Palestinian blood". The law specifically targets Palestinians through two mechanisms: it applies to military courts in the West Bank, where only Palestinians are tried, and it amends the Penal Code to define capital offenses as those intended to negate the existence of the State of Israel, a criterion critics say is tailored to exclude Jewish Israelis who commit nationalistic murders. The law has been called a move toward "unbridled extremism" that seeks to codify Jewish supremacy into the state's ultimate punitive power.

== See also ==
- Israeli apartheid
- Racism in Jewish communities
  - Racism in Israel
- Zionism as settler colonialism
- Black supremacy
- Christian supremacy
- Supremacism
- White supremacy
