= Temple Mount Administration =

Israeli far-right activist group

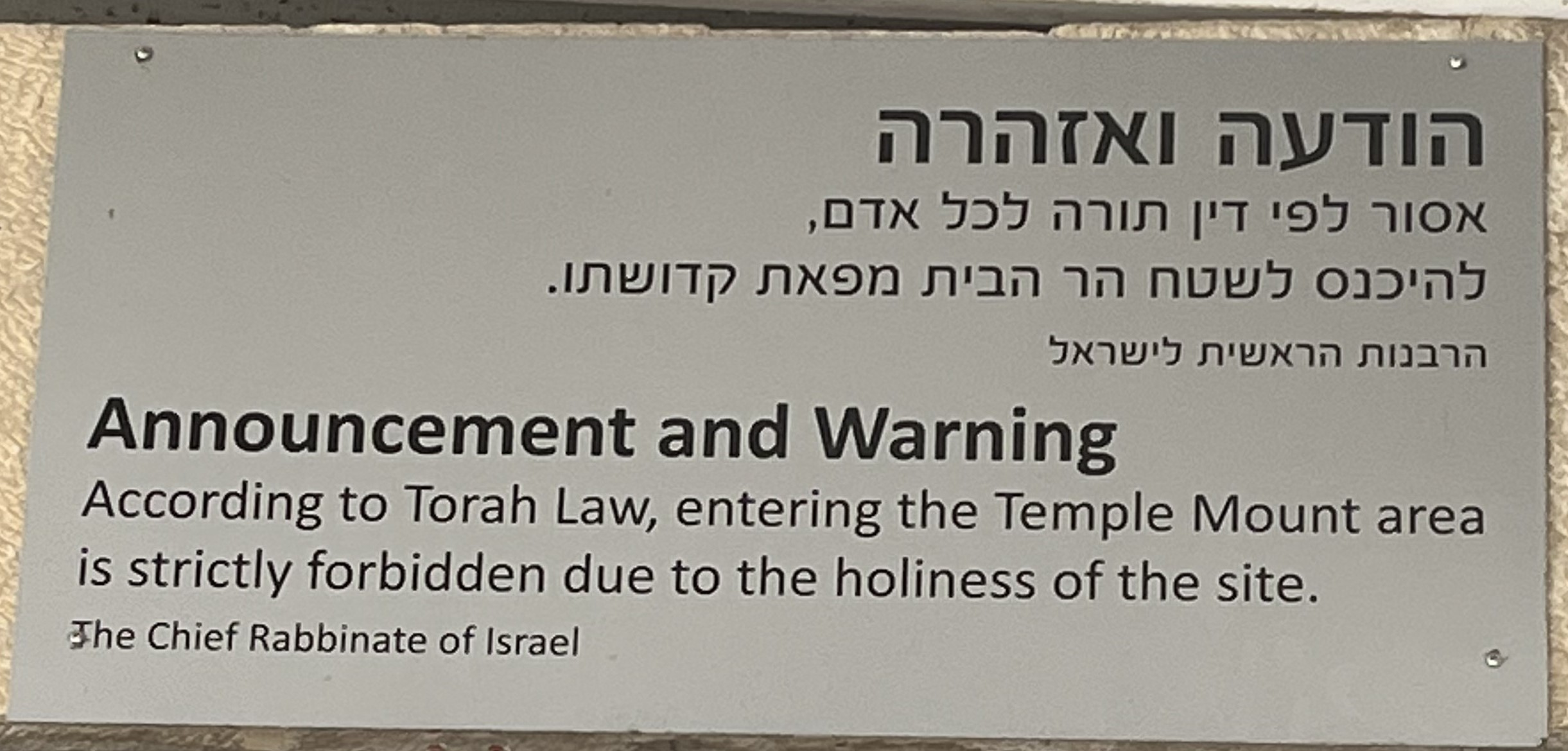
In 2022, the self-proclaimed "Temple Mount Administration" activist group removed the sign by the Chief Rabbinate of Israel warning against entering the Temple Mount. The Israeli Police eventually restored the sign to its place.

The self-proclaimed "Temple Mount Administration" (Hebrew: מינהלת הר הבית, Minhelet Har-HaBait) is a far-right activist group led by Israeli rabbi Shimshon Elboin whose aim is to change the centuries-old "status quo" that provides that Jews can pray at the Western Wall and can visit – but not pray at – the Temple Mount, the site of the Al-Aqsa Mosque compound, in East Jerusalem's Old City. In spite of its name, the group does not administer nor hold any powers over the Temple Mount, whose administration is the responsibility of the Jordanian-appointed Jerusalem Waqf, whereas the Israeli Police controls access to the site.

The activist group's final objective is the construction of the Jewish Third Temple over the place where the Islamic Dome of the Rock now stands.

Ayala Nimrodi, the wife of the leader of far-right party Otzma Yehudit ("Jewish Power") Itamar Ben-Gvir, is also an active member of the group.

The group also defends the performing of Passover sacrifices, with the ritual slaughter of animals, by Jews at the Temple Mount.

In 2023, press reports informed that the traditional sign from the Chief Rabbinate of Israel warning Jewish visitors against entering the Temple Mount had been removed – the sign stated that “According to Torah law, it is forbidden for any person to enter the Temple Mount because of its holiness” –, and that the "Temple Mount Administration" activist group had put in its place new signs with instructions for Jews to enter the Temple Mount. The Israeli Police eventually removed the new signs and reinstated the Chief Rabbinate's sign to its place.

== See also ==
- Jewish fundamentalism
