= Yoel Schwartz =

Israeli rabbi (1939–2022)

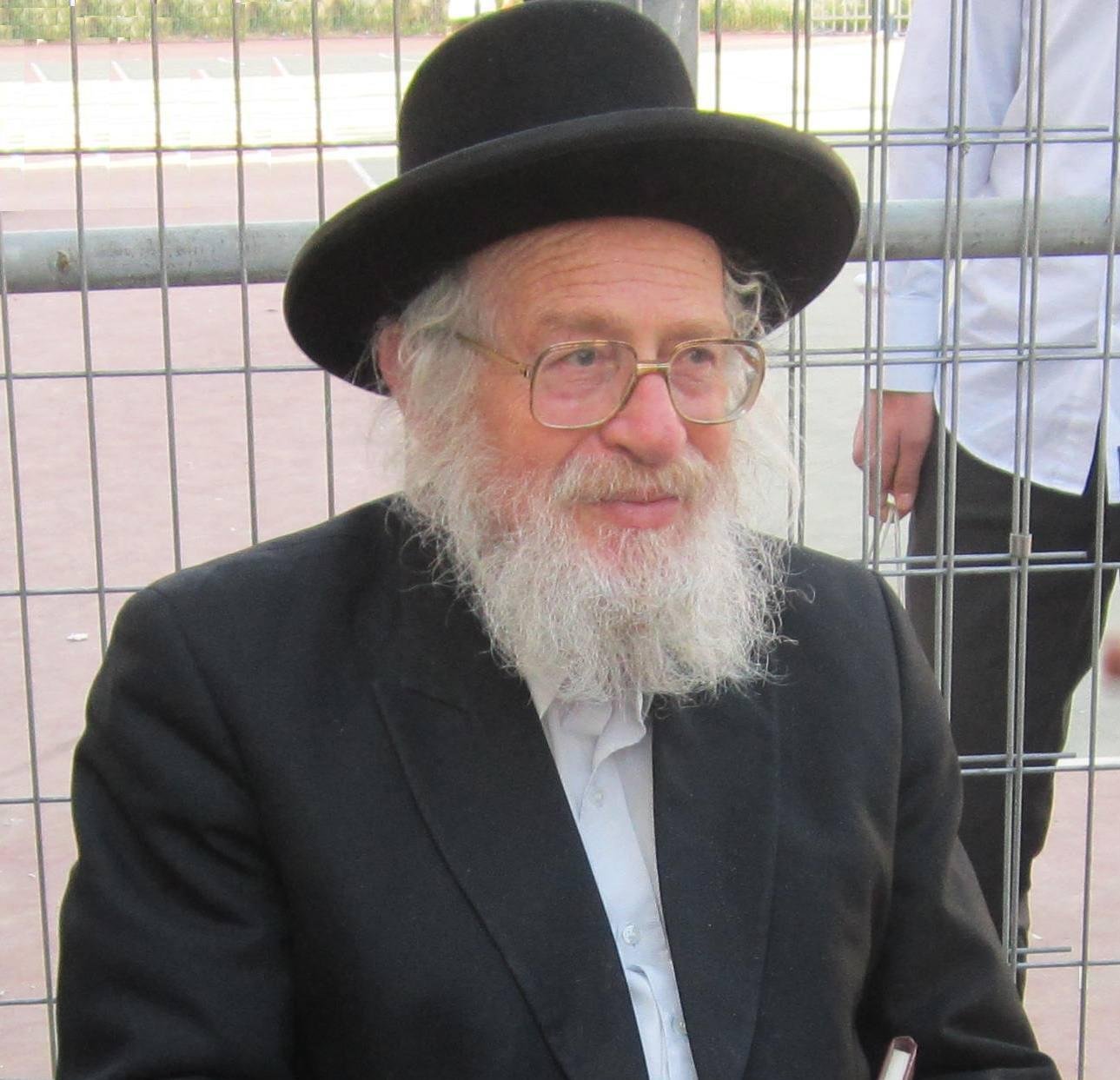

Yoel Schwartz (Hebrew: יואל שוורץ; 29 September 1939 – 8 September 2022) was an Israeli Haredi Jewish rabbi, Torah scholar, and writer who published over 200 Jewish books. He was a senior lecturer at Dvar Yerushalayim yeshiva in the Jerusalem neighborhood of Har Nof, an English-speaking institute for baalei teshuva. He was also involved in attempts to revive the Sanhedrin.

== Education ==
Schwartz studied at Kol Torah Yeshiva in Jerusalem, Ponevezh Yeshiva in Bnei Brak and Mir Yeshiva in Jerusalem. He served as the mashgiach ruchani of Yeshivas Itri.

== Prizes ==
In 2009, he received the Moskowitz Prize for Zionism in Jerusalem for his work in establishing the "Nahal Haredi" framework to allow for Haredi conscription and service in the IDF.

== See also ==
- Modern attempts to revive the Sanhedrin
