= Rabbi Hilkiah =

Sage of the Talmud

Rabbi Hilkiah (Hebrew: רבי חלקיה) was an Amora of the Land of Israel of the fourth generation of the Amoraic era. He was an Aggadist and his teachings mostly dealt with this issue.

R. Hilkiah is mentioned dozens of times in the Jerusalem Talmud and the Midrash Aggadah, and once in the Babylonian Talmud. He was the pupil of R. Pinchas and a colleague of R. Shimon ben Pazi. The Midrash mentions a sage called Isaac ben Rabbi Hilkiah, who may very well be his son.
