= Yisrael Ariel =

Israeli rabbi (born 1939)

Yisrael Ariel ישראל אריאל
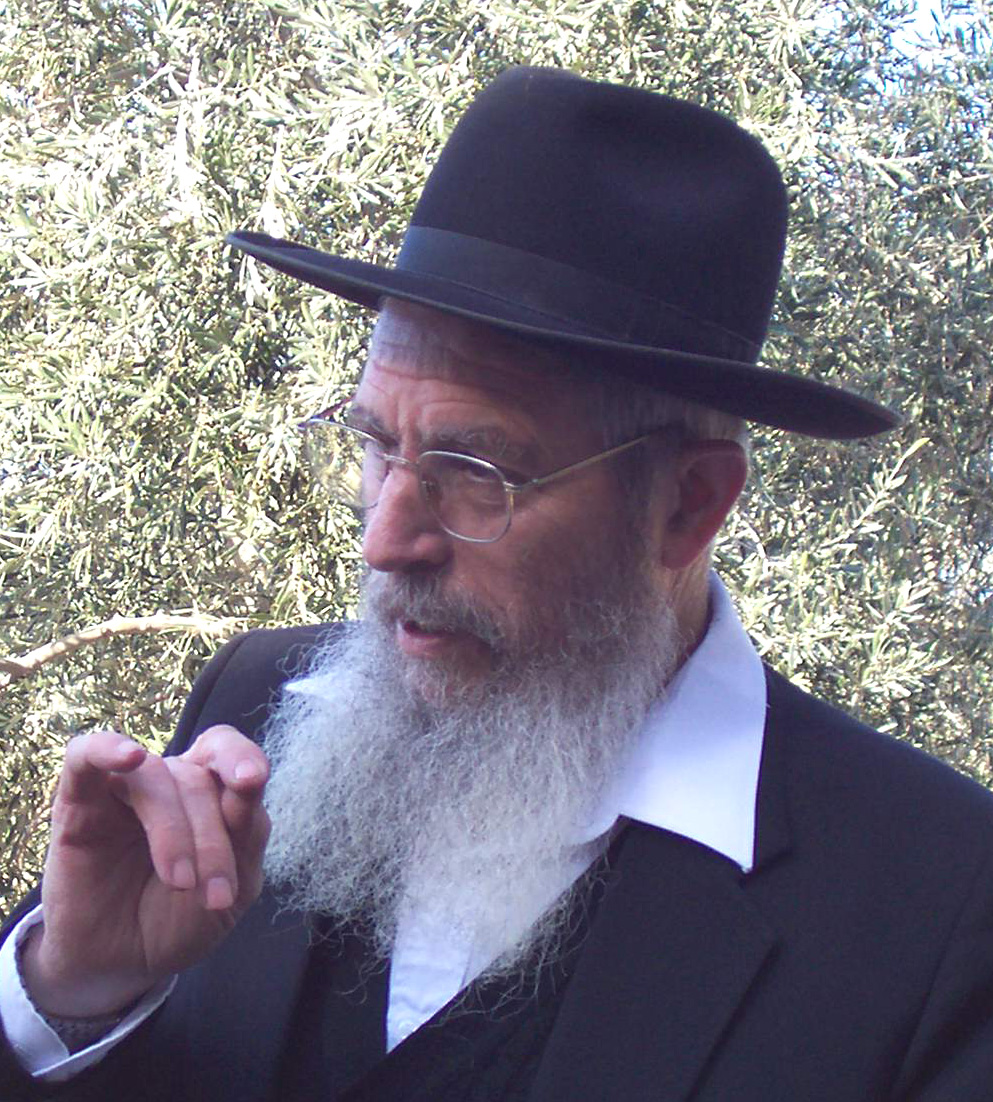

Personal life
- Born: Yisrael Stieglitz; August 15, 1939 (age 86) Kiryat Motzkin, Mandatory Palestine
- Parent(s): Moshe and Esther Stieglitz
- Dynasty: Ruzhin

Religious life
- Religion: Judaism

Jewish leader
- Synagogue: Yamit
- Organisation: The Temple Institute
- Other: Founder of The Temple Institute; Chief Rabbi of Yamit, 1982–
- Dynasty: Ruzhin

Rabbi Yisrael Ariel (Hebrew: ישראל אריאל; born Yisrael Stieglitz 15 August 1939) was the chief rabbi of the evacuated Israeli settlement of Yamit in the Sinai Peninsula during the years when the Sinai was controlled by Israel, and the founder of the Temple Institute (Machon HaMikdash). His brother, Rabbi Yaakov Ariel, served as the rosh yeshiva in the yeshiva in Yamit and later became the chief rabbi of Ramat Gan.

== Biography ==
Ariel is a graduate of the Mercaz HaRav Yeshiva. As a young man, Ariel served in the Paratroopers Brigade unit that captured the Temple Mount in the Six-Day War.

For the 1981 Knesset elections, Ariel ran as number two on the Kach list, with Rabbi Meir Kahane in the number-one spot. His involvement predates the party's split after the death of party leader Rabbi Kahane in 1990 (who was assassinated by Egyptian El Sayyid Nosair), and the party's later designation as a terrorist Jewish group by the United States and Israel in 2001.

As of 2006, aside from being the head of the Temple Institute, he is also involved in an attempt to revive the Sanhedrin.

In December 2006, he was briefly arrested and interrogated by Israeli police after confronting General Elazar Stern.

== Views ==
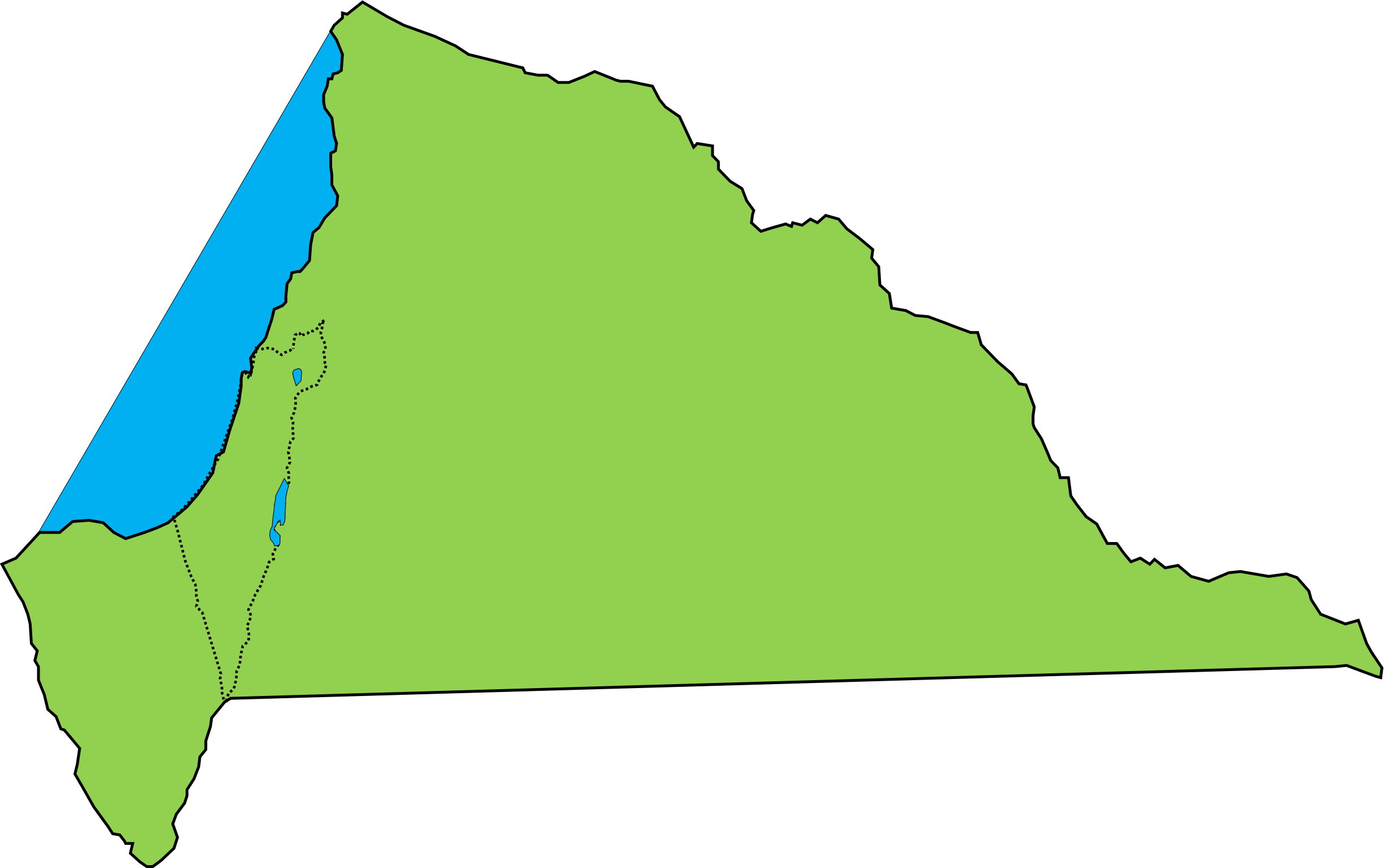
The borders of the Land of Israel according to the method of Rabbi Yisrael Ariel, which is presented in the six volumes of his work "Otzar Eretz Yisrael" (A Treasury of the Land of Israel)

In 2015, he described Jewish religious terrorism suspects who were banned from entering the West Bank due to vandalism, as praiseworthy.

He also criticized gay people who walked on the Temple Mount, and suggested that some earthquakes were divine retribution from God as a result of gay people walking on the mount.

He called for the conquest of Lebanon. He believes that killing an Arab is not a murder, and called for the expulsion of non-Jews from Eretz Yisrael (Land of Israel).

== See also ==
- Modern attempts to revive the Sanhedrin
