= Moshe Halberstam =

Son of Grand Rabbi Yaakov Halberstam of Tschakava

Rabbi Moshe Halberstam (Hebrew: משה הלברשטאם; April 1, 1932 – April 26, 2006) was the son of Grand Rabbi Yaakov Halberstam of Tschakava, a scion of the Sanz dynasty, and of the daughter of Rabbi Sholom Moskowitz of Shotz of London.

He was the Rosh Yeshivah of the Tschakava Yeshivah in Jerusalem and one of the most prominent members of the Edah Charedis Rabbinical court of Jerusalem. He was known as a well-versed Torah scholar and a decisor of Halachic law. He wrote approbations to many works of Torah literature.

Rabbi Halberstam served at the President of Hatzolah Israel. He was also the Rabbi of the Shaarei Tzedek Hospital in Jerusalem. He was known for his tolerance towards other streams of thought in Orthodox Judaism. Despite his own Chareidi anti-Zionist background, he also maintained contacts with Modern Orthodox, Religious Zionist leaders.

He was buried in the Mount of Olives cemetery in Jerusalem.
