= Third Temple =

Hypothetical rebuilt Jewish holy temple in Jerusalem

The "Third Temple" (Hebrew: בֵּית הַמִּקְדָּשׁ הַשְּׁלִישִׁי, Bēṯ hamMīqdāš hašŠlīšī, transl. 'Third House of the Sanctum') refers to hypothetical rebuilt Temple in Jerusalem. It would succeed the First Temple (destroyed during the Babylonian siege in c. 587 BCE) and the Second Temple (destroyed during the Roman siege in 70 CE). While the specific phrase does not appear in the Hebrew Bible, prophetic literature forms the textual foundation for later Jewish messianic expectations; most notably the vision of a transformed sanctuary in the Book of Ezekiel. In traditional Jewish theology, the sanctuary is fundamentally contingent on the arrival of the Messiah, being built or divinely revealed only once the Messianic era is underway; rabbinic authorities diverge on whether the Messiah will direct its physical construction or if the structure will descend directly from heaven. Modern denominations view the concept differently: while Orthodox liturgy anticipates this messianic restoration, Reform and Conservative streams have largely reinterpreted or discontinued prayers for a restored sacrificial cult. The prospective building of the Temple also plays a major role in certain dispensationalist interpretations of Christian eschatology, where a restored physical sanctuary is viewed as an essential setting for end-times events. In contrast, historical and mainstream Christian traditions—including Catholicism, Eastern Orthodoxy, and most Protestant denominations—do not anticipate a third physical temple, interpreting biblical temple imagery as typologically fulfilled in Jesus Christ and the Christian community.

Among some groups of devout Jews, anticipation of a future project to build the Third Temple at the Temple Mount in the Old City of Jerusalem has been espoused as an ideological motive in Israel. However, the initiative faces significant theological opposition within mainstream Orthodox Judaism, where a broad rabbinic consensus holds that the Temple can only be established after the arrival of the Messiah, that is, whether through messianic direction or by descending fully formed from heaven, and forbids human attempts to build it prematurely. In addition, halakhic restrictions concerning ritual purity (tumah and taharah) prohibit Jews from setting foot on the sanctified areas of the site until the ritual ashes of a red heifer are restored.

The building of the Third Temple has also been contested by Muslims and the international community at large, as the esplanade—known in Islam as Haram al-Sharif—is the site of the Al-Aqsa Mosque and the Dome of the Rock, constituting the third-holiest site in Islam. Because any physical construction would alter or compromise these centuries-old Islamic sanctuaries, advocacy for the Third Temple remains one of the primary religious and political flashpoints of the Israeli–Palestinian conflict. The project also faces unresolved internal halakhic disputes within Orthodox Judaism regarding divine intervention, as well as archaeological debate over the sanctuary's exact historical footprint. Most of the international community has refrained from recognizing any sovereignty over Jerusalem due to conflicting territorial claims between Israel and the State of Palestine, as both sides have asserted it as their capital city.

== Attempts at rebuilding ==
Since the destruction of the Second Temple in 70 CE by the Romans, some Jews have expressed their desire to build a Third Temple on the Temple Mount, with a formal petition for a rebuilt Temple included in the Conservative and Orthodox Amidah. Although it remains unbuilt, the notion of and desire for a Third Temple has traditionally been an integral principle in Judaism.

Following the Second Temple's destruction, "most rabbis adopted the position that Jewish law prohibits reconstructing the Holy Temple [Third Temple] prior to the age of messianic redemption, or that the law is too ambiguous and that the messiah must come first."

=== Bar Kokhba revolt ===
In the early 2nd century CE, Roman Emperor Hadrian granted permission to rebuild the destroyed Second Temple—probably as a means to pacify the Jews after the wider Diaspora Revolt and the specifically Judaean Kitos War—but changed his mind. There used to be a minority of scholars claiming that the forces of Simon bar Kokhba captured Jerusalem from the Romans in 132 and held it for about three years, but there is little mainstream support for the concept. The dwindling hope for regaining Jerusalem led to the writing of the Mishna, as the religious leaders believed that the next attempt to rebuild the temple might be centuries away, and memory of the practices and ceremonies must be documented, otherwise they would be lost. Following the suppression of the revolt, the Roman authorities killed, enslaved, and displaced large portions of the Judaean Jewish population. Emperor Hadrian rebuilt Jerusalem as a Roman pagan colony named Aelia Capitolina, barred Jews from residing there, and merged the territory into the province of Syria Palaestina; Jews were prohibited from accessing the city except on the day of Tisha B'Av. Some Rabbis who survived the Roman persecution were allowed to continue their Talmudic academies in Syria Palaestina as long as they paid the Fiscus Judaicus tax.

=== Julian ===
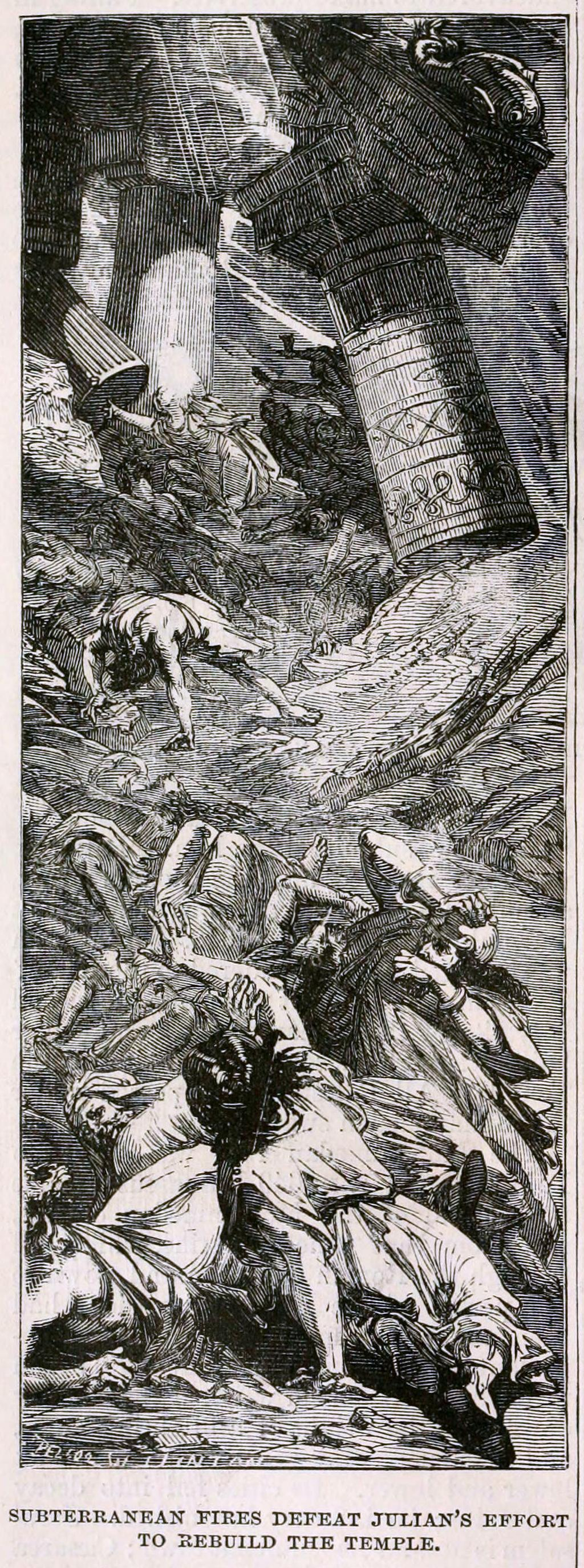
Subterranean fires defeat Julian's effort to rebuild the temple, illustration by James Dabney, 1877

There was an aborted project under Roman emperor Julian (361–363 CE) to rebuild the Temple. Julian is traditionally called Julian the Apostate because he rejected the Christian faith in which he had been brought up. Once emperor his policy was to seek to revive the traditional religion by enabling traditional religious practices and restoring holy places across the Empire. As part of this policy, Julian permitted the Jews to begin building a Third Temple. Rabbi Hilkiyah, one of the leading rabbis of the time, spurned Julian's money, arguing that gentiles should play no part in the rebuilding of the temple.

According to later ancient sources, including Sozomen (c. 400–450 CE) in his Historia Ecclesiastica and the pagan historian and close friend of Julian, Ammianus Marcellinus, the project of rebuilding the temple was aborted because each time the workers tried to build the temple using the existing substructure, they were burned by terrible flames coming from inside the earth and an earthquake destroyed what work was done:

Julian thought to rebuild at an extravagant expense the proud Temple once at Jerusalem, and committed this task to Alypius of Antioch. Alypius set vigorously to work, and was seconded by the governor of the province; when fearful balls of fire, breaking out near the foundations, continued their attacks, till the workmen, after repeated scorchings, could approach no more: and he gave up the attempt.

— Ammianus Marcellinus, The Roman History of Ammianus Marcellinus, Book 23, Chapter 1, Line 3

The failure to rebuild the Temple has been ascribed to the Galilee earthquake of 363 CE, and to the Jews' own ambivalence about the project. Sabotage is a possibility, as is an accidental fire. Divine intervention was the common view among Christian historians of the time. When Julian was killed in battle after a reign of less than three years, the Christians reasserted control over the empire, and the opportunity to rebuild the Temple ended.

=== Sassanid vassal state ===
In 610 CE, the Sassanid Empire drove the Byzantine Empire out of the Middle East, giving the Jews control of Jerusalem for the first time in centuries. The new rulers soon ordered the restart of animal sacrifice for the first time since the time of Bar Kochba. Shortly before the Byzantines took the area back, the Persians gave control to the Christian population, who tore down the partly built edifice, and turned it into a garbage dump, which is what it was when the Caliph Omar took the city in the 630s.

=== Muslim conquest of Syria ===
An Armenian chronicle from the 7th century CE, written by the bishop Sebeos, states that the Jews and Arabs were quarreling amongst each other about their differences of religion during the Siege of Jerusalem in 637 CE but "a man of the sons of Ishmael named Muhammad" gave a "sermon of the Way of Truth, supposedly at God's command" to them saying that they, both the Jews and the Arabs, should unite under the banner of their father Abraham and enter the Holy Land. Sebeos also reports that the Jews began a reconstruction of the temple, but the Arabs expelled them and re-purposed the place for their own prayers. In turn, these Jews built another temple in a different location.

=== During the Mongol raids into Syria ===
In 1267, during the Mongol raids into Syria, an interregnum period between the complete domination of the Levant by the crusader states until 1260 and the conquest of Levant by the Mamluks in 1291, Nachmanides wrote a letter to his son. It contained the following references to the land and the Temple:

What shall I say of this land ... The more holy the place the greater the desolation. Jerusalem is the most desolate of all ... There are about 2,000 inhabitants ... but there are no Jews, for after the arrival of the Tartars, the Jews fled, and some were killed by the sword. There are now only two brothers, dyers, who buy their dyes from the government. At their place a quorum of worshippers meets on the Sabbath, and we encourage them, and found a ruined house, built on pillars, with a beautiful dome, and made it into a synagogue ... People regularly come to Jerusalem, men and women from Damascus and from Aleppo and from all parts of the country, to see the Temple and weep over it. And may He who deemed us worthy to see Jerusalem in her ruins, grant us to see her rebuilt and restored, and the honor of the Divine Presence returned.

=== Modern rebuilding efforts ===
In mainstream Orthodox Judaism, the rebuilding of the Temple is generally left to the coming of the Jewish Messiah and to divine providence. A few organizations, representing a small minority of Orthodox Jews, want to realize the construction of a Third Temple in present times. The Temple Institute, the self-proclaimed "Temple Mount Administration" and the Temple Mount and Eretz Yisrael Faithful Movement each state that its goal is to build the Third Temple on the Temple Mount (Mount Moriah).

=== Attempts to re-establish a Jewish presence on the Temple Mount ===
In August 1967, after the Israeli capture of the Mount, Rabbi Shlomo Goren (deceased 1994) the former Chief Rabbi of the Israel Defense Forces (IDF) (and later chief rabbi of the State of Israel), began organizing public prayer for Jews on the Temple Mount. Rabbi Goren was known for his controversial positions concerning Jewish sovereignty over the Temple Mount. On August 15, 1967, shortly after the Six-Day War, Goren led a group of fifty Jews onto the Temple Mount, where, fighting off protesting Muslim guards and Israeli police, they held a prayer service. Goren continued to pray for many years in the Makhkame building overlooking the Temple Mount, where he conducted yearly High Holy Days services. His call for the establishment of a synagogue on the Temple Mount was reiterated by his brother-in-law, the former Chief Rabbi of Haifa, She'ar Yashuv Cohen (deceased 2016).

Goren was sharply criticized by the Israeli Defense Ministry, who, noting Goren's senior rank, called his behaviour inappropriate. The episode led the Chief Rabbis of the time to restate the accepted laws of Judaism that no Jews were allowed on the mount due to issues of ritual impurity. The secular authorities welcomed this ruling as it preserved the status quo with the Jerusalem Islamic Waqf. Disagreeing with his colleagues, Goren maintained that Jews were not only permitted, but commanded, to ascend and pray on the mount.

Goren advocated building a Third Temple on the Temple Mount from the 1960s onward. In the summer of 1983, Goren and several other rabbis joined Rabbi Yehuda Getz (deceased 1995), who worked for the Religious Affairs Ministry at the Western Wall, in touring a chamber underneath the mount that Getz had excavated. The tunnel was shortly discovered and resulted in a massive brawl between young Jews and Arabs in the area. The tunnel was quickly sealed with concrete by Israeli police. The sealed entrance can be seen from the Western Wall Tunnel, which opened to the public in 1996.

The Chief Rabbis of Israel, Isser Yehuda Unterman and Yitzhak Nissim, together with other leading rabbis, asserted that "For generations we have warned against and refrained from entering any part of the Temple Mount." A recent study of this rabbinical ruling suggests that it was both "unprecedented" and possibly prompted by governmental pressure on the rabbis, and "brilliant" in preventing Muslim–Jewish friction on the Mount. Rabbinical consensus in the Religious Zionist stream of Orthodox Judaism continues to hold that it is forbidden for Jews to enter any part of the Temple Mount and in January 2005, a declaration was signed confirming the 1967 decision. On the eve of Shavuot in 2014, or 6th Sivan, 5774 in the Hebrew calendar, 400 Jews ascended the Temple Mount; some were photographed in prayer.

==== Status of Temple Mount ====
Many rabbis interpret halakha (Jewish religious law) as prohibiting Jews from entering the Holy of Holies. The situation is complicated as the Dome of the Rock and Al-Aqsa Mosque fall under control of Muslim clerics, but Israeli police administer its security. According to CNN:

In 1996, the Israeli government opened an archeological tunnel just outside the compound, sparking riots in which 80 people, most of them Palestinians, were killed.

A 2000 visit to the Temple Mount by Ariel Sharon resulted in a clash between "stone-throwing Palestinians and Israeli troops, who fired tear gas and rubber bullets into the crowd," coinciding with the beginning of the Second Intifada which ended in 2005.

During the Sukkot festival in 2006, National Union Knesset member Uri Ariel visited the Temple Mount without incident, and the Israeli police witnessed no provocation by the protestors.

While Israeli authorities historically enforced strict prohibitions against non-Muslim prayer to maintain order, visits by right-wing Israeli politicians and organized Jewish activist groups increased significantly in the 2010s and 2020s. Over time, police enforcement transitioned from detaining worshippers to escorting groups engaging in prayer, leading to recurring diplomatic protests from Jordan, Palestinian leaders, and the Waqf over the progressive erosion of the Status Quo.

=== Archaeological footprint and location debate ===
While the site of the Dome of the Rock is widely regarded as the place where the Second Temple once stood, several alternative hypotheses have been proposed. Some researchers have suggested alternative positions on the Mount, including locations directly north of the Dome of the Rock, in the open plaza between the Dome and the Al-Aqsa Mosque, or further south on the Ophel and the City of David to allow direct access to the Gihon Spring.

== Controversies ==
=== Critiques of settler colonialism and cultural erasure ===
Scholars of settler colonialism, Palestinian historians, and human rights organisations argue that modern advocacy for a Third Temple functions as an ideological vehicle for Israeli territorial expansion and demographic re-engineering in East Jerusalem. Analysts cite the June 1967 demolition of the 770-year-old Moroccan Quarter, in which Israeli forces razed an entire residential and religious district and displaced hundreds of Palestinian residents to construct the Western Wall plaza, as a foundational precedent demonstrating how projects around the esplanade entail physical erasure and population displacement.

=== State funding and institutional alignment ===
Although Temple activism historically originated on the religious fringe, multiple Israeli state institutions have incorporated and financially subsidized its initiatives:

- Direct subsidies: Between 2008 and 2011, the Ministry of Education and the Ministry of Culture and Sport transferred an annual average of NIS 412,000 in public subsidies to the Temple Institute. In 2024, the Ministry of Heritage budgeted NIS 2 million ($543,000) for state-sponsored guided tours of the Temple Mount promoting Jewish heritage narratives.
- Civilian service labor: The Israeli government permits women completing civilian national service (Sherut Leumi) in lieu of mandatory military service to serve as tour guides and educational staff for the Temple Institute.
- Executive oversight and police enforcement: Figures aligned with the Temple movement have assumed executive ministerial portfolios over law enforcement at the holy sites. National Security Minister Itamar Ben-Gvir, who oversees the Israel Police, has repeatedly ascended the esplanade, declared an end to the prohibition against Jewish prayer, and publicly advocated for building a synagogue within the compound. Concurrently, police practice on the Mount shifted from detaining non-Muslim visitors seen worshipping to actively protecting organized Jewish prayer and prostration, directly eroding the historic Status Quo.
- Military symbolism and wartime controversies: The adoption of Third Temple iconography by members of the Israel Defense Forces (IDF) has also generated controversy. In May 2024, during the Israel–Hamas war, Israeli soldiers operating in the Gaza Strip were filmed raising numerous flags calling for the construction of the Third Temple on their heavy machinery, bulldozers and other engineering vehicles. hile the IDF spokesperson stated that the incident violated military protocol and would be investigated, no disciplinary findings or measures were subsequently made public.

=== International law and cultural heritage status ===
Under international law and consensus, which is reflected across numerous United Nations Security Council and General Assembly resolutions, East Jerusalem is classified as occupied territory subject to the Fourth Geneva Convention. Article 49 of the convention and the Hague Convention for the Protection of Cultural Property in the Event of Armed Conflict prohibit an occupying power from altering the legal, demographic, or cultural character of occupied land or undertaking unauthorized interventions in cultural property.

The Old City of Jerusalem and its Walls was placed on the UNESCO List of World Heritage in Danger in 1982. The World Heritage Committee has repeatedly censured Israeli archaeological excavations, tunneling, and structural works around the Haram al-Sharif / Temple Mount esplanade, calling for the protection of its authentic Islamic cultural integrity. Consequently, the Jerusalem Islamic Waqf, regional governments, and international legal authorities view any attempt to construct Jewish ritual structures on the esplanade as a violation of international conventions safeguarding the historic basin.

=== Theological opposition to unilateral reconstruction ===
Within Orthodox Judaism, mainstream rabbinic authorities oppose contemporary efforts to construct a Third Temple, maintaining that reconstruction is strictly tied to the messianic era and divine intervention rather than human initiative.

In rabbinic tradition, the absence of prophetic revelation poses a decisive halakhic barrier; the Talmud recounts that the reconstruction of the Second Temple required the direct guidance of the biblical prophets Haggai, Zechariah, and Malachi. Further halakhic uncertainties regarding the precise original layout—including the biblical dimensions of the cubit and the exact placement of the altar—lead traditional authorities to view any physical construction attempts as unauthorized. Consequently, major rabbinic bodies, including the Chief Rabbinate of Israel, prohibit entry onto the esplanade and reject activist attempts to pre-empt messianic fulfillment.

== Jewish views ==
=== Orthodox Judaism ===
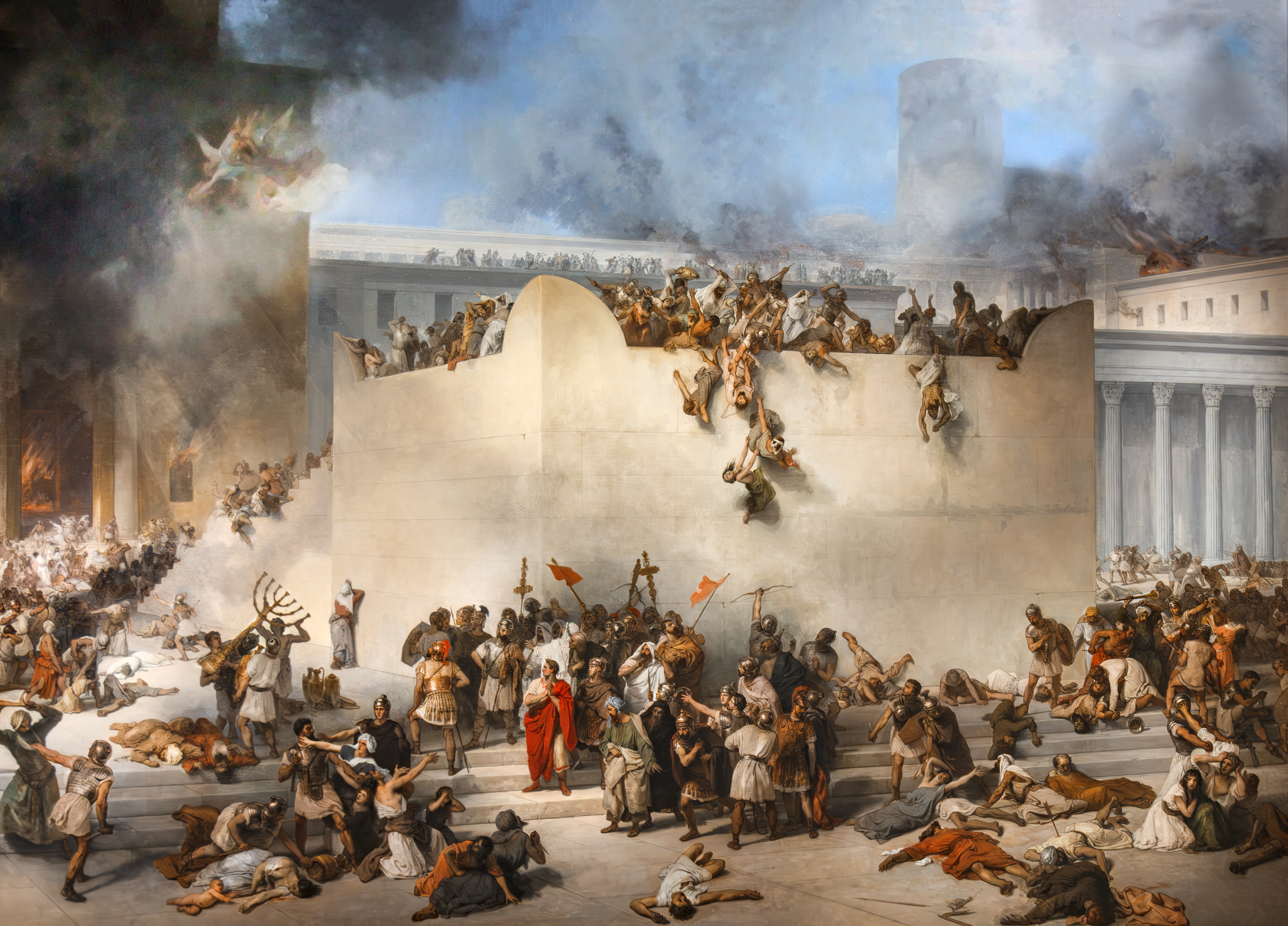
The Destruction of the Temple of Jerusalem by Francesco Hayez, 1867

Orthodox Judaism believes in the rebuilding of a Third Temple and the resumption of korban (sacrifices), although there is disagreement about how rebuilding should take place. Orthodox scholars and rabbinic authorities generally believe that rebuilding should occur in the era of the Jewish messiah at the hand of divine providence, although a minority position, following the opinion of Maimonides, holds that Jews should endeavour to rebuild the temple themselves, whenever possible.

A notable early proponent of active human effort was 19th-century Orthodox rabbi Zvi Hirsch Kalischer. In his 1862 work Derishat Zion, Kalischer argued that messianic redemption and the reinstitution of sacrificial services on the Temple Mount would not occur passively through miraculous intervention, but required preliminary human action. Rather than advocating military conquest, he explicitly proposed raising collective funds from diaspora Jewish communities to purchase and cultivate land peacefully, establishing an agricultural foundation and local security guards alongside his religious goals.

The generally accepted position among Orthodox Jews is that the full order of the sacrifices will be resumed upon the building of the Temple. This belief is embedded in Orthodox Jewish prayer services. Three times a day, Orthodox Jews recite the Amidah, which contains prayers for the Temple's restoration and for the resumption of sacrifices, and every day there is a recitation of the order of the day's sacrifices and the psalms the Levites would have sung that day. Conservative, Reform, and Reconstructionist authorities disavow all belief in the resumption of korban.

Maimonides wrote in The Guide for the Perplexed "that God deliberately has moved Jews away from sacrifices towards prayer, as prayer is a higher form of worship". However, in his Jewish legal code, the Mishneh Torah, he states that animal sacrifices will resume in the Third Temple, and details how they will be carried out. Some attribute to Rabbi Abraham Isaac Kook the view that animal sacrifices will not be reinstituted. These views on the Temple service are sometimes misconstrued (for example, in Olat Raiyah, commenting on the prophecy of Malachi ("Then the grain-offering of Judah and Jerusalem will be pleasing to God as in the days of old and as in former years" [Malachi 3:4]), Kook indicates that only grain offerings will be offered in the reinstated Temple service, while in a related essay from Igrot HaRaiyah he suggests otherwise.

=== Conservative Judaism ===
Conservative Judaism holds a belief in a messiah and the rebuilding of the Temple, but it does not support the restoration of korbanot (cult sacrifices). Accordingly, Conservative Judaism's Committee on Jewish Law and Standards has modified the prayer book to reflect the movement's theology. Conservative prayer books call for the restoration of the Temple, but do not ask for the resumption of sacrifices. The daily Orthodox Torah study portion on Temple sacrifices during Shacharit was replaced with Talmudic passages teaching that deeds of loving-kindness now atone for sin.

In the Amidah, the central prayer in Jewish services, petitions to accept the "fire offerings of Israel" and "the grain-offering of Judah and Jerusalem" (Malachi 3:4) are substituted. In the special Mussaf Amidah prayer said on Shabbat and Jewish holidays, the Hebrew phrase na'ase ve'nakriv (we will present and sacrifice) is modified to read to asu ve'hikrivu (they presented and sacrificed), implying that cult sacrifices were necessary in the Jewish past, not in contemporary or future Judaism. The prayer for the restoration of "the House of our lives" and for the Shekhinah to dwell "among us" in the weekday Torah reading is retained in Conservative prayer books, although not all Conservative congregations or individuals recite it. In Conservative prayer books, words and phrases with dual meaning, referring to both Temple features and theological or poetic concepts, are generally retained. Translations and commentaries, however, generally refer to the poetic or theological meanings only. Conservative Judaism also takes an intermediate position on Kohanim and Levites, preserving patrilineal tribal descent and some aspects of their roles, but lifting restrictions on whom Kohanim are permitted to marry.

In 2006, the Committee on Jewish Law and Standards addressed the role of niddah, related to a woman's menstruation, in Conservative Judaism, considering it in the context of ritual purity concepts from the Temple in contemporary Judaism. One responsum adopted by a majority of the Committee held that concepts of ritual purity relevant to entry into the Temple are no longer applicable to contemporary Judaism and accepted a proposal to change the term "family purity" to "family holiness" and to explain the continuing observance of niddah on a different basis from continuity with Temple practices. Another responsum, also adopted by a majority of the Committee, called for retaining existing observances, terminology, and rationale, and held that these Temple-related observances and concepts continued to have contemporary impact and meaning. Thus, consistent with Conservative Judaism's philosophy of pluralism, both views of the continuing relevance of Temple-related concepts of ritual purity are permissible Conservative views.

Theodor Herzl includes the reconstructed Temple in his novel Altneuland along with an intact Dome of the Rock.

=== Reform Judaism ===
Reform Judaism does not believe in rebuilding a central Temple or restoring Temple sacrifices or worship. It regards the Temple and sacrificial era as a period of a more primitive form of ritual from which Judaism has evolved and should not return. It also believes a special role for Kohanim and Levites represents a caste system incompatible with modern principles of egalitarianism, and does not preserve these roles. Furthermore, there is a Reform view that the shul or synagogue is a modern Temple; hence, "Temple" appears in numerous congregation names in Reform Judaism. Indeed, the re-designation of the synagogue as "temple" was one of the hallmarks of early Reform in 19th-century Germany, when Berlin was declared the new Jerusalem, and Reform Jewry sought to demonstrate their staunch German nationalism. The Anti-Zionism that characterized Reform Judaism throughout much of its history subsided significantly following the Holocaust and the subsequent establishment and later successes of the modern state of Israel. The belief in the return of the Jews to the Temple in Jerusalem is not part of mainstream Reform Judaism, however.

=== Religious Zionist views ===
While the Chief Rabbinate of Israel maintains its traditional halakhic prohibition against Jews entering the Temple Mount due to concerns over ritual purity, attitudes within Religious Zionism have become increasingly divided. Since the early 2000s, a growing number of Religious Zionist rabbis and educational institutions (yeshivot) has endorsed visits to the esplanade, shifting activist priorities from immediate physical temple construction toward asserting regular Jewish access, prayer, and ritual presence. Sociological studies indicate that these messianic and nationalist currents have cultivated significant public support in Israel for altering the site's status, accompanied by heightened religious polarization between Jewish and Muslim communities.

This religious activism directly conflicts with the historic Status Quo arrangements, which prohibit non-Muslim worship on the esplanade. While the Supreme Court of Israel has affirmed the theoretical freedom of worship, it had – in the past – consistently upheld the authority of the Israel Police to restrict non-Muslim prayer to maintain public order and security. However, now, the police is misusing its power to restrict access on security grounds, intimidate Muslims, and protect Jewish rallies. Originally, the restrictions were designed to maintain the Status Quo, which Israel is obligated to uphold as a consequence of East Jerusalem's established legal status as occupied territory under the Fourth Geneva Convention, affirmed by the International Court of Justice and international consensus. In contrast, Israeli authorities have relied on fringe legal theories, notably the "missing reversioner" argument and claims of self-defense, to contest the applicability of occupation law and treat the territory as disputed. Critics and international legal scholars observe that this legal framing has increasingly been weaponized by right-wing politicians—emboldened by an environment of national and international impunity, such as to legally accept unilateral changes on the ground, dismiss treaty obligations, and erode the historical protections of the holy sites.

The enforcement of prayer restrictions has led to ongoing (2026) domestic political clashes and international diplomatic pushback. Right-wing politicians, notably National Security Minister Itamar Ben-Gvir, have called for an explicit end to the ban on Jewish prayer, while Prime Minister Benjamin Netanyahu has periodically insisted that formal Status Quo arrangements remain unchanged. Despite official denials of formal policy change, investigative reporting and international observers have documented an incremental, de facto easing of police restrictions, where police escorts regularly tolerate quiet prayer, prostrations, and collective Jewish rituals. Legal analysts, Palestinian representatives, and regional governments maintain that this systematic non-enforcement constitutes deliberate, state-sanctioned impunity. Realising that by actively shielding prohibited Jewish worship while maintaining the facade of statutory compliance, Israeli authorities are engineering an illegal, dismantling of the Status Quo in practice while relying on formal statutory policy as legal cover against international reproach.

== Christian views ==
While there is a wide variety of views within Christianity regarding the significance or requirement of a third temple in Jerusalem, according to the writers of the New Testament, the New Covenant—insofar as they interpreted Jeremiah 31:31–34 and Ezekiel 36:26–37 as referring to it—is marked by the indwelling of the Holy Spirit in the Christian believer. Therefore, every Christian's body and gathering thereof comprise "the temple" and, as such, the temple, if not Judaism, has been superseded.

Paul of Tarsus illustrates this belief in his letter to the early Corinthian church (in 1 Corinthians 6:19 of the New Testament):

Or do you not know that your body is a temple of the Holy Spirit who is in you, whom you have from God, and that you are not your own? (1 Corinthians 6:19, NASB)

The author argues that Jesus, having claimed to be and do what the temple was and did, is the new temple, and that, as parts of the "body of Christ" (ie, the Christian church), are his people and parts of a new temple, as well. (That said, Jesus was a contemporary of the Second Temple, as was Paul of Tarsus.) The result, according to N. T. Wright, is that the earthly temple, along with the city of Jerusalem and the Land of Israel, is no longer of any spiritual significance:

[Paul] refers to the church, and indeed to individual Christians, as the 'temple of the living God' (1 Cor. 3:16, 6:19). To Western Christians, thinking anachronistically of the temple as simply the Jewish equivalent of a cathedral, the image is simply one metaphor among many and without much apparent significance. For a first-century Jew, however, the Temple had an enormous significance; as a result, when Paul uses such an image within twenty-five years of the Crucifixion (with the actual temple still standing), it is a striking index of the immense change that has taken place in his [Paul's] thought. The Temple had been superseded by the Church. If this is so for the Temple, and in Romans 4 for the Land, then it must a fortiori be the case for Jerusalem, which formed the concentric circle in between those two in the normal Jewish worldview.

In the teaching of both Jesus and Paul, then, according to Wright,

God's house in Jerusalem was meant to be a 'place of prayer for all the nations' (Isaiah 56:7; Mark 11:17); but God would now achieve this through the new temple, which was Jesus himself and his people.

— T. Wright, 1994

Ben F. Meyer also argued that Jesus applied prophecy regarding Zion and the temple to himself and his followers:

[Jesus] affirmed the prophecies of salvation with their end-time imagery Zion and the temple—belonging to the eschatological themes that the "pilgrimage of the peoples" evoked. But contrary to the common expectation of his contemporaries, Jesus expected the destruction of the temple in the coming eschatological ordeal (Mark 13:2=Matt 24:2=Luke 21:6). The combination seems contradictory. How could he simultaneously predict the ruin of the temple in the ordeal and affirm the end-time fulfilment of promise and prophecy on Zion and [the] temple? The paradox is irresolvable until one takes note of another trait of Jesus' words on the imagery of Zion and temple, namely, the consistent application to his own disciples of Zion- and temple-imagery: the city on the mountain (Matt 5:14; cf. Thomas, 32), the cosmic rock (Matt 16:18; cf. John 1:42), the new sanctuary (Mark 14:58; Matt 26:61). The mass of promise and prophecy will come to fulfilment in this eschatological and messianic circle of believers.

Some would therefore see the need for a third temple as being diminished, redundant, or entirely foreclosed and superseded. In contrast, others take a position that the building of the third temple is an integral part of Christian eschatology. The various perspectives on the significance of the building of a third temple within Christianity are therefore generally linked to a number of factors including: the level of literal or spiritual interpretation applied to what is taken to be "end-time" prophecy; the perceived relationships between various scriptures such as Daniel, the Olivet Discourse, 2 Thessalonians and Ezekiel (amongst others); whether or not a dual-covenant is considered to be in place; and whether Old Testament (Hebrew Biblical) promises of the restoration of Israel remain unfulfilled or have come true given the Messiah was Jesus (2 Corinthians 1:20). Such factors determine, for example, whether Daniel 9:27 or 2 Thessalonians 2:4 are read as referring to a still-future physically restored third temple.

A number of these perspectives are illustrated below.

=== Christian mainstream ===
The dominant view within Roman Catholic, Eastern Orthodox and Protestant Christianity is that animal sacrifices within the Temple were a foreshadowing of the sacrifice Jesus made for the sins of the world through his crucifixion and shedding of his blood on the first day of Passover. The Epistle to the Hebrews is often cited in support of this view: the temple sacrifices are described as being imperfect, since they require repeating (ch. 10:1–4), and as belonging to a covenant that was "becoming obsolete and growing old" and was "ready to vanish away" (ch. 8:13, ESV). Christ's crucifixion, being a sacrifice which dealt with sin once and for all, negated any need for further animal sacrifice. Christ himself is compared to the High Priest who was always standing and performing rituals and sacrifices. Christ, however, having performed his sacrifice, "sat down" – finally attained perfection (ch. 10:11–14,18). Further, the veil or curtain to the Holy of Holies is seen as having been torn asunder at the crucifixion – figuratively in connection with this theology (ch 10:19–21), and literally according to the Gospel of Matthew (ch 27:50–51). Likewise, Revelation 21:22 explicitly describes the absence of a temple in the New Jerusalem, "for its temple is the Lord God almighty and the Lamb." For these reasons, a third temple, whose partial purpose would be the re-institution of animal sacrifices, is seen as unnecessary and thus superseded. Irenaeus and Hippolytus were among early church writers who foresaw a rebuilding of the Temple, as necessary for the preparation for the reign of the Antichrist.

Additionally, Jesus himself stated, in response to a Samaritan asking whether it is right to worship on Mount Gerizim or Mount Zion, that "a time is coming when you will worship the Father neither on this mountain nor in Jerusalem... But in spirit and in truth". He stated of the Herodian temple, "Not one stone will be left on another; every one of them will be thrown down" – John 4:21, Luke 21:6.

==== Roman Catholic and Eastern Orthodox ====
Catholic and Eastern Orthodox Christians believe that the Eucharist, which they hold to be one in substance with the one self-sacrifice of Christ on the Cross, is a far superior offering when compared with the merely preparatory temple sacrifices, as explained in the Epistle to the Hebrews. They also believe that Christ Himself is the New Temple, as spoken of in the Book of Revelation and that Revelation can best be understood as the Eucharist, heaven on earth. Their church buildings are meant to model Solomon's Temple, with the Tabernacle, containing the Eucharist, being considered the new "Holy of Holies." Therefore, they do not attach any significance to a possible future rebuilding of the Jerusalem Temple.

The Orthodox also quote Daniel 9:27 ("... he shall cause the sacrifice and the oblation to cease ...") to show that the sacrifices would stop with the arrival of the Messiah, and mention that according to Jesus, St. Paul and the Holy Fathers, the temple will only be rebuilt in the times of the Antichrist.

Quotations: Matthew 24:15 "When you see the desolating abomination spoken of through Daniel the prophet standing in the holy place (let the reader understand)...."

2 Thessalonians 2:3–4 "Let no one deceive you in any way. For unless the apostasy comes first and the lawless one is revealed,* the one doomed to perdition, who opposes and exalts himself above every so-called god and object of worship, so as to seat himself in the temple of God,* claiming that he is a god – do you not recall that while I was still with you I told you these things?"

==== Protestant ====
In mainstream Protestantism—encompassing Lutheranism, the Reformed and Presbyterian traditions, Anglicanism, and Methodism—the proposal of building a physical Third Temple carries no theological necessity or role in salvation history and is viewed as an initiative that directly endangers the existing Christian and Islamic sanctuaries on the esplanade. Mainstream Protestant hermeneutics relies on biblical typology and covenant theology, interpreting the ancient temple and its Levitical priesthood as provisional shadows fulfilled in the person and work of Jesus. Drawing on the Gospel of John (2:19–21) and the Pauline epistles (1 Corinthians 3:16, Ephesians 2:19–22), these traditions view the body of Christ and the global community of believers—rather than a localized stone structure in Jerusalem—as the true, enduring temple of the Holy Spirit.

Central to this theology is the finality of Christ's atonement as articulated in the Epistle to the Hebrews, which asserts that Jesus offered a single, unrepeatable sacrifice for all time (Hebrews 10:10–14). Consequently, mainline Protestant theologians reject the literal reinstitution of animal sacrifices, viewing any return to an earthly sacrificial altar as a theological regression that diminishes the sufficiency of the cross. Prophetic descriptions of an eschatological sanctuary, such as those in Ezekiel 40–48, are understood metaphorically or realized spiritually, culminating in the New Jerusalem of Revelation 21:22, where no temple exists because "its temple is the Lord God Almighty and the Lamb."

In contemporary practice, mainline Protestant bodies—including member communions of the World Council of Churches and local historic bodies like the Episcopal Diocese of Jerusalem—distance themselves from dispensationalist end-times expectations. Instead, they emphasize peacemaking, interfaith coexistence, and adherence to the historic Status Quo governing the holy sites, warning that modern campaigns to rebuild the Temple pose a grave threat to regional peace and the existing Christian and Islamic sanctuaries.

=== Dispensationalist Christian ===
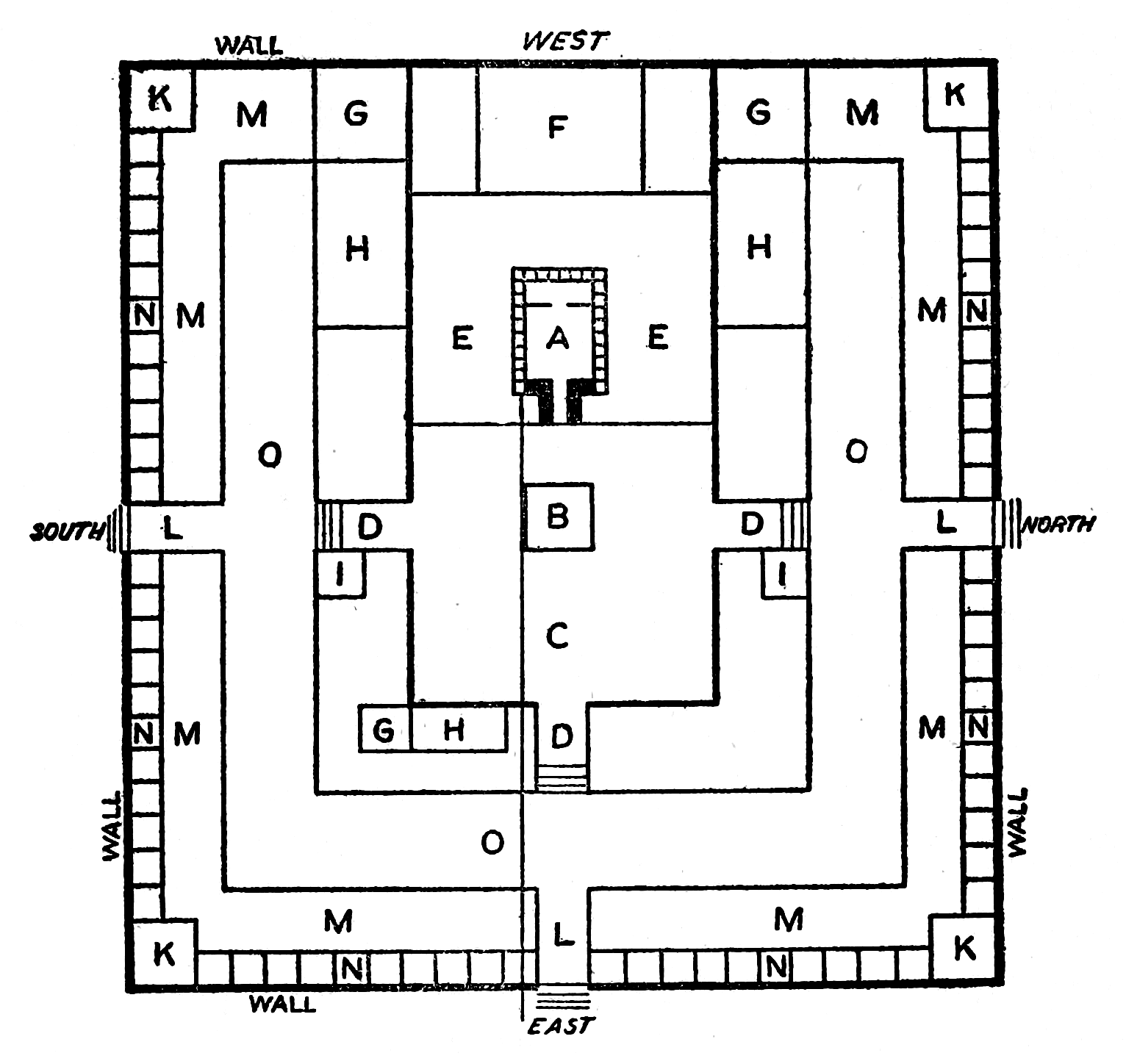
"Ground Plan of Ezekiel's Temple" by dispensationalist author A. C. Gaebelein

Those Protestants who do believe in the importance of a future rebuilt temple (viz., some dispensationalists) hold that the importance of the sacrificial system shifts to a Memorial of the Cross, given the text of Ezekiel Chapters 39 and following (in addition to Millennial references to the Temple in other Old Testament passages); since Ezekiel explains at length the construction and nature of the Millennial temple, in which Jews will once again hold the priesthood; some others hold that perhaps it was not eliminated with Jesus' sacrifice for sin, but is a ceremonial object lesson for confession and forgiveness (somewhat like water baptism and Communion are today); and that such animal sacrifices would still be appropriate for ritual cleansing and for acts of celebration and thanksgiving toward God. Some dispensationalists believe this will be the case with the Second Coming when Jesus reigns over earth from the city of New Jerusalem. Some interpret a passage in the Book of Daniel, Daniel 12:11, as a prophecy that the end of this age will occur shortly after sacrifices are ended in the newly rebuilt temple.

In 1762, Charles Wesley wrote:

We know, it must be done,
For God hath spoke the word,
All Israel shall their Saviour own,
To their first state restor’d:
Re-built by his command,
Jerusalem shall rise,
Her temple on Moriah stand
Again, and touch the skies.

==== Dispensational Evangelical ====
Many Evangelical Christians believe that New Testament prophecies associated with the Jewish Temple, such as Matthew 24–25 and 2 Thessalonians 2:1–12, were not completely fulfilled during the Roman destruction of Jerusalem in 70 CE (a belief of full preterism) and that these prophecies refer to a future temple. This view is a core part of dispensationalism, an interpretative framework of the Bible that stresses biblical literalism and asserts that the Jews remain God's chosen people. According to dispensationalist theologians, such as Hal Lindsey and Tim LaHaye, the Third Temple will be rebuilt when the Antichrist, often identified as the political leader of a trans-national alliance similar to the NATO, the European Union, the United Nations or the United States, secures a peace treaty between the modern nation of Israel and its neighbours following a global war. The Antichrist later uses the temple as a venue for proclaiming himself as God and the long-awaited Messiah, demanding worship from humanity.

=== Latter Day Saints ===
Latter Day Saints (LDS) believe that the Jews will build the Third Temple before the Second Coming of Jesus Christ, and after the Second Coming the Jews will accept Jesus as the Messiah. Most Jews will then embrace the fullness of the Gospel of Jesus Christ. Then, it is believed, the Third Temple will be God's temple as Christ reigns on the earth, and it will become the Jerusalem LDS Temple. There will be many LDS Temples but two main temples will jointly serve as the central governing places – the Jerusalem Temple will function as the resurrected Jesus Christ's Eastern Hemisphere governing place and the New Jerusalem Temple in Independence, Missouri, will function as the resurrected Jesus Christ's Western Hemisphere governing place. Both of these two temples will have thrones for Jesus Christ to sit on during his millennial reign.

The Community of Christ, the second largest denomination of the Latter Day Saint movement, has operated a temple, open to the public, in Independence, Missouri, since 1994. Another denomination of the LDS movement, the Church of Christ (Temple Lot), possess the Temple Lot, the actual spot on which the Temple will be built.

== Muslim view ==
In Islamic tradition, the entire 35-acre compound is venerated as Haram al-Sharif (the Noble Sanctuary) or as the extended perimeter of the Al-Aqsa Mosque compound, constituting the third-holiest site in Islam after Mecca and Medina.The sanctuary holds foundational theological significance: Surah Al-Isra (17:1) in the Quran identifies it as the destination of Muhammad's miraculous night journey (Isra and Mi'raj) from Mecca, from where he is believed to have ascended to heaven from the sacred rock enshrined under the Dome of the Rock. Furthermore, during the earliest years of Muhammad's ministry in Medina, the compound served as the first direction of prayer (qibla) for the nascent Muslim community before the orientation was redirected toward the Kaaba in Mecca.

Muslim theological authorities, the Jerusalem Islamic Waqf, the Palestinian National Authority, and regional custodians—most notably the Hashemite Kingdom of Jordan, which maintains official custodianship under international agreements—universally reject Jewish proposals to construct a Third Temple or alter the religious status of the esplanade. Islamic scholars and political leaders view temple activist campaigns, archaeological excavations along the compound's western and southern flanks, and increasing visits by religious nationalist Jewish groups for public prayer as systematic efforts to erode the Ottoman-era Status Quo arrangements and partition the site. Such initiatives are interpreted within the Muslim world not merely as theological disagreements, but as direct encroachments upon inalienable Islamic religious endowments (waqf) and an existential threat to Islamic architectural heritage.

Pan-Islamic solidarity surrounding the preservation of the site has repeatedly mobilized international political structures. The Organisation of Islamic Cooperation (OIC) was founded in September 1969 following an arson attack on the Qibli Mosque by an Australian fundamentalist, Denis Michael Rohan; the incident catalyzed Muslim-majority heads of state to establish an international body dedicated to coordinating responses to threats against Jerusalem's holy sites. Contemporary declarations by the Arab League, the OIC, and the Al-Quds Committee reaffirm that any physical alteration of the compound or construction of non-Muslim houses of worship within its boundaries represents a red line capable of triggering widespread regional conflict.

== Baháʼí view ==
In the Baháʼí Faith, the prophecy of the Third Temple was fulfilled with the writing of the Súriy-i-Haykal by Bahá'u'lláh in pentacle form. The Súriy-i-Haykal or Tablet of the Temple, is a composite work which consists of a tablet followed by five messages addressed to world leaders; shortly after its completion, Bahá'u'lláh instructed the tablet be written in the form of a pentacle, symbolizing the human temple and added to it the conclusion:

Thus have We built the Temple with the hands of power and might, could ye but know it. This is the Temple promised unto you in the Book. Draw ye nigh unto it. This is that which profiteth you, could ye but comprehend it. Be fair, O peoples of the earth! Which is preferable, this, or a temple which is built of clay? Set your faces towards it. Thus have ye been commanded by God, the Help in Peril, the Self-Subsisting.

Shoghi Effendi, the head of the Baháʼí Faith in the first half of the 20th century, explained that this verse refers to the prophecy in the Hebrew Bible where Zechariah had promised the rebuilding of the Temple in the End Times as fulfilled in the return of the Manifestation of God, Bahá'u'lláh, in a human temple. Throughout the tablet, Bahá'u'lláh addresses the Temple (himself) and explains the glory which is invested in it allowing all the nations of the world to find redemption. In the tablet, Bahá'u'lláh states that the Manifestation of God is a pure mirror that reflects the sovereignty of God and manifests God's beauty and grandeur to mankind. In essence, Bahá'u'lláh explains that the Manifestation of God is a "Living Temple" and Bahá'u'lláh addresses the organs and limbs of the human body and bids each to focus on God and not the earthly world.

== See also ==
- Apocalypse of Zerubbabel
- Beautiful Gate
- Ezekiel's Temple
- Red heifer
- Temple
- Temple Institute
