= Temple Institute =

Religious organization in Israel

Coordinates: 31°46′31.73″N 35°13′59.16″E

- מכון המקדש

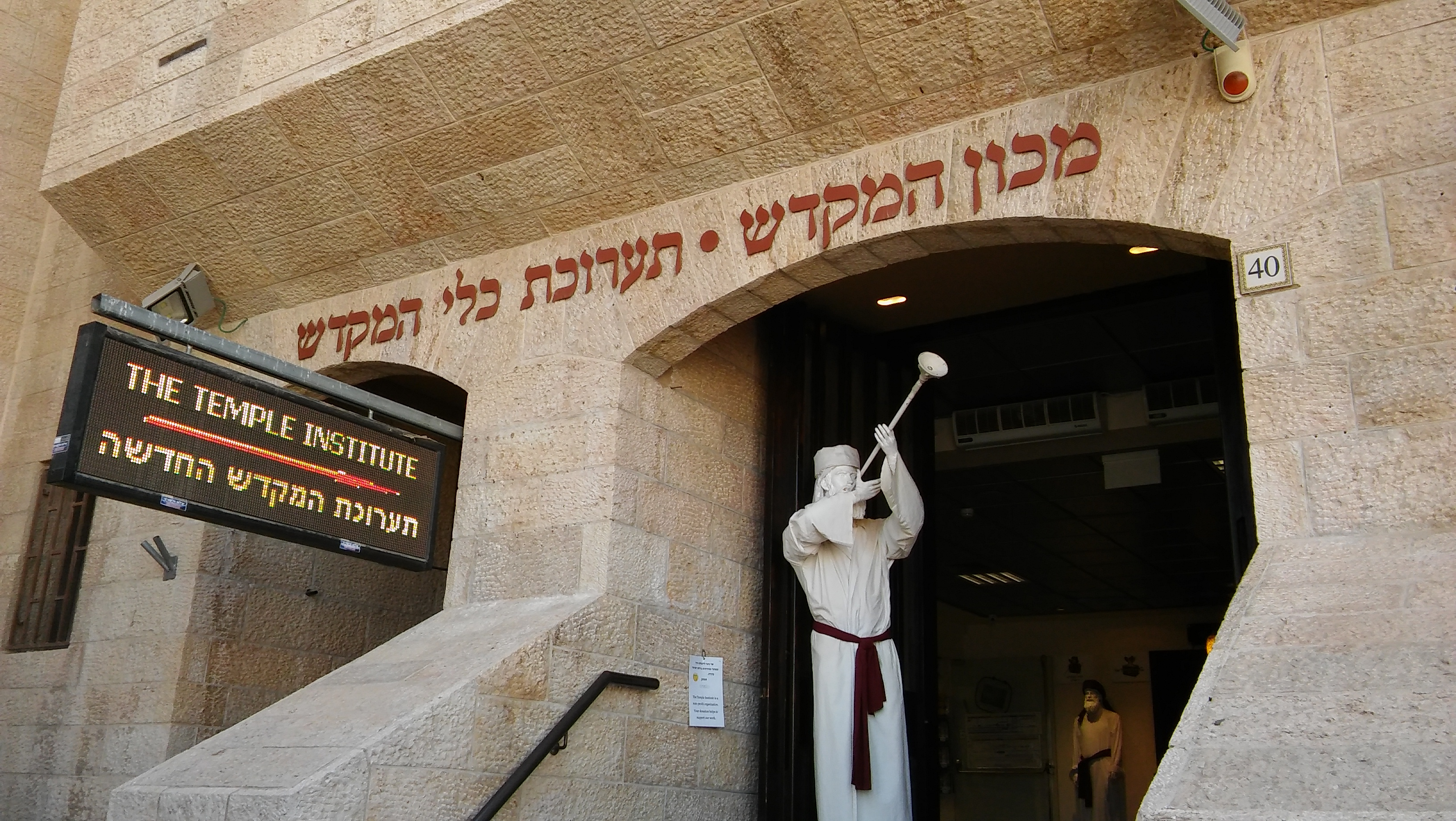
- The Temple Institute
- Established: 1987
- Location: Jerusalem
- Founder: Rav Yisroel Ariel
- Director: David Schwartz
- Website: www.templeinstitute.org

The Temple Institute, known in Hebrew as Machon HaMikdash (Hebrew: מכון המקדש), is an organization in Israel focusing on establishing the Third Temple. Its long-term aims are to build the third Temple in Jerusalem on the Temple Mount—the site of the Dome of the Rock—and to reinstate korbanot and the other rites described in the Hebrew Bible and Jewish legal literature. It aspires to reach this goal through the study of the previous Temples' construction and rituals and through the development of Temple ritual objects, garments, and building plans which the Institute intends for use in any future rebuilt Temple. It runs a museum in the Jewish Quarter of the Old City of Jerusalem. It was founded and is headed by Rabbi Israel Ariel. Its current director-general is Dovid Shvartz. New York billionaire Henry Swieca has supported the Institute. The Israeli government has also provided funding.

== Activities ==
=== Building of Temple ritual items ===
The Temple Institute has been preparing ritual objects suitable for Temple use as part of its ongoing effort to prepare for a future rebuilt Temple. The Temple Institute has made many of the over ninety ritual items to be used in the Temple.

As of June 2008, a major project of the Institute was the creation of the sacred uniforms of the Kohen Gadol (the High Priest) and ordinary priests. This project, the culmination of years of study and research, had already been underway for several years. The High Priest's Hoshen (breastplate) and Ephod have been completed. The Tzitz, the High Priest's golden crown, was completed in 2007. The Temple Institute is designing the garments for the lay priests intended for purchase by Kohanim.

Levite singers also sing on the Temple Mount.

Silver trumpets have also been made, which the Institute intends for ceremonial use on the Temple Mount.

=== Red heifer ===
In addition to a variety of items required for service within the Temple, the Institute has attempted to locate a parah adumah (red heifer) consistent with the requirements of Numbers 19:1–22 and Mishnah Tractate Parah for purposes of taharah (purification) necessary to enter the Temple sanctuary proper in most circumstances. Previously, the institute identified two candidates, one in 1997 and another in 2002. The Temple Institute had initially declared both kosher, but later found each to be unsuitable. More recently in September 2022, 5 perfect unblemished red heifers were brought to Israel from the USA and found to meet the qualifications after being inspected by rabbis. The heifers will be fed and cared for until the time that they can be slaughtered and used to create the necessary ashes for purification.

== Controversies ==
=== Rebuilding a Jewish temple on the Temple Mount ===
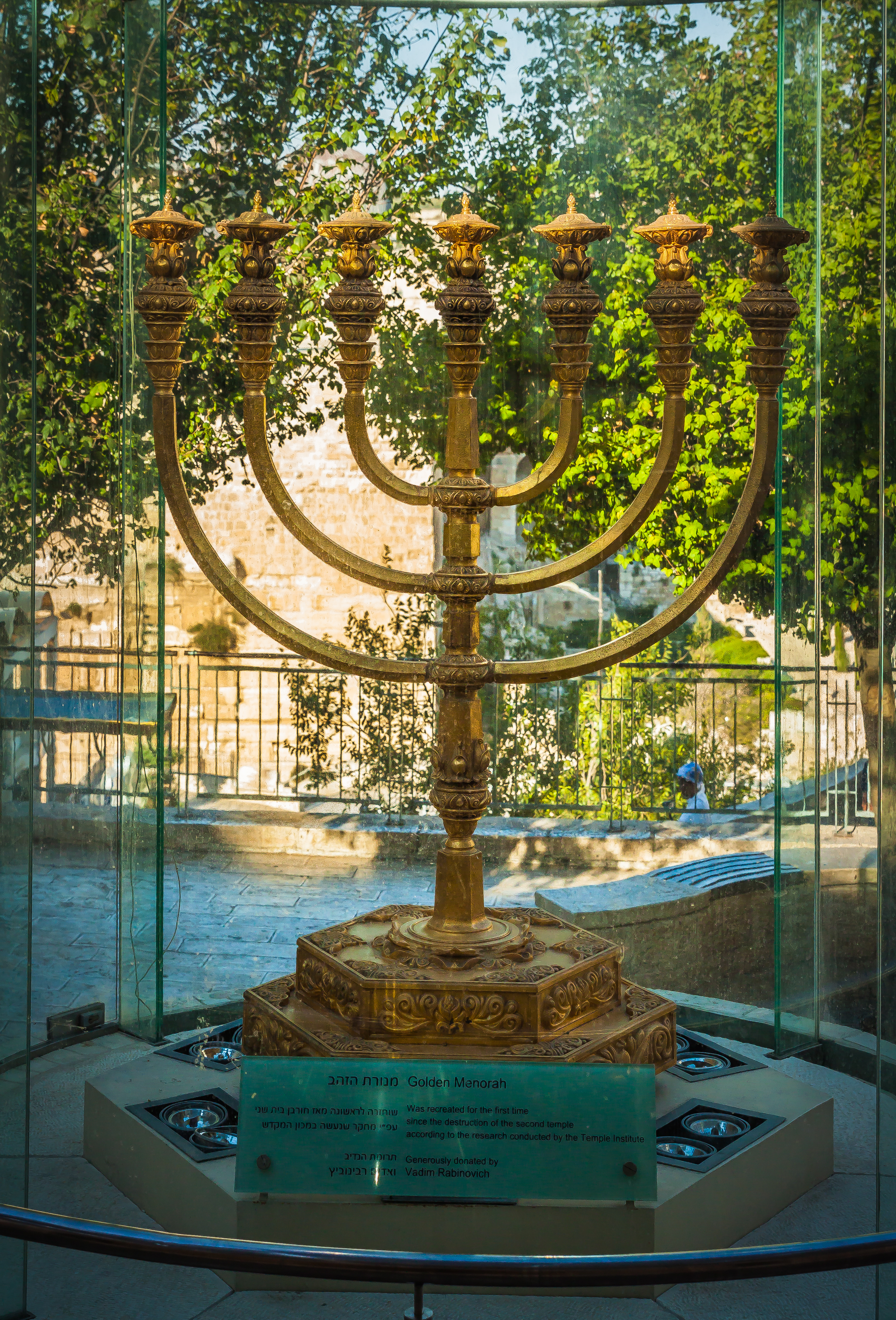
The model of the Temple Menorah next to the Temple Institute

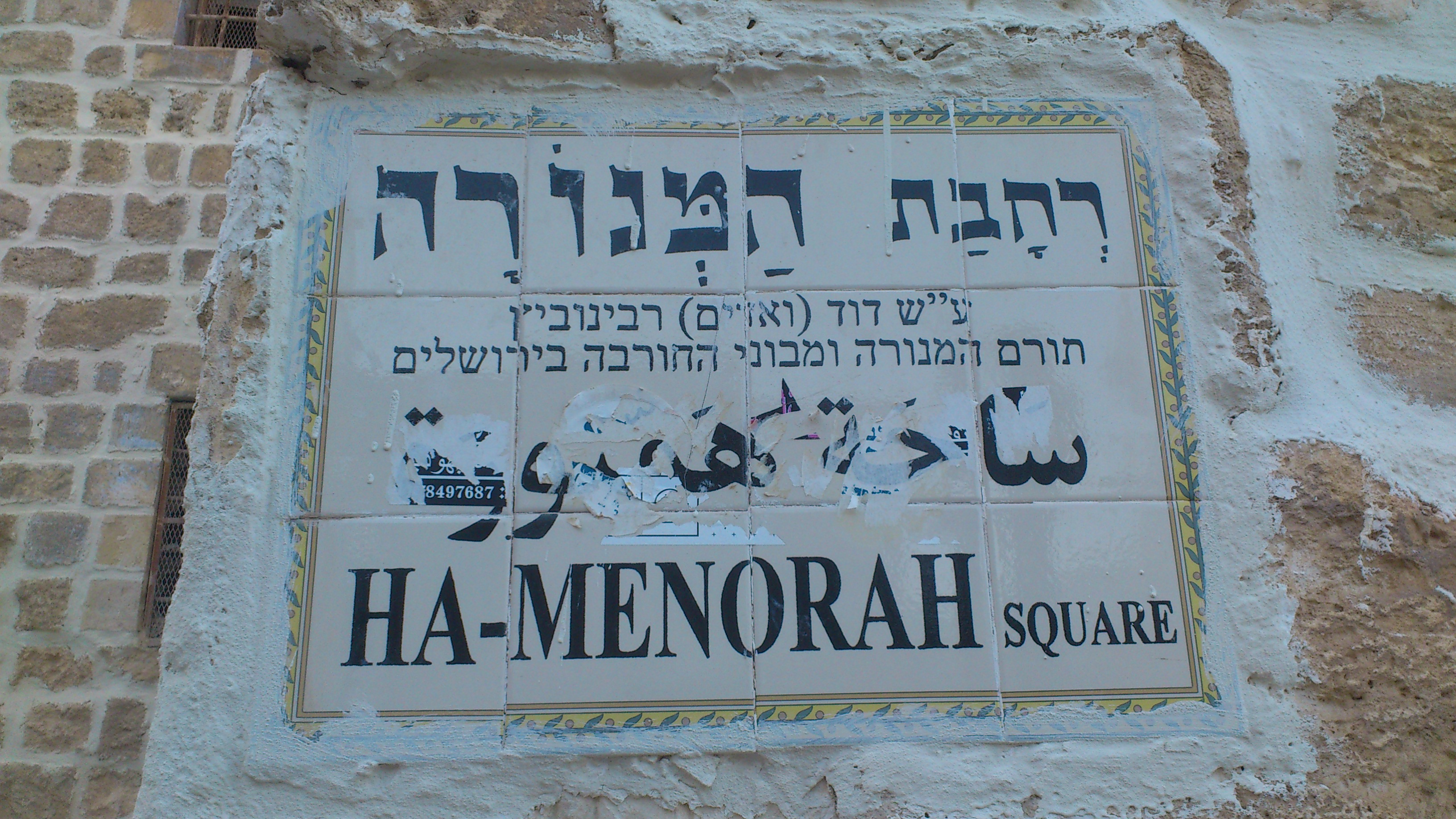
The Menorah Square and viewpoint to the Temple Mount next to the Temple Institute

Although Orthodox Judaism generally agrees that the Temple in Jerusalem will and should be rebuilt, there is a substantial disagreement about whether this should occur by human hands rather than divine will. The Temple Institute interprets the opinion of the Rambam (Maimonides) as saying that Jews should attempt to build the Temple themselves and that it is a mitzvah (obligation) to do so if they can. However, Rambam's opinion is controversial and has aroused substantial opposition.

Maimonides scholars do not universally accept the Temple Institute's interpretation of his thought. According to seventeenth-century rabbi Yom-Tov Lipman Heller, in his commentary on tractate Yoma, the Rambam did not say that Jews can build the future Temple without the guidance of the Messiah.

=== Ascending the Temple Mount ===
The rabbis associated with the Temple Institute hold—also following the Rambam—that, under certain conditions, it is permissible under Jewish law for Jews to visit parts of the Temple Mount and periodically organize groups to ascend and tour the Mount. The view that Jews may ascend the Temple is controversial among Orthodox rabbis, with many authorities completely prohibiting visiting the Mount to prevent accidental entrance into and desecration of the Holy of Holies or other sacred off-limits areas.

The Temple Institute conducts aliyot (literally, "ascending" or "making a pilgrimage") to the Temple Mount.

== See also ==
- HaLiba – Israeli political activist and politician
- Modern attempts to revive the Sanhedrin
- Temple Mount Administration – Israeli far-right activist group
- Meir Kahane, far-right Israeli rabbi and convicted terrorist
- Jewish fundamentalism
