= Killing of Muhammad al-Durrah =

2000 shooting of a child in the Gaza Strip

- Part of the Second Intifada
- Muhammad (left) and Jamal al-Durrah (right) filmed by Talal Abu Rahma for France 2
- Date: 30 September 2000; 26 years ago
- Time: c. 15:00 (IDT, UTC+3)
- Location: Netzarim Junction, Gaza Strip; 31°27′53″N 34°25′38″E
- First reporter: Charles Enderlin for France 2
- Filmed by: Talal Abu Rahma
- Deaths: Reported deaths: Muhammad al-Durrah; Bassam al-Bilbeisi, ambulance driver
- Injuries: Multiple gunshot wounds: Jamal al-Durrah
- Awards: Rory Peck Award (2001), for Talal Abu Rahma
- Footage: Charles Enderlin, "La mort de Mohammed al Dura", France 2, 30 September 2000 (raw footage; disputed section)

On 30 September 2000, the second day of the Second Intifada, 12-year-old Muhammad al-Durrah (Arabic: محمد الدرة, romanized: Muḥammad ad-Durra) was killed at the Netzarim Junction in the Gaza Strip during widespread protests and riots across the Palestinian territories against Israeli military occupation. Jamal al-Durrah and his son Muhammad were filmed by Talal Abu Rahma, a Palestinian television cameraman freelancing for France 2, as they were caught in crossfire between the Israeli military and Palestinian security forces. Footage shows them crouching behind a concrete cylinder, the boy crying and the father waving, then a burst of gunfire and dust. Muhammad is shown slumping as he is mortally wounded by gunfire, dying soon after.

Fifty-nine seconds of the footage were broadcast on television in France with a voiceover from Charles Enderlin, the station's bureau chief in Israel. Based on information from the cameraman, Enderlin told viewers that the al-Durrahs had been the target of fire from the Israeli positions and that the boy had died. After an emotional public funeral, Muhammad was hailed throughout the Muslim world as a martyr.

Initially, the Israel Defense Forces (IDF) accepted responsibility for the shooting, but claimed that Palestinians used children as human shields; the IDF retracted its admission of responsibility in 2005. In 2000, the IDF commissioned Nahum Shahaf to investigate, producing a report which provoked widespread criticism. One of the Israeli investigators claimed the incident had been staged by Palestinian gunmen, cameraman and Muhammad's own father. The report eventually concluded that Muhammad was possibly killed by Palestinian fire. However, a Palestinian investigation that same year concluded Muhammad was killed by bullets that came from the Israeli post.

In 2012, Prime Minister Benjamin Netanyahu commissioned another investigation. In 2013, that report concluded that not only was Muhammad not hit by IDF fire, Muhammad was perhaps never shot nor killed. Jamal al-Durrah rejected the idea that his son was somehow not dead and offered to exhume Muhammad's grave. The report was criticized by Charles Enderlin and France 2, Reporters Without Borders and Barak Ravid. In France, Philippe Karsenty, a media commentator, also alleged that the scene had been staged by France 2; France 2 sued him for libel in 2006 leading to Karsenty's eventual conviction in 2013 for the allegation.

The footage of the father and son acquired what one writer called the power of a battle flag. Postage stamps in the Middle East carried the images. Abu Rahma's coverage of the al-Durrah shooting brought him several journalism awards, including the Rory Peck Award in 2001.

== Background ==
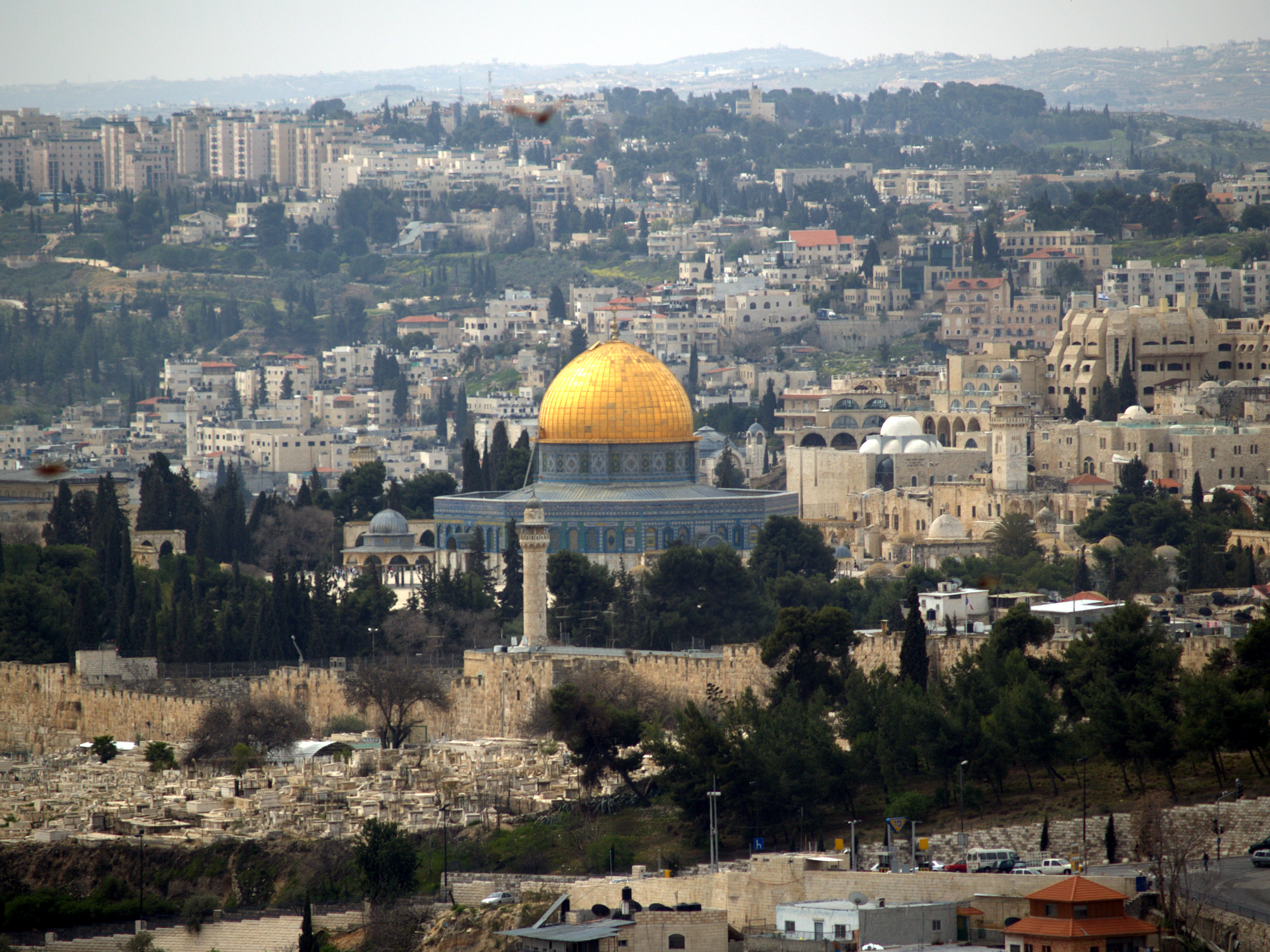
Temple Mount

On 28 September 2000, two days before the shooting, the Israeli opposition leader Ariel Sharon visited the Temple Mount in the Old City of Jerusalem, a holy site in both Judaism and Islam with contested rules of access. The violence that followed had its roots in several events, but the visit was provocative and triggered protests that escalated into rioting across the West Bank and Gaza Strip. (Note: The May 2001 Mitchell Report into what caused the violence concluded: "[W]e have no basis on which to conclude that there was a deliberate plan by the PA [Palestinian Authority] to initiate a campaign of violence at the first opportunity; or to conclude that there was a deliberate plan by the GOI [Government of Israel] to respond with lethal force ... The Sharon visit did not cause the 'Al-Aqsa Intifada'. But it was poorly timed and the provocative effect should have been foreseen ...") The uprising became known as the Second Intifada; it lasted over four years and cost around 4,000 lives, over 3,000 of them Palestinian.

The Netzarim junction, where the shooting took place, is known locally as the al-Shohada (martyrs') junction. It lies on Saladin Road, a few kilometres south of Gaza City. The source of conflict at the junction was the nearby Netzarim settlement, where 60 Israeli families lived until Israel's withdrawal from Gaza in 2005. A military escort accompanied the settlers whenever they left or arrived at the settlement, and an Israeli military outpost, Magen-3, guarded the approach. The area had been the scene of violent incidents in the days before the shooting.

== People ==
=== Jamal and Muhammad al-Durrah ===
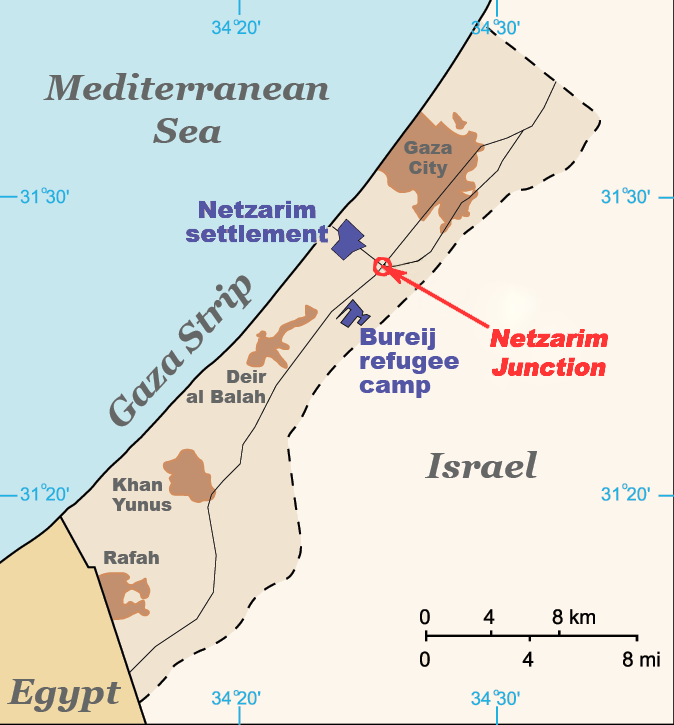
Netzarim junction and the nearby Bureij refugee camp and Netzarim settlement

Jamal al-Durrah (Arabic: جمال الدرة, romanized: Jamāl ad-Durra; born c. 1963) was a carpenter and house painter before the shooting. Since then, because of his injuries, he has worked as a truck driver. He and his wife, Amal, live in the UNRWA-run Bureij refugee camp in the Gaza Strip. As of 2013 they had four daughters and six sons, including a boy, Muhammad, born two years after the shooting.

Until the shooting, Jamal had worked for Moshe Tamam, an Israeli contractor, for 20 years, since he was 14. Writer Helen Schary Motro came to know Jamal when she employed him to help build her house in Tel Aviv. She described his years of rising at 3:30 am to catch the bus to the border crossing at four, then a second bus out of Gaza so he could be at work by six. Tamam called him a "terrific man", someone he trusted to work alone in his customers' homes.

During the Gaza war, both of Jamal Al-Durrah's brothers were killed by Israeli airstrikes, and he was seen mourning next to their body bags.

Muhammad Jamal Al-Durrah (born 22 November 1988 in the Gaza strip) was in fifth grade, but his school was closed on 30 September 2000; the Palestinian Authority had called for a general strike and day of mourning following violence in Jerusalem the day before. His mother said he had been watching the rioting on television and asked if he could join in. Father and son decided instead to go to a car auction. Jamal had just sold his 1974 Fiat, Motro wrote, and Muhammad loved cars, so they went to the auction together.

=== Charles Enderlin ===
Charles Enderlin was born in 1945 in Paris; his grandparents were Austrian Jews who had left the country in 1938 when Germany invaded. After briefly studying medicine, he moved to Jerusalem in 1968 where he became an Israeli national. He began working for France 2 in 1981, serving as their bureau chief in Israel from 1990 until his retirement in 2015. Enderlin is the author of several books about the Middle East, including one about Muhammad al-Durrah, Un Enfant est Mort: Netzarim, 30 Septembre 2000 (2010). Highly regarded among his peers and within the French establishment, he submitted a letter from Jacques Chirac, during the Philippe Karsenty libel action, who wrote in flattering terms of Enderlin's integrity. In 2009, he was awarded France's highest decoration, the Légion d'honneur.

According to French journalist Anne-Elisabeth Moutet, Enderlin's coverage of the Israeli-Palestinian conflict was respected by other journalists but was regularly criticized by pro-Israel groups. As a result of the al-Durrah case, he received death threats, his wife was assaulted in the street, his children were threatened, the family had to move home, and at one point they considered emigrating to the United States.

=== Talal Abu Rahma ===
Talal Hassan Abu Rahma studied business administration in the United States, and began working as a freelance cameraman for France 2 in Gaza in 1988. At the time of the shooting, he ran his own press office, the National News Center, contributed to CNN through the Al-Wataneya Press Office, and was a board member of the Palestinian Journalists' Association. His coverage of the al-Durrah shooting brought him several journalism awards, including the Rory Peck Award in 2001. According to France 2 correspondent Gérard Grizbec, Abu Rahma had never been a member of a Palestinian political group, had twice been arrested by Palestinian police for filming images that did not meet the approval of Yasser Arafat, and had never been accused of security breaches by Israel.

== Events of the shooting ==
=== Before shooting ===
External image
- 3D diagram of the Netzarim junction from The Guardian

(Above) From Talal Abu Rahma, France 2 cameraman
(Below) From a report commissioned by Philippe Karsenty for the Court of Appeal of Paris; it includes a position in the lower-left quadrant in which armed Palestinian police allegedly stood.

On the day of the shooting—Rosh Hashanah, the Jewish New Year—the two-story Israel Defense Forces (IDF) outpost at the Netzarim junction was manned by Israeli soldiers from the Givati Brigade Engineering Platoon and the Herev Battalion. According to Enderlin, the soldiers were Druze.

The two-story IDF outpost sat northwest of the junction. Two six-story Palestinian blocks (known as the twins or twin towers and described variously as offices or apartments) lay directly behind it. South of the junction, diagonally across from the IDF, there was a Palestinian National Security Forces outpost under the command of Brigadier-General Osama al-Ali, a member of the Palestine National Council. The concrete wall that Jamal and Muhammad crouched against was in front of this building; the spot was less than 120 metres from the most northerly point of the Israeli outpost.

In addition to France 2, the Associated Press and Reuters also had camera crews at the junction. They captured brief footage of the al-Durrahs and Abu Rahma. Abu Rahma was the only journalist to film the moment the al-Durrahs were shot.

=== Arrival at the junction ===
Jamal and Muhammad arrived at the junction in a cab around midday, on their way back from the car auction. There had been a protest, demonstrators had thrown stones, and the IDF had responded with tear gas. Abu Rahma was filming events and interviewing protesters, including Abdel Hakim Awad, head of the Fatah youth movement in Gaza. Because of the protest, a police officer stopped Jamal and Muhammad's cab from going any further, so father and son proceeded on foot across the junction. It was at that point, according to Jamal, that the live fire started. Enderlin said the first shots were fired from the Palestinian positions and returned by the Israeli soldiers.

Jamal, Muhammad, the Associated Press cameraman, and Shams Oudeh, the Reuters cameraman, took cover against the concrete wall in the south-east quadrant of the crossroads, diagonally across from the Israeli outpost. Jamal, Muhammad and Shams Oudeh crouched behind a three-foot-tall (0.91 m) concrete drum, apparently part of a culvert, that was sitting against the wall. A thick paving stone sat on top of the drum, which offered further protection. Abu Rahma hid behind a white minibus parked across the road about 15 metres away from the wall. The Reuters and Associated Press cameramen briefly filmed over Jamal and Muhammad's shoulders—the cameras pointing toward the Israeli outpost—before the men moved away. Jamal and Muhammad did not move away, but stayed behind the drum for 45 minutes. In Enderlin's view, they were frozen in fear.

=== France 2 report ===
Muhammad and Jamal under fire

Camera goes out of focus as gunfire is heard.

One of the last frames broadcast.

In an affidavit three days after the shooting, Abu Rahma said shots had been fired for about 45 minutes and that he had filmed around 27 minutes of it. (Note: Talal Abu Rahma, 3 October 2000: "I spent approximately 27 minutes photographing the incident which took place for 45 minutes ... Shooting started first from different sources, Israeli and Palestinian. It lasted for not more than five minutes. Then, it was quite clear for me that shooting was towards the child Mohammed and his father from the opposite direction to them. Intensive and intermittent shooting was directed at the two and the two outposts of the Palestinian National Security Forces. The Palestinian outposts were not a source of shooting, as shooting from inside these outposts had stopped after the first five minutes, and the child and his father were not injured then. Injuring and killing took place during the following 45 minutes.") (How much film was shot became a bone of contention in 2007 when France 2 told a court that only 18 minutes of film existed.) He began filming Jamal and Muhammad when he heard Muhammad cry and saw that the boy had been shot in the right leg. He said he filmed the scene containing the father and son for about six minutes. He sent those six minutes to Enderlin in Jerusalem via satellite. Enderlin edited the footage down to 59 seconds and added a voiceover:

1500 hours. Everything has just erupted near the settlement of Netzarim in the Gaza Strip. The Palestinians have shot live bullets, the Israelis are responding. Paramedics, journalists, passersby are caught in the crossfire. Here, Jamal and his son Mohammed are the target of fire from the Israeli positions. Mohammed is twelve, his father is trying to protect him. He is motioning. Another burst of fire. Mohammed is dead and his father seriously wounded.

The footage shows Jamal and Muhammad crouching behind the cylinder, the child screaming and the father shielding him. Jamal appears to shout something in the direction of the cameraman, then waves and shouts in the direction of the Israeli outpost. There is a burst of gunfire and the camera goes out of focus. When the gunfire subsides, Jamal is sitting upright and injured and Muhammad is lying over his legs. Enderlin cut a final few seconds from the footage that shows Muhammad lift his hand from his face. This cut became the basis of much of the controversy over the film.

The raw footage stops suddenly at this point and begins again with unidentified people being loaded into an ambulance. (At that point in his report, Enderlin said: "A Palestinian policeman and an ambulance driver have also lost their lives in the course of this battle.") Bassam al-Bilbeisi, an ambulance driver on his way to the scene, was reported to have been shot and killed, leaving a widow and eleven children. Abu Rahma said Muhammad lay bleeding for at least 17 minutes before an ambulance picked up father and son together. He said he did not film them being picked up because he was worried about having only one battery. Abu Rahma remained at the junction for 30–40 minutes until he felt it was safe to leave, then drove to his studio in Gaza City to send the footage to Enderlin. The 59 seconds of footage were first broadcast on France 2's nightly news at 8:00 pm local time (GMT+2), after which France 2 distributed several minutes of raw footage around the world without charge.

=== Funeral ===
The pathologist who examined Muhammad gave this image to a journalist in 2009.

Jamal and Muhammad were taken by ambulance to the Al-Shifa Hospital in Gaza City. Abu Rahma telephoned the hospital and was told that three bodies had arrived there: that of a jeep driver, an ambulance driver, and a boy, initially mistakenly identified as Rami Al-Durrah.

According to Abed El-Razeq El Masry, the pathologist who examined Muhammad, the boy had received a fatal injury to the abdomen. In 2002, he showed Esther Schapira, a German journalist, post-mortem images of Muhammad next to identity cards identifying him by name. Schapira also obtained, from a Palestinian journalist, footage of Muhammad arriving at Al-Shifa Hospital on a stretcher.

During an emotional public funeral in Bureij, Muhammad was wrapped in a Palestinian flag and buried before sundown on the day of his death, in accordance with Muslim tradition.

Jamal was taken at first to the Al-Shifa Hospital in Gaza. One of the surgeons who operated on him, Ahmed Ghadeel, said Jamal had received multiple wounds from high-velocity bullets striking his right elbow, right thigh and the lower part of both legs; his femoral artery was also cut. Talal Abu Rahma interviewed Jamal and the doctor there on camera the day after the shooting; Ghadeel displayed x-rays of Jamal's right elbow and right pelvis. (Note: Talal Abu Rahma, 3 October 2000: "On the following day of the incident, I went to Shifa Hospital in Gaza, and interviewed the father of child Mohammed Al-Durreh. The interview was videotaped and broadcast. In the interview, I asked him about his reason and circumstances of being at the place of the incident. I was the first journalist to interview him on this subject. Mr. Jamal al-Durrah said that he was going accompanied by his son Mohammed to the car market, which is about 2km away to the north of Al-Shohada' Junction, to buy a car. He told me that he failed to buy a car, so decided to go home. He and his son took a taxi. When they got close to the junction, they could not move forward because of the clashes and shooting there. So, they got out of the taxi and tried to walk towards Al-Bureij. As shooting intensified, they sheltered behind a concrete block. Then the incident occurred. Shooting lasted for 45 minutes.") Moshe Tamam, Jamal's Israeli employer, offered to have him taken to hospital in Tel Aviv, but the Palestinian Authority declined the offer. He was transferred instead to the King Hussein Medical Center in Amman, Jordan, where he was visited by King Abdullah. Jamal reportedly told Tamam that he had been hit by nine bullets; he said five were removed from his body in a hospital in Gaza and four in Amman.

=== Abu Rahma's account ===
Talal Abu Rahma, the Palestinian cameraman for Enderlin, alleged that the IDF had shot Muhammad and his father. Abu Rahma was clear in interviews that the Israelis had fired the shots. For example, he told The Guardian: "They were cleaning the area. Of course they saw the father. They were aiming at the boy, and that is what surprised me, yes, because they were shooting at him, not only one time, but many times." He said shooting was also coming from the Palestinian National Security Forces outpost, but that they were not shooting when Muhammad was hit. The Israeli fire was being directed at this Palestinian outpost, he said. He told National Public Radio:

I saw the boy getting injured in his leg, and the father asking for help. Then I saw him getting injured in his arm, the father. The father was asking the ambulances to help him, because he could see the ambulances. I cannot see the ambulance ... I wasn't far away, maybe from them [Jamal and Muhammad] face to face about 15 meters, 17 meters. But the father didn't succeed to get the ambulance by waving to them. He looked at me and he said, "Help me." I said, "I cannot, I can't help you." The shooting till then was really heavy ... It was really raining bullets, for more than for 45 minutes.

Then ... I hear something, "boom!" Really is coming with a lot of dust. I looked at the boy, I filmed the boy lying down in the father's lap, and the father really, getting really injured, and he was really dizzy. I said, "Oh my god, the boy's got killed, the boy's got killed," I was screaming, I was losing my mind. While I was filming, the boy got killed ... I was very afraid, I was very upset, I was crying, and I was remembering my children ... This was the most terrible thing that has happened to me as a journalist.

Abu Rahma said in an affidavit, "the child was intentionally and in cold blood shot dead and his father injured by the Israeli army." (Note: Talal Abu Rahma, 3 October 2000: "I can assert that shooting at the child Mohammed and his father Jamal came from the above-mentioned Israeli military outpost, as it was the only place from which shooting at the child and his father was possible. So, by logic and nature, my long experience in covering hot incidents and violent clashes, and my ability to distinguish sounds of shooting, I can confirm that the child was intentionally and in cold blood shot dead and his father injured by the Israeli army.") The affidavit was given to the Palestinian Centre for Human Rights in Gaza and signed by Abu Rahma in the presence of Raji Sourani, a human rights lawyer.

Abu Rahma said there was intense exchange of fire between Israelis and Palestinians, but the Durrahs had not been shot during that period. Instead, after that exchange of fire, there was sustained fire from the Israeli outpost for around 30 minutes and it is during that time that both the father and son had been shot.

=== Israel's response ===
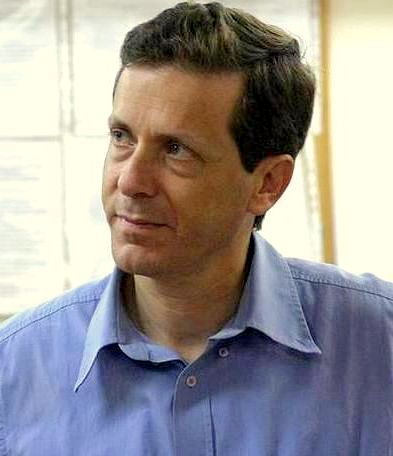
Isaac Herzog was then Israel's Cabinet Secretary.

The position of the IDF changed over time, from accepting responsibility in 2000 to retracting the admission in 2005. The IDF's first response, when Enderlin contacted them before his broadcast, was that the Palestinians "make cynical use of women and children", which he decided not to air.

On 3 October 2000, the IDF's chief of operations, Major-General Giora Eiland, said an internal investigation indicated the shots had apparently been fired by Israeli soldiers. The soldiers, under fire, had been shooting from small slits in the wall of their outpost; General Yom-Tov Samia, then head of the IDF's Southern Command said they may not have had a clear field of vision, and had fired in the direction from which they believed the fire was coming. Eiland issued an apology: "This was a grave incident, an event we are all sorry about."

The Israelis had been trying for hours to speak to Palestinian commanders, according to Israel's Cabinet Secretary, Isaac Herzog; he added that Palestinian security forces could have intervened to stop the fire.

After the shooting, the Israeli army proceeded to destroy much of the physical evidence, including razing the wall behind Muhammad al-Durrah. The IDF justified this by arguing it needed to remove hiding places for Palestinian gunmen.

== Controversy ==
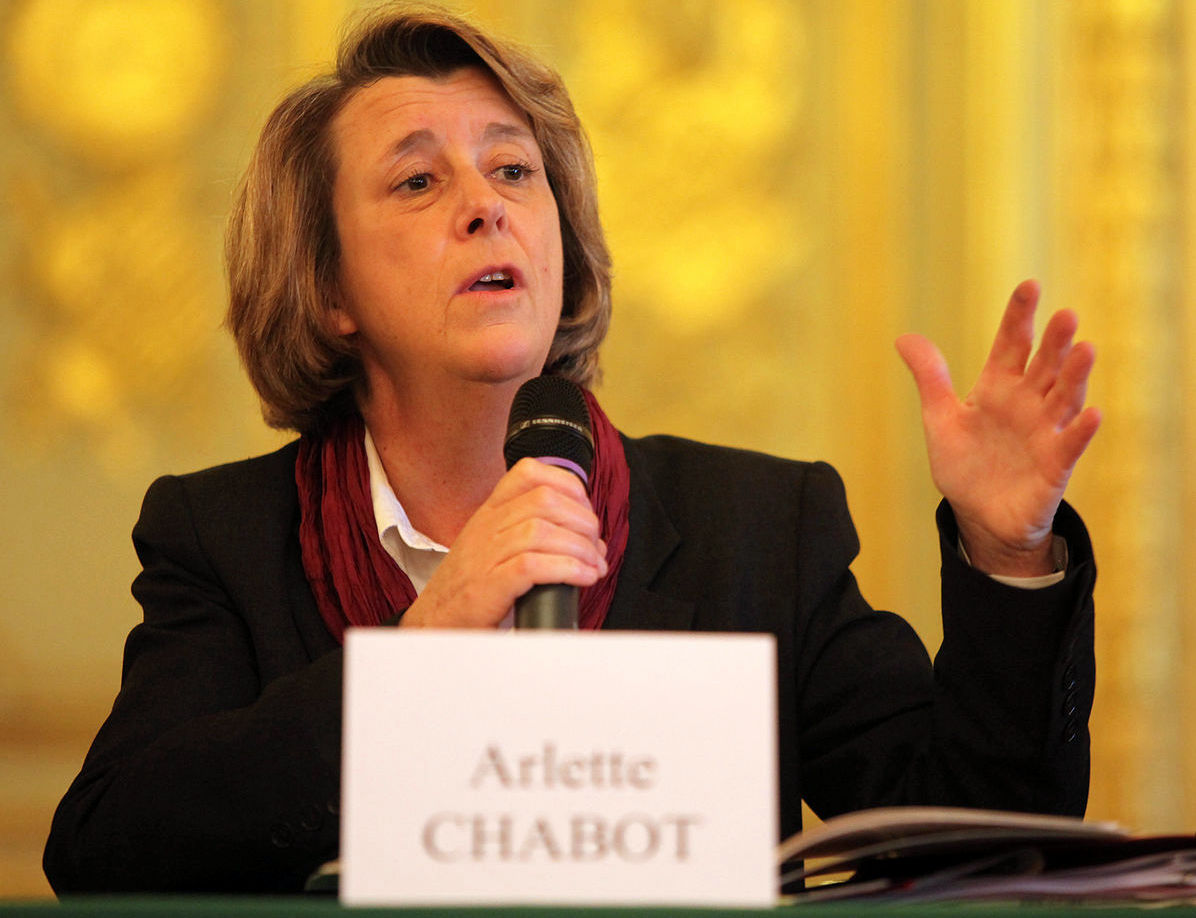
France 2 news editor, Arlette Chabot, said that no one could say for certain who fired the shots.

Three mainstream narratives emerged after the shooting. The early view that Israeli gunfire had killed the boy developed into the position that, because of the trajectory of the shots, Palestinian gunfire was more likely to have been responsible. This view was expressed in 2005 by Denis Jeambar, editor-in-chief of L'Express, and Daniel Leconte, a former France 2 correspondent, who viewed the raw footage. A third perspective, held by Arlette Chabot, France 2's news editor, is that no one can know who fired the shots.

A fourth, minority, position held that the scene was staged by Palestinian protesters to produce a child martyr or at least the appearance of one. This is known by those who follow the case as the "maximalist" view, as opposed to the "minimalist" view that the shots were probably not fired by the IDF. The maximalist view takes the form either that the al-Durrahs were not shot and Muhammad did not die, or that he was killed intentionally by Palestinians.

The view that the scene was a media hoax of some kind emerged from an Israeli government enquiry in November 2000. It was most persistently pursued by Stéphane Juffa, editor-in-chief of the Metula News Agency (Mena), a French-Israeli company; Luc Rosenzweig, former editor-in-chief of Le Monde and a Mena contributor; Richard Landes, an American historian who became involved after Enderlin showed him the raw footage during a visit to Jerusalem in 2003; and Philippe Karsenty, founder of a French media-watchdog site, Media-Ratings. It was also supported by Gérard Huber, a French psychoanalyst, and Pierre-André Taguieff, a French philosopher who specializes in antisemitism, both of whom wrote books about the affair. The hoax view gained further support in 2013 from a second Israeli government report, the Kuperwasser report. Several commentators regard it as a conspiracy theory and smear campaign.

=== Key issues ===
Several commentators questioned what time the shooting occurred; what time Muhammad arrived at the hospital; why there seemed to be little blood on the ground where they were shot; and whether any bullets were collected. Several alleged that, in other scenes in the raw footage, it is clear that protesters are play acting. One physician maintained that Jamal's scars were not from bullet wounds, but dated back to an injury he sustained in the early 1990s.

There was no criminal inquiry. Palestinian police allowed journalists to photograph the scene the following day, but they gathered no forensic evidence. According to a Palestinian general, there was no Palestinian investigation because there was no doubt that the Israelis had killed the boy. General Yom Tov Samia of the IDF said the presence of protesters meant the Israelis were unable to examine and take photographs of the scene. The increase in violence at the junction cut off the Nezarim settlers, so the IDF evacuated them and, a week after the shooting, blew up everything within 500 metres of the IDF outpost, thereby destroying the crime scene.

A pathologist examined the boy's body, but there was no full autopsy. It is unclear whether bullets were recovered from the scene or from Jamal and Muhammad. In 2002 Abu Rahma implied to Esther Schapira that he had collected bullets at the scene, adding: "We have some secrets for ourselves. We cannot give anything ... everything." According to Jamal al-Durrah, five bullets were recovered from his body by physicians in Gaza and four in Amman. In 2013 he said, without elaborating: "The bullets the Israelis fired are in the possession of the Palestinian Authority."

=== Footage ===
==== Length and content ====
Questions arose about how much footage existed and whether it showed the boy had died. Abu Rahma said in an affidavit that the gunfight had lasted 45 minutes and that he had filmed about 27 minutes of it. Doreen Carvajal of the International Herald Tribune said in 2005 that France 2 had shown the newspaper "the original 27-minute tape of the incident". (Note: "As questions were raised, some France 2 executives privately faulted the channel's communication. Last week, they showed The International Herald Tribune the original 27-minute tape of the incident, which also included separate scenes of rock-throwing youths.") When the Court of Appeal of Paris asked, in 2007, to see all the footage, during France 2's libel case against Philippe Karsenty, France 2 presented the court with 18 minutes of film, saying the rest had been destroyed because it had not been about the shooting. Enderlin then said only 18 minutes of footage had been shot.

According to Abu Rahma, six minutes of his footage focused on the al-Durrahs. France 2 broadcast 59 seconds of that scene and released another few seconds of it. No part of the footage shows the boy dead. Enderlin cut a final few seconds from the end, during which Muhammad appears to lift his hand away from his face. Enderlin said he had cut this scene in accordance with the France 2 ethical charter, because it showed the boy in his death throes ("agonie"), the final struggle before death, which he said was "unbearable" ("J'ai coupé l'agonie de l'enfant. C'était insupportable ... Cela n'aurait rien apporté de plus). (Note: Charles Enderlin, The Atlantic, September 2003: "James Fallows writes, 'The footage of the shooting ... illustrates the way in which television transforms reality' and, notably, 'France 2 or its cameraman may have footage that it or he has chosen not to release.' We do not transform reality. But since some parts of the scene are unbearable, France 2 cut a few seconds from the scene, in accordance with our ethical charter.")

==== Footage cut off ====
Another issue is why France 2, the Associated Press and Reuters did not film the scene directly after the shooting, including the shooting death of the ambulance driver who arrived to pick up Jamal and Muhammad. Abu Rahma's footage stops suddenly after the shooting of the father and son, then begins again—from the same position, with the white minibus behind which Abu Rahma was standing visible in the shot—with other people being loaded into an ambulance.

Abu Rahma said Muhammad lay bleeding for at least 17 minutes before an ambulance picked up Jamal and Muhammad together, but he did not film any of it. When Esther Schapira asked why not, he replied: "Because when the ambulance came it closed on them, you know?" When asked why he had not filmed the ambulance arriving and leaving, he replied that he had only one battery. Enderlin reportedly told the Paris Court of Appeal that Abu Rahma changed batteries at that point. Enderlin wrote in 2008, "footage filmed by a cameraman under fire is not the equivalent of a surveillance camera in a supermarket." Abu Rahma "filmed what circumstances permitted".

==== French reaction to the footage ====
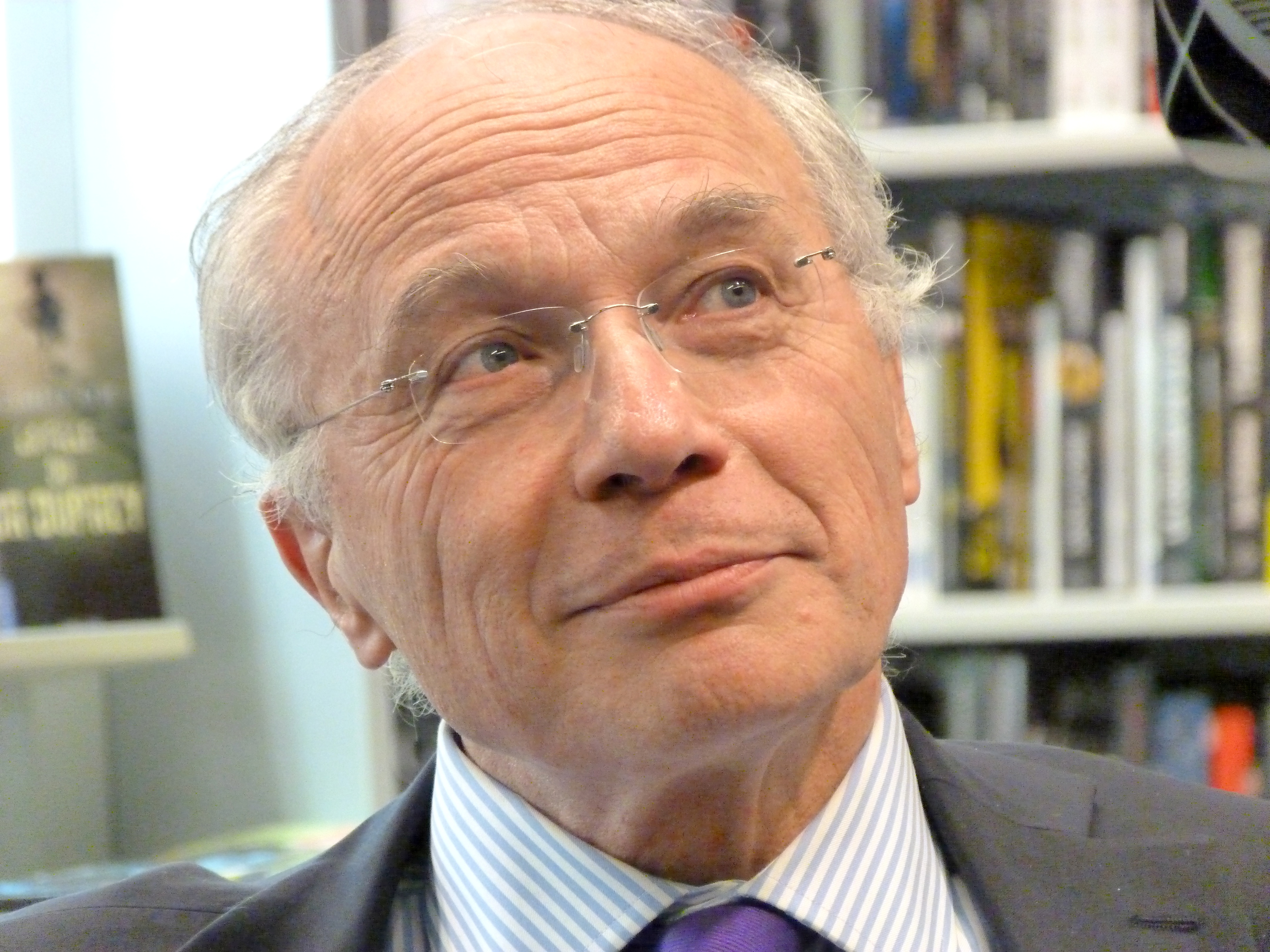
Denis Jeambar

In October 2004 France 2 allowed three French journalists to view the raw footage—Denis Jeambar, editor-in-chief of L'Express; Daniel Leconte, former France 2 correspondent and head of news documentaries at Arte, a state-run television network; and Luc Rosenzweig, former editor-in-chief of Le Monde. They also asked to speak to the cameraman, Abu Rahma, who was in Paris at the time, but France 2 apparently told them he did not speak French and that his English was not good enough.

Jeambar and Leconte wrote a report about the viewing for Le Figaro in January 2005. None of the scenes showed that the boy had died, they wrote. They rejected the position that the scene had been staged, but when Enderlin's voiceover said Muhammad was dead, Enderlin "had no possibility of determining that he was in fact dead, and even less so, that he had been shot by IDF soldiers". They said the footage did not show the boy's death throes: "This famous 'agonie' that Enderlin insisted was cut from the montage does not exist."

Several minutes of the film showed Palestinians playing at war for the cameras, they wrote, falling down as if wounded, then getting up and walking away. Jeambar and Leconte concluded that the shots had come from the Palestinian positions, given the trajectory of the bullets.

The idea of writing about the raw footage had been Luc Rosenzweig's; he had initially offered a story about it to L'Express, which is how Jeambar (editor of L'Express) had become involved. But Jeambar and Leconte ended up distancing themselves from Rosenzweig. He was involved with the Israeli-French Metula News Agency (known as Mena), which was pushing the view that the scene was a fake. Rosenzweig later called it "an almost perfect media crime". When Jeambar and Leconte wrote up their report about the raw footage, they initially offered it to Le Monde, not Le Figaro, but Le Monde refused to publish it because Mena had been involved at an earlier stage. Jeambar and Leconte made clear in Le Figaro that they gave no credence to the staging hypothesis:

To those who, like Mena, tried to use us to support the theory that the child's death was staged by the Palestinians, we say they are misleading us and their readers. Not only do we not share that point of view, but we attest that, given our present knowledge of the case, nothing supports that conclusion. In fact, the reverse is true." (Note: Denis Jeambar and Daniel Leconte, Le Figaro, January 2005: "A ceux qui, comme la Mena, ont voulu nous instrumentaliser pour étayer la thèse de la mise en scène de la mort de l'enfant par des Palestiniens, nous disons qu'ils nous trompent et qu'ils trompent leurs lecteurs. Non seulement nous ne partageons pas ce point de vue, mais nous affirmons qu'en l'état actuel de notre connaissance du dossier, rien ne permet de l'affirmer, bien au contraire.")

==== Enderlin's response ====
Enderlin responded to Leconte and Jeambar in January 2005 in Le Figaro. He thanked them for rejecting that the scene had been staged. He had reported that the shots were fired by the Israelis because, he wrote, he trusted the cameraman, who had worked for France 2 since 1988. In the days following the shooting, other witnesses, including other journalists, offered some confirmation, he said. He added that the Israeli army had not responded to France 2's offers to cooperate with their investigation.

Another reason he had attributed the shooting to Israel, he wrote, was, "the image corresponded to the reality of the situation not only in Gaza but also in the West Bank." Citing Ben Kaspi in the Israeli newspaper Maariv, he wrote that, during the first months of the Second Intifada, the IDF had fired one million rounds of ammunition—700,000 in the West Bank and 300,000 in Gaza; from 29 September to late October 2000, 118 Palestinians had been killed, including 33 under the age of 18, compared to 11 adult Israelis killed during the same period.

=== Confusion about timeline ===
Confusion arose about the timeline. Abu Rahma said the shooting began at noon and continued for 45 minutes. Jamal's account matched his: he and Muhammad arrived at the junction around noon, and were under fire for 45 minutes.

Enderlin's France 2 report placed the shooting later in the day. His voiceover said that Jamal and Muhammad were shot around 3:00 pm local time (GMT+3). (Note: Israel Summer Time, which ended that year on 6 October, is three hours ahead of GMT.) James Fallows agreed that Jamal and Muhammad first made an appearance in the footage around 3:00 pm, judging by comments from Jamal and some journalists on the scene. Abu Rahma said he remained at the junction for 30–40 minutes after the shooting. According to Schapira, he left for his studio in Gaza at around 4 pm, where he sent the footage to Enderlin in Jerusalem at around 6 pm. The news first arrived in London from the Associated Press at 6:00 pm BST (GMT+1), followed minutes later by a similar report from Reuters.

Contradicting the noon and 3 pm timelines, Mohammed Tawil, the doctor who admitted Muhammad to the Al-Shifa Hospital in Gaza City, told Esther Schapira that the boy had been admitted around 10:00 am local time, along with the ambulance driver, who had been shot through the heart. Tawil later said that he could not recall what he had told reporters about this. Records from the Al-Shifa Hospital reportedly show that a young boy was examined in the pathology department at midday. The pathologist, Dr. Abed El-Razeq El Masry, examined him for half an hour. He told Schapira that the boy's abdominal organs were lying outside his body, and he showed Schapira images of the body, with a card identifying the boy as Muhammad. A watch on a pathologist's wrist in one of the images appeared to say 3:50.

=== Interview with soldiers ===
In 2002 Schapira interviewed three anonymous Israeli soldiers, "Ariel, Alexej and Idan", who said they had been on duty at the IDF post that day. They knew something was about to happen, one said, because of the camera crews that had gathered. One soldier said the live fire started from the high-rise Palestinian blocks known as "the twins"; the shooter was firing at the IDF post, he said. The soldier added that he had not seen the al-Durrahs. The Israelis returned fire on a Palestinian station 30 metres to the left of the al-Durrahs. Their weapons were equipped with optics that allowed them to fire accurately, according to the soldier, and none of them had switched to automatic fire. In the view of the soldier, the shooting of Jamal and Muhammad was no accident. The shots did not come from the Israeli position, he said.

=== Father's injuries ===
In 2007 Yehuda David, a hand surgeon at Tel Hashomer Hospital, told Israel's Channel 10 that he had treated Jamal Al-Durrah in 1994 for knife and axe wounds to his arms and legs, injuries sustained during a gang attack. David maintained that the scars Jamal had presented as bullet wounds were in fact scars from a tendon-repair operation David had performed in the early 90s. (Note: Larry Defner, +972 Magazine, 22 May 2013: "Another familiar 'proof' of the hoax cited by the Kuperwasser Committee is that 'the injuries and scars presented by Jamal [al-Dura, Muhammad's father] as having been inflicted during the incident were actually the result of his having been assaulted in 1992 by Palestinians wielding knives and axes ...' This revelation was supplied by Dr. Yehuda David, a hand surgeon at Israel's Tel Hashomer hospital who treated Jamal for those earlier injuries in 1994. His statement to the committee says the Jordanian hospital medical reports on Jamal 'support my assertion that the paralysis of Mr. Al-Durrah's right hand was not a result of an injury allegedly suffered at the Netzarim junction several days before, as he claimed, but had been caused by the earlier injuries which I had treated in 1994.'") When David repeated his allegations in an interview with a "Daniel Vavinsky", published in 2008 in Actualité Juive in Paris, Jamal filed a complaint with the Tribunal de grande instance de Paris for defamation and breach of doctor-patient confidentiality.

The court established that "Daniel Vavinsky" was a pseudonym for Clément Weill-Raynal, a deputy editor at France 3. In 2011 it ruled that David and Actualité Juive had defamed Jamal. David, Weill-Raynal and Serge Benattar, the managing editor of Actualité Juive, were fined €5,000 each, and Actualité Juive was ordered to print a retraction. The Israeli government said it would fund David's appeal. The appeal was upheld in 2012; David was acquitted of defamation and breach of confidentiality. Benjamin Netanyahu, Israeli's prime minister, telephoned David to congratulate him. Jamal Al-Durrah said he would appeal the court's decision.

In 2012 Rafi Walden, deputy director of the Tel Hashomer hospital and board member of Physicians for Human Rights, wrote in Haaretz that he had received Jamal's 50-page medical file from Amman's King Hussein Hospital and examined it. The file shows the injuries from the 2000 shooting were "completely different wounds" from the 1994 injuries. The medical files showed "a gunshot wound in the right wrist, a shattered forearm bone, multiple fragment wounds in a palm, gunshot wounds in the right thigh, a fractured pelvis, an exit wound in the buttocks, a tear in the main nerve of the right thigh, tears in the main groin arteries and veins, and two gunshot wounds in the left lower leg." The medical reports corroborated this diagnosis with photographs, x-rays, surgery reports, and expert consultation reports.

== Israel's inquiries ==
=== 2000: Shahaf report ===
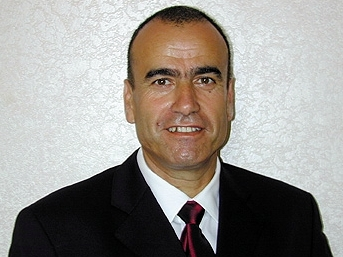
Major General Yom Tov Samia

Major General Yom Tov Samia, the IDF's southern commander, set up an inquiry soon after the shooting. According to James Fallows, Israeli commentators questioned its legitimacy as soon as it started; Haaretz called it "almost a pirate endeavour". The team was led by Nahum Shahaf, a physicist, and Joseph Doriel, an engineer, both of whom had been involved in the Yitzhak Rabin assassination conspiracy theories. Other investigators included Meir Danino, chief scientist at Elisra Systems; Bernie Schechter, a ballistics expert, formerly with the Israeli police's criminal identification laboratory; and Chief Superintendent Elliot Springer, also from the criminal identification lab. A full list of names was never released.

Shahaf and Doriel built models of the wall, concrete drum and IDF post, and tried to reenact the shooting. A mark on the drum from the Israeli Bureau of Standards allowed them to determine its size and composition. They concluded that the shots may have come from a position behind Abu Rahma, where Palestinian police were alleged to have been standing.

On 23 October 2000, Shahaf and Doriel invited CBS 60 Minutes to film the reenactment. Doriel told the correspondent, Bob Simon, that he believed the boy's death was real, but that it had been staged to damage Israel. Doriel said the actors in this staged incident included the Palestinian gunmen, the cameraman Abu Rahma and even the boy's own father "who apparently didn't understand that the act would end in the murder of his son". When General Samia heard about the interview, he removed Doriel from the investigation.

The investigators' report was shown to the head of Israeli military intelligence and the key points were published in November 2000. The investigation concluded that while it is possible that Muhammad had been killed by the IDF, it was also "quite plausible" that he had been hit by Palestinian bullets aimed at the IDF post. The report did not include Doriel's allegation that the Palestinians had staged the entire incident. The inquiry provoked widespread criticism. A Haaretz editorial said, "it is hard to describe in mild terms the stupidity of this bizarre investigation."

==== Palestinian criticism ====
The reports conclusions were criticized by the Palestinians. Palestinians pointed out that the Israeli army had destroyed most of the physical evidence, including the wall behind the Durrahs that contained the bullet holes, saying it needed to remove hiding places for Palestinian gunmen. Cameraman Talal Abu Rahma said that there had been a period of intense gunfire exchange between the IDF and Palestinian militants, followed by a period in which only the IDF was firing, and that Muhammad was killed during this latter period. Palestinians also criticized the report for concluding that Muhammad had been shot in the back; doctors in Al-Shifa Hospital had concluded that Muhammad had been shot in the abdomen and the back wound was an exit injury.

An investigation by the Palestinian Authority ruled out the possibility that Muhammad was killed by Palestinian fire. Major General Abdel-Razek al-Majaydeh said Muhammad was not shot from behind and the Palestinian investigation concluded the bullets came from the Israeli post.

=== 2005: Retraction of earlier position ===
In 2005 Major-General Giora Eiland publicly retracted the IDF's admission of responsibility, and a statement to that effect was approved by the prime minister's office in September 2007. The following year an IDF spokesman, Col. Shlomi Am-Shalom, said that the Shahaf report had shown the IDF could not have shot Muhammad. He asked France 2 to send the IDF the unedited 27 minutes of raw footage, as well as footage Abu Rahma shot the following day.

=== 2013: Kuperwasser report ===
Israel says my son isn't dead...He's not dead? Then bring him to me.

— Muhammad al-Durrah's father

In September 2012 the Israeli government set up another inquiry at the request of Prime Minister Benjamin Netanyahu, led by Yossi Kuperwasser, director-general of the Strategic Affairs Ministry. In May 2013 it published a 44-page report concluding that the al-Durrahs had not been hit by IDF fire and may not have been shot at all. Muhammad al-Durrah's father strongly challenged Israel's claim that his son was somehow still alive and offered to have his son's grave exhumed for DNA analysis.

While Netanyahu called the report's conclusions "the truth", the report was criticized by Reporters Without Borders and Israeli journalist Barak Ravid.

==== Report's conclusions ====
The Kuperwasser report said that France 2's central claims were not substantiated by the material the station had in its possession at the time; that the boy was alive at the end of the video; that there was no evidence that Jamal or Muhammad were injured in the manner reported by France 2 or that Jamal was seriously injured; and that they may not have been shot at all. The report claimed that the body at Muhammad's funeral was different from the boy behind the barrel in France 2's footage.

The Kuperwasser did not contact Muhammad al-Durrah's father during the course of the investigation. Nor did it contact cameraman Abu Rahma or Enderlin – both witnesses to the shooting. It included a medical opinion from Yehuda David, the doctor who treated Jamal in 1994. The report said it is "highly doubtful that bullet holes in the vicinity of the two could have had their source in fire from the Israeli position", and that the France 2 report was "edited and narrated in such a way as to create the misleading impression that it substantiated the claims made therein". The France 2 narrative relied entirely on Abu Rahma's testimony, the report said. Yuval Steinitz, Minister of International Affairs, Strategy and Intelligence, called the affair a "modern-day blood libel against the State of Israel".

==== Criticism of the report ====
France 2, Charles Enderlin and Jamal al-Durrah rejected the report's conclusions and said they would cooperate with an independent international investigation. France 2 and Enderlin asked the Israeli government to supply the commission's letter of appointment, membership and evidence, including photographs and the names of witnesses. Enderlin said the commission had failed to speak to him, France 2, al-Durrah or other eyewitnesses, and had consulted no independent experts. According to Enderlin, France 2 stood ready to help al-Durrah have his son's body exhumed; he and al-Durrah said they were willing to take polygraph tests.

American-Israeli journalist Larry Derfner questioned the report's conclusions of a coverup:

[If] it was all a hoax, how many people would have to be covering it up all this time? Start with the al-Dura family, then the people near the scene of the shooting, at least some of the people at the funeral, plus doctors and nurses at the Gaza hospital and the Amman hospital, plus the Jordanian ambassador to Israel who brought Jamal al-Dura to Amman for treatment...Each and every one of them would have had to keep this incredible secret for 13 years. Yet with all the legions of Palestinian collaborators Israel has managed to conscript over the years despite the danger to their lives, not one Palestinian has ever been found to corroborate the al-Dura conspiracy theory.

Israeli journalist Barak Ravid called it "probably one of the least convincing documents produced by the Israeli government in recent years".

== Philippe Karsenty litigation ==
=== 2006: Enderlin-France 2 v. Karsenty ===
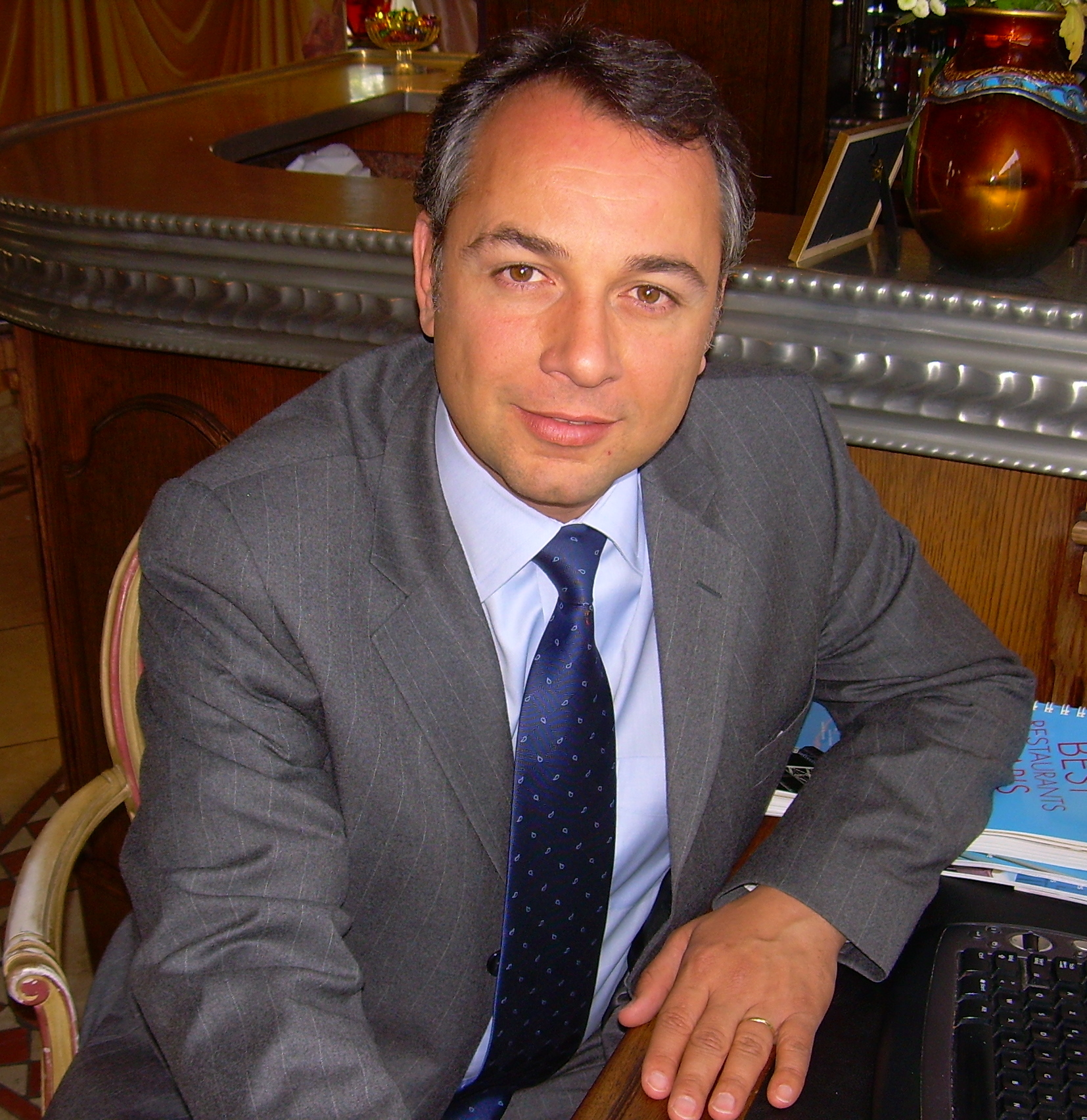
Philippe Karsenty was convicted of defamation.

In response to claims that it had broadcast a staged scene, Enderlin and France 2 filed three defamation suits in 2004 and 2005, seeking symbolic damages of €1. The most notable lawsuit was against Philippe Karsenty, who ran a media watchdog, Media-Ratings. (Note: A second case, against Pierre Lurçat of the Jewish Defense League, was dismissed on a technicality. A third, against Dr. Charles Gouz, whose blog republished an article in which France 2 was criticized, resulted in a "mitigated judgement" against Gouz for his posting of the word "désinformation".) France 2 and Enderlin issued a writ two days later.

The case began in September 2006. Enderlin submitted as evidence a February 2004 letter from Jacques Chirac, then president of France, which spoke of Enderlin's integrity. The court upheld the complaint on 19 October 2006, fining Karsenty €1,000 and ordering him to pay €3,000 in costs. He lodged an appeal that day.

=== 2007: Karsenty v. Enderlin-France 2 ===
The first appeal opened in September 2007 in the Court of Appeal of Paris, before a three-judge panel led by Judge Laurence Trébucq. The court asked France 2 to turn over the 27 minutes of raw footage Abu Rahma said he had shot, to be shown during a public hearing. France 2 produced 18 minutes; Enderlin said that only 18 minutes had been shot.

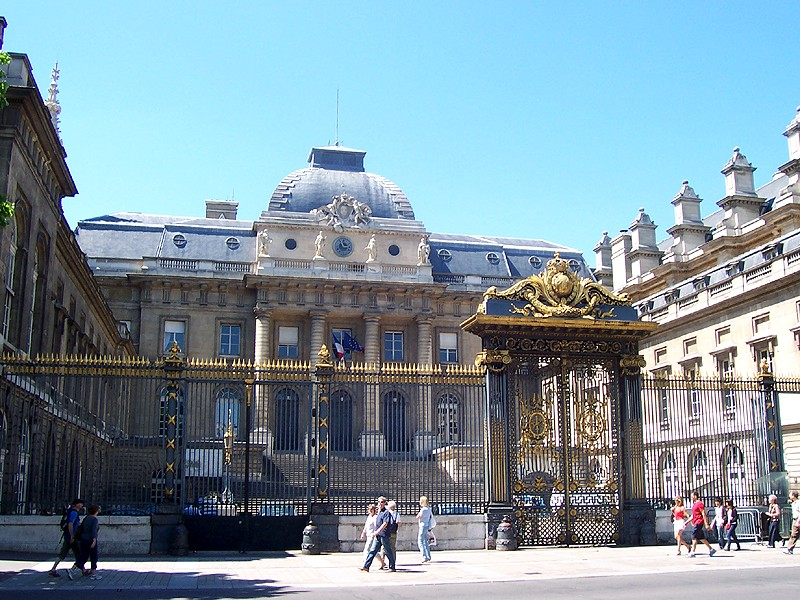
The appeal was heard in the Palais de Justice.

During the screening, the court heard that Muhammad had raised his hand to his forehead and moved his leg after Abu Rahma had said he was dead, and that there was no blood on his shirt. Enderlin argued that Abu Rahma had not said the boy was dead, but that he was dying. A report prepared for the court by Jean-Claude Schlinger, a ballistics expert commissioned by Karsenty, said that had the shots come from the Israeli position, Muhammad would have been hit in the lower limbs only.

France 2's lawyer, Francis Szpiner, counsel to former President of France Jacques Chirac, called Karsenty "the Jew who pays a second Jew to pay a third Jew to fight to the last drop of Israeli blood", comparing him to 9/11 conspiracy theorist Thierry Meyssan and Holocaust denier Robert Faurisson. Karsenty had it in for Enderlin, Szpiner argued, because of Enderlin's even-handed coverage of the Middle East.

The judges overturned the ruling against Karsenty in May 2008 in a 13-page decision. They ruled that he had exercised in good faith his right to criticize and had shown the court a "coherent body of evidence". The court noted inconsistencies in Enderlin's statements and said that Abu Rahma's statements were not "perfectly credible either in form or content". There were calls for a public inquiry from historian Élie Barnavi, a former Israeli ambassador to France, and Richard Prasquier, president of the Conseil Représentatif des Institutions juives de France. The left-leaning Le Nouvel Observateur began a petition in support of Enderlin that was signed by 300 French writers, accusing Karsenty of a seven-year smear campaign.

=== 2013: Defamation ruling ===
France 2 appealed to the Court of Cassation (supreme court). In February 2012 it quashed the decision of the appeal court to overturn the conviction, ruling that the court should not have asked France 2 to provide the raw footage. The case was sent back to the appeal court, which convicted Karsenty of defamation in 2013 and fined him €7,000.

== Impact of the footage ==
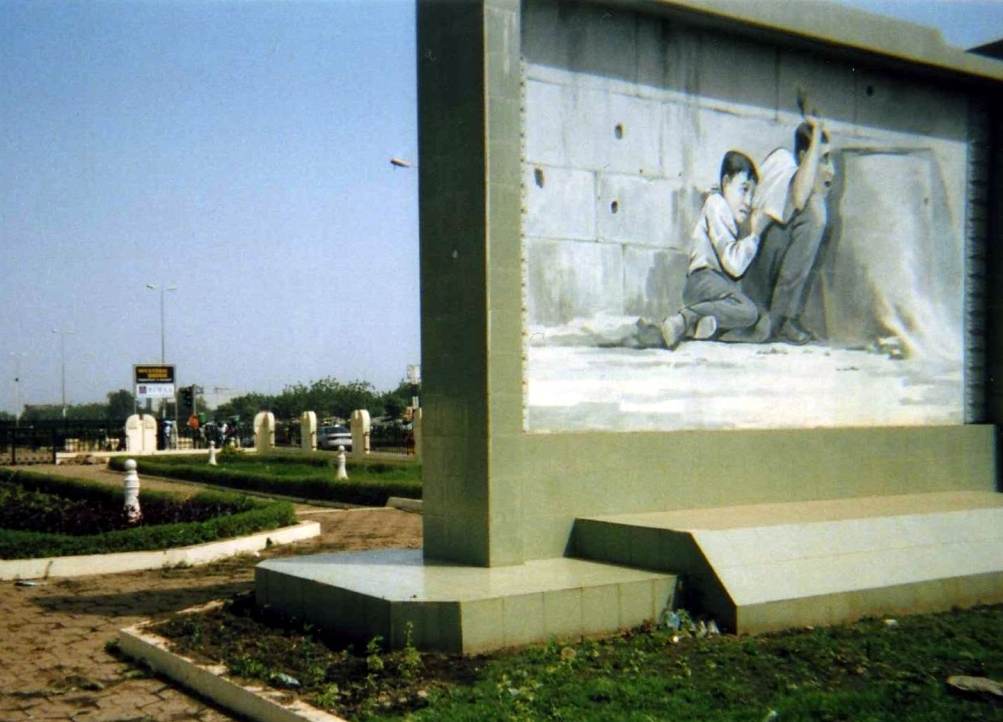
Place de l'enfant martyr de Palestine, Bamako, Mali

The footage of Muhammad was compared to other iconic images of children under attack: the boy in the Warsaw ghetto (1943), the Vietnamese girl doused with napalm (1972), and the firefighter carrying the dying baby in Oklahoma (1995). Catherine Nay, a French journalist, argued that Muhammad's death "cancels, erases that of the Jewish child, his hands in the air before the SS in the Warsaw Ghetto".

Palestinian children were distressed by the repeated broadcasting of the footage, according to a therapist in Gaza, and were re-enacting the scene in playgrounds. Arab countries issued postage stamps bearing the images. Parks and streets were named in Muhammad's honour, and Osama bin Laden mentioned him in a "warning" to President George Bush after 9/11. The images were blamed for the 2000 Ramallah lynching and a rise in antisemitism in France. One image could be seen in the background when journalist Daniel Pearl, an American Jew, was beheaded by al-Qaeda in February 2002.

Sections of the Jewish and Israeli communities, including the Israeli government in 2013, described the statements that IDF soldiers had killed the boy as a "blood libel", a reference to the centuries-old allegation that Jews sacrifice Christian children for their blood. Comparisons were made with the Dreyfus affair of 1894, when a French-Jewish army captain was found guilty of treason based on a forgery. In the view of Charles Enderlin, the controversy is a smear campaign intended to undermine footage coming out of the occupied Palestinian territories. Doreen Carvjal wrote in The New York Times that the footage is "a cultural prism, with viewers seeing what they want to see". The footage of al-Durrah's death re-emerged in political discourse during the Gaza war after his siblings were killed by Israeli soldiers in Gaza.
