= Moutet =

Moutet is a French surname. Notable people with the surname include:

- Corentin Moutet (born 1999), French tennis player
- Marius Moutet (1876–1968), French Socialist politician and Minister for Colonies
- Anne-Elisabeth Moutet (born 1965), French-British journalist and author
