= Enderlin =

Enderlin can refer to:

- Charles Enderlin (1945– ), French-Israeli journalist
- Karl Enderlin (1923–2004), Swiss figure skater
- Richard Enderlin (1843–1930), musician and United States Army soldier
- Enderlin, North Dakota
- 2025 Enderlin tornado, an EF5 Tornado that occurred in Enderlin, North Dakota
