= Book World =

Book World or Bookworld may refer to:

- "Book World", a defunct Chicago Tribune entertainment section
- "Book World", The Washington Post entertainment section established in 1972
- B.C. BookWorld, a British Columbia, Canada-based quarterly newspaper
- Book World, Inc., the parent company of the Blue Star Productions book publishing imprint
- Jewish Book World, a publication of the Jewish Book Council
- Bookworld, a Queensland, Australian bookstore chain that merged with Angus & Robertson in the 1990s
- BookWorld, a fictitious and complex environment that acts as a "behind-the-scenes" area of books, created by Jasper Fforde in his Thursday Next series

== See also ==
- The book publishing industry
