= Shahaf (disambiguation) =

Shahaf is a Hebrew surname.

Shahaf or Shachaf, literally meaning "seagull", may also refer to:

- 869th Battalion, Field Intelligence Battalion "Shahaf"
- Alternative name of Rosh HaNikra Islands
- "Shahaf" ("Seagull"), nickname of IAI Seascan, Israeli patrol airplane based on IAI Westwind
