= Shahaf =

Hebrew surname

Shahaf (Hebrew: שחף) is a Hebrew surname literally meaning "seagull". Notable people with the surname include:

- Arava Shahaf
- Avner Shahaf
- Catherine Margaret Shachaf, a biologist
- Elad Shahaf
- Maayan Furman-Shahaf
- Nahum Shahaf, an Israeli physicist
- Orit Shahaf, Israeli singer from HaYehudim
