= Charles Enderlin =

French-Israeli journalist & author (born 1945)

- צ'רלס אנדרלין
- Born: 1945 (age 80–81); Paris, France
- Occupations: Journalist, bureau chief in Israel for France 2
- Spouse: Danièle Kriegel
- Awards: Legion of Honour, August 2009
- Website: Enderlin's blog at France 2, and since 2015 personal Enderlin's blog

Charles Enderlin (Hebrew: צ'רלס אנדרלין; born 1945) is a French-Israeli journalist, specialising in the Middle East and Israel. He is the author of a number of books on the subject, including Shamir (1991), a biography of Yitzhak Shamir, Shattered Dreams: The Failure of the Peace Process in the Middle East, 1995–2002 (2002), and The Lost Years: Radical Islam, Intifada and Wars in the Middle East 2001–2006 (2007). He was awarded France's highest decoration, the Legion of Honour, in August 2009.

Enderlin came to international public attention in September 2000, when he provided the voice-over for a France 2 report on the killing of 12-year-old boy Muhammad al-Durrah by soldiers of the Israeli army. The event was important at the start of the Second Intifada. A few months after Enderlin's report, a small group of people in France (Gérard Huber, Philippe Karsenty, Luc Rosenzweig) contested the origin of the bullets that killed al-Durrah and alleged that the scene was staged. France 2 sued Karsenty for libel. Karsenty was eventually convicted of defamation in 2013 and fined €7,000.

== Biography ==
Enderlin was born in Paris in 1945, and grew up in Metz with his divorced mother, his sister, and his grandparents, a family of Austrian Jews who moved to France after the Anschluss. He studied medicine in Nancy, and moved to Israel in December 1968 at the age of 22 to live on a kibbutz.

In 1971, he became a journalist with an Israeli radio station. Two years later, he became correspondent of Radio Monte Carlo, and the next year, senior editor at the news department of Kol Yisrael. At the beginning of the 1970s, he acquired Israeli citizenship.

In 1981, he became a correspondent with the French television channel Antenne 2 (now France 2), acquiring the title of grand reporter in 1988 ("grand reporter" is a senior title in the French media). Three years later, he became chief of the Israel bureau of France 2. As of 2005, he was also vice-president of the Association of Foreign Press Correspondents in Jerusalem.

He has studied and written extensively on the political and diplomatic process of normalisation between Israel and the Palestinian Authority, and wrote an overview of the negotiations in 1997, published as Paix ou guerre, les secrets des négociations israélo-arabes 1917–1997 ("Peace or War, the Secrets of Israeli–Palestinian Negotiations, 1917–1997").

He was awarded the Chevalier de l'Ordre national de la Légion d'honneur on 12 August 2009.

In August 2015, he retired from his post in the Jerusalem office, and was replaced by Franck Genauzeau.

== Muhammad al-Durrah reportage and lawsuits ==
In September 2000, footage of the reported shooting in the Gaza Strip of a Palestinian boy, Muhammad al-Durrah, was broadcast by France 2. Narrating the footage, Enderlin stated that al-Durrah had been targeted and killed by shots fired from Israeli positions. He came under criticism from a number of commentators, including Philippe Karsenty, who claimed that the bullets that killed the boy were not fired by the Israeli army, and that Enderlin had helped stage the scene. France 2 sued Karsenty for libel. Karsenty was eventually convicted of defamation in 2013 and fined €7,000.

== Books ==
- Shamir (Orban, 1991)
- Paix ou guerres : les secrets des négociations israélo-arabes, 1917–1997 (Stock, 1997)
- Le Rêve brisé : histoire de l'échec du processus de paix au Proche-Orient, 1995–2002 (Fayard, 2002)
  English translation: Shattered Dreams: The Failure of the Peace Process in the Middle East, 1995–2002, translated by Susan Fairfield (Other Press, 2003)
- Les Années perdues : Intifada et guerres au Proche-Orient, 2001–2006 (Fayard, 2006)
  English translation: The Lost Years: Radical Islam, Intifada and Wars in the Middle East, 2001–2006, translated by Suzanne Verderber (Other Press, 2007)
- Par le feu et par le sang : le combat clandestin pour l'indépendance d'Israël, 1936–1948 (Albin Michel, 2008)
- Le Grand Aveuglement : Israël et l'irrésistible ascension de l'islam radical (Albin Michel, 2009)
- Un enfant est mort : Netzarim, 30 septembre 2000 (Don Quichotte, 2010)
- Au nom du Temple : Israël et l'irrésistible ascension du messianisme juif, 1967–2013 (Seuil, 2013)
  Updated and expanded edition: Au nom du Temple : Israël et l'arrivée au pouvoir des juifs messianiques (Points, 2023)
- Les Juifs de France entre République et sionisme (Seuil, 2020)
- De notre correspondant à Jérusalem : le journalisme comme identité (Don Quichotte / Seuil, 2021)
- Israël : l'agonie d'une démocratie (Seuil, 2023)

== See also ==
- Camp David 2000 Summit
- Israeli–Palestinian conflict
- Pallywood
- History of the State of Palestine
- Dominique Vidal
