= Shamgar Commission =

Official Commission of Inquiry set up to investigate the assassination of Yitzhak Rabin

The Shamgar commission was the official Commission of Inquiry set up to investigate the assassination of Israeli Prime Minister Yitzhak Rabin in late 1995. Its objective was to investigate the chain of events leading up to the assassination, and the reaction of the organization responsible for the safety of the prime minister.

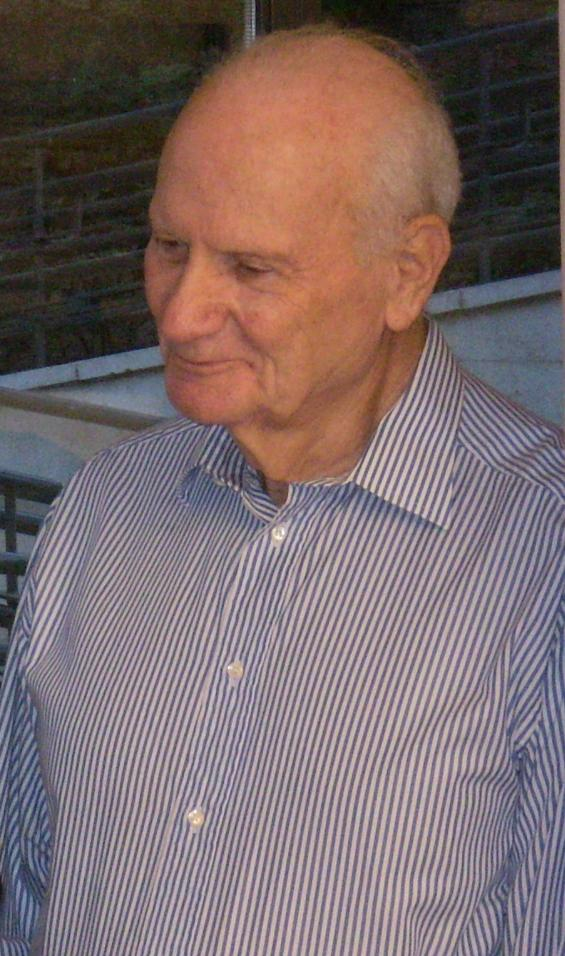
Meir Shamgar

The commission was chaired by President of the Supreme Court Meir Shamgar, and included Gen. (res.) Zvi Zamir and Prof. Ariel Rosen-Zvi.

Key figure of the General Security Services appeared in front of the commission, especially figure from the personal protection unit, police representatives, members of the prime ministers entourage that evening, doctors who cared for Rabin upon his arrival at the hospital, and the pathologist Dr. Yehuda Hiss, who determined the cause of death. The commission also received a video of the events.

The Shamgar commission held its first meeting on 19 November 1995, and submitted its findings on 28 March 1996, in a partially confidential report. The public report dealt with security arrangements that were in effect, division of labor between different security elements (GSS, police, Special Patrol Unit), a description of the incident scene, the assassination, evacuation, and medical treatment. The confidential parts of the report described the work of GSS agent Avishai Raviv, who was involved in gathering intelligence within right-wing elements in Israel.

== Shamgar report ==
The report determined that the assassination was made possible as a result of security failures at the scene, lack of coordination between various bodies responsible for security, non-adherence to instructions and procedures, leading to a lax security ring. It was critical of Shin Bet, Israel's internal security service, for exposing the Prime Minister to "serious risks", and for failing to act on threats to the prime minister's life by Jewish extremists.

=== The assassination ===
The report stated that on Saturday evening, 4 November 1995, the assassin, Yigal Amir, left his home in Herzliya and took the bus to Tel Aviv, where he waited in the parking area of the building where the rally Rabin was attending took place. He mostly leaned on the back of a gray GMC van, whose driver was in the vehicle, with the door opened, in a spot with a clear view of the stairs leading from the stage to the parking area, but also stood behind a large potted plant. At 21:45, Rabin and Shimon Peres started for their cars. Peres passed the assassin, and then Rabin and his entourage walked towards his car. The Prime Minister's security detail comprised five men, most of whom remained unnamed in the commission's report. As Rabin passed the plant near which the assassin was standing, he fired three shots; two of which hit Rabin, and a third which hit the head of the security detail, Yoram Rubin. Immediately after the first shot was fired, a member of the security detail, and a number of special patrol unit officers jumped on the assassin. The report stated that yells of "blank! blank!" were heard, but their source could not be identified.

=== The evacuation ===
The commission determined that after the shots were fired, the Prime Minister and Yoram Rubin were pushed into the car, and Rubin ordered the driver to leave. No one was sure if Rabin had been hit, and none of the medical personnel on site were consulted. After approximately 30 seconds, Rabin's head fell forward. Rubin tried to resuscitate him, unsuccessfully. The driver drove to Ichilov hospital via Arlozerov Street.

Upon reaching the hospital, the driver went to get a gurney, and he, Rubin, and a police officer laid the prime minister on it, and ran him to the trauma room.

According to the driver's estimate, they reached the hospital within a minute and a half. According to hospital records, they arrived at 21:52.

=== Medical treatment ===
The report included the testimony of Prof. Gabi Barbash, who stated that Rabin arrived at the emergency room with no pulse or vital signs, and resuscitatation began immediately. Barbash testified that the wound was made by a bullet that hit the back right shoulder, near the spine. The penetration area was the region where the ribs meet the spine. A vertebra was hit, and the doctors noticed damage, that could not be diagnosed, to the spinal cord itself.

The pathologist, Dr. Yehuda Hiss, determined that the cause of death was an injury to the lungs and spleen, bleeding. Hiss mentioned no injury to the spine.

=== Personal recriminations ===
The official report stated that Shin Bet Director, Carmi Gillon, carried responsibility for the security failures. Gillon, who resigned after the assassination, issued a public statement after the publication of the report which he ended by saying:

"I also salute my former colleagues, who have been so gravely—and in my opinion so unjustly—hurt by this official commission of inquiry."

Dror Yitzhaki, head of the GSS security branch resigned as well. Benny Lahav, head of the personal security unit was dismissed at the recommendation of the Shamgar commission.

== Criticism of the Shamgar commission ==
Proponents of a conspiracy theory do not accept the commission's findings.

After the report was published, an appeal was made to the Supreme Court to order the Minister of Health to open an inquiry into the evacuation of the prime minister and into the care he received when he reached the hospital. The court dismissed the appeal, stating that the inquiry had been covered by the Shamgar report, and that the appeal failed to introduce new evidence.

During November 1996 the government published some of the confidential sections of the report. These revealed that Shin Bet used a high-profile right wing militant as one of their agents. This led to claims that the agent, Avishai Raviv, was an agent provocateur. At one protest, he was filmed with a picture of Rabin in an SS uniform prior to Rabin's murder. He was known to have been on close terms with the assassin, with whom he had been heard discussing Rabin's rodef (outlaw to be killed) status.
