= Nahum Shahaf =

Israeli physicist

Nahum Shahaf (Hebrew: נחום שחף) is an Israeli physicist who specializes in ballistics and film technology.

== Biography ==
Nahum Shahaf earned a Master of Physics degree from Bar-Ilan University in 1977. Throughout most of the 1980s, he worked on unmanned aerial vehicles (UAVs) for the Israel Defense Forces (IDF), which Israeli journalist Amnon Lord described as placing Shahaf "among the leading developers" of the technology. According to his curriculum vitae, Shahaf worked primarily on UAV optical tracking systems, before shifting his focus to missile systems and inventing over the next decade. In 1997, he received an Israeli Ministry of Science award for creativity for his work on compressed digital video transmission.

== Al-Durrah investigation ==
Muhammad al-Durrah was a 12-year-old Palestinian boy, reported to have been shot and killed by Israel Defense Forces (IDF) gunfire on September 30, 2000. Shahaf, noticing what he considered an anomaly in the video footage of the shooting, contacted Major General Yom Tov Samia, head of the Israel's Southern Command. Shahaf proposed that he and Joseph Doriel, an engineer Shahaf had previously collaborated with on conspiracy theories surrounding the assassination of Yitzhak Rabin, should investigate the incident. Samia agreed, and on October 23, 2000, Shahaf helped arrange a re-enactment at an IDF shooting range, in front of a CBS 60 Minutes camera crew. In late November 2000, the investigators concluded, based on the angles and rate of fire, that Israeli troops had probably not shot the boy.

Israeli newspapers Haaretz and the Jerusalem Post claimed that Shahaf had no ballistics experience and Haaretz described the investigation as "dubious." His previous involvement in raising doubts about the identity of Rabin's killer became the subject of controversy. Shahaf, however, claims he spent months painstakingly collecting footage from reluctant cameramen and splicing the pieces together in rough temporal order to create an unbroken film of the day. Shahaf believes that al-Durrah was not killed by the IDF and may still be alive.
