= Barry Chamish =

Canadian writer (1952–2016)

- ברי חמיש
- Born: January 13, 1952; Winnipeg, Manitoba, Canada
- Died: August 23, 2016 (aged 64); Florida, U.S.
- Education: University of Manitoba
- Occupations: writer, public speaker

Barry Chamish (Hebrew: ברי חמיש; January 13, 1952 – August 23, 2016) was a Canadian-born Israeli writer and public speaker. He was best known for promoting conspiracy theories about the death of Yitzhak Rabin - Israel's prime minister who was assassinated in 1995.

== Early years ==
Barry Chamish was born in Winnipeg, Manitoba, Canada.

In the first half of the 1970s, Chamish had three novels and a book of short stories published in his native Canada. His novel Mack won a Canada Council Award worth several thousand dollars. In 1976, his book Alice in Newfoundland won a Manitoba Arts Council Award.

Chamish earned a Bachelor of Arts degree at the University of Manitoba in 1974. In 1975, Chamish emigrated to Israel, where he attended the Hebrew University of Jerusalem. He received a Master of Arts degree in 1979.

Following graduation, Chamish was conscripted into the Israel Defense Forces, and served as a regular from 1979 to 1981. He participated as a reservist in the 1982 Lebanon War, during which he operated a Redeye anti-aircraft missile.

== Career ==
Chamish began to work as a free-lance writer, publishing material in a range of publications including The Atlantic, National Review, and the New York Newsday. Chamish established a news service to distribute his work called "Profiles of Israel," which he continued throughout the decade of the 1980s.

During the 1990s, Chamish wrote extensively on UFOs Chamish's work was featured on four episodes of the NBC-TV program Sightings as well as a half-hour of primetime coverage on FOX-TV.

In the 1990s and 2000s, Chamish published a series of conspiracy books, including Traitors and Carpetbaggers in the Promised Land (1997), The Final Days of Israel (2000), Israel Betrayed (2001), and Bye Bye Gaza (2006). Chamish charged in these that an array of external and internal forces had "corrupted the country's leaders" and engaged in a "determined agenda aimed at the demise of the Jewish state."

In Who Murdered Yitzhak Rabin? Chamish claims that Rabin was not killed by a lone gunman and that he was shot three times—with the fatal wound being fired from the front. By the end of 2005, the book had sold 39,000 copies and had been published in seven different languages.

In 2008, the Jerusalem Magistrate Court summoned Chamish to pay Itamar Ben-Gvir, an Israeli far-right activist, defamation damages of 36,000 NIS (roughly US$10,000) after repeatedly calling him an agent of the Shin Bet intelligence service.

In the mid-2000s, Barry Chamish moved to the United States, last in Florida, where he continued writing and had a radio show on First Amendment Radio on Tuesday evenings. He died in his apartment in Florida in 2016.

== Scrabble ==
Chamish was the winner of the 1987 Israeli Scrabble Tournament and the runner-up in 1988.

== Books ==
- The Devil Wore an Angel's Suit. Winnipeg, MB: Split Level, 1972.
- Keep Stillman: A Pun. Winnipeg: Split Level, 1973.
- Mack. Winnipeg: Split Level, 1974.
- Alice in Newfoundland. Winnipeg: Split Level, 1976.
- The Fall of Israel. Edinburgh, Scotland: Canongate, 1992. ISBN 0-86241-355-9
- Traitors and Carpetbaggers in the Promised Land. Oklahoma City: Hearthstone, 1997. ISBN 1-57558-017-9
- Who Murdered Yitzhak Rabin? Venice, CA: Feral, 1998. ISBN 0-922915-50-4
- Return of the Giants. Sun Lakes, AZ: Book World/Blue Star, 2000. ISBN 1-881542-66-1
- The Final Days of Israel. Tempe, AZ: Dandelion, 2000. ISBN 1-893302-16-4
- Israel Betrayed. Ainsworth, NE: Counting Coup, 2001. ISBN 0-9708598-5-6
- Shabtai Tzvi, Labor Zionism and the Holocaust. Knoxville, TN: Master Press, 2005. ISBN 965-90766-1-4
- Bye Bye Gaza. Raleigh, NC: Lulu, 2006. ISBN 978-1-4457-1528-5
- With the Kennedys. Raleigh, NC: Lulu, 2006. ISBN 978-1-4457-1530-8
- THE conPromised Land. Raleigh, NC: Lulu, 2010. ISBN 978-1-4457-1258-1
- The Stinger, Not the Stung: Israel's Not So Civil War. Raleigh, NC: Lulu, 2012. ISBN 978-1300450825
