= Anne-Elisabeth Moutet =

French journalist, writer and columnist

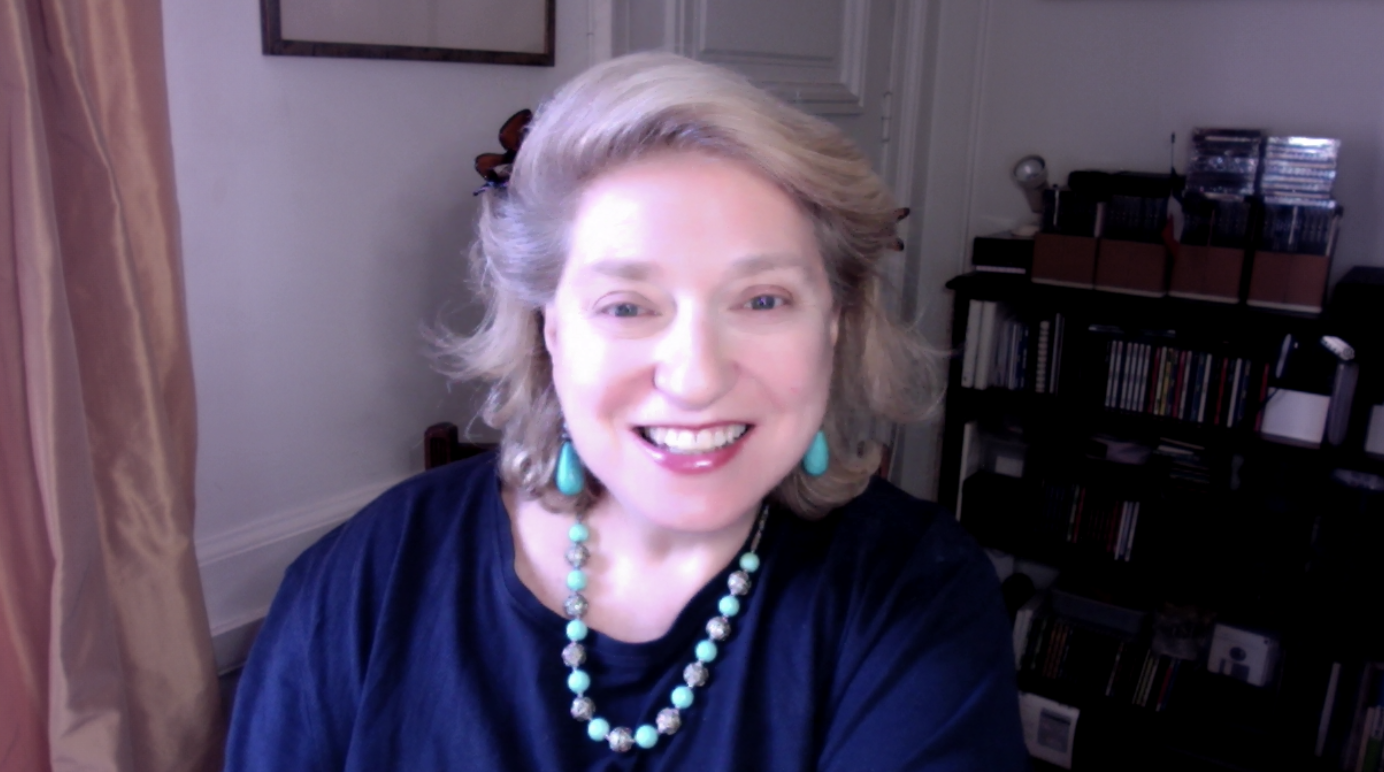

Anne-Elisabeth Moutet is a French journalist, writer and columnist. She writes for The Daily Telegraph in London particularly on international affairs, and for UnHerd. She is a regular commentator on the BBC, SKY News, Times Radio, BFMTV, Deutsche Welle, RTS, Radio Canada, ASharqNews, WION TV.

== Career ==
Born in Paris, she began her career at VSD under the editorship of Maurice Siégel and Jean Gorini, as a reporter, then a correspondent in the United States (1979–1981). She then joined France Soir, before joining the Sunday Times as a correspondent in Paris in 1983. She was Paris bureau chief for the Sunday Telegraph (London) from 1986 to 1989. After a stint at ELLE (French and British editions), she joined The European, as Paris bureau chief for the newspaper until 1998.

She joined The Daily Telegraph in 2007 as a columnist.

In an investigation of a controversy started in 2000 and still disputed today, she wrote that the France 2 State broadcaster correspondent Charles Enderlin's coverage of the Israeli–Palestinian conflict, particularly the killing of Muhammad al-Durrah, was respected by many journalists but regularly criticized by pro-Israel groups.

Contributions to other print media include:

- The Daily Telegraph
- The European
- The New York Post
- UnHerd

She has made television appearance for multiple channels, including:

- Arte
- BBC News
- LCI
- BFM TV
- SKY News
- France 24
- La Chaîne Info
- CGTN
- CNEWS
- Österreichischer Rundfunk
- Deutsche Welle
- WION

== Political positions ==
She is a critic of Salafism.

She wrote that under President of France Emmanuel Macron the French-German relationship has notably deteriorated.

In January 2018, she was a co-signatory of a column published in Le Monde entitled “We defend a freedom to annoy, essential to sexual freedom” of a group of 100 women including actress Catherine Deneuve.

== Personal life ==
She is the granddaughter of Member of Parliament and former Popular Front (1936–1938) minister Marius Moutet.
