= Kempler video =

Film overlooking the assassination of Yitzhak Rabin

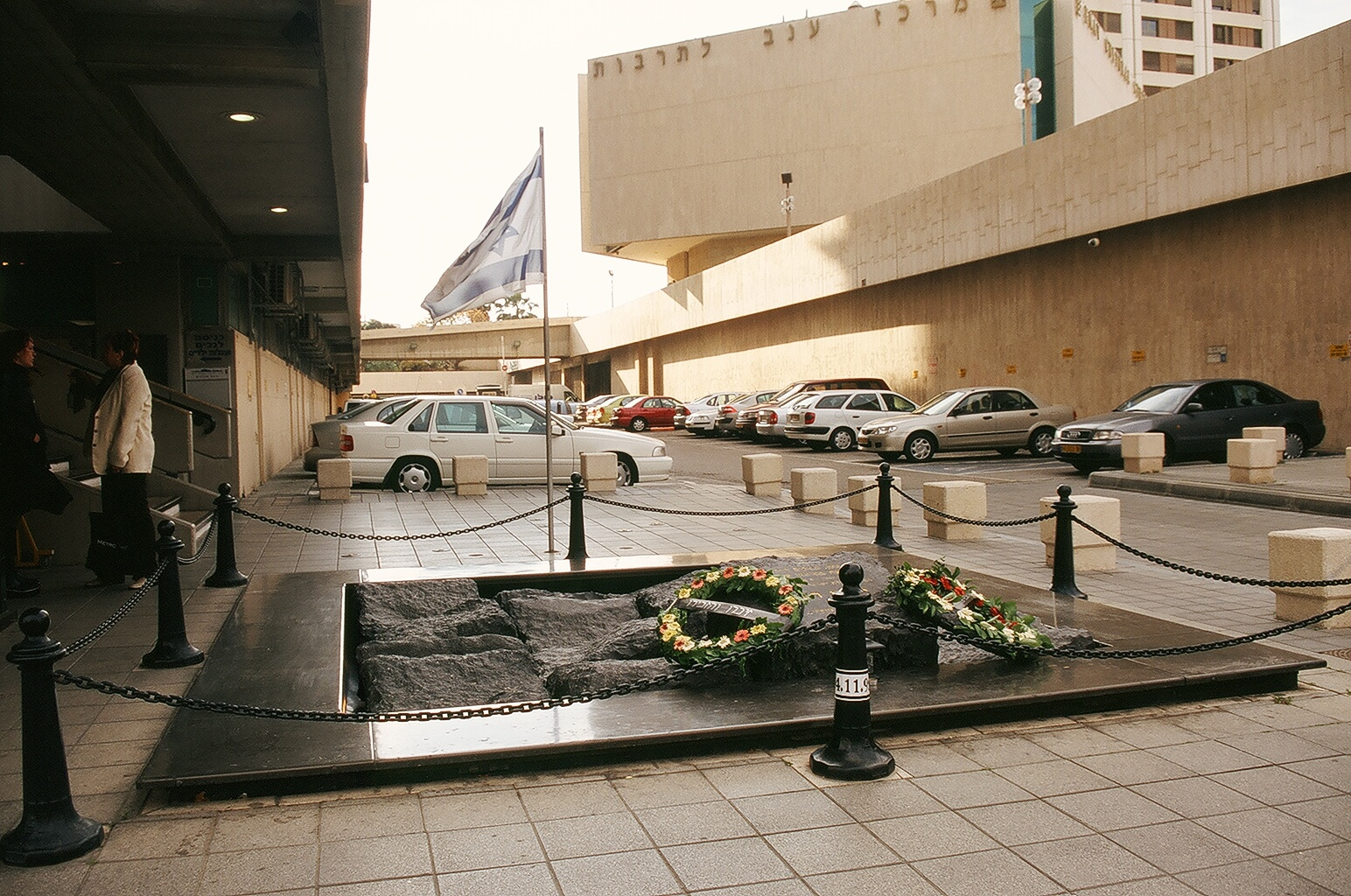
The monument marking the site of the assassination: Ibn Gabirol Street between the Tel Aviv City Hall and Gan Ha'ir. Kempler filmed the assassination from the top of the roof on the right

The Kempler video is a film made by Roni Kempler, an amateur photographer, who was present at the crime scene before and during the assassination of Prime Minister of Israel Yitzhak Rabin on November 4, 1995. He was standing on the northeast side of the Tel Aviv City Hall and later on the roof of the "Gan Ha'ir" (City Park) mall overlooking the spot where Rabin was killed.

== History ==
The filmmaker was Roni Kempler, by profession an accountant with the office of the State Comptroller of Israel who was also an amateur photographer; he frequently filmed events with his handheld video camera looking for special angles. Kempler's video has been described as "essentially the only video documentation of the killing".

The Kempler video shows Yigal Amir lounging about or sitting on a cement planter situated at the bottom of the stairs that officials participating in the rally in support of Yitzhak Rabin's policies would pass on their way back to their cars. At one point, Shimon Peres, the Foreign Minister, passed by Amir, greeting supporters. The video then shows Rabin descending a stairway and walking towards his car. Amir can be seen reaching for his gun, circling behind the Prime Minister and extending his arm, followed by a flash and three shots. The last image is of Rabin disappearing under a pile of security men to screams of horrified onlookers, after which Kempler stopped filming and hit the ground.

Immediately after the assassination, Kempler submitted the video to the Shamgar National Inquiry Commission, which was tasked with researching the security failures. Forty-five days after the Rabin assassination, and after the Shamgar commission granted permission to release the video to the public, Israeli TV showed the non-static parts of this video with commentary. The public was shocked by the ease of access that the assassin had, and by the security gaps. In his sole television appearance the night the video was broadcast, Kempler reflected on his thoughts and feelings during and after taking the video.

The Kempler video was shown three times on Israeli TV Channel 2 in late December 1995, after it acquired the rights and edited it for broadcasting. The video received international publicity and parts of it were shown in many countries. According to reports, Kempler received $350,000 from the Israeli News Company and Yedioth Ahronoth, a major newspaper in Israel, for the footage. This sum or most of it was recovered by selling the rights for broadcasting to other news agencies.

The Kempler video was used as evidence during the trial of Yigal Amir as well as by the independent judicial Shamgar commission. Partially based on the Kempler video, the Shamgar commission concluded that Amir was guilty and that Carmi Gillon, head of Shin Bet, should be removed from his position.

Proponents of the Yitzhak Rabin assassination conspiracy theories also make use of this video.

== See also ==
- Zapruder film, amateur film capturing the assassination of American president John F. Kennedy
- Pavel Hlava film, amateur video of the September 11 attacks notable for being the only recording to capture both strikes on the World Trade Center
