= Yitzhak Rabin assassination conspiracy theories =

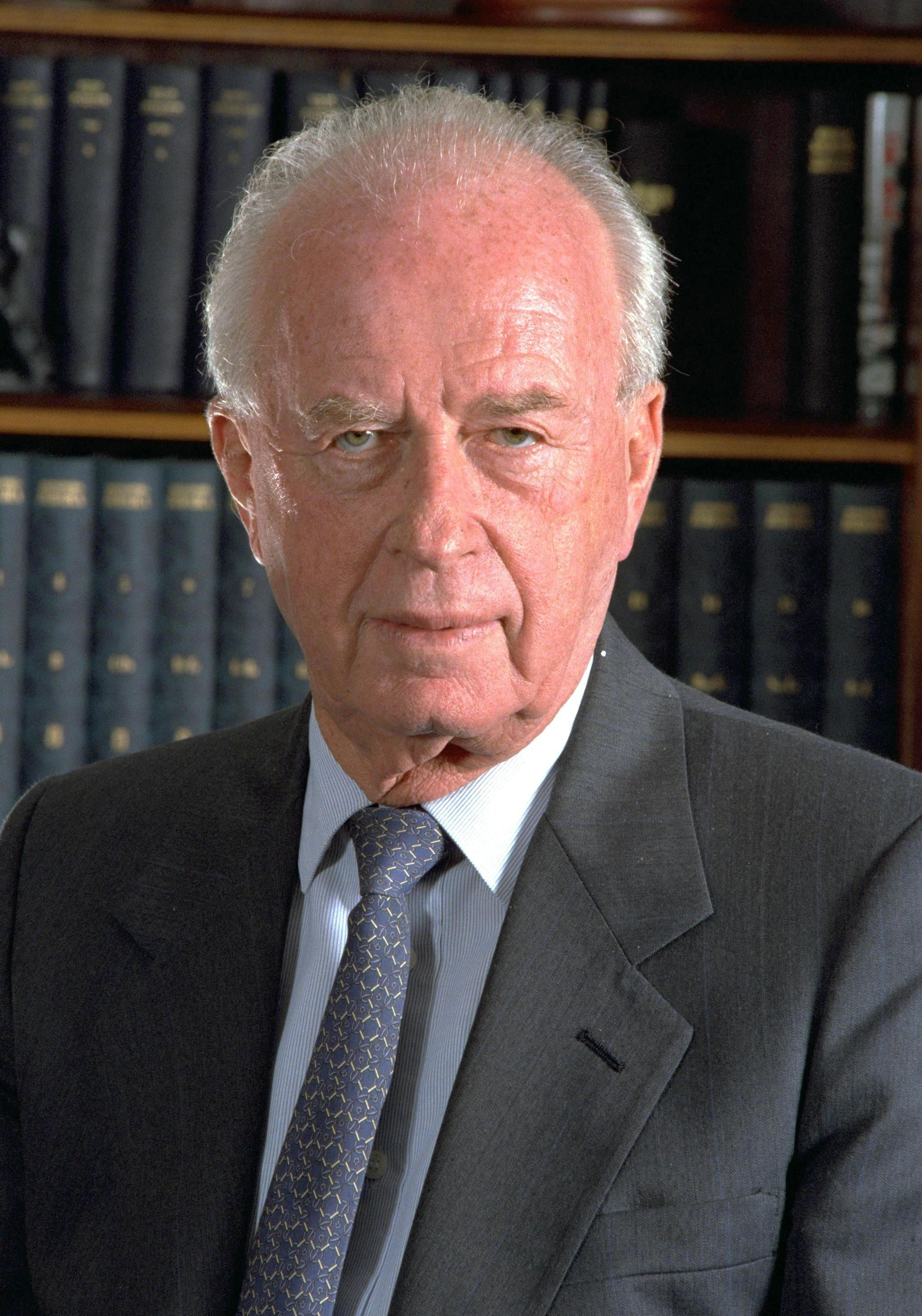
Yitzhak Rabin was an Israeli politician, statesman and general. He was the fifth Prime Minister of Israel

Conspiracy theories arose almost immediately following the assassination of Israeli Prime Minister Yitzhak Rabin on November 4, 1995. The perpetrator, Jewish Israeli law student Yigal Amir, was apprehended within seconds by people in the crowd. Rabin later died on the operating table at Ichilov Hospital. Amir confessed to the assassination of Rabin.

The assassination was reported as a clear-cut matter in Israeli media, and the Shamgar national inquiry commission and the court all drew the same conclusion that Amir was guilty of murder. Nevertheless, some inconsistencies in the evidence have been alleged, both in the medical records and in the inquiry testimony. These allegations and other suspicions have been included in occasional left-wing, and more prevalent right-wing conspiracy theories.

== Conspiracy claims ==
Conspiracy theorists have made some or all of the following claims, while others have opposed these conclusions.

- Police reports state that gunpowder was found on Rabin's body and clothing, suggesting that he had been shot at point-blank range, as gunpowder travels only a very short distance before dispersing. According to the official version, Amir shot from a distance at which no powder traces could have settled on Rabin's body and clothing.
- Surgery reports describe a bullet wound with the bullet entrance in the chest are inconsistent with the eyewitness reports and the Kempler video, which suggests that Rabin was shot in the back while walking away from Yigal Amir. Source of this provides link to a video in Hebrew and a written, inaccurate translation to English. Both versions, however, contain no hint that there was a chest entry wound, merely that there was a wound in the chest (can equally be an exit wound). Both versions report two gunshots rather than three.
- Rabin would have walked after Amir's shots in a manner inconsistent with gunshot, an impossibility if they shattered the vertebrae.
- Each medical record describes wounds which are "completely different" in nature to those concluded by the official Shamgar Commission. Medical descriptions of Rabin's condition are described as suddenly appearing to change.
- An anonymous physician who consulted Barry Chamish opined that "[t]he first two wounds, to the chest and abdomen occurred before Rabin's arrival. The third, frontal chest wound, had to have been inflicted after he entered the hospital," and that "it is inconceivable that Rabin had no spinal damage. The six members of the operating team were too skilled to have all been wrong about that."
- Three police officers who had been present testified that "when Yitzhak Rabin was placed in the car, he showed no visible wounds."
- Rabin's motorcade took 22 minutes to arrive at the hospital, even though he had a highly experienced chauffeur, and the streets were cordoned off. The distance between the crime scene and the hospital is a five-minute walk.
- Police ballistics tests on shell casings found at the scene did not match Amir's gun.
- No gunpowder residue was found on Amir's hands, clothing, or hair. Gunpowder residue would inevitably have been present if Amir had shot genuine bullets, as opposed to blanks.
- No blood was seen coming from Rabin at the scene, despite wounds to his lung and spleen, nor was any found later at that location. By contrast witnesses describe blood "gushing" from a chest wound upon arriving at hospital.
- Some witnesses stated that someone shouted, "It's nothing ... they're blanks. It's a toy gun."
- A Shin Bet agent testified that "I heard a policeman shout to people to calm down. The shot is a blank."
- Policeman Moshe Ephron stated: "The shots didn't sound natural. If they were real shots, they should have sounded much louder."
- Leah Rabin stated that a security guard told her immediately after the incident that the bullets shot at her husband were "blanks". She further stated that she was told by an Israeli security chief that she "should not worry as the whole thing had been staged."
- Amir, who was employed by the Shin Bet in Latvia about two years before the murder, commented at a court hearing, "If I were to tell the whole truth, the entire system would collapse. I know enough to destroy this country."
- Nahum Shahaf, an Israeli physicist who went on to play a major role in the Muhammad al-Durrah affair, has asserted that he had photographic evidence that the wrong man was being held for the assassination. He blamed the assassination on a conspiracy headed by Shimon Peres, who took over from Rabin as Prime Minister and later became the President of Israel.

== Criticism ==
There are three types of criticisms of the conspiracy theories. The most common type refutes and relativizes claims made in the conspiracy theories or by the conspiracy theorists and points out that the theories are detached from Israeli political culture, social relations and historic events. This criticism is not necessarily politically "coloured" and may refer to both right-wing and left-wing conspiracy theories. The other criticism focuses entirely on the more common, right-wing theories.

A second, mostly Israeli left-wing criticism, attacks the very existence of such theories as a denial of what they consider to be right-wing "responsibility" for the murder. This "responsibility" for the murder would have been by creating an extremely hostile environment for Rabin, in which Amir and his immediate accomplices Hagai Amir and Dror Adani were just a small group of the actors.

A third type of criticism, by right-wing activists, claims that the mostly Israeli right-wing conspiracy supporters embarrassed the Israeli right by supporting fringe theories for which no evidence exists. The conspiracy theorists, according to this criticism, move the debate away from the responsibility of what they call the "perpetrators of the Oslo crimes". These right-wing critics conclude that right-wing conspiracy theorists ultimately serve the goals of the Israeli left.

== See also ==
- Kempler video
- John F. Kennedy assassination conspiracy theories

== Books ==
- Uri Barkan – Srak, web-publication in Hebrew
- Barry Chamish – "Who Murdered Yitzhak Rabin?", ISBN 1-57129-081-8.
- David Morrison – Lies: The Israeli Secret Service And The Rabin Assassination
