= Denis Jeambar =

French journalist (born 1948)

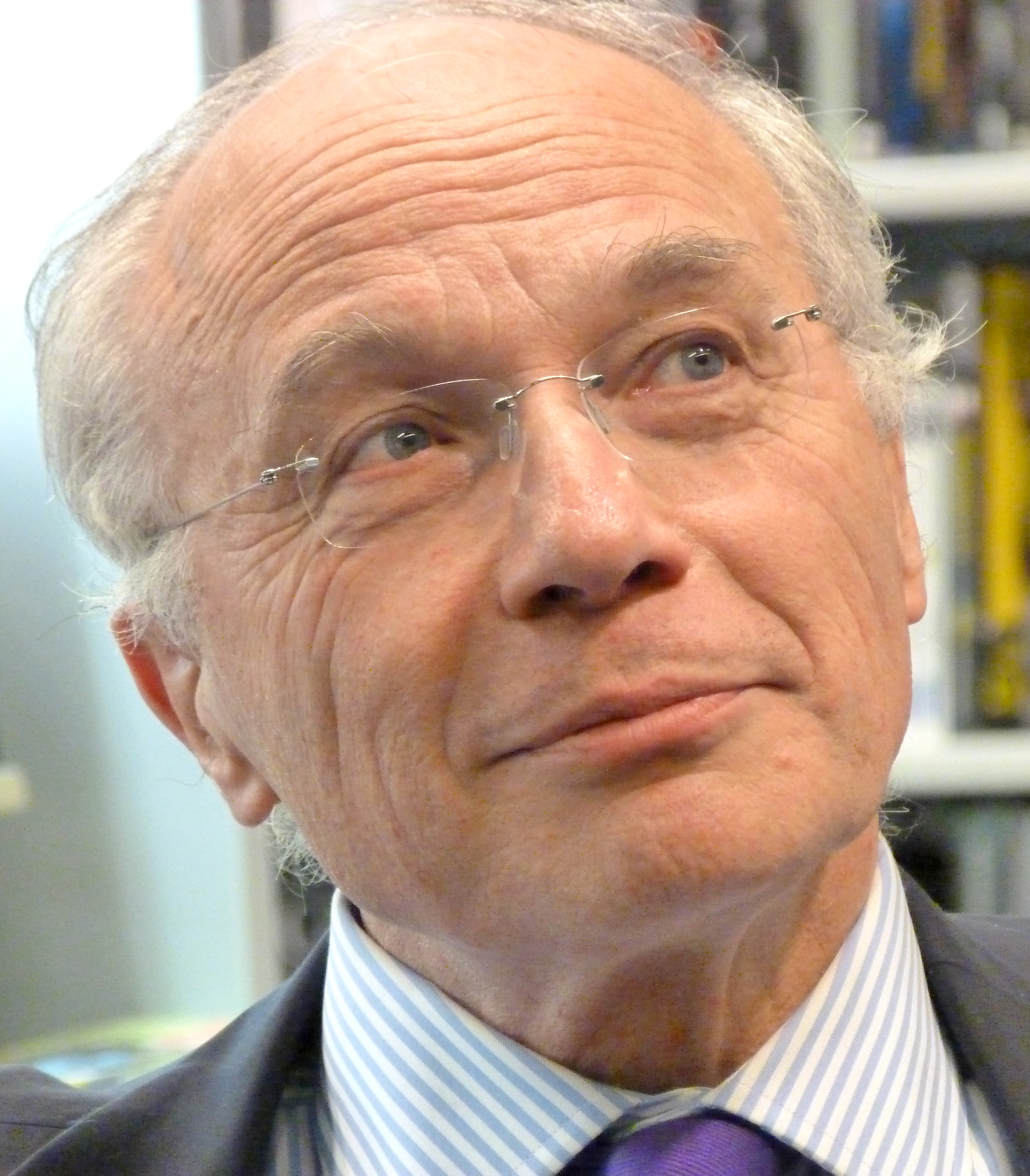
- Jeambar in 2010
- Born: 14 January 1948 (age 78); Valréas, France
- Education: Sciences Po
- Occupations: Journalist; Writer

Denis Jeambar (born 1948 in Valréas) is a French journalist.

== Biography ==
Having started his career at Paris-Match in 1970, he joined Le Point in 1972, rising to chief of its political staff in 1981. In 1988 he became editor-in-chief, as well as editor-in-chief of the political and cultural staffs. In 1995, Jeambar became general director of Europe 1 and after a few months, of L'Express. In 2001 he became president of the directory of Groupe Express-Expansion. In August 2006, he became director of Seuil editions.

According to the French electronic magazine La République des Lettres, Jeambar is ideologically close to neoconservatism, having displayed in the French journal L'Express "the opinion of the neoconservative, atlantist and zionist french right, mostly represented recently in France by former President Nicolas Sarkozy". René-Éric Dagorn underlines Jeambar's ideological proximity with Samuel Huntington, author of the "Clash of civilizations": according to him, Denis Jeambar and Alain Louyot have written an article published in L'Express, September 13, 2001, in which "all the arguments point to Huntington [...]".

According to French author Guillaume Weill-Raynal Denis Jeambar, along with journalist Daniel Leconte, has played an important role in the building of the controversy around the Muhammad al-Durrah incident.

He has been a member of the think tank Le Siècle.

== Bibliography ==
- Nos enfants nous haïront with Jacqueline Rémy, Éditions du Seuil, 2006
- Le défi du monde with Claude Allègre, Fayard, 2006
- Accusé Chirac, levez vous !, Seuil, 2005
- Les dictateurs à penser et autres donneurs de leçon, Seuil, 2004
- Un secret d'état, Odile Jacob, 1997
- Questions de France, Fayard, 1996
- L'inconnu de Goa, Grasset, 1996
- La Grande Lessive : anarchie et corruption with Jean-Marc Lech, Flammarion, 1995
- Le jour ou la girafe s'est assise, Arléa, 1994
- Le self-service électoral, with Jean-Marc Lech, Flammarion, 1993
- Le poisson pourrit par la tête, with José Frèches, Seuil, 1992
- Éloge de la trahison : de l'art de gouverner par le reniement en collaboration with Yves Roucaute, Seuil, 1988
- Dieu s'amuse, Robert Laffont, 1985
- Le PC dans la maison, Calmann-Lévy, 1984
- George Gershwin, Éditions Mazarine, 1982
- Sur la route de Flagstaff, Stock, 1980
