= Yves Roucaute =

French philosopher (born 1953)

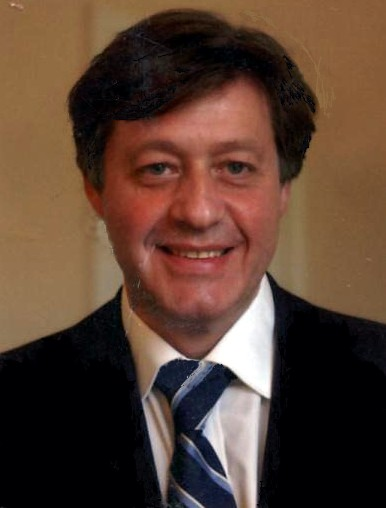
Yves Roucaute

Yves Roucaute (born 1953 in Paris) is a French philosopher (epistemology, political theory, theology), Phd (Law and Political science), Phd (philosophy), writer, professeur agrégé in philosophy, professeur agrégé in political science, teaching at Paris X University Nanterre, Previous President of the scientific Council of the "Institut National des Hautes Etudes de Securité et de Justice" (Security council of Prime minister), director of the review Cahiers de la Sécurité, counsellor of the "réformateurs" group at the French National Assembly. He has held a number of positions in cabinet ministers of right-wing governments, and is a close friend of Alain Madelin, Jean-Pierre Raffarin, and Nicolas Sarkozy. He is also a journalist and columnist (Canal +, Le Figaro, Le Monde, "Atlantico") He was editing director of some newspapers (L'Événement du jeudi, Alternances) and he is the owner of newspaper in the south of France (Le Bavar) and minority stockholder of some others. He is the majority stockholder of "Contemporary Bookstore" SAS.

== Career ==
Roucaute began his teaching career as a lecturer at Paris 8 University, with Jacques Lacan, then while working on his doctoral dissertation on Aristotle, Smith, and Ricardo, he was associated with the Faculty of Law of Amiens University. He completed this first PhD Then he was working and his doctoral dissertation on system and structure of the international politics. He has two agrégations (only four French academics have this), in Philosophy and in Law and Political Science. He became a full Professor of political science and devoted his scholarship over the following decades in Political philosophy and International Relations at the faculty of Law of Poitiers, then at the Faculty of Law of Paris X Nanterre.

Roucaute is a philosopher (influence of William of Ockham) and a theorist of «Homo creator», «Contemporary times», "global security paradigme 'peace of Humanity" and "human security". He was arrested in Cuba for his support to human rights association and priests. Friend of Massoud, he has been several times in Afghanistan. He was shooting by Talibans in 2001 when he was the guest of the North Alliance to celebrate the freedom in winter. Before the American troops, he arrived in Kaboul from a camp of Tajikistan, after his helicopter nearly crashed on the Hindou Koush mountains. He was also in Baghdad with his friends to support human rights against Saddam Hussein and come to celebrate the victory against Saddam Hussein in 2003. He was arrested in Vietnam to support buddhist monks then organised the support with his friend Alain Madelin.

Roucaute has backed Nicolas Sarkozy. He is involved in the European People's Party. He was a member of several minister'sofficess (notably the very influential Prime Minister's Office Edouard Balladur, the Ministry of Finance's Office Alain Madelin, the Ministry of Interior's Office Claude Guéant). He has authored a number of books on philosophy, on theology, on economics, on the New world order of the 1990s, on defence policies and on the influence of religion in politics.

Roucaute was director of France Television. He co-owns several medias, and writes occasionally in Le Figaro and The Wall Street Journal.

== Bibliography ==
=== Philosophy ===
- La République contre la démocratie, Paris, Plon, 1996
- Les Démagogues, Paris, Plon, 1999
- La Puissance de la liberté, Paris, Presses universitaires de France, 2004; Paris, Contemporary Bookstore, 2013.
- Le Néoconservatisme est un humanisme, Paris, Presses universitaires de France, 2005; Paris, Contemporary Bookstore, 2013.
- Vers la paix des civilisations. Le retour de la spiritualité, Paris, Alban, 2008
- La Puissance d'Humanité du néolithisme aux temps contemporains, le génie du christianisme, Paris, François-Xavier de Guibert, 2011; Paris, Contemporary Bookstore, 2013.
- Eloge du mode de vie à la française, Paris, Editions du Rocher, 2012; Paris, Contemporary Bookstore, 2013
- Histoire de la Philosophie Politique, volume 1, Paris, Contemporary Bookstore, 2014
- Histoire de la Philosophie Politique, volume 2, Paris, Contemporary Bookstore, 2014
- Petit Traité sur les Origines Chrétiennes de la Démocratie Libérale, Paris, Contemporary Bookstore, 2014

co-authored

- " La Menace archaïque dans les républiques contre le devoir de mémoire et de silence ", dans La Mémoire entre silence et oubli, Presses universitaires de Laval, Laval, 2006
- Articles dans l'Encyclopédie universelle philosophique, vol. 2 et vol.3, 1992 : " Nicos Poulantzas ", " Georges Sorel "
- Dans le Dictionnaire des œuvres politiques, PUF, 1986 " Montaigne "
- Dans le Dictionnaire des Philosophes, PUF, 1984 : " Poulantzas ", " Gramsci ", " Trotsky ", " Proudhon ", " Destutt de Tracy ", " Saint-Just ", " Zwingli ", " Jansenius ", " Marc Aurèle ", " Molina ". Articles de moindre importance : " Criton ", " Les cyniques ", " Diogène le cynique ", " Antisthène ", " Eudème ", " Eudore ", " Hermias ", " Hermippos ", " Hermodore de S. ", " Hermodore de E ", " Hermotime ", " Musonius Rufus ", " Varron "
- " Rawls en France ", dans L'Évolution de la philosophie du droit en Allemagne et en France depuis la fin de la seconde guerre mondiale, Paris, PUF, 1991
- " Jean-Louis Seconds, théoricien de la Terreur ", dans Les Déclarations de l'An I, Paris, PUF, 1995
- " L'Abject ", dans La Xénophobie est-elle une norme psychique, Université de Nice, 1994.
- " L'Individualisme électronique à l'heure du numérique et du virtuel ", in Médias-pouvoirs, n°45, 1997, p. 40-51.

=== Political science ===
- Le Parti socialiste, Paris, Huisman, 1985
- Histoire des socialistes, de 1871 à nos jours, 1983
- Le PCF et l'armée, Paris, PUF, 1981.
- Le PCF et les sommets de l'État, PUF, Paris, 1979
- Éloge de la trahison, avec Denis Jeambar, Seuil, Paris, 1986
- Discours sur les femmes qui en font un peu trop, Plon, 1993
- Splendeurs et misères des journalistes, Paris, Calmann-Lévy, 1991

Articles dans des ouvrages collectifs et des revues

- " Guerre froide : le déséquilibre de la Terreur ou l'échec des paradigmes réalistes en relations internationales ", dans Relations internationales, Peter Lang, Berne, 2006.
- " Cuba : géopolitique de l'insularité " in Annuaire de Relations Internationales, Paris, Belayt, 2001, 2004.
- " Le Transnationalisme comme programme de transition en épistémologie des relations internationales ", dans Le Trimestre du monde, 3^{e} trimestre, 1991.
- " La Nouvelle Donne internationale ", in Outre-Terre, revue de géopolitique, Paris, 2003.
- " La Séparation des pouvoirs ", dans Les Juges contre la république, Crises, 4/94.
- " Différence, intégration, assimilation : le défi républicain ", dans Être Français, Cises, 2/1994
- " Énergie, le désordre européen ", in Les Nouveaux Chemins de l'énergie, Paris, Alphares, 2003, p. 39-52

=== Political sciences ===
- Le Parti socialiste, Paris, Huisman, 1985
- Histoire des socialistes, de 1871 à nos jours, 1983
- Le PCF et l'armée, Paris, PUF, 1981.
- Le PCF et les sommets de l'État, PUF, Paris, 1979
- Éloge de la trahison, with Denis Jeambar, Seuil, Paris, 1986
- Discours sur les femmes qui en font un peu trop, Plon
- Splendeurs et misères des journalistes, Paris, Calmann-Lévy, 1991

in reviews and other collective works

- " Guerre froide : le déséquilibre de la Terreur ou l'échec des paradigmes réalistes en relations internationales ", dans Relations internationales, Peter Lang, Berne, 2006.
- " Cuba : géopolitique de l'insularité " in Annuaire de Relations Internationales, Paris, Belayt, 2001, 2004.
- " Le Transnationalisme comme programme de transition en épistémologie des relations internationales ", dans Le Trimestre du monde, 3^{e} trimestre, 1991.
- " La Nouvelle Donne internationale ", in Outre-Terre, revue de géopolitique, Paris, 2003.
- " La Séparation des pouvoirs ", dans Les Juges contre la république, Crises, 4/94.
- " Différence, intégration, assimilation : le défi républicain ", dans Être Français, Cises, 2/1994
- " Énergie, le désordre européen ", in Les Nouveaux Chemins de l'énergie, Paris, Alphares, 2003, p. 39-52

== Articles and video ==
- , 2 of November 2010.
- With Friends Like These, The Wall Street Journal, 21 June 2006.
- Intervention Vietnam .
- Interview Peace Of Civilization, France 24, 10 June 2008.
