= Catherine Margaret Shachaf =

Israeli biologist

- קתרין מרגרט שחף
- Born: Vasco da Gama, Goa, India
- Education: Technion - Israel Institute of Technology
- Scientific career
- Fields: Cell Biology
- Workplaces: Stanford University

Catherine Margaret Shachaf (Hebrew: קתרין מרגרט שחף) is an Indian cell biologist. She previously held an instructor position at Stanford University School of Medicine, and has made discoveries in cancer research. Shachaf is on the Editorial Board of the International Journal of Green Nanotechnology.

== Education ==
Ph.D: Israel Institute of Technology, Molecular Medicine.

== Key scientific contributions ==
Shachaf has researched how MYC expression induces cancer in mice and the effect of its inactivation in those tumors. She showed that removing MYC expression kills the tumor and that MYC reprograms the tumor cells. When MYC expression is taken away from the tumor cells, they are released to their inherent embryonic program. The appearance of the tissue formed in this process looks normal by histology (a method used by pathologists to determine the presence of cancer cells). However, Shachaf showed that the cells derived from the tumor are "camouflaged" to appear normal but have the capability to easily revert and become tumors.

The MYC protein in cancers correlates with poor prognosis and is a difficult therapeutic target. To find alternative downstream targets of MYC, Shachaf defined levels of MYC expression required to drive tumorigenic properties. She conducted a systematic genomic and proteomic profile of MYC dependent tumor cells using microarray analysis, mass spectrometry, cell-antibody arrays and phospho-flow (a flow cytometry based approach to study phosphorylation events in single cells). As a member of the Stanford NCI funded Integrated Cancer Biology Program (ICBP), Shachaf and her colleagues developed a computational program of the genes and gene programs that are required to maintain cancers at different stages of aggressiveness. Using this program, Shachaf and her team found the gene silencing and apoptotic programs to be most significant in inducing tumor cell death.
