= Book World/Blue Star =

Blue Star Productions was a Sun Lakes, Arizona-based publishing imprint of Book World, Inc. of mostly comparative spiritual traditions, mystical, metaphysical, new age, paranormal, ufology, philosophy, non-fiction, and fiction books.

== Books ==
- Barry Brierley, Wasichu's Return, 1996, ISBN 1-881542-20-3
- Richard J Boylan, Star Kids: The Emerging Cosmic Generation, 2005 ISBN 1-881542-75-0
- Robert Bryce, A Question of Time, 1995, ISBN 1-881542-17-3
- Barbara B. Carvalle, Lefty, Louie and the Boys, 1993, ISBN 1-881542-05-X
- David E. Caywood and Landi Mellas, The Other Sky: Reclaiming Who We Are and Why We Came Here, ISBN 1-881542-73-4
- Barry Chamish, Return of the Giants, 2000, ISBN 1-881542-66-1
- Rebecca Cramer, Mission to Sonora, 1998, ISBN 1-881542-50-5
  - The View from Frog Mountain, 2000, ISBN 1-881542-63-7
- Barbara DeBolt, How To Write A Best Seller In 40 Days OR Less, ISBN 1-881542-10-6
- Shari Dodd, The Emerald of Lastanzia, ISBN 1-881542-52-1
  - Rhiannon, ISBN 1-881542-53-X
- Rene Donovan, Me 'n God in the Coffee Shop, 1998, ISBN 1-881542-49-1
- Bruce Goldberg, Time Travelers from our Future, ISBN 1-881542-65-3
- Dezra-Lehr Guthrie (Dezra*), Heart Secrets, 2000, ISBN 1-881542-47-5
  - Little Book of Angels, ISBN 1-881542-41-6 (and reflections journal)
  - Magic Message, 2000, ISBN 1-881542-44-0
  - My Magical Friend, 2000, ISBN 1-881542-45-9
  - Ocean Messages, 2000, ISBN 1-881542-59-9
  - Pocket Psychic: (Tells Your Future Instantly), 2000, ISBN 1-881542-43-2
- Christopher Harding, The Reindeer Boy: A Mystical Journey into the Dreamworld, 1999, ISBN 1-881542-56-4
- Norma Green Hickox, Cataclysms: A New Look at Earth Changes - The Chrysalis Teachings, 1996, ISBN 1-881542-28-9
- Valerie Kirkwood, Shadow of Time, 2000, ISBN 1-881542-46-7
- Laura Leffers, Dance on the Water, 1996, ISBN 1-881542-10-6
- Lisa Iodice, Michael: A Novel, 2000, ISBN 1-881542-60-2
- Diana Nilsen, Where You Live -- Counts!, 1999, ISBN 1-881542-57-2
- Michael Patton, The Raven's Way: A Shamanic Journey into Native American Folklore, 1999, ISBN 1-881542-58-0
- Bridget Pluis, Heaven Waits, ISBN 1-881542-67-X
  - Saying Goodbye Is Not Forever, ISBN 1-881542-71-8
- Kelly Rosano, If You Are My Soul Mate...Then Why Am I So Unhappy?, ISBN 1-881542-80-7
- K. Skeffington-Clark, Timshar: The Mindsounders - Book 1: Abduction, ISBN 1-881542-68-8
- Patricia Telesco, Mirror, Mirror: Reflections of the Sacred Self, 1999, ISBN 1-881542-51-3
- Susanna Thorpe-Clark, Changing The Thoughts, ISBN 1-881542-72-6
- Donald R. Todd, The Antilles Incident, 1997, ISBN 1-881542-37-8
- Charles Wright, The Best Kept Secrets, 1997, ISBN 1-881542-38-6
- (unknown), We Have Watched You . . ., 1994, ISBN 1-881542-03-3
