= Philippe Karsenty =

French media analyst (born 1966)

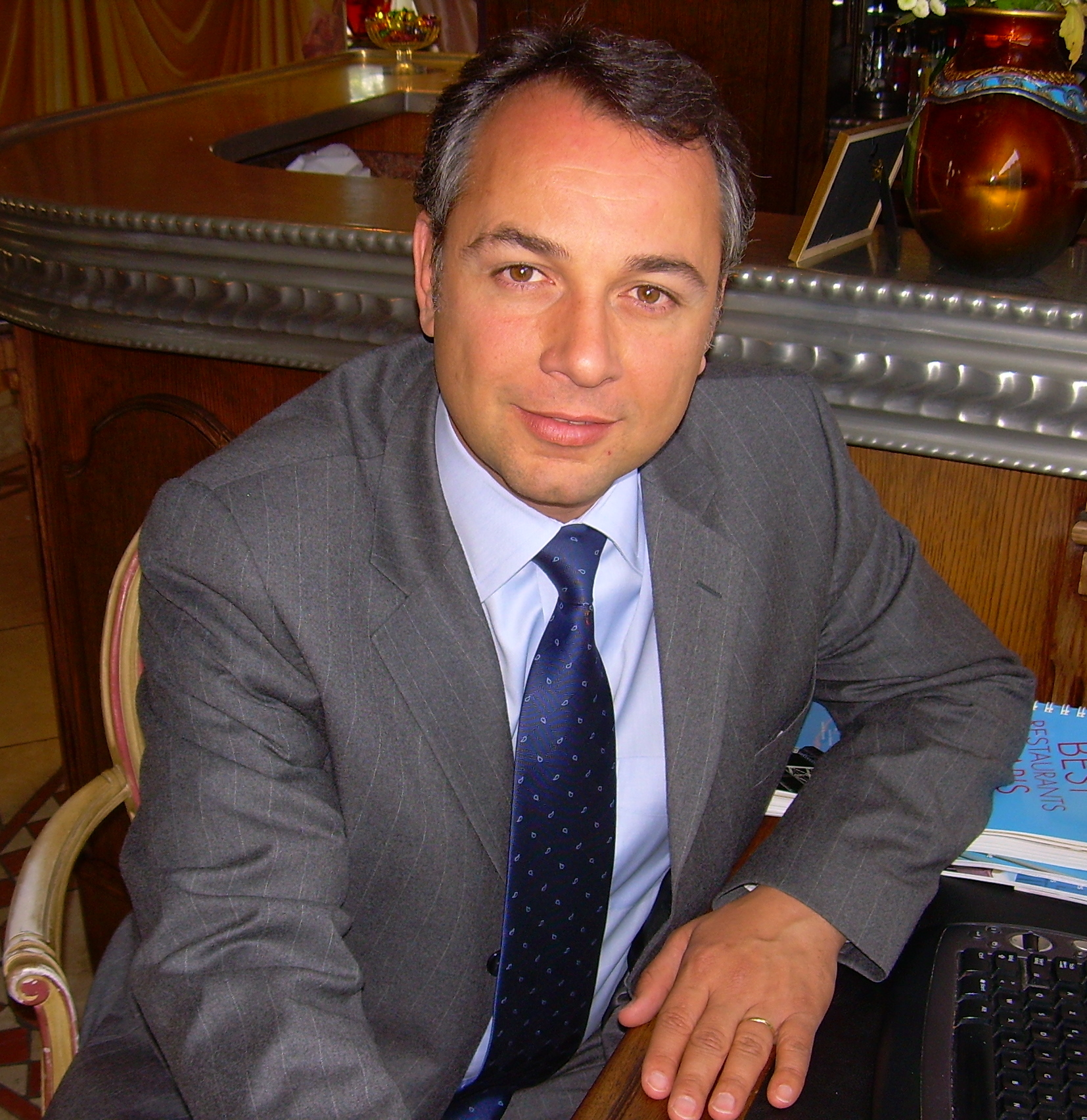
- Born: 25 June 1966 (age 60); Issy-les-Moulineaux, Paris, France
- Occupations: Media analyst, founder of the watchdog Media-Ratings, local councilor of Neuilly-sur-Seine
- Known for: Muhammad al Durrah conspiracy and lawsuit
- Website: www.m-r.fr

Philippe Karsenty (born 25 June 1966) is a French politician and founder of Media-Ratings, a company monitoring the French media for bias. Karsenty came to public attention when he was sued for libel by the public French television network, France 2, over accusations of staged footage by France 2 over the killing of a 12-year-old Palestinian boy, Muhammad al-Durrah. The libel suit lasted a decade, with the ultimate verdict being against Karsenty and requiring him to pay damages to France 2.

== Early life ==
Karsenty was born in Issy-les-Moulineaux to a Jewish family. When he was in his 20s, he set up a share-trading company on the Paris Bourse, and continued to work as a broker until 1997.

== Career ==
In 1996, he set up a business consultancy, and in 2002, he ran for parliament on a center-right ticket, obtaining only 3% of the vote. He was then condemned to one-year ineligibility for not deposing his campaign budget. In 2008, he was elected a deputy mayor of Neuilly-sur-Seine.

=== 2012 legislative election ===
In the 2012 French legislative election, Karsenty stood as a dissident right-wing candidate, against the candidate endorsed by Sarkozy's Union for a Popular Movement, in the Eighth constituency for French residents overseas (which includes French residents in Israel, as well as in Italy, Turkey, Greece and several other countries). He finished third, with 14.45% of the vote, and did not advance to the run-off vote. In February 2013, the Constitutional Council found irregularities in the funding of his electoral campaign and barred him from standing for public office for a period of one year.

== Views on Israel and Palestine ==
In 2002, he was proactive in a tentative attempt to censor the dissemination of a pro-Palestinian book "Rêver la Palestine" (i.e., "dreaming of Palestine") edited by renowned French editor Flammarion.

Orit Arfa of the Jewish Journal described Karsenty as a "pro-Israel activist".

=== Muhammad al-Durrah controversy ===
Karsenty came to public attention in 2004, when he was sued for libel by the French television network France 2. Karsenty had accused the network of having broadcast staged footage of the reported killing of a 12-year-old Palestinian boy, Muhammad al-Durrah, during a gun battle in the Gaza Strip in 2000. France 2 won its case in October 2006, but the judgment was overturned by the Paris Court of Appeal in May 2008, with France 2 refusing to release the full footage taken by their stringer on that day. France 2 appealed the decision to the Cour de cassation, France's highest court, and in February 2012, the Cour de cassation overturned the ruling of the Court of Appeal, which had acquitted Karsenty. On 26 June 2013, the Paris Court of Appeals once again convicted Karsenty of defamation, and fined him €7000.

In parallel, on 10 June 2010, a court in Nanterre sentenced Canal Plus and Tac Press for defaming Karsenty in a documentary entitled Rumors, Brainwashing: The New News War, broadcast by this channel on 24 April 2008.
