= Barak Ravid =

Israeli journalist (born 1980)

- ברק רביד
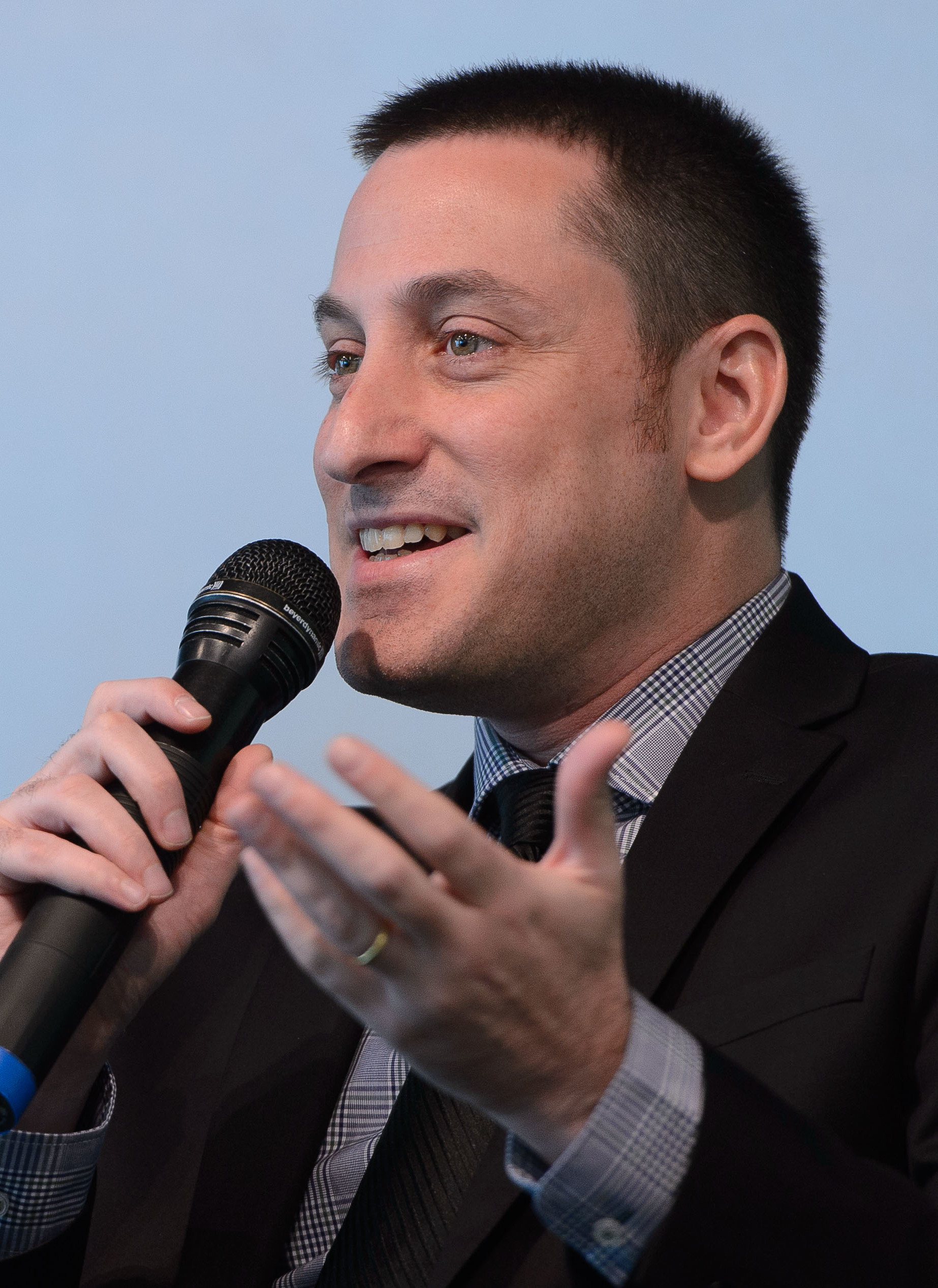
- Ravid in 2015
- Born: 22 May 1980 (age 46); Kfar Sava, Israel
- Education: Tel Aviv University (BA)

Barak Ravid (Hebrew: ברק רביד) is an Israeli journalist who serves as a political analyst for CNN and reporter for Axios and Channel 12 News. He previously worked for the Israeli website Walla News, Israel's Channel 13 News, and Haaretz newspaper.

== Early life ==
Ravid was born in the Israeli city of Kfar Saba. At age 18 he was drafted into the Israel Defense Forces, serving in the signals intelligence division of Unit 8200. He earned a Bachelor of Arts in Middle Eastern history from Tel Aviv University.

== Career ==
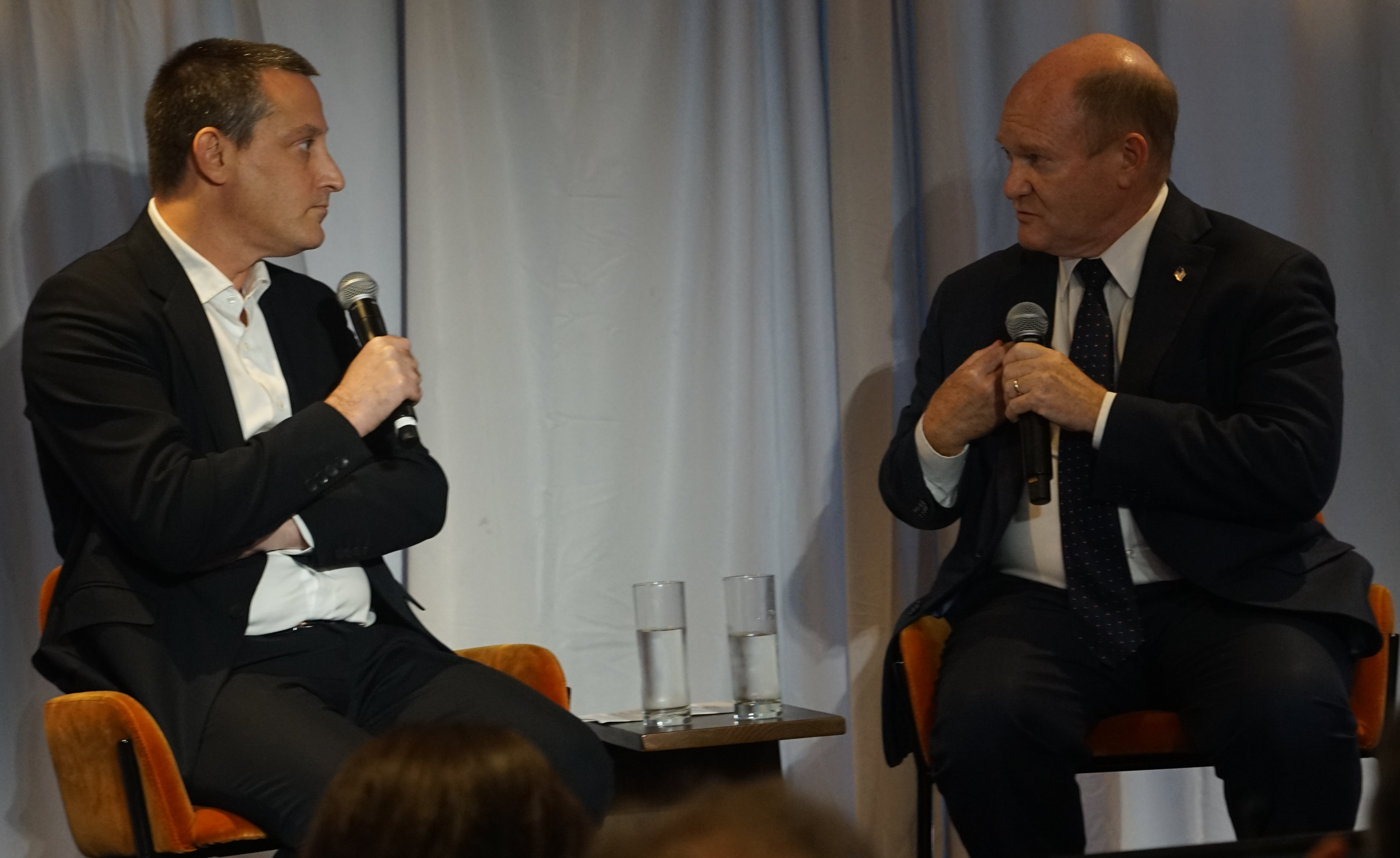
Ravid and U.S. Sen. Chris Coons at an Axios event in New York in 2025

In 2007 Ravid started working as a political pundit for the Israeli newspaper Haaretz.

In 2017 Ravid joined Channel 13 News. He was dismissed from Channel 13 in 2020. In 2020, he began working for Walla News and Axios. In 2023, he began working at CNN as a political and foreign policy on-air analyst. In April 2024, Ravid won the White House Press Correspondents' Aldo Beckman Award for Journalistic Excellence, with the judges particularly citing his reporting on the October 7th attacks and their ongoing aftermath; the award was personally presented to him by President Joe Biden, who thanked Ravid "for his efforts on behalf of Israel".

In 2025, Ravid left Walla News and began working as a reporter and commentator for the Israeli television news company News 12 as a correspondent in Washington, D.C. In 2026, Barak Ravid's reporting of negotiation processes between the US and Iran during the ongoing Iran war, have been criticized by various American politicians, Wall Street analysts, and the Iranian state media, who accuse Barak of spreading false or misleading information, often citing reports from anonymous sources of "close" or "imminent" deals, for the purpose of market manipulation of oil prices. Ravid has denied having any coordination with traders and defended his reporting.

== Publications ==
- Ravid, Barak (2023). Trump's Peace: The Abraham Accords And The Reshaping Of The Middle East. ISBN 979-8391736738.

== Personal life ==
Ravid lives in the Washington, D.C., area, where he moved for Axios in 2023, having previously lived in Tel Aviv. He is married and has two children.
