= Yom-Tov Samia =

Israeli general (born 1954)

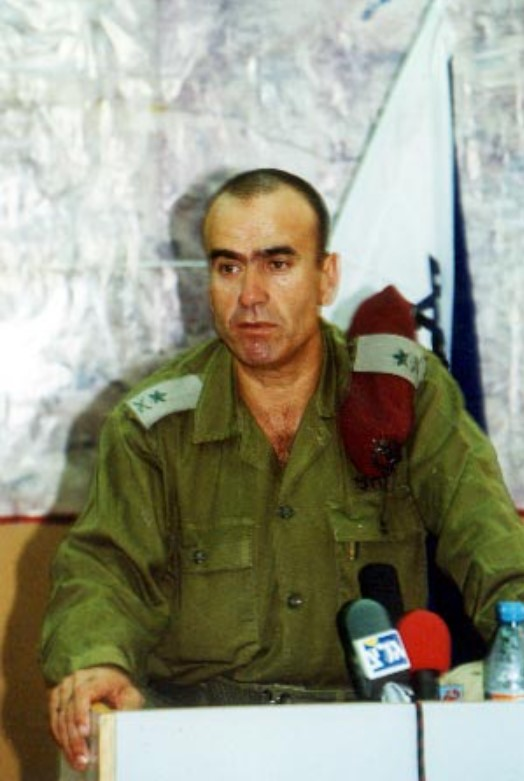
- Samia giving a press briefing on the Gaza Strip, 2000
- Native name: יום טוב סמיה
- Born: 18 June 1954 (age 71); Pardesiya, Israel
- Allegiance: Israel
- Israel Defense Forces: Southern Command
- Rank: Major General
- Alma mater: Tel Aviv University, Ph.D.

Yom Tov Samia (Hebrew: יום טוב סמיה; born 18 June 1954) is a retired Israeli general. He was head of the Israel Defense Forces' Southern Command from January 2001 to December 2003. He retired from military service as a major general.

== Biography ==
Samia was born in Pardesiya, grew up in Netanya, and now lives in Tel Aviv. He holds a Ph.D. in sociology and political science. In 1998 he won the Tel Aviv University's Jaffee Center for Strategic Studies's Tshetshik Prize for Israel's Security for his research on "The Organizational Climate of the IDF's Field Units."

Samia was president and CEO of the BARAN Group, is currently (2008) president of "Yam Deshers" LTD, president and CEO of Israel Corp (Biofuels), S. B. Security, Katz Logistics, Orgad Holding, E.D.S. Israel, Girit Celadon Israel (Gates and Checkpoints systems).

He writes for various magazines on issues of national security, such as this 2007 article from the Jerusalem Center for Public Affairs entitled Weapons Smuggling from Egypt to Gaza: What Can Egypt and Israel Do?
