= Luc Rosenzweig =

French journalist (1943–2018)

- Born: August 8, 1943; Bonneville, France
- Died: July 13, 2018 (aged 74); Lyon, France
- Occupation: Journalist
- Employer(s): Le Monde; Libération

Luc Rosenzweig (August 8, 1943 – July 13, 2018) was a French journalist for Libération and Le Monde, and author of several books.

== Early life ==
Rosenzweig was born on August 8, 1943, in Bonn, Haute Savoie. His father, Rolf Rozenzweig, was a Polish Jewish communist who emigrated to France in 1933.

Rosenzweig went to preparatory school and became associated with the Center for Institutional Study, Research, and Training (CERFI), a left-wing research center.

== Career ==
Rosenzweig began his career as a German teacher. He first worked as a journalist for Nouvelles d’Orléans in Orléans in the 1970s. From 1982 to 1985, he was a journalist for Libération. He later worked for Le Monde, France's paper of record. He was the editor-in-chief of Regards for two years.

Rosenzweig was the author of several books on Judaism, including La Jeune France juive and Catalogue pour les juifs de maintenant.

== Death ==
Rosenzweig died on July 13, 2018.
