= Amnon Abramovich =

Israeli journalist, publicist, writer, and commentator

- אמנון אברמוביץ'
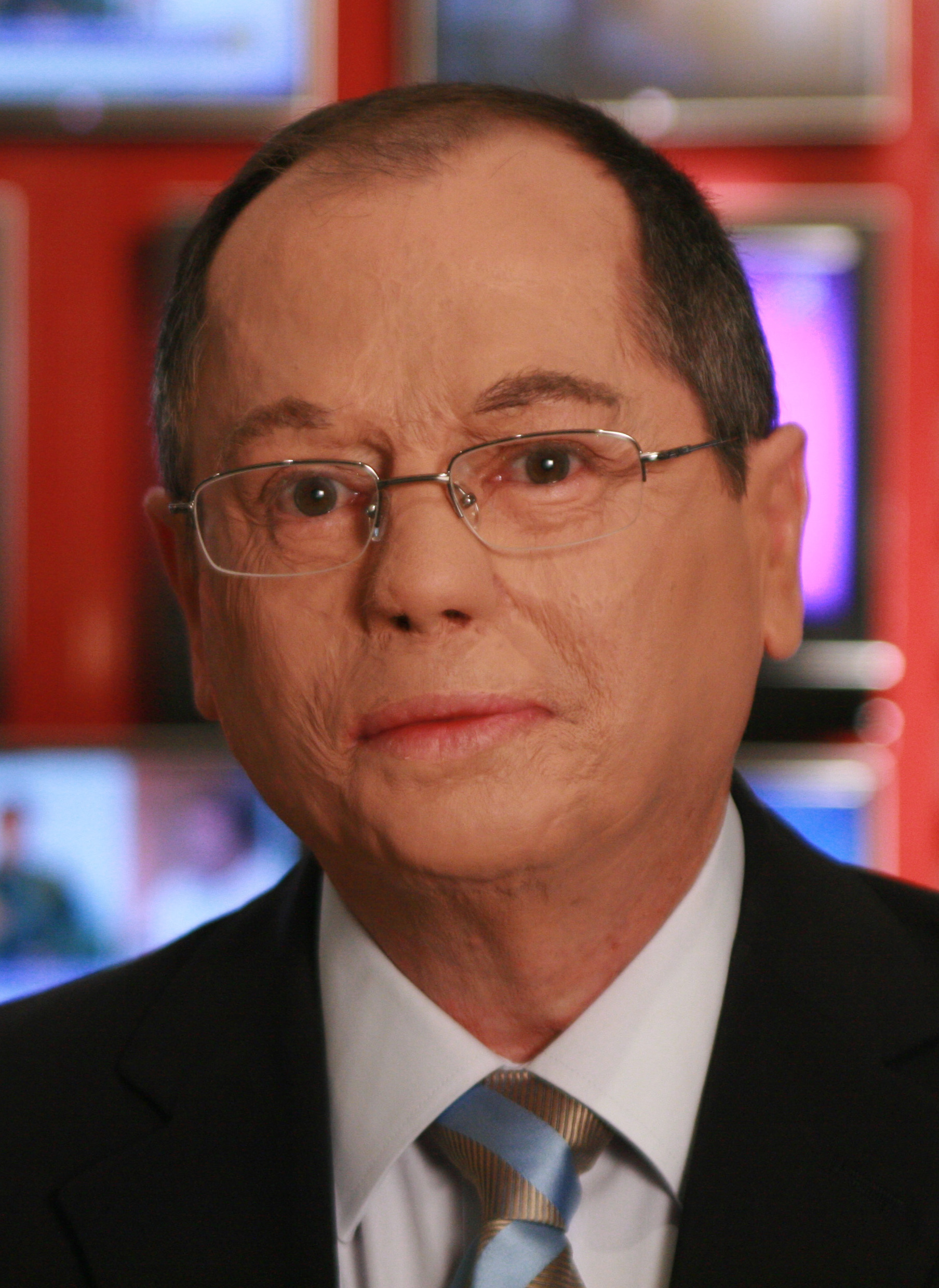
- Amnon Abramovich, 2008
- Born: September 15, 1951 (age 74); Kibbutz Nir Am, Israel
- Education: Tel Aviv University
- Occupations: journalist; publicist; writer; commentator
- Years active: 1977–present
- Known for: journalism

Amnon Abramovich (Hebrew: אמנון אברמוביץ'; born September 15, 1951) is an Israeli publicist, journalist, and political commentator. He is the political commentator for the news company that broadcasts on Channel 12.

== Biography ==
Abramovich was born in Kibbutz Nir Am to parents who were among the founders of the kibbutz. At a young age, he moved with his family to Kiryat Ata. In 1969, he enlisted in the IDF and served in the Armored Corps. In 1972, he began studying law at Tel Aviv University. During the Yom Kippur War, he was drafted into the reserves and fought as a tank driver for the commander of Battalion 409 under the command of Lt. Col. Uzi Ben Yitzhak, in Brigade 600. On October 9, 1973, the fourth day of the war, he was wounded in battles in the Suez Canal area. He was severely burned on his face and body, but continued to drive the tank because he believed that there were soldiers left in it. For his courage and devotion to duty, he received the Chief of Staff Medal:

On October 9, 1973, in the "Television" area, during the attack on the target, the tank that Sergeant Amnon Abramovich was driving was hit and began to burn. Although his hands and clothes began to burn, he continued driving, because he believed that there were people left in the tank. In this act, Sergeant Amnon Abramovich demonstrated devotion to the mission and courage.

— The Chief of Staff's Medal of Honor awarded to Amnon Abramovich, on the "Oz Rucham" website of the IDF's Human Resources Division

After a rehabilitation that included about 60 surgeries, he returned to law school and, upon completion, interned at the Tel Aviv District Attorney's Office (criminal) and with a private attorney in the field of civil law. In 1978, he received his law license.

He began his journalistic career during his studies as a member of the editorial board of the university's student newspaper "Yatoosh" and wrote for the weekly supplement "Durban" of "Yediot Aharonot". In 1977, he began working for the newspaper "Al HaMishmar" and in 1978 was appointed deputy editor of the newspaper's "Hotem" supplement. Starting in 1979, he also wrote for the monthly "Monitin". In 1981, he moved to the newspaper "Maariv" and served as a political correspondent, the newspaper's correspondent in London and a senior commentator. In his writings, he expressed opposition to the First Lebanon War. In July 1984, he published a report about a planned operation to eliminate Abu Jihad in implicit language. Following the publication, the operation was postponed. He was one of the exposers of the Shin Bet's involvement in the Kav 300 affair and revealed information in the Jonathan Pollard and Hakam affair. He left "Maariv" in 1994 in protest of the wiretapping affair at the newspaper (in which he was also recorded without his knowledge), and moved on to serve as a commentator on Channel One. Since 2003, he has served as a commentator on Channel 12 news and appears on the regular panel on the "Ulpan Shishi" Friday night program.

Abramovich's political views are identified with the Israeli left. In 1995, while he was serving as a commentator on Channel One, the association petitioned the Supreme Court of Israel for the public's right to know, claiming that his views were expressed in the commentaries he broadcast and demanding that other positions be represented as well. Following the petition, Channel One undertook to give a platform to other positions as well. Another petition by the association in 1996 was rejected.

=== Exposés and notable mentions ===
Two weeks after the assassination of Yitzhak Rabin, Abramovich revealed the testimonies of Yigal Amir, his brother Hagai Amir, and Margalit Har Shefi. He also reiterated Benny Alon's revelation that Avishai Raviv was an Shin Bet agent and that his code name was "Champagne." Abramovich published the news without it being forwarded to the military censor for prior review. Following the publication, he was questioned by the police, but it was decided not to prosecute him after he expressed remorse and pledged to forward any case of doubt regarding security information to the censor. In an interview that year, he said: "On second thought, I wouldn't have published it. I didn't foresee what would come of it. I didn't want to be the one to give the right-wing free gifts."

About half a year before the disengagement plan was implemented, Abramovich said in a discussion on the subject at the Van Leer Institute in February 2005: "Sharon should be kept like an etrog, kept in a sealed box, lined with sponge, cotton wool and cellophane, at least until the end of the disengagement." Sharon, who was then the Prime Minister of Israel and was being investigated on suspicion of corruption, was the main initiator of the plan, and in Abramovich's opinion the only one who could implement it. Abramovich's statement provoked much criticism - among others from Abramovich's colleagues, including Nachum Barnea. Abramovich referred to the same statement several times: in May 2005 he wrote, "The most defiant, impudent, and demagogic claim of all is the claim that we, the journalists, are covering up Sharon's criminal acts, criminal "Really, and all for the sake of disengagement." In July 2005, he wrote that his statement was intended so that commentators would not present Sharon in a negative light, but that in the news columns "he should be treated like a god of war." Due to Abramovich's use of it, the word "compromise" became a symbol of turning a blind eye to corruption when committed by those whom the media wanted to criticize, and of political bias in the media in general.

On July 8, 2006, Abramovich revealed that the President of the State of Israel, Moshe Katsav, met with Attorney General Meni Mazuz and complained that his former chief of staff, A., was trying to blackmail him by claiming that he had committed indecent acts with her. This affair developed into an indictment that ended with Katsav's conviction and imprisonment.

In August 2010, Abramovich, together with Roni Daniel, revealed that The "Galant Document" attempted to cast blame on the acting Chief of Staff, Maj. Gen. Gabi Ashkenazi, ostensibly as part of Maj. Gen. Yoav Gallant's strategy for the position. The revelation caused a stir in the political and military establishment, and Abramovich was summoned to testify before the police as part of the investigation into the affair. At the end of a police investigation, the document turned out to be a forgery, and that it had been leaked to Abramovich by Col. (res.) Gabi Siboni, Ashkenazi's friend, whom Abramovich described as "a solid, reliable and off-the-scenes source." and disinterested in this matter".

In December 2012, immediately after the press conference in which Prime Minister Benjamin Netanyahu and Foreign Minister Avigdor Lieberman announced the unification of the Likud and Yisrael Beiteinu lists ahead of the 19th Knesset elections, Abramovich published the alleged existence of a secret document in which Netanyahu and Lieberman agreed to rotate the role of Prime Minister between them. The revelation turned out to be false.

In February 2013, he gave an interview to Haaretz newspaper, saying that the most important things in his journalistic work were "to talk about the occupation and the price of the occupation", and "to convince the public of what is important".

During 2017, Abramovich had several exposés regarding the investigations against Prime Minister Benjamin Netanyahu, such as the subpoena of billionaire Ron Lauder when he arrived at Shimon Peres' funeral and the retraction of Arnon Milchan from his initial testimony.

In August 2017, impersonator Yossi Vider released a recording of a phone call he had with Abramovich in which he pretended to be Ehud Barak and told Abramovich that he was going to run for the leadership of the Labor Party. Abramovich agreed in the conversation about the need to end Benjamin Netanyahu's rule, saying "there is no debate about that". Abramovich responded that he immediately realized that it was a hoax and that it was an edited segment. Vider denied it and released the full recording.

== Criticism ==
During Operation Protective Edge in July 2014, approximately 150–200 people demonstrated in front of the Hadashot 2 studio, specifically against Abramovich. In September 2016, when he arrived at the military court in Jaffa to cover the trial of Elor Azaria, dozens of protesters gathered around him and chanted insults. On both occasions, he required police assistance.

=== Legal proceedings ===
In 1996, Pinchas Fischler was accused of having a criminal record in his role as director of Prime Minister Benjamin Netanyahu's office. Fischler filed a civil lawsuit and a criminal complaint against Abramovich. Four years later, in 2000, Abramovich apologized for his comments on air, and Attorney General Elyakim Rubinstein subsequently dropped the criminal proceedings against Abramovich.

In 2010, the Shalem Center filed a 4 million NIS libel lawsuit against Abramovich and Hadashot 2, for attributing to the center a role in capital-government relations during his column in the Friday edition. In a compromise between the parties, Abramovich retracted his statements in the edition.

Benny Katsover filed a defamation lawsuit against Abramovich, for attributing to Katsover in an article he published the phrase "Rabin and Peres should be put before a firing squad." In January 2023, the Central District Court ordered Abramovich to compensate Katsover with 15,000 NIS and legal costs of 5,000 NIS.

== Personal life ==
Abramovich lives in Ramat Hasharon. He is married to Prof. Rachel Tselnik-Abramovich, a retired professor of classical studies at Tel Aviv University, and has two children.

Abramovich is known as a soccer fan and a supporter of the Maccabi Haifa team, and even participated as a commentator on the program "The Press Stand" in its early seasons.
