= Yaron Kanner =

Israeli lawyer (b. 1968)

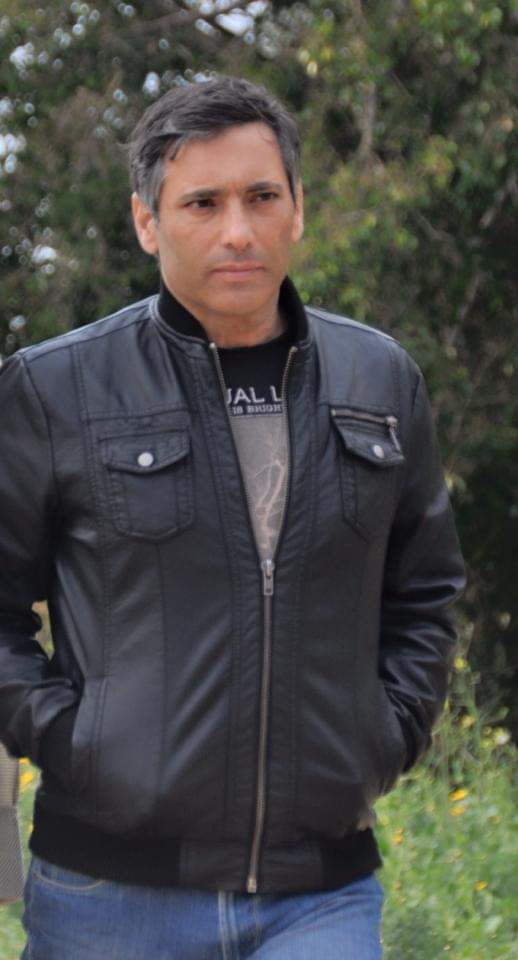
Yaron Kanner, 2014

Yaron Kanner (Hebrew: ירון קנר; born 1968, Holon) is an Israeli social entrepreneur and lawyer, as well as the director of the Hinam Center for Social Tolerance.

== Biography ==
Yaron Kanner was born in Holon in 1968. He studied at the Netiv Meir High School in Jerusalem and later at Yeshivat Ateret Cohanim (today known as Yeshivat Ateret Yerushalayim). He served in the "Shimshon" undercover unit in the IDF during the First Intifada and then as a reserve officer (Major). In the 1990s, he served as a correspondent for Israel Radio's Channel 2 network and, was among the first reporters to broadcast live on Israel Radio that shots had been fired at then-prime minister Yitzhak Rabin. ↵After working as a journalist, he began to study social law.. As a lawyer, he served as the director of the Legal Department of the Tebeka Association and led legal battles against the private and institutional discrimination of members of the Ethiopian community. He was one of the attorneys which handled the legal struggle in the affair of the "Nezer Etzion" school in Petach Tikvah, whose students (except one) were members of the Ethiopian community.

In 2012-2013 he served as CEO of the Kol BaRama radio station, following that he became director of Panim – the Association of Israeli Jewish Organizations. In 2016 founded the Hinam Center for Social Tolerance.

Kanner holds a master's degree in law from the Hebrew University of Jerusalem and is a PhD student of sociology at AMU. His research examines the tools for promoting social tolerance.

In 2018, Kenner was selected by Israel Today Newspaper as one of the "Seventy Israelis You Must Know."

== As a Journalist ==
About two months before the assassination of Yitzhak Rabin, Kanner entered the Eyal organization, where Yigal Amir was a member. During his recruitment period, Avishai Raviv visited his home, and Kanner also held meetings with Yigal Amir and Hagai Amir in Hebron. He agreed to join the organization as a weapons instructor. Kanner's intention for having these meetings was for him to evaluate the organizations intentions in light of their public threats against Yitzhak Rabin. The investigation was planned to continue for several months, but the timetable was interrupted by Rabin's assassination, after which Kanner immediately published a series of articles detailing his investigation.

Kanner served, at the time, as a reporter for the Israel Radio network. On November 4, 1995, he was sent by the radio network to cover the "Yes to Peace, No to Violence" rally held at Malkhei Yisrael Square (today Rabin Square in Tel Aviv). Kanner was one of the first reporters to report that shots were fired at Yitzhak Rabin as he descended the back stairs of the stage.

In 1996, Kanner conducted an investigation into forced psychiatric hospitalization, during which he managed to get himself hospitalized at the Abarbanel Psychiatric Hospital for four days. The investigation showed that the district psychiatrist was not conducting the necessary tests before ordering forced hospitalization. Following a series of articles published on the subject, an investigation committee was set up by the Ministry of Health, and some of the legal requirements relating to forced hospitalization were changed.

== In the World of Tolerance ==
Kanner promotes a tolerant society through a long and meaningful acquaintance with the other. The Hinam Center that he founded applies this approach through in-depth journeys into the Israeli society where participants live "the lives of others" and spend extended periods of time in various communities in Israeli society (ultra-Orthodox, Arabs, settlers, Ethiopians, etc.). In 2016, President Reuven Rivlin met members of one of the Hinam Center's groups after they completed a four-month journey between communities in Israel. The President noted that this is the way to truly recognize Israeli society in all its forms.

As part of the 71st Independence Day events, the President of the State awarded the Center, which Kanner founded, the Unity Award.
