= Pulsa diNura =

Kabbalistic ceremony invoked to block forgiveness of sin

Pulsa deNura, Pulsa diNura or Pulsa Denoura (Jewish Babylonian Aramaic: פולסא דנורא, romanized: pulsā di-nurā, lit. 'the lash of fire') is a purportedly ancient Kabbalistic ceremony in which the destroying angels are invoked to block heavenly forgiveness of the subject's sins, allegedly causing all the curses named in the Bible to befall him resulting in his death. It is controversial for having been allegedly invoked against several contemporary political figures, including by Yosef Dayan against Yitzhak Rabin before his assassination by the far-right Jew Yigal Amir.

Its historicity has been questioned. Dr. Dov Schwartz of Bar-Ilan University and the Haredi public figure Moshe Yehuda Blau argued in the Haredi magazine Mishpacha that the ceremony has no basis in traditional Judaism and actually originates in the mid-20th century.

== Etymology ==
Pulsā, plural: pulsē, is an Aramaic noun derived from the Latin word pulsus "blow, stroke". Nurā is an Aramaic noun meaning "the fire."

== Sources ==
The phrase pulsa dinura appears in several stories in classical rabbinic literature, though not in the context of a mystical curse:

- A restless sinner told Rabbi Akiva that angels were beating him with a stick of fire in punishment for his sins; upon which Rabbi Akiva found the sinner's son, educated him, and in that son's merit the father was spared.
- God punished the angel Metatron with pulsei denura for having misled Elisha ben Abuyah.
- God punished the angel Gabriel with pulsei denura for lacking the sensitivity to abbreviate his report on his part in the destruction of Jerusalem.
- Elijah was punished in heaven with pulsei denura for having disclosed a heavenly secret to humankind.
- Rava said that if Levi ben Sisi were alive, he would strike with pulsei denura another rabbi who had misrepresented his opinion.
- The term is mentioned once in the Zohar, where it is described as a heavenly punishment against a person who does not fulfill their religious obligations.

Some adherents of Kabbalah developed the idea of invoking a curse against a sinner, which they termed pulsa deNura. The source for this modern ritual is not to be found in Kabbalah, but among the Hebrew magical manuals of antiquity, such as Sefer HaRazim and The Sword of Moses.

== Recent usage ==
Accusations of the use of this curse by religious Jews against Jewish figures who have committed major transgressions has been made often over the past 50 years and quoted mostly in Israeli media. As the saying goes in Israel "you have not made it in Israeli politics until you've been cursed by the Pulsa DiNura."

Early in the 20th century, Haredi Jews in Jerusalem were accused by the media of having recited the curse against the linguist Eliezer Ben Yehuda. However, there is no proof of the curse being performed before 1948.

There have been unsubstantiated media reports of the curse being recited against archaeologists and authors.

Prior to the assassination of Israeli prime minister Yitzhak Rabin, there were reports that the curse had been recited against him. On 26 February 2012, Tamar Yonah of Arutz Sheva interviewed Yosef Dayan, who, with rabbinical guidance, was involved in the Pulsa DiNura of Yitzhak Rabin and Ariel Sharon.

Avigdor Eskin, a member of the Gush Emunim ("Bloc of the Faithful"), claimed to have recited the following maledictions of the Pulsa diNura on the night of 2 October 1995:

Regarding that Yitzchak son of Rosa, called Rabin, we have permission from the angels of destruction... to kill him on account of his inciting the holy people and transferring the Land of Israel to our enemies...

This was preceded by a similar ceremony in Safed. Rabin was assassinated within the month by an Israeli ultranationalist named Yigal Amir.

In July 2005, the Israeli media, without citing sources, reported that opponents of the Israeli disengagement from Gaza recited the Pulsa deNura in the old cemetery of Rosh Pina, asking the "Angel of Death" to kill Israeli Prime Minister Ariel Sharon. Six months later Sharon suffered two strokes and was in a coma, fighting for his life, until his death on 11 January 2014. However, most analysts link this to his age (77) and obesity.

On 7 November 2006, the Edah HaChareidis said it was considering placing the curse on the organizers of the pride parade scheduled to march in Jerusalem on 10 November 2006. Army Radio interviewed Rabbi Shmuel Papenheim, who announced, "The Rabbinical Court has held a special session and discussed placing a 'pulsa denura' on those who have had a hand in organizing the march." Papenheim, editor of the Haredi religious umbrella organization's weekly magazine, added that the rabbis were also considering placing the curse "against the policemen who beat Haredi Jews".

On 1 June 2021, The Times of Israel reported that a member of the Health Ministry panel that had been advising on COVID-19 vaccinations received death threats including the Pulsa DiNura during the process of approval for the inoculation of children.

On 10 June 2021, Naftali Bennett, leader of the Yamina party and prime minister designate in the incoming national unity government, reportedly received a letter stating that the Pulsa DiNura had been invoked against him in 2013. The letter was unsigned but reportedly referenced ultra-Orthodox rabbis.

On 12 August 2022, Ukrainian Jewish oligarch Hennadiy Korban said he has performed the Pulsa Denura "death curse" against Russian President Vladimir Putin.

As of June 2026, some Edah Haredit members are actively considering invoking the curse against Israel's Attorney General, Gali Baharav-Miara, amidst ongoing tensions related to proposed military draft laws targeting Haredim.

== See also ==
- Herem (censure)
- Rodef
- Jewish superstition
