= Incitement (film) =

2019 film

- Film poster
- ימים נוראים
- Directed by: Yaron Zilberman
- Written by: Ron Leshem; Yaron Zilberman; Yair Hizmi
- Starring: Yehuda Nahari Halevi
- Cinematography: Amit Yasur
- Edited by: Shira Arad; Yonatan Weinstein
- Music by: Raz Mesinai
- Release dates: 7 September 2019 (TIFF); 26 September 2019 (Israel)
- Running time: 123 minutes
- Country: Israel
- Language: Hebrew
- Box office: $140,306

Incitement (Hebrew: ימים נוראים, lit. 'Days of Awe [a Hebrew phrase used to for the High Holy Days]') is a 2019 Israeli thriller film directed by Yaron Zilberman. It was screened in the Contemporary World Cinema section at the 2019 Toronto International Film Festival. The film was written by Ron Leshem alongside Zilberman, and Yair Hizmi. At the film's world premiere at the Toronto International Film Festival, the screening was halted and the audience had to evacuate because of a security threat. The screening resumed when the cinema showing the film was determined to be safe. It received the 2019 Ophir Award for Best Picture and was selected as the Israeli entry for the Best International Feature Film at the 92nd Academy Awards.

== Plot ==
The film follows a year in the life of Yigal Amir, ending with his assassination of Yitzhak Rabin. Amir (Yehuda Nahari) attends the night funeral in Kiryat Arba, near Hebron, of Baruch Goldstein, whom Amir regards as someone who carried out God's will after the massacre at a mosque.

Following the signing of the Oslo Accords between Rabin and Yasser Arafat in 1993, violence and terrorist attacks continue in Hebron and Kiryat Arba, resulting in deaths. Secular leaders of the right-wing opposition, including Ariel Sharon and Benjamin Netanyahu, describe Rabin as a "traitor". Some rabbis debate whether Rabin can be considered a rodef ("persecutor"), stopping short of directly calling for his assassination while making suggestive statements such as, "Those who understand will understand." The film's title, Incitement, emphasizes Amir's visits to various rabbis as he seeks religious approval for killing Rabin.

At the same time, Amir, a student at Bar-Ilan University, organizes free Saturday tours of Israeli settlements for his fellow students. His father (Amitai Yaish), portrayed as one of the film's most sympathetic and intelligent characters, holds humanistic views that fail to change his son's beliefs.

Another storyline follows Nava (Daniela Kertesz), an Ashkenazi student who lives in the settlement of Psagot and is courted by Amir. Her storyline reveals the polite but condescending attitude of her family toward Yemeni Jews. Nava rejects Amir and soon marries his best friend, who comes from a privileged Ashkenazi family.

However, Amir's rejection by Nava is not presented as the main reason for his decision to become an assassin. Even before she rejects him, he has already planned to form a militia against Palestinians. His actions are driven by political anger combined with dangerous racist beliefs.

Amir's plumber brother (Yoav Levi) suggests using water pressure to propel explosives into Rabin's apartment. In the end, however, Amir chooses the simplest, most frightening, and most effective plan: to assassinate Rabin himself.

== Cast ==
- Yehuda Nahari Halevi as Yigal Amir
- Amitai Yaish as Shlomo Amir
- Anat Ravnitzki as Geula Amir
- Yoav Levi as Hagai Amir
- Daniella Kertesz as Nava
- Sivan Mast as Margalit Har-Shefi
- Dolev Ohana as Dror Adani
- Omer Perelman Striks as Wineberg

== Reception ==
On the review aggregator website Rotten Tomatoes, 96% of 26 critics' reviews are positive, with an average rating of 7.7/10. The website's consensus reads: "Incitement explores Yigal Amir's complex descent into becoming a radicalized assassin and delivers a taut thriller that's hard to shake."

== See also ==
- List of submissions to the 92nd Academy Awards for Best International Feature Film
- List of Israeli submissions for the Academy Award for Best International Feature Film
