= Dror Adani =

Israeli co-conspirator in Yitzhak Rabin murder

- דרור עדני
- Criminal charges: Conspiracy to commit murder; Unlawful production of weapons; Unlawful possession of weapons
- Penalty: 6 years imprisonment

Details
- Imprisoned at: Ohale Kedar

Dror Adani (Hebrew: דרור עדני) was convicted with Yigal Amir and Hagai Amir in conspiring to murder Israeli Prime Minister Yitzhak Rabin. He was also convicted for conspiring to attack Arabs, illegal weapon production, and illegal weapon possession.

At the time, Dror Adani studied at a yeshiva in the Israeli West Bank settlement Beit Hagai. In his verdict, it is mentioned that Adani turned to a rabbi to receive an opinion that Yitzhak Rabin can be killed under the din rodef halakhic law - which allows, for example, abortion when a woman's life is in danger by her pregnancy. He received a negative response.

Dror Adani served his prison term in the Beersheba prison Ohale Kedar. Throughout his sentence and his term, he kept denying the charges of which he was convicted. In 2000, his request to be released after 2/3 of his prison term failed. Instead, he was released in July 2002 after completing his entire term. Upon his release, he called himself the "Dreyfus of 2000". He told the press he intended to get married and have children. He would keep away from politics in the future. In 2005, he lived in Petah Tikva and worked as an electrician.
