= Yosef Dayan =

Mexican-Israeli Orthodox rabbi

Yosef Dayan יוסף דיין
- Rabbi
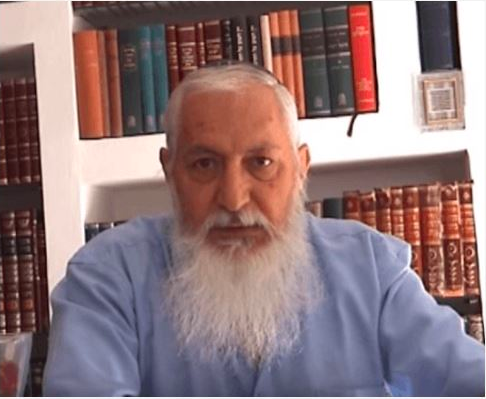
- Born: Josef ben Avraham; 1945 (age 80–81); Mexico
- Issue: Hananel Dayan-Meged
- Father: Avraham

Yosef Dayan (Hebrew: יוסף דיין; born 1945) is a Mexican-Israeli Orthodox rabbi, author and right-wing Israeli monarchist and nationalist, who claims to be the most senior heir to the Davidic line. He is the founder and director of Malchut Israel, a religious right-wing political party which advocates for a monarchy in Israel. In 2004, Dayan became a founding member of the newly reconstituted Sanhedrin.

== Early life and background ==
Yosef Dayan was born in 1945 in Mexico to Sephardic Jewish parents from Aleppo, Syria, where the Dayan family had lived for some seven hundred years. Dayan's family trace their ancestry in a direct paternal line to the Exilarchs of Mesopotamia, who in part were direct paternal descendants of the Davidic line. He and his family paternally descend from Josiah al-Hasan ben Zakkai (d. 940), the younger brother of the Exilarch David ben Zakkai (d. 940), whose genealogy is recounted in the rabbinic work Seder Olam Zutta which traces the line of the Exliarchs back to David.

One of Hasan's descendants, Solomon ben Azariah the Nasi, settled in Aleppo where the family became dayanim (judges) of the city and thus assumed the surname Dayan.

== Dynastic claims ==
In 1933, Yitzak Dayan, a cousin of Yosef Dayan's father was considered by some Orthodox rabbis to be the heir and titular "King of Israel".

== Politics ==
Dayan later founded "Malchut Israel," a right-wing religious-political group in Israel advocating a return to the monarchy. In 2004, he became a member of the newly reconstituted Sanhedrin, a duplicate of the religious tribunal which convened during the time of the Second Temple. The Sanhedrin had traditionally had 71 members. He is alleged to have participated in so-called "death curse" ceremonies or Pulsa diNura aimed at Yitzhak Rabin and Ariel Sharon, presumably requesting divine retribution after those former prime ministers advocated Israeli withdrawal from Palestinian areas considered by Zionists to be parts of the Promised Land.

His son, Hananel Dayan-Meged, refused to shake the hand of Dan Halutz, the (former) Chief of Staff of the Israeli Defence Force, while receiving the "President of Israel Excellence Citation" during the Israeli Independence Day celebrations.

== Books ==
Yosef Dayan is the author of several books in Hebrew, Spanish, and Italian and has worked to translate modern Spanish literature into Hebrew.
