= Roni Daniel =

Israeli journalist (1947–2021)

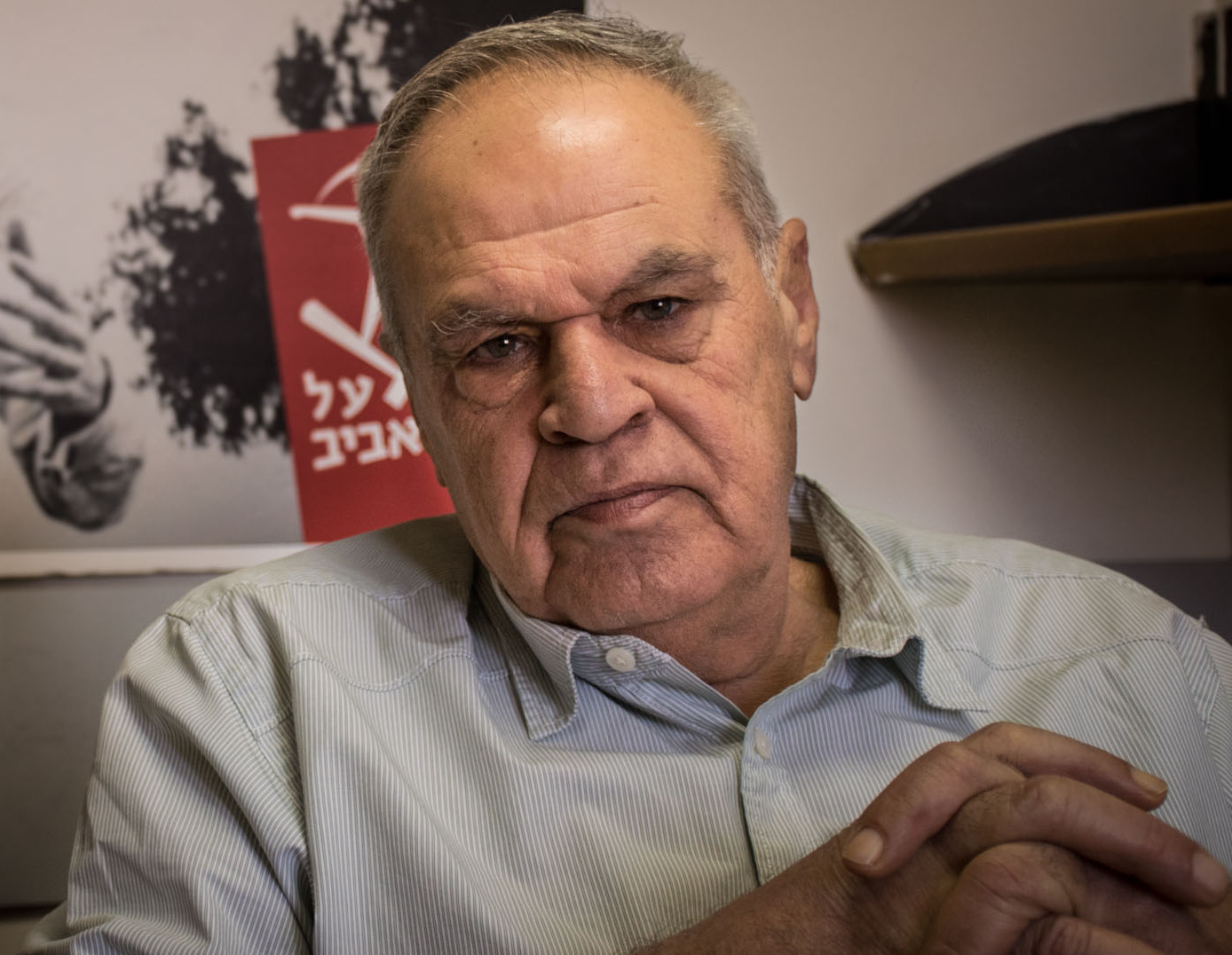
Roni Daniel, 2016

Roni Daniel (Hebrew: רוני דניאל; October 29, 1947 - July 26, 2021) was an Israeli correspondent and commentator on military and security affairs for Israeli news channels. Throughout his professional career as a journalist, he worked in a number of media outlets, including Kol Yisrael, Galei Tzahal and the news company, where he worked from its establishment in 1993 until his death.

== Biography ==
Daniel was born in Baghdad, Iraq. His father died when he was two months old. In 1950, at the age of three, he immigrated to Israel with his mother. He grew up in Kibbutz Maoz Haim and was a supporter of Ahdut HaAvodah.

In October 1965, he enlisted in the IDF, in the 906th Battalion of the Nahal. Passed a training course as a soldier, an infantry cadet course and an infantry officer course. At the end of the course, he returned to the Nahal and became a platoon commander. During the Six Day War, he fought at the Battle of Umm Katf on the Egyptian front, was wounded by shrapnel but returned to the front. In the late 1960s he became a company commander and fought in the War of Attrition. During the Yom Kippur War, Kol Yisrael accompanied the 51st Battalion in a desert operation. Later, he was appointed by Yoram Yair as the commander of a reserve battalion of the Golani Brigade, later serving as a battalion commander 9217 in the Negev Brigade and as a lieutenant colonel in the reserve. Daniel was a lieutenant colonel in the reserve.

=== Journalist career ===
Daniel joined Kol Yisrael in 1971 as a reporter for transportation and agriculture. He soon became a military correspondent. In 1977 he was included in the Voice of Israel delegation to Egypt. [9] At the end of 1980 he underwent training at the CBS radio station in New York. [10] From 1982 to 1984, he served as head of the news division in Tel Aviv. In 1983, he was reprimanded by the director general of the Israel Broadcasting Authority, Yosef Lapid, following an incident he had with reporter Miron Tzur. He also worked for Galey Tzahal. During the Yom Kippur War, the reporters were the first to ascend Mount Hermon with Golani fighters. In 1992–1993, Daniel was one of the hosts of the program "Communication Portfolio" on educational television. From 1993 until his death, he was the Channel 2 news correspondent for military and security affairs.

During Operation Cast Lead, Daniel refused to abandon the Channel 2 broadcast station in Sderot when a "red color" alarm was heard live, contrary to the instructions of his superiors, explaining that "I am here to broadcast and not run away from the screen in times of distress." During the same operation, Daniel allegedly violated the instructions of the military censorship, when he reported on the expected timing of the opening of the ground campaign. On the same case, Daniel said:

I admit and confess that I was close to going home. I thought to myself that if, because of this knowledge, our forces were exposed in their way, I would resign. Carrying on my conscience that someone was hurt because of me? ... When it became clear to me that the broadcast did not reveal anything, a huge stone was rolled over my heart. In July 2009, Daniel published a 5-episode documentary series that followed cadets in the 1st Battalion.

In his commentary, Daniel took a hawkish line, such as in Operation Eitan, which supported the IDF's ground entry into the Gaza Strip.

In the years 2018–2021, he broadcast a current affairs program on 103FM radio - "The Cabinet" - together with Alon Ben-David and Yoav Limor, in which they talked about political, security, sports and more.

In March 2019, he criticized Israeli Prime Minister Benjamin Netanyahu after the Likud campaign mocked the sight of Abramovich being wounded in the Yom Kippur War and burned in the face, Daniel said that "mocking Amnon Abramovich for his scars - one of the lowest things I have seen." In addition, he criticized his behavior toward IDF disabled people and said that if he himself had been an IDF disabled person, he would not have agreed to his visit. "If I had been lying in this bed, I would have gotten up and left the room."

=== Criticism of his work as a journalist ===
His critics on the left, including journalist Gideon Levy, protested that he claimed to have actually served as an IDF spokesman rather than an investigative reporter, and reported events in a selectively convenient manner for IDF authorities and sometimes even adopted the army's official line. Daniel denied this in an interview with Yedioth Ahronoth, noting that he harshly criticized the defense establishment during the suicide bombings in Israel that preceded Operation Defensive Shield, as well as during the Second Lebanon War.

In August 2010, Daniel and Amnon Abramovich unveiled the "Galant Document," later known as the Harpaz Document. In July 2012, it became known that State Comptroller Micha Lindenstrauss had complained to the Second Authority about Daniel's conduct in covering the Harpaz affair. The Public Inquiry Commissioner in the Second Authority dismissed the complaint.

== Personal life ==
Daniel was married to Shlomit and the father of three children. Ari, his son, died in 1987 at the age of 13, after an acute asthma attack.

On July 26, 2021, he died of a heart attack at the age of 73 at his home in the Ramat Aviv III neighbourhood of Tel Aviv and was buried in the Kiryat Shaul cemetery.
