= Shira Arad =

Israeli film editor and actress (born 1972)

- שירה ארד
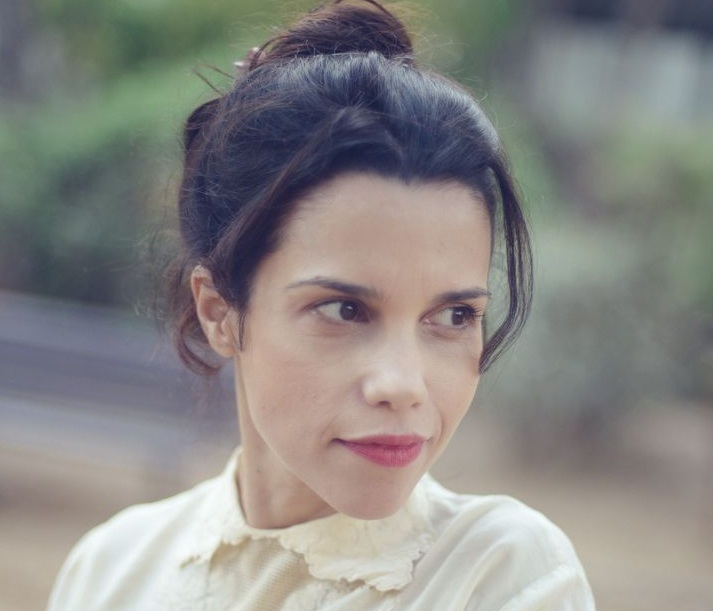
- Born: July 4, 1972 (age 53)
- Occupations: Film editor; musical supervisor

Shira Arad (Hebrew: שירה ארד, born July 4, 1972) is an Israeli film editor and musical supervisor. She is a former DJ and TV actress. In 2016 she received the Ophir Award for Best Film Editing, for the movie Our Father. Since 2020 Arad is a member of the European Film Academy.

== Early career ==
Arad studied acting at The Poor School in London, graduating in 1995. In that same year she was the assistant director of Hanoch Levin in the play Beheading at Habimah Theatre.

She began her acting career in the play The Physicists at the Left Bank theatre. She later performed in the play The Crucible at the Habimah Theatre, directed by Shmulik Hasfari (1999), and in the play My Kinneret at the Beersheba Theater (2002-2002).

At the same time, Arad appeared in various children's programs on Channel One. In 1999, she played in the Israeli film Yana's Friends, directed by Arik Kaplun. In 2001 she played in the Israeli telenovela Touching Happiness, in which she played Karin. In the same year she played in the series Closed File, written by Reshef Levi.

In 2001, Arad began working as a DJ and music supervisor. In 2008, she was the music researcher for the feature Borat starring Sacha Baron Cohen.

Arad currently works as a film editor. In 2013 she participated in the Berlinale Talent Campus of the Berlin International Film Festival.

In 2005, Arad married singer Kobi Oz. In 2009 they divorced.

== Cinematic career ==
In 2009, Arad participated in the DocChallenge competition as part of the DocAviv Festival and won the editing prize for the documentary The Walking Man directed by Noam Pinchas.

In 2011, she edited Li At Glick's film Bright Night, which participated in the Berlin International Film Festival.

Arad edited Heder 514, directed by Sharon Bar-Ziv in 2012. The film was nominated for six prizes at film festivals around the world, and won a special mention at the Tribeca Film Festival, and the Best Director at the Granada Film Festival, Cines del Sur.

In 2013, Arad edited Mind the Gap, a short film by Tom Darom, which won the Best Film Award at the Impro Festival, and participated in the Haifa Film Festival 2013. Another short film Michtav MeHaAvar (A Letter from the Past) by Ofer Zingerman was nominated for the 2014 Ophir Awards.

Between the years 2010-2014, Arad served as editor of promos and video works for various productions at the Gesher Theater, and performed multimedia for Kreutzer Sonata directed by Yevgeny Aryeh, and Falling Out of Time directed by Yehezkel Lazarov.

In 2015 she edited two feature films: Meni Yaesh's second film, Our Father, and Arik Rothstein's first film, Antenna.

In September 2016, she won the Ophir Award for Best Film Editing for editing Our Father. In October 2016, she won the editing prize for Antenna at the Haifa International Film Festival.

In 2018 she edited the documentary film "Family in Transition" which won the prize for best film at the DocAviv Festival.

In 2019 Arad edited the feature film Incitement, a psychological thriller detailing the year leading to the assassination of Israel's Prime Minister, Yitzhak Rabin, from the point of view of the assassin. The film received the 2019 Ophir Award for Best Picture, and was selected as the Israeli entry for the Best International Feature Film at the 92nd Academy Awards.

In 2020 Arad was chosen to be part of the European Film Academy. She is the first Israeli film editor to be invited to the academy.

In 2021, Shira edited the mini-series, "After Midnight: The Darkest Secret in Town", by Keren Shayo. Shira was nominated for Best Picture Editing in the 2022 Israeli Academy Awards for her work on the series.

In 2023, Shira edited the documentary film "Poliker: The Child Within Me". The film opened the DocAviv International Film Festival and was nominated for the Best Documentary Award in the Israeli Academy Awards 2023. It also won the audience choice awards for Best Documentary in the Israeli Film Festival in LA, 2024. Shira was both editor and co-writer of this film.
