= Superstition in Judaism =

Superstition in Judaism refers to the credulous beliefs in the supernatural present in Judaism and Jewish culture. Judaism, unlike many of its contemporaries, lacks the framework for superstitious belief and often condemns it. Because idolatry was deeply connected to Canaanite and Bronze Age superstition, the Torah specifically warns against believing in lucky numbers and superstitious signs, as it can lead people away from God. However, following the Jewish diaspora, some Jewish communities partially adopted the superstitious customs of their neighbours.

== Talmudic era ==
With the absolute acceptance of monotheism in the Talmudic era, superstition lost its idolatrous character and was no longer seen as a large threat, as it was in the Biblical era. That being said, superstition still remained a taboo, especially in communities in Babylon where superstition was pervasive. Many Tannaim and even Gaonim, implemented prohibitory laws against superstition, mostly in regards to shechita and marriage. Rav Ḥanina, for instance, answered a woman who desired to bewitch him stating that "It is written, There is none else beside Him'". In other words, Rav Hanina stated that the women's superstitious beliefs were foolish seeing as God has the final say in all things. The Talmud does however, contain some superstitious beliefs, in Pesachim 111b for example, it states "It is unwise to be between two dogs, two palms, or two women; and it is equally unwise for two men to be separated by one of these" although most Rabbis interpret this not as a superstition but rather to guard against lustful thoughts (see mishnayos in Avot). In Pesachim 111a it states "It is dangerous to borrow a drink of water, or to step over water poured out", and in Hullin 105b it states "Drink not froth, for it gives cold in the head; nor blow it away, for that gives headache; nor get rid of it otherwise, for that brings poverty; but wait until it subsides".

The Evil eye (Hebrew: עין הרע) features prominently in rabbinic writings, one of which teaching saying, "ninety-nine [people] die from the effects of the evil eye (i.e. prematurely), while [only] one dies by the hand of heaven." The wearing of amulets containing the names of angels charged with healing and invocations of various sorts was often thought to be a prophylactic against certain illnesses and the Evil eye. The practice is mentioned in the Mishnah, and in the book, Alpha Beta la-Ben Sira.

== Medieval era ==
In the Middle Ages, Jewish superstition was greatly strengthened, owing in large measure to Christian surroundings, trials for witchcraft were carried out on a regular basis and many superstitious beliefs found themselves being canonized into Medieval law. These ideas found their way into Jewish literature and even in a high degree influenced religious ceremonies. However many Medieval rabbis were fervently against superstition, as they saw it as a form of assimilation and idol worship.

== Modern era ==
In modern times, the widespread belief in superstition has drastically gone down following the Age of Enlightenment. Among some Jewish communities, especially those in Eastern Europe, a plethora of superstitions were common. How far these customs and ideas can be classified as specifically "Jewish" is another and more difficult question. In many cases they can be traced to the habits of their neighbors; in others, while they are common to most other gentile sections of the country.

== See also ==
- Amulet
- Pulsa diNura
- Christian mythology
- Islamic mythology
- Jewish mythology
- Superstitions in Muslim societies
