= Our Father (2016 film) =

2016 film

- Film poster
- Directed by: Meni Yaesh
- Written by: Meni Yaesh
- Starring: Moris Cohen
- Cinematography: Ram Shweky
- Edited by: Shira Arad
- Release date: 5 June 2016
- Running time: 90 minutes
- Country: Israel
- Language: Hebrew

Our Father (Hebrew: Avinu) is a 2016 Israeli drama film directed by Meni Yaesh. It was one of five films nominated for the Best Film Award at the Ophir Awards.

== Plot ==
Ovadia is the best bouncer at a high-profile club in Tel Aviv, Israel. He and his wife Rachel have been trying to have a child for 5 years with no success. To make some money, Ovadia works as a mover on the side. Shalom Rosenthal, a loan shark, persuades Ovadia to collect money for him.

At first, Ovadia excels and Shalom pays him well. With this new money, Ovadia takes Rachel to the best fertility clinic in Israel. On one job Ovadia is supposed to beat up someone that owes money to Shalom he is overcome with emotion and shows mercy.

At a picnic with Shalom, he tells him that he wants to quit and this leads to a brief argument and Ovadia ends up punching Shalom. Shalom's other goons take Ovadia to a bathroom and he is beaten badly. They stop when Ovadia promises to not quit.

On another job, Ovadia opens the back door of the club so Shalom's men can enter and kill Ovadia's boss with whom Mickey is very close. The film ends as Ovadia and Rachel with their newborn.

== Cast ==
- Moris Cohen as Ovadia Rachamim
- Rotem Zissman-Cohen as Rachel Rachmim
- Doron Ben-David as Romano
