= Assassination of Yitzhak Rabin =

1995 murder in Tel Aviv, Israel

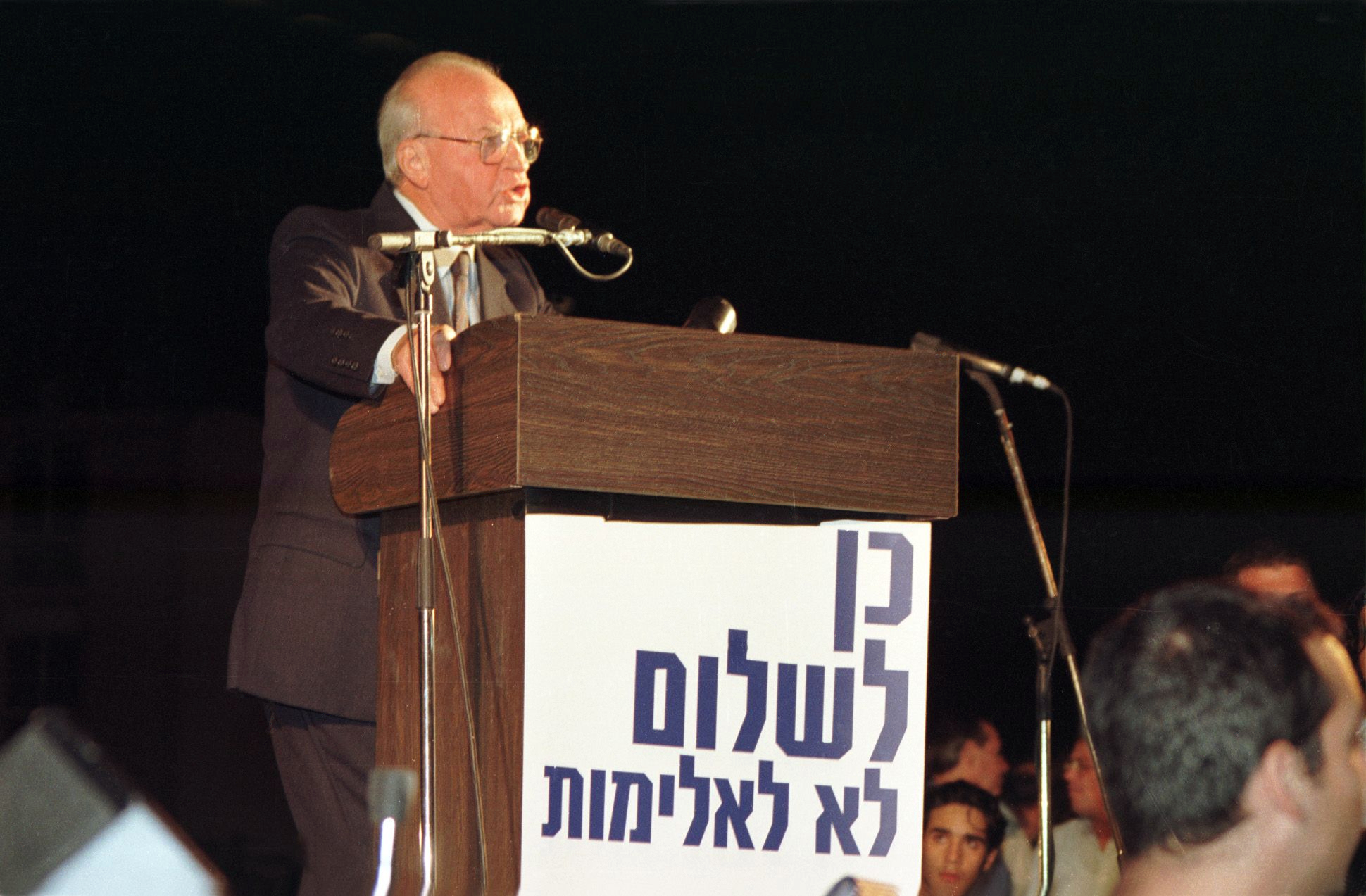
- Rabin speaking at the rally on the night of his assassination
- Location: 32°04′54.8″N 34°46′51.4″E; Tel Aviv, Israel
- Date: November 4, 1995; 9:30 p.m. (IST)
- Target: Yitzhak Rabin
- Attack type: Shooting
- Weapon: Beretta 84F semi-automatic pistol
- Deaths: Yitzhak Rabin
- Injuries: Yoram Rubin
- Perpetrator: Yigal Amir
- Motive: Far-right extremism Rabin signing the Oslo Accords
- Convictions: Murder, conspiracy to commit murder, aggravated injury
- Sentence: Life imprisonment, plus 14 years

Yitzhak Rabin, the prime minister of Israel, was assassinated on 4 November 1995 at 21:30, at the end of a rally in support of the Oslo Accords at Kings of Israel Square in Tel Aviv. The assailant was Yigal Amir, an Israeli law student and far-right ultranationalist who radically opposed the Oslo Accords and Rabin's peace initiative more broadly.

== Background ==
The assassination of Israeli prime minister Yitzhak Rabin came immediately after an anti-violence rally in support of the Oslo peace process.

Before the rally, Rabin was disparaged personally by right-wing conservatives and Likud leaders who perceived the peace process as an attempt to forfeit the occupied territories and a capitulation to Israel's enemies.

National religious conservatives and Likud party leaders believed that withdrawing from any "Jewish" land was blasphemy and heresy. The Likud leader and future prime minister, Benjamin Netanyahu, accused Rabin's government of being "removed from Jewish tradition [...] and Jewish values". Right-wing rabbis associated with the settlers' movement prohibited territorial concessions to the Palestinians and forbade soldiers in the Israel Defense Forces from evacuating Jewish settlers under the accords. Some rabbis proclaimed din rodef, based on a traditional Jewish law of self-defense, against Rabin personally, arguing that the Oslo Accords would endanger Jewish lives.

Rallies organized by Likud and other right-wing groups featured depictions of Rabin in a Nazi SS uniform, or in the crosshairs of a gun. Protesters compared the Labor party (which Rabin led) to the Nazis and Rabin to Adolf Hitler and chanted, "Rabin is a murderer" and "Rabin is a traitor". In July 1995, Netanyahu led a mock funeral procession featuring a coffin and hangman's noose at an anti-Rabin rally where protesters chanted, "Death to Rabin". The chief of internal security, Carmi Gillon, then alerted Netanyahu of a plot on Rabin's life and asked him to moderate the protests' rhetoric, which Netanyahu declined to do. Netanyahu denied any intention to incite violence.

Rabin dismissed such protests or labeled them chutzpah. According to Gillon, Rabin refused his requests to wear a bulletproof vest and preferred not to use the armored car purchased for him. Left-wing supporters organized pro-peace rallies in support of the Oslo Accords. It was after one such gathering in Tel Aviv that the assassination took place.

=== Yigal Amir and din rodef ===
I did not commit the act to stop the peace process, because there is no such thing. It is a process of war, and the murder was my obligation according to religious law.

— Yigal Amir, 1995

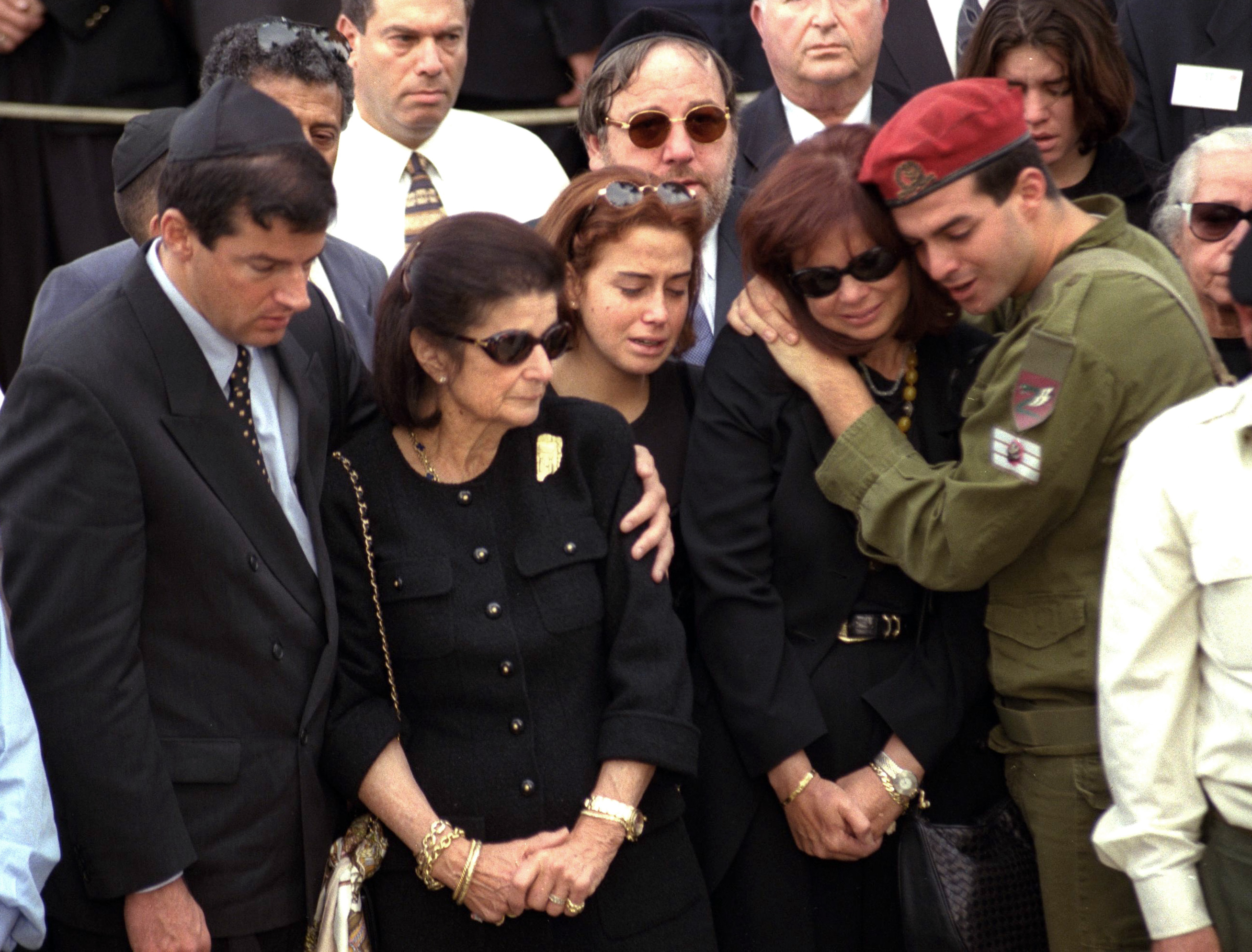
Rabin's family mourn at his funeral

The perpetrator was Yigal Amir, a 25-year-old former Hesder student and far-right law student at Bar-Ilan University. Amir had strenuously opposed Rabin's peace initiative, particularly the signing of the Oslo Accords, because he felt that an Israeli withdrawal from the West Bank would deny Jews their "biblical heritage which they had reclaimed by establishing settlements". Amir had come to believe that Rabin was a rodef, meaning a "pursuer" who endangered Jewish lives. The concept of din rodef ("law of the pursuer") is a part of traditional Jewish law. Amir believed he would be justified under din rodef in removing Rabin as a threat to Jews in the territories.

In the Israeli settlements, pamphlets debating the validity of applying din rodef and din moser ("law of the informer") to Rabin and the Oslo Accords were distributed at synagogues. Both carried a death sentence according to traditional Halakhic law. There was disagreement among religious Zionists as to whether Amir ever secured authorization from a rabbi to carry out the assassination of Rabin. His father later said that in the months before the assassination, Amir repeatedly "said that the prime minister should be killed because a din rodef was issued against him". During his later trial, Amir stated: "I acted according to din rodef. ... It was not a personal act, I just wanted [Rabin] to be removed from his position".

For his radical activities, Yigal Amir had been brought under attention by the Israeli internal security service (Shin Bet), but the organization only had information on Amir's attempt on creating an anti-Arab militia, not on comments regarding assassinating Rabin, which he openly stated to a number of people. Another incident describing Amir's comments to a fellow student about stating the vidui prior to an earlier, aborted attempt on his life was ignored by the organization as "non-credible". The source refused to refer to Amir by name but instead described him as a "short Yemeni guy with curly hair".

== Preceding rally ==
In response to the intense street protests by right-wing opponents of the Oslo peace process, a coalition of left-wing parties and peace groups organized a rally in support of the peace process at Tel Aviv's Kings Square on 4 November 1995. Rabin attended the rally, along with others such as Minister of Foreign Affairs Shimon Peres. The rally attracted a crowd in excess of 100,000 people. In his remarks at the rally, Rabin declared, "I always believed that most of the people want peace and are ready to take a risk for it."

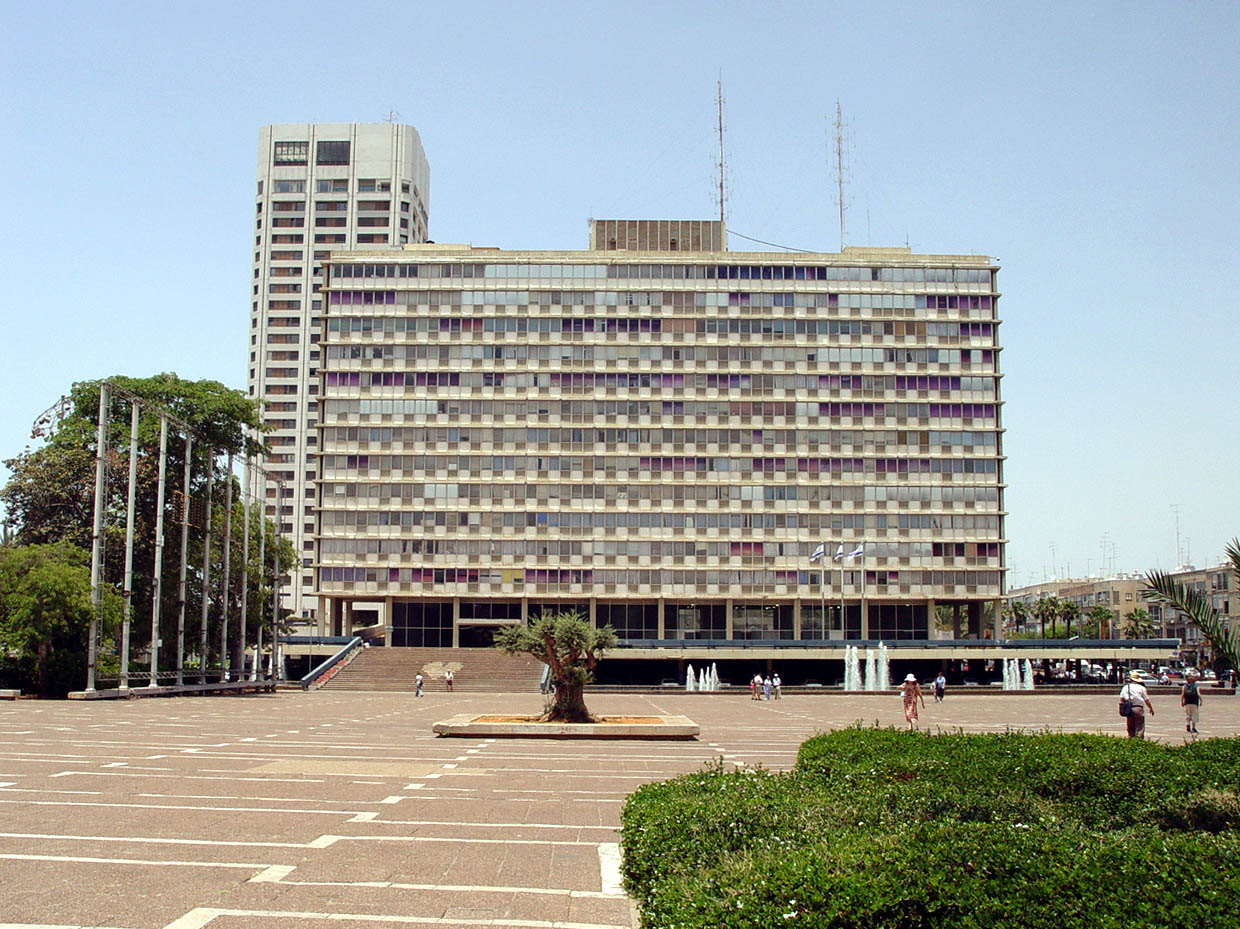
Site of the rally before the assassination: Kings of Israel Square with Tel Aviv City Hall in the background.

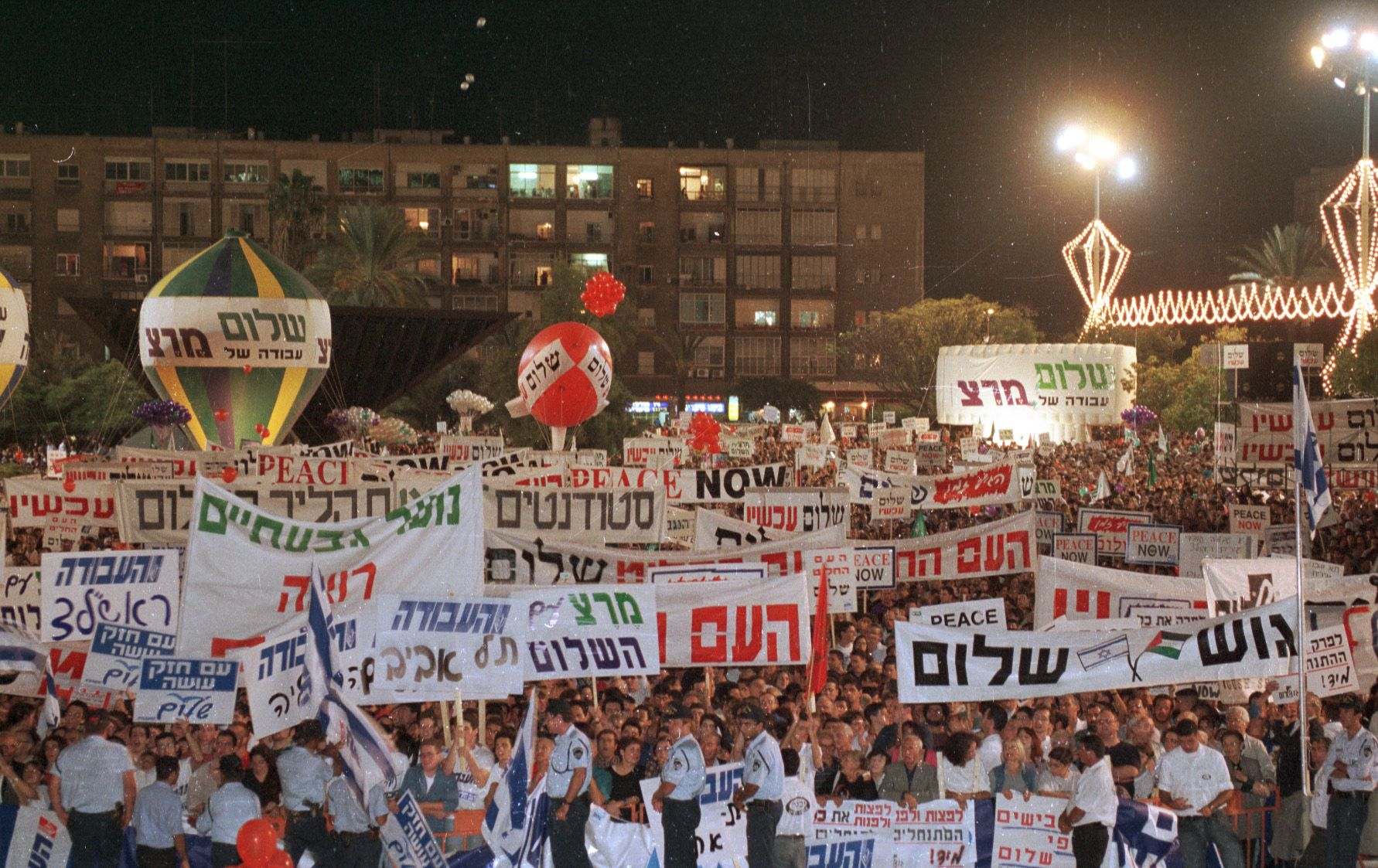
A portion of the crowd assembled at the rally

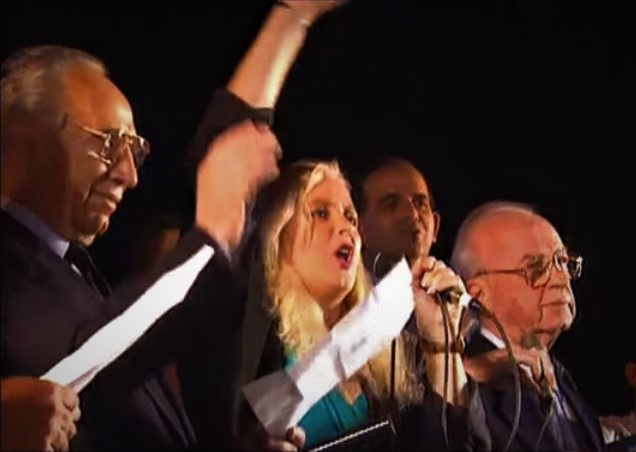
Minister of Foreign Affairs Shimon Peres (far left), singer Miri Aloni, and Prime Minister Rabin (far right) during the rally

== Assassination ==
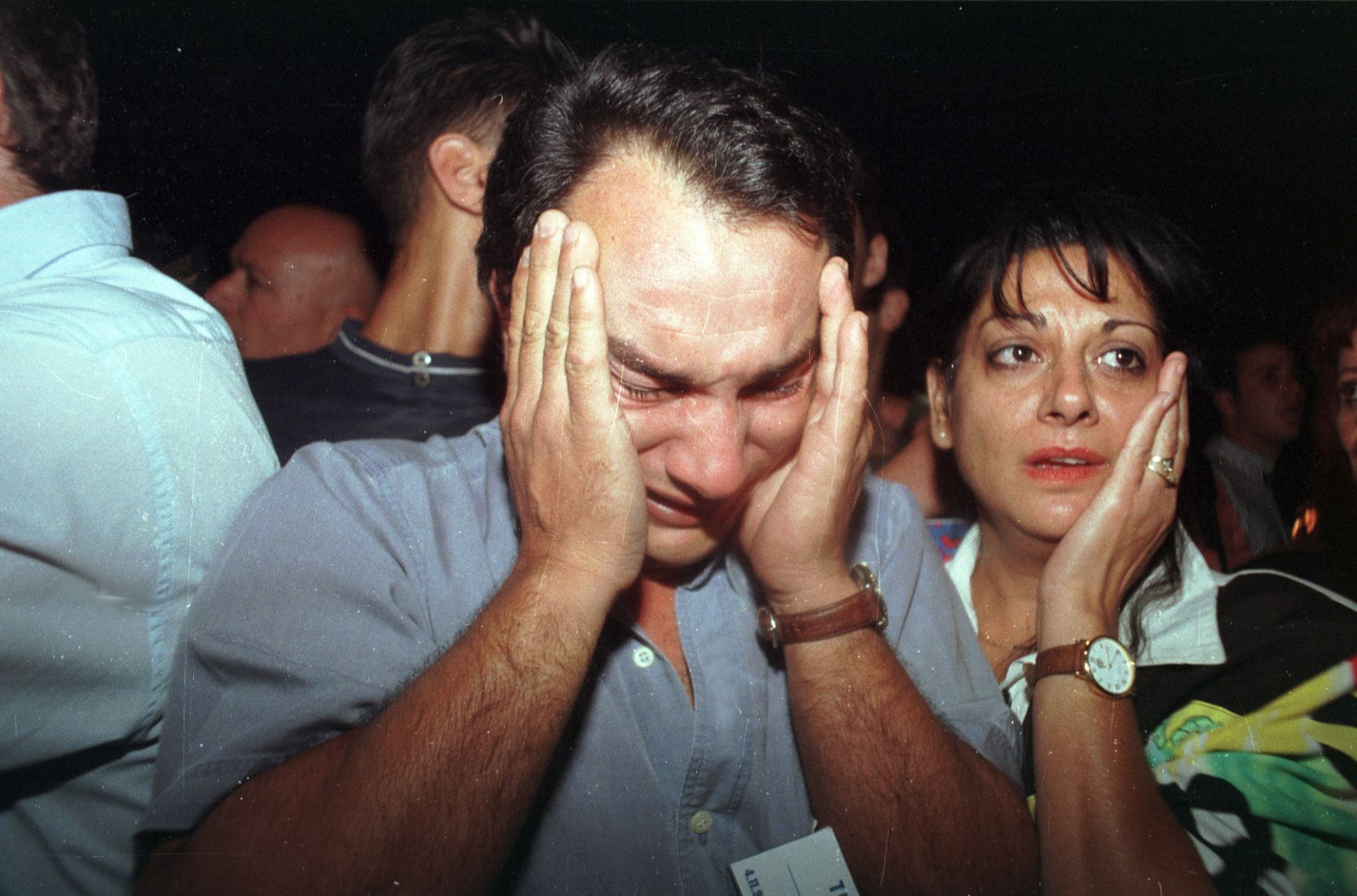
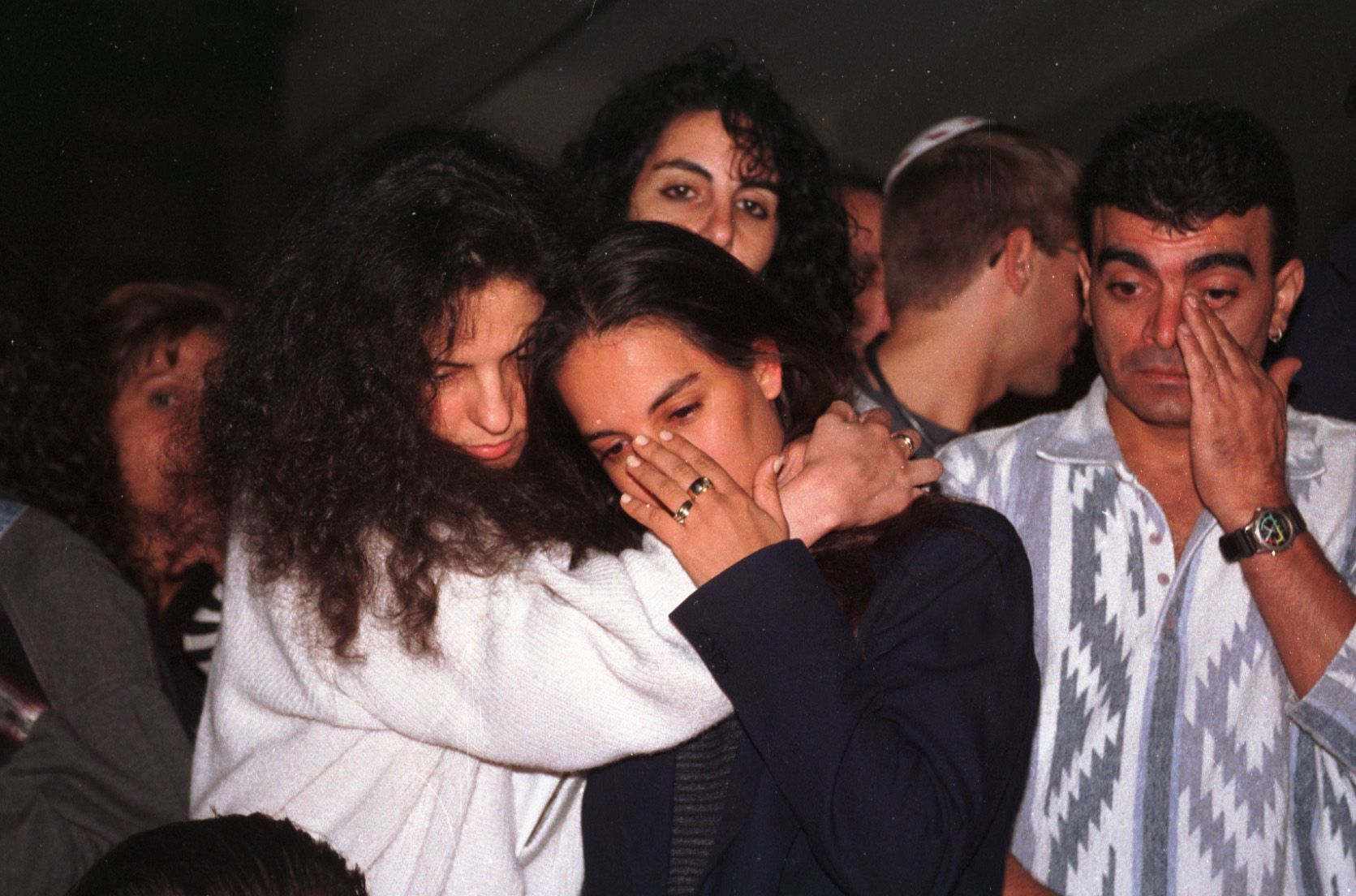
Members of the crowd of supporters that had gathered in Tel Aviv expressing grief upon learning of Rabin's death
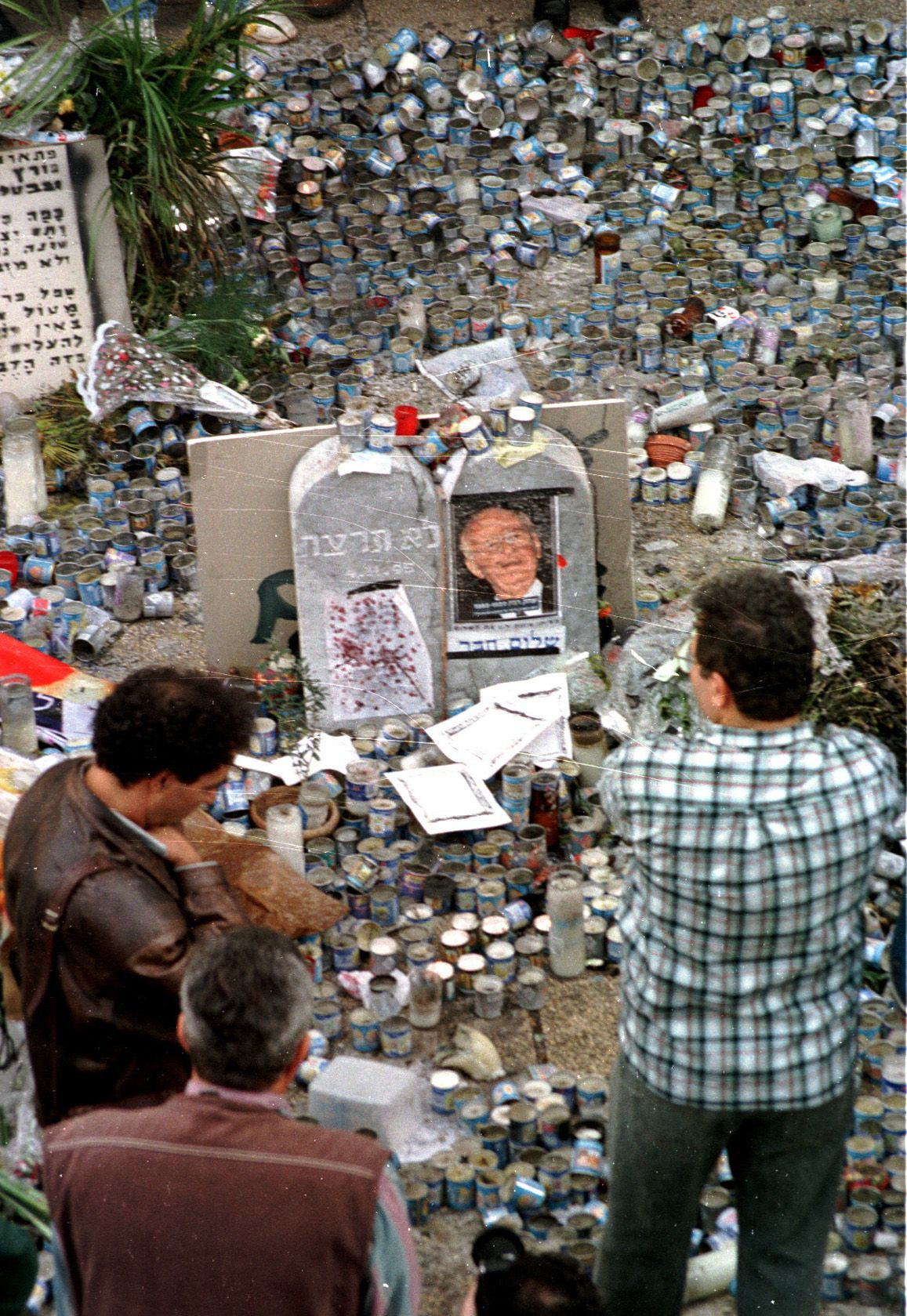
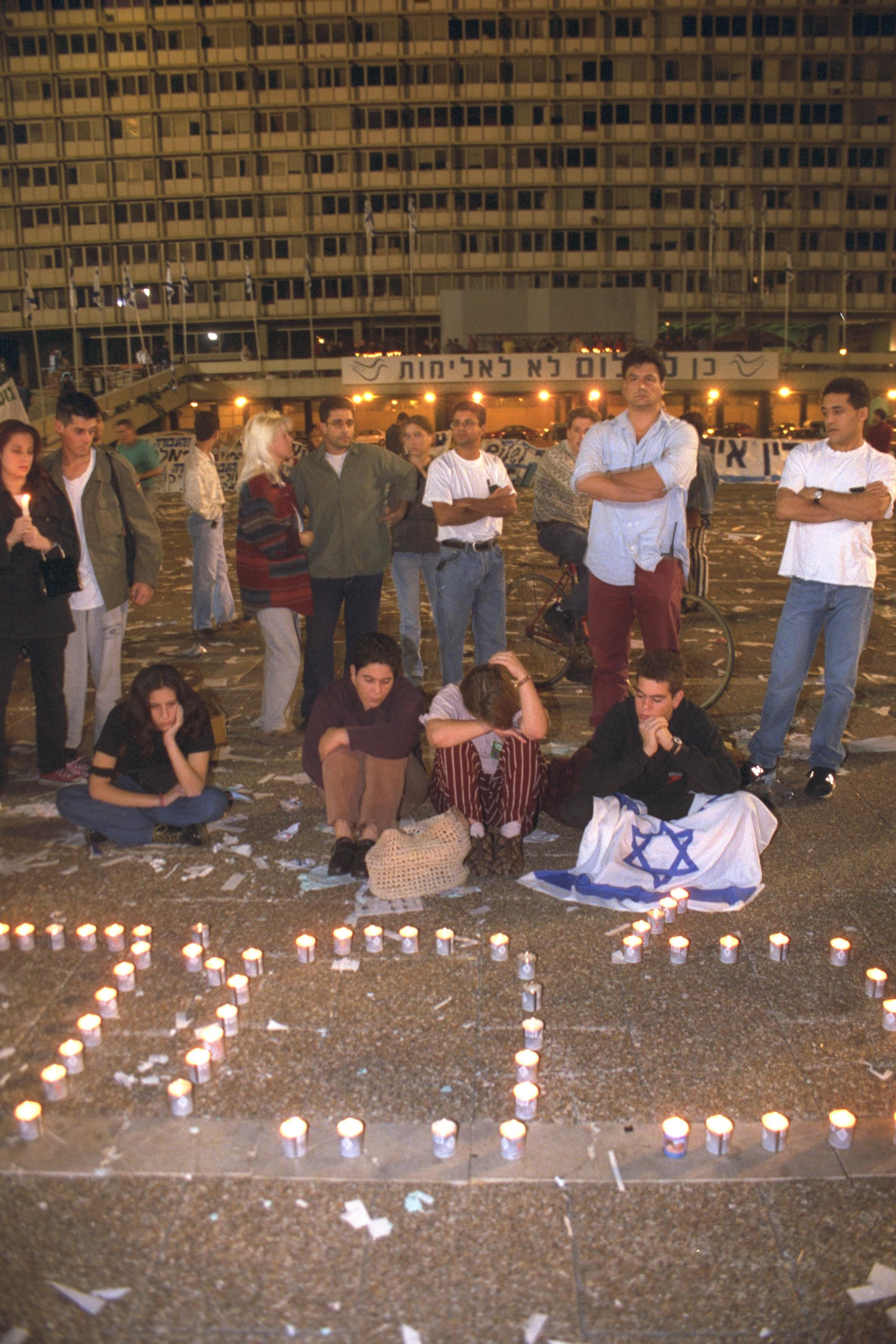
Vigils for Rabin in the square where the rally had been held

After the rally, Rabin walked down the city hall steps towards his car. As he entered the car, Amir approached the car from the rear and fired two shots at Rabin with a Beretta 84F semi-automatic pistol. Rabin was hit in the abdomen and chest. Amir was immediately subdued by Rabin's bodyguards and police on the scene, and fired a third shot at bodyguard Yoram Rubin during the struggle, lightly wounding him. Amir was arrested on the scene with the murder weapon. He was taken to a police station a few blocks away.

Yoram Rubin attempted to get Rabin in the car but Rabin's body was "limp and heavy". Another of Rabin's bodyguards, Shai Glaser, helped put Rabin in the backseat of the car. The driver, Menachem Damati, was ordered to proceed to Ichilov Hospital at the Tel Aviv Sourasky Medical Center, a short drive away. Damati became disoriented by the hysteria of the shooting and the crowds that lined the streets, and as a result lost his bearing. Rabin, who was bleeding heavily, was initially conscious and said that he thought he'd been hurt but not too badly before passing out. Damati drove frantically trying to find the hospital, running red lights and swerving to avoid pedestrians. When he spotted a police officer, Pinchas Terem, he ordered him to get in the vehicle and direct him to the hospital. Two minutes later at 9:52 pm, some ten minutes after the shooting, the car arrived at Ichilov Hospital.

At this time, Rabin was not breathing and had no pulse. Doctors performed an initial examination, attached Rabin to an IV, and drained the air that had seeped into his right chest cavity with a tube inserted into his ribcage. After the air was drained from Rabin's chest, his pulse reappeared. He then underwent surgery. Meanwhile, cabinet ministers, military officers, security officials, and family members of Rabin arrived at the hospital, as did Rabin's Chief of Staff Eitan Haber. After Israeli media reported the shooting, a crowd of spectators and journalists began to gather in front of the hospital. At one point, the doctors managed to briefly stabilize his vital signs, and after being informed, Haber told a high-ranking Defense Ministry official to begin preparations for setting up a makeshift office at the hospital with telephones and fax lines to enable Rabin to continue his work as Prime Minister while recuperating. However, Rabin's condition rapidly deteriorated again. After his heart stopped, a surgeon carried out a cardiac massage in a last-ditch attempt to save him. At 11:02 pm, one hour and thirty-two minutes after the shooting, doctors gave up their efforts to revive Rabin and pronounced him dead.

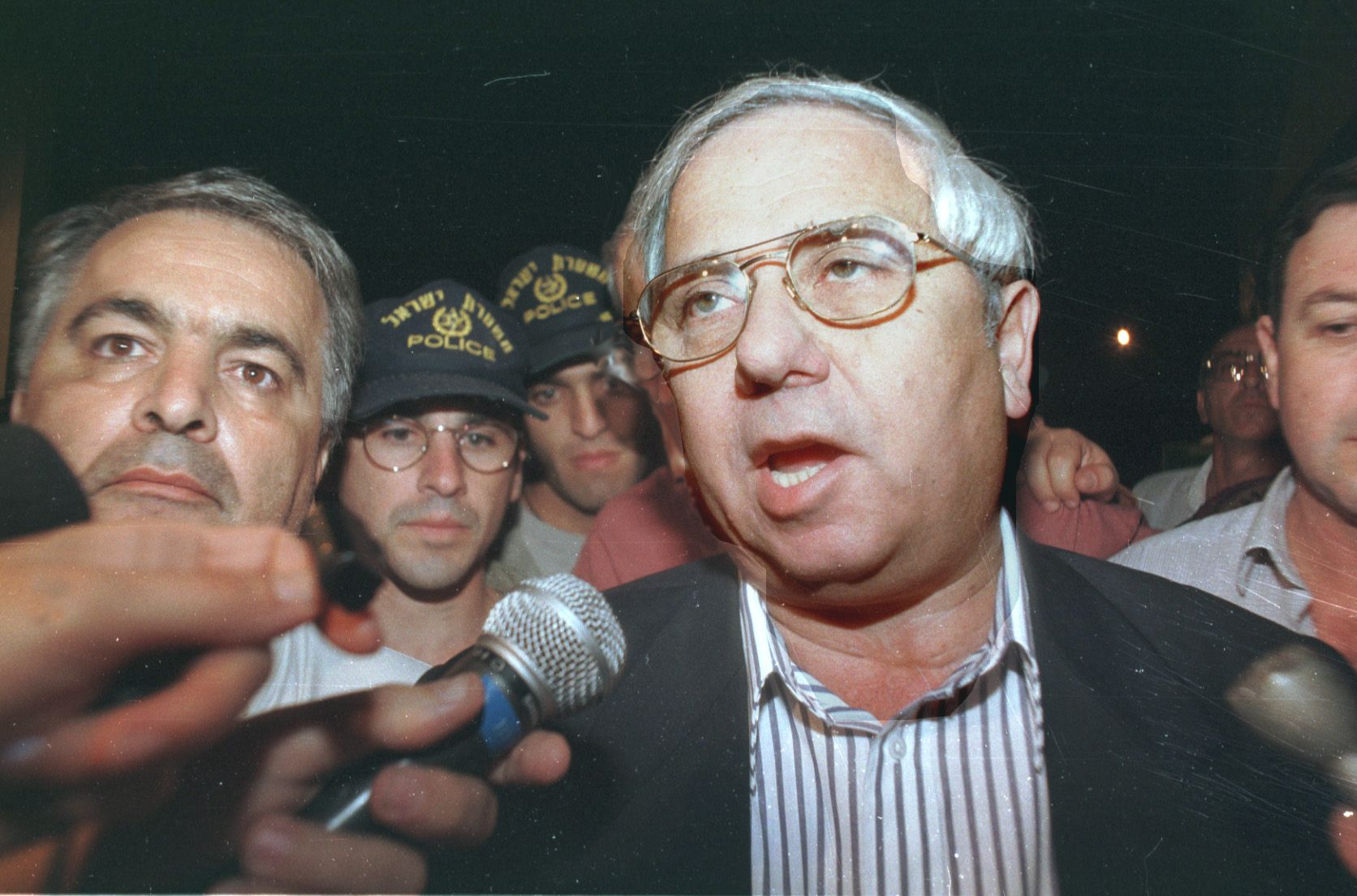
Eitan Haber informing the media that Rabin had died

At 11:15 pm, Eitan Haber walked out of the hospital to face the television cameras outside and announced Rabin's death to the media:

The government of Israel announces in consternation, in great sadness, and in deep sorrow, the death of prime minister and minister of defense Yitzhak Rabin, who was murdered by an assassin, tonight in Tel Aviv. The government shall convene in one hour for a mourning session in Tel Aviv. Blessed be his memory.

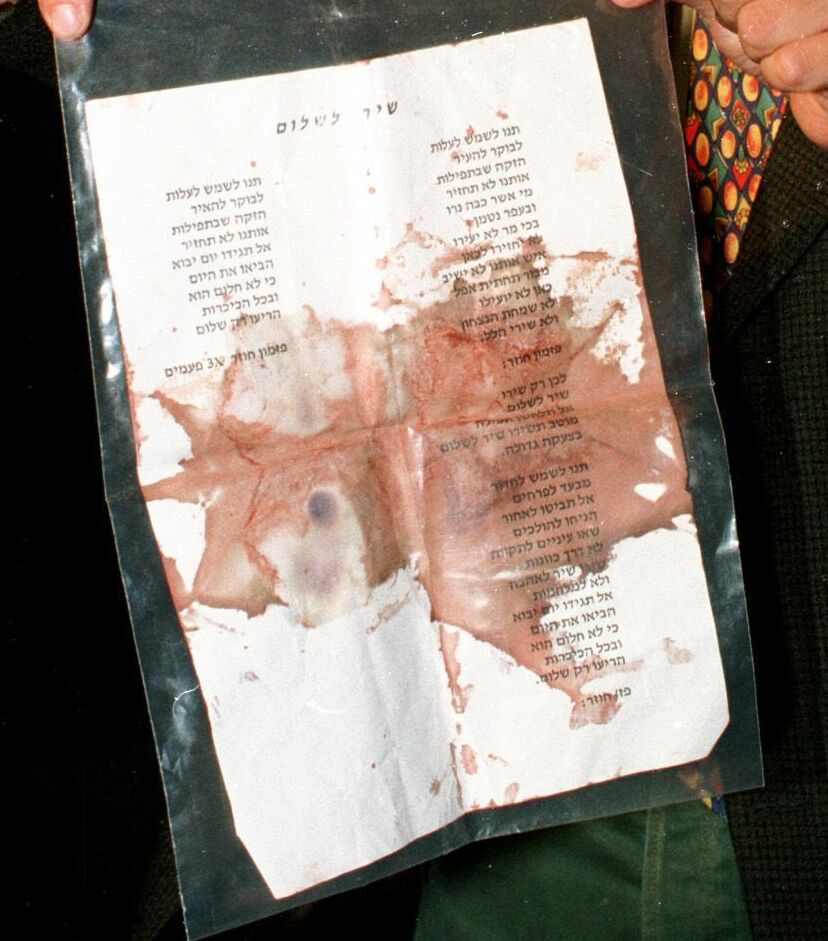
Blood-stained copy of the lyrics of "Shir LaShalom" ("Song for Peace"), found in Rabin's pocket after the assassination

In Rabin's pocket was a blood-stained sheet of paper with the lyrics to the well-known Israeli song "Shir LaShalom" ("Song for Peace"), which was sung at the rally and dwells on the impossibility of bringing a dead person back to life and, therefore, the need for peace.

Shortly after Rabin's death, an emergency meeting of the Israeli cabinet was held during which Shimon Peres, then serving as Foreign Minister, was appointed acting Prime Minister.

About three hours after Rabin's death, Yehuda Hiss, the Israeli government's chief pathologist, arrived at Ichilov Hospital to conduct an autopsy together with two assistants, including a photographer. The autopsy found that one bullet had entered Rabin's lower back, ruptured his spleen, and punctured his left lung, while the other pierced his back below the collarbone, smashed through his ribcage, and pierced his right lung. Hiss concluded that Rabin had died of massive blood loss and the collapse of both of his lungs, and that his chances of surviving the shooting had been extremely low. A subsequent brain scan found an embolism in one of Rabin's cerebral arteries, a large pocket of air which had entered his bloodstream in the lungs and traveled to the brain, restricting the flow of blood and oxygen. This blockage had hindered the resuscitation effort.

Amir was interrogated by Chief Superintendent Motti Naftali. He made a full confession and after being told that Rabin had died, Amir expressed joy and asked to be brought schnapps to make a celebratory toast. Police officers and Shin Bet agents subsequently raided the Amir family home in Herzliya, where they arrested Amir's brother Hagai, whom he had implicated as an accomplice during his interrogation.

== Aftermath ==
=== Rabin's funeral ===
US president Bill Clinton at Rabin's funeral. The final words were in Hebrew – "Shalom, Haver" (Hebrew: שלום חבר, lit. Goodbye, Friend).

The funeral of Rabin took place on November 6, two days after the assassination, at the Mount Herzl cemetery in Jerusalem, where Rabin was later buried. Hundreds of world leaders, including about 80 heads of state, attended the funeral. President of the United States Bill Clinton, King Hussein of Jordan, Queen Beatrix of the Netherlands, Russian Prime Minister Viktor Chernomyrdin, Spanish Prime Minister and European Council President-in-Office Felipe González, Prime Minister of Canada Jean Chrétien, acting Israeli Prime Minister and Foreign Minister Shimon Peres, United Nations Secretary-General Boutros Boutros-Ghali, Egyptian President Hosni Mubarak, President of the Republic of the Congo Denis Sassou Nguesso, and President of Israel Ezer Weizman were among those present.

A national memorial day for Rabin is set on the date of his death according to the Hebrew calendar.

=== Trial ===
Yigal Amir was tried for Rabin's murder, while his brother Hagai Amir and Dror Adani, who were his accomplices in the murder, were tried for conspiracy to murder Rabin. Yigal Amir was convicted and sentenced to life imprisonment for Rabin's murder and an additional six years for injuring Yoram Rubin. While in Israel it is customary for the President to reduce a life sentence to a set period, usually 20–30 years, with a possibility for further reduction for good behavior, Amir's sentence was not reduced. In 2001, the Knesset later passed the Yigal Amir Law, which prohibits a parole board from recommending a pardon or reduction in a sentence for the assassin of a prime minister. Adani was sentenced to seven years imprisonment, while Hagai Amir was sentenced to 12 years in prison, increased to 16 years upon appeal, and later received an additional year in prison for threatening to kill Prime Minister Ariel Sharon. Adani was released in 2002 and Hagai Amir in 2012. Yigal Amir remains incarcerated.

After the murder, it was revealed that Avishai Raviv, a well known right-wing extremist at the time, was a Shin Bet agent-informer codenamed 'Champagne'. Raviv was later acquitted in court of charges that he failed to prevent the assassination; the court ruled there was no evidence that Raviv knew assassin Yigal Amir was plotting to kill Rabin.

=== Domestic political aftermath ===
After the Rabin's death, Shimon Peres was made acting prime minister and acting defense minister of a provisional government. On 14 November 1995, the Labor Party confirmed Peres as its new leader, which thereby cleared the last formality before he could be invited by President Ezer Weizman to form a new government. On 15 November 1995, Peres was invited to form a new government; and on 21 November, Peres signed a coalition agreement between Labor, Meretz and Yiud (political parties which had been members of Rabin's government), which was formally approved by the Knesset the next day, establishing a new government with Peres as prime minister. Peres attempted to maintain the momentum of the peace process as prime minister over the next seven months.

On 10 February 1996, Peres made the widely expected announcement that he would call early elections, moving the elections to late May, five months earlier than they otherwise were to be held. The election would be the first to use a new system in which the prime minister was directly elected in a vote coinciding with the Knesset election. Peres had hoped that early elections would deliver a mandate for his pursuit of a two-state solution. Peres had called the elections early because of promising polls. He was heavily leading in the polls for the prime minister vote at the time the election was called, with polls showing him to have between a twenty and twenty-five percent lead. Additionally, Labor was also leading in polls for the Knesset vote. His lead in the polls began to decrease after the Jaffa Road bus bombings on 25 February 1996. However, even in the last month before the election, he enjoyed a reduced leading margin of around five percent. Ultimately, Peres was narrowly defeated by Netanyahu in the 1996 Israeli prime ministerial election. Netanyahu, as prime minister until 1999, acted to delay and undermine the Oslo process.

=== Social impact ===
Rabin's assassination shocked the Israeli public. Rallies and memorials took place near Kings of Israel Square – later renamed Rabin Square in his honor – as well as near Rabin's home, the Knesset building, and the home of the assassin. Many other streets and public buildings within Israel and internationally were named for Rabin as well.

The assassination has been described as emblematic of a kulturkampf ("cultural struggle") between religious right-wing and secular left-wing forces within Israel. Ilan Peleg of the Middle East Institute has described Rabin's assassination as "reflecting a deep cultural divide within Israel's body politic [...] intimately connected with the peace process" which illustrates both increased polarization and political conflict in the country.

On 28 March 1996, the Shamgar Commission issued its final report into the assassination. It was critical of Shin Bet for putting the Prime Minister at risk and ignoring threats to his life from Jewish extremists.

Due to the ultimate failure of further progress on the Oslo Accords, there is a popular view that the assassination is the most successful political assassination in modern history, as the perpetrator's goal of forestalling the Oslo peace process had been achieved.

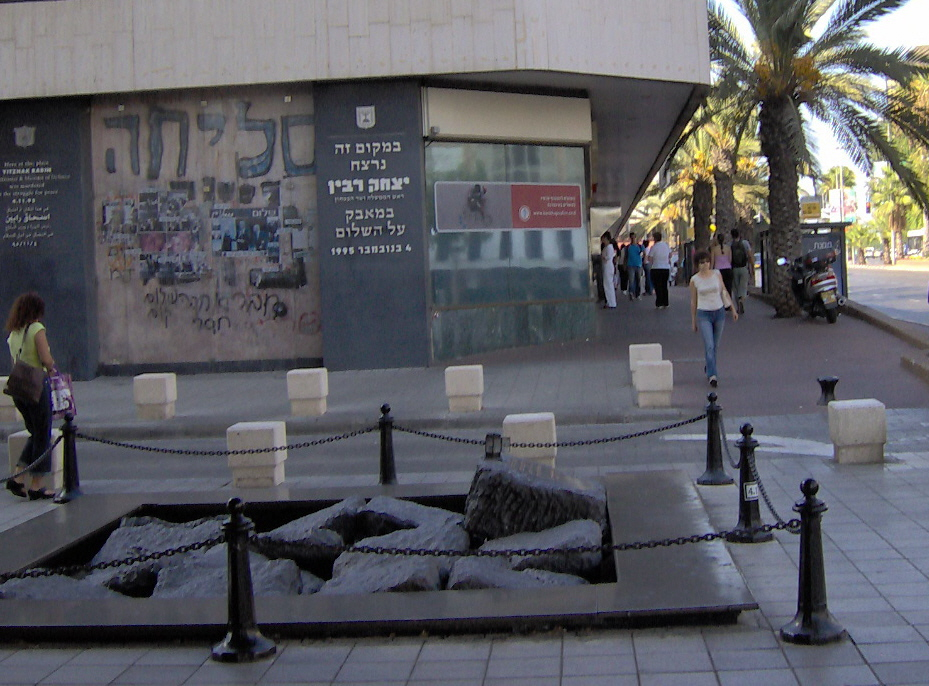
The monument at the site of the assassination

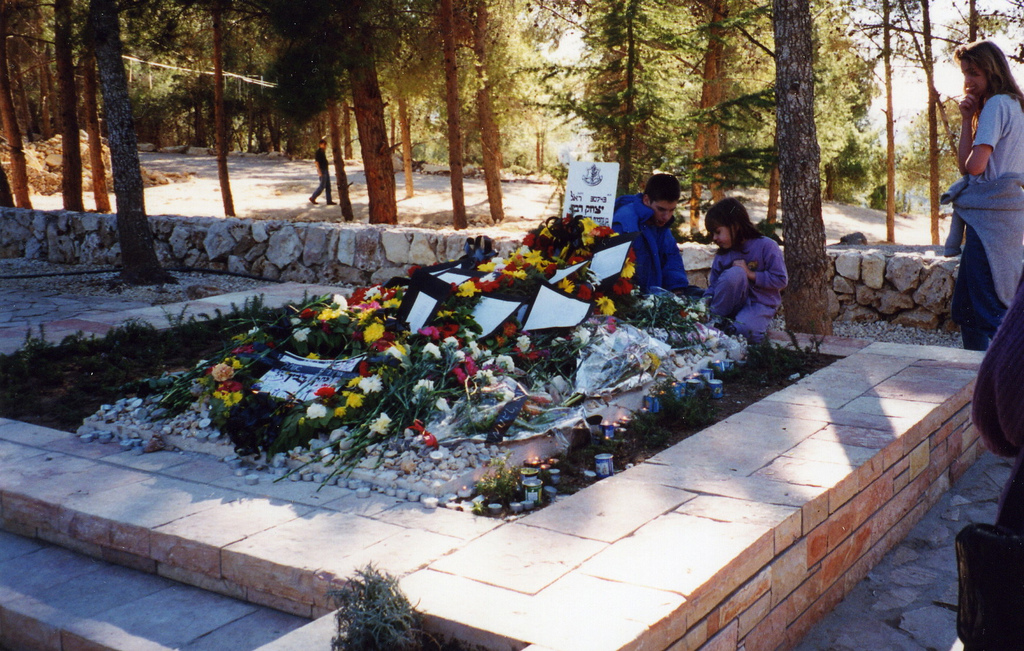
Rabin's grave, 1995

== See also ==
- Assassination of Shinzo Abe – Another assassination of a world leader described as having been successful in fulfilling the perpetrator's goals
- Kempler video – Film overlooking the assassination of Yitzhak Rabin
- List of heads of state and government who were assassinated or executed
- Yitzhak Rabin assassination conspiracy theories
