= Rodef =

Aggressor in Judaism

A rodef (Hebrew: רודף, lit. "pursuer"; pl. רודפים, rodfim), in traditional Jewish law, is one who is "pursuing" another to murder him or her. According to Jewish law, such a person must be stopped—even killed—by any bystander after that pursuer has been warned and refuses to stop. A source for this law appears in the Babylonian Talmud:

And these are the ones whom one must save even with their lives [i. e., killing the wrongdoer]: one who pursues his fellow to kill him [rodef achar chavero le-horgo], and after a male or a betrothed maiden [to rape them]; but one who pursues an animal, or desecrates the Sabbath, or commits idolatry are not saved with their lives.

This law, the din rodef ("law of the pursuer"), is significant as one of the few provisions in Jewish law permitting extrajudicial killings.

The allowance to kill the rodef does not apply, however, in a case where lesser means would prevent the innocent's murder. Furthermore, according to Maimonides, killing a rodef who may have been stopped by lesser means constitutes murder, though the punishment for a murderer in this case is not dealt out by beit din.

== Modern controversy ==
=== Yitzhak Rabin ===
In recent years, a number of rabbis have allegedly suggested that various public figures could qualify as rodfim, arguably encouraging one to kill. Perhaps most notoriously, former Israeli Prime Minister Yitzhak Rabin was branded a rodef by some for the Oslo Accord, an agreement for which he was assassinated in 1995. The assassin, Yigal Amir, subsequently justified his actions partly on the basis of din rodef, under the assumption that making concessions to the Palestinian Authority would endanger Jewish lives.

The Oslo Accords were controversial within Israel, and divided the population due to the extensive change in government policy regarding negotiations with then Israeli-designated terrorist organizations, such as the PLO.

According to Rabbi Arthur Waskow, Yigal Amir's interpretation of din rodef is a gross distortion of Jewish law and tradition.

First of all, the law of the pursuer only applies to a spontaneous act, whereas Yigal Amir planned this assassination for two years. Secondly, the law of the pursuer is only intended to save a potential victim from imminent death. There is absolutely no proof that withdrawing from certain territories will directly lead to the death of any Jews. On the contrary, Prime Minister Rabin, over half the members of the Knesset, and over half the population of Israel believe exactly the opposite – that it will save Jewish lives. Lastly, this law does not refer to elected representatives, for if Yitzhak Rabin was really a pursuer, then so are all his followers, and that would mean that Amir should have killed over half the population of Israel! In other words, even according to the law of the pursuer, this act was totally futile and senseless, since the peace process will continue.

=== Avigdor Nebenzahl ===
Other instances have occurred. In 2005, for instance, prominent Israeli Rabbi Avigdor Nebenzahl stated that "it should be known that anyone who wants to give away Israeli land is like a rodef", triggering an outcry and a special debate in the Knesset.

=== Geoffrey Alderman ===
In 2009, Jewish historian Geoffrey Alderman engaged in another controversy when he argued that, according to Jewish religious law, every Palestinian in Gaza who voted for Hamas was a legitimate target. He articulated his position in a debate with rabbi David J. Goldberg in The Guardian's commentary section. He argues that according to the Halakha, "it is entirely legitimate to kill a rodef – that is to say, one who endangers the life of another – and this is true, incidentally, even if the rodef has not yet actually taken another life".

Furthermore, he argues (without evidence) that

It seems clear to me from a common-sense reading of this passage [Babylonian Talmud, Tractate Sanhedrin, folio 73a] that the concept of a rodef encompasses those who advocate or incite the murder of Jews. Every Gazan citizen who voted for Hamas must – surely – come within this category, because Hamas as a movement is explicitly committed to the destruction, not simply of Israel, but of the Jewish people.

.
