= Avishai Raviv =

Israeli spy for Shin Bet (born 1967)

- אבישי רביב
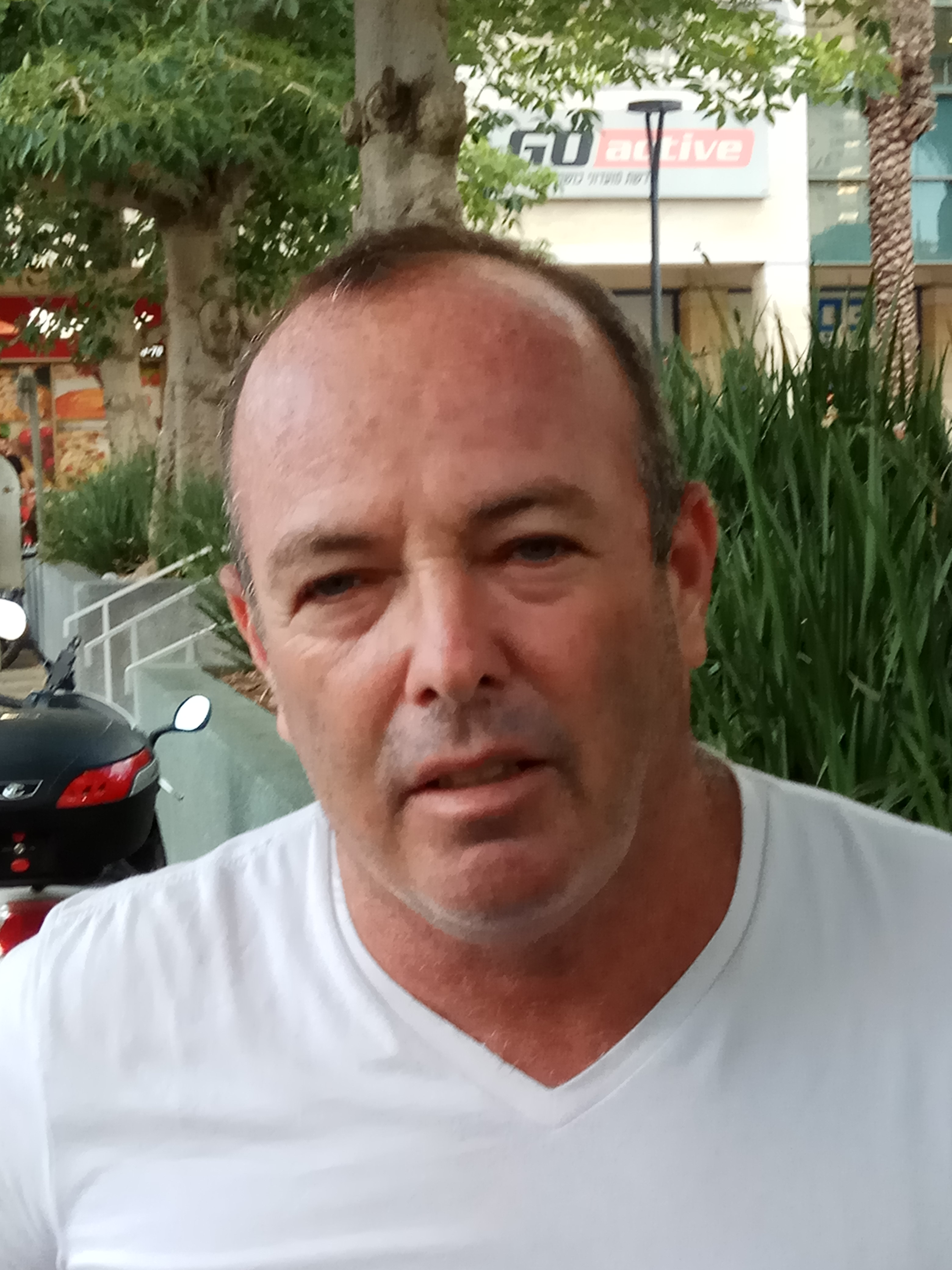
- Raviv in 2018
- Born: 8 June 1967 (age 58); Holon, Tel Aviv, Israel
- Occupation: Former agent

Avishai Raviv (Hebrew: אבישי רביב; born 8 June 1967) is a former agent of Israel's Shin Bet (Shabak), Israel's domestic intelligence service, whose mission was to monitor the activities of right-wing extremists. His code name was 'Champagne' (Hebrew: שמפניה, romanized: Shampaniyah).

== Biography ==
Avishai Raviv studied at Tel Aviv University, which expelled him for violent behavior, and later at Bar Ilan University.

Raviv was filmed at a public demonstration with a poster of Israeli prime minister Yitzhak Rabin in an SS uniform prior to Rabin's murder. Raviv allegedly knew of Yigal Amir's plans to assassinate Rabin.

After Rabin was assassinated, the journalist Amnon Abramowitch revealed that Raviv was an agent of the Shin Bet.

Raviv was brought to trial in 2000 for not preventing Rabin's assassination. Raviv mounted a successful defense on the grounds that he had just been doing his job and events had spun out of control.

During Raviv’s interactions with Yigal Amir as an informant, the Shin Bet grew suspicious that Raviv had not reported everything he knew about Amir to his handlers. Raviv was interrogated under suspicion and admitted that he had not disclosed information about Amir to his handlers.

After it was revealed that he had been a Shin Bet agent operating within the Israeli right-wing circles, there were calls—mainly from the political right—for him to be prosecuted. He was charged with failure to prevent a crime, based on the claim that he knew of Yigal Amir’s intentions but did not report them to his Shin Bet handlers, and also with supporting a terrorist organization (Eyal). In April 1999, an indictment was filed against Raviv in the Jerusalem Magistrate’s Court, though the second charge was later dropped. On March 31, 2003, Raviv was acquitted of all charges.

The judges ruled that Raviv did not know of Yigal Amir’s intention to assassinate Prime Minister Yitzhak Rabin. The verdict stated, among other things:

No actual motive was presented to us for why the defendant would knowingly and maliciously conceal from his handlers information he had received about Yigal Amir’s intent to murder the Prime Minister. On the contrary, the body of evidence presented suggests that the defendant had a strong motive to report Amir’s intentions to the Shin Bet—if he had known of them. This is because the Shin Bet was ‘his whole world’, and had he reported something that could have thwarted the assassination, he would have been regarded as a ‘hero’, and his self-image—as well as his image in the eyes of those who mattered to him, namely, the Shin Bet personnel—would have been elevated.

The second consideration relates to the defendant’s personality, as understood from various sources presented to us. The defendant was described, among other things, as childish in nature, with a low personal level, and unable to distinguish between what is important and what is trivial. A psychiatrist called as a defense witness described him as having a narcissistic personality disorder. Our conclusion, therefore, is that we are not dealing with someone of high personal strength, inner resilience, or self-confidence, but rather a person with a weak and somewhat dependent personality, a ‘people-pleaser’—which raises concerns about the possibility of a false confession.

The third consideration pertains to the defendant’s life circumstances in the eight years preceding the assassination. The verdict stated that it would not be an exaggeration to say that during his eight years as an informant, the defendant lived in a ‘world of lies.’ He was constantly pretending. He lied to those around him, to his parents, to his then-wife, to the media, and even to the Shin Bet.

The legal grounds for his acquittal also included difficulties in accepting the memorandum of the Shin Bet investigators who interrogated Raviv after the assassination as admissible evidence in his trial, as well as the testimony of the assassin himself, Yigal Amir.
