= Yigal Amir =

Israeli assassin (born 1970)

- יגאל עמיר
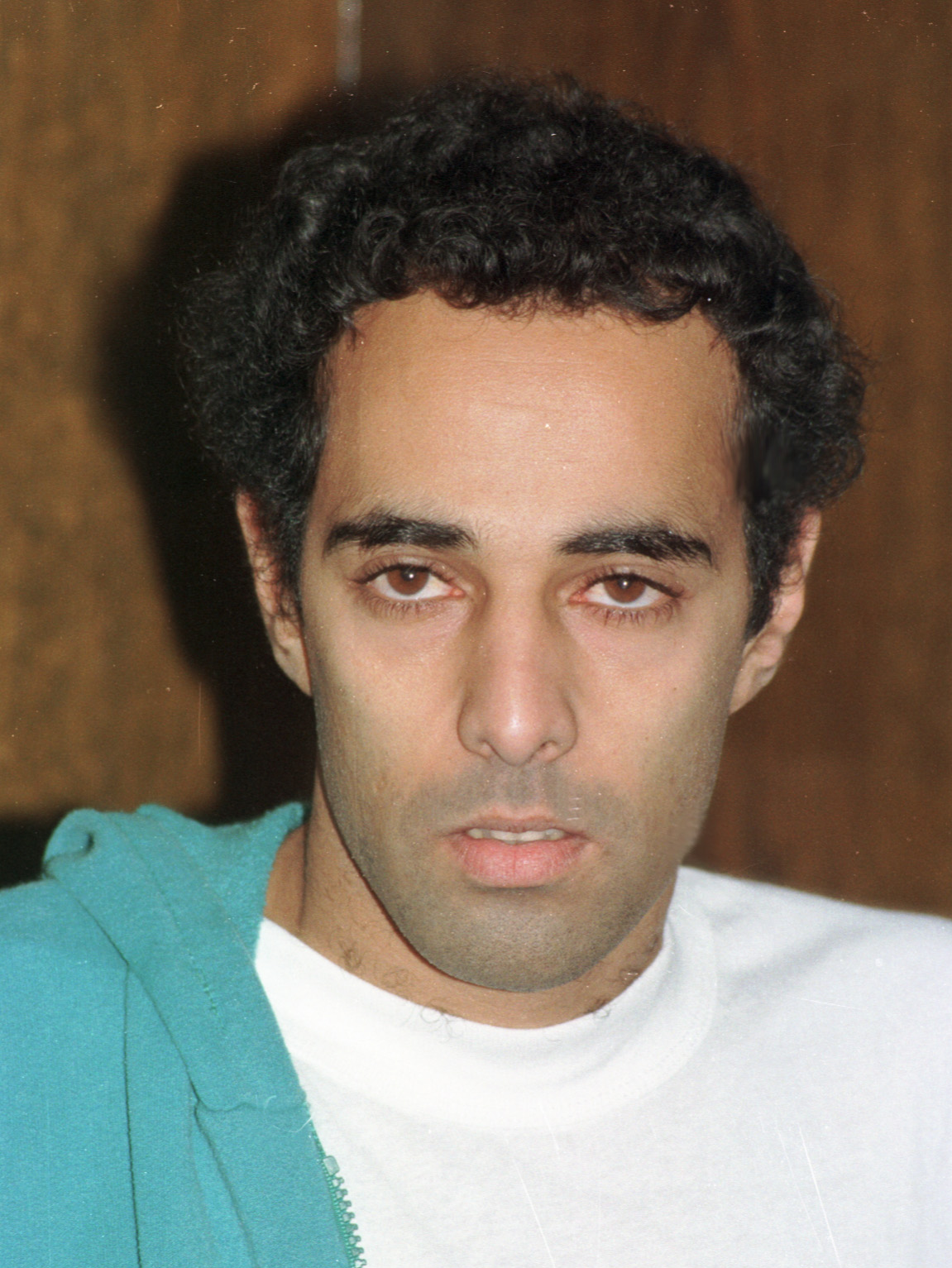
- Amir on November 30, 1995, 26 days after assassinating Yitzhak Rabin
- Born: May 31, 1970 (age 56); Herzliya, Israel
- Known for: Assassination of Yitzhak Rabin
- Spouse: Larisa Trembovler
- Children: Yinon Amir
- Status: Incarcerated
- Motive: Far-right extremism Rabin signing the Oslo Accords
- Convictions: Murder; Conspiracy to commit murder Aggravated injury
- Penalty: Life imprisonment plus 14 years

Details
- Date: November 4, 1995; 9:30 p.m.
- Locations: Rabin Square, Tel Aviv, Israel
- Killed: Yitzhak Rabin
- Injured: Yoram Rubin
- Weapon: Beretta 84F semi-automatic pistol

Yigal Amir (Note: Hebrew: יגאל עמיר) (born May 31, 1970) is an Israeli murderer who assassinated the incumbent prime minister of Israel, Yitzhak Rabin, on November 4, 1995, at the conclusion of a rally supporting the Oslo Accords in Tel Aviv. At the time of the murder, he was a law student at Bar-Ilan University. Amir is serving a life sentence for murder plus six years for injuring Rabin's bodyguard.

Numerous radical right-wing Israeli organisations have carried out campaigns for Amir's release. The Shin Bet security service has assessed that Amir remains a threat to national security. The Knesset passed a law preventing the president of Israel from pardoning the assassin of a prime minister.

== Early life ==
Amir was born in Herzliya to an Israeli Orthodox Yemenite Jewish family, the second of eight children. His father Shlomo was a sofer (scribe) who held a post supervising the kosher slaughtering of chickens and taught Shabbat lessons at a local synagogue. His mother Geula was a kindergarten teacher and ran a nursery school in the family home's backyard. Amir attended the Independent Education System-run Wolfsohn School in Herzliya, and Hayishuv Hahadash, a high school yeshiva in Tel Aviv. According to his mother, Amir, then aged 12, was initially rejected by the yeshiva for being a "dark Yemenite" before he convinced staff to admit him. After graduating in 1989, he served 20 months of military service in the Israel Defense Forces as a Hesder student, combining army service in a religious platoon of the Golani Brigade, with religious study at Yeshivat Kerem B'Yavneh between 1991 and 1993. Despite being in a religious unit, even his comrades considered him a religious fanatic.

In early 1993, Amir successfully applied for a handgun permit, listing the reason as self-defense while providing a false residence in Shavei Shomron, a Jewish settlement in the West Bank. In summer 1993, shortly after his graudation from Kerem B'Yayneh, Amir was nominated by the religious-Zionist youth movement Bnei Akiva to teach Judaism in Riga, Latvia, for two months as part of the Nativ organization.

After returning to Israel in October 1993, Amir began studying at Bar-Ilan University as part of its kollel program, mixing religious and secular studies. Amir studied law and computer science, as well as Jewish law at the Institute for Advanced Torah Studies. Amir was known for his argumentative nature during debates with his rabbis, including Bar-Ilan University Dean Moshe Raziel, as Amir held the view that Jewish laws took priority over the secular laws of Israel.

Amir was strongly opposed to the Oslo Accords between Israel and the Palestine Liberation Organization. He participated in protest rallies against the accords on campus, was active in organizing weekend bus outings to support Israeli settlers, and helped found an illegal settlement outpost. He was especially active in Hebron, where he led marches through the streets. After the accords, Amir reasoned in discussions with friends that the commandment "thou shalt not kill" did not apply to Rabin because he had "hand[ed] over Jewish holy lands to the Arabs, [thus] blocking the redemption of the Jewish people."

During his years as an activist, Amir became friendly with Avishai Raviv, to whom he allegedly revealed his plan to kill Rabin. After the murder, it was revealed that Raviv, a well known right-wing extremist at the time, was in fact only posing as a right-wing radical. In reality, he was working for Shin Bet, the Israeli internal security service. While some right-wing militants have accused the Shin Bet of having orchestrated the assassination to discredit them, a court later ruled that there was no evidence Raviv knew Amir was plotting to kill Rabin.

In 1994, during his university studies, Amir met—and began a platonic relationship with— a law student from an Orthodox Ashkenazi family. In January 1995, after five months, she ended the relationship after her parents objected due to Amir's Mizrahi background. She married one of his friends soon afterward. Amir, who attended the wedding, went into a deep depression.

== Assassination ==
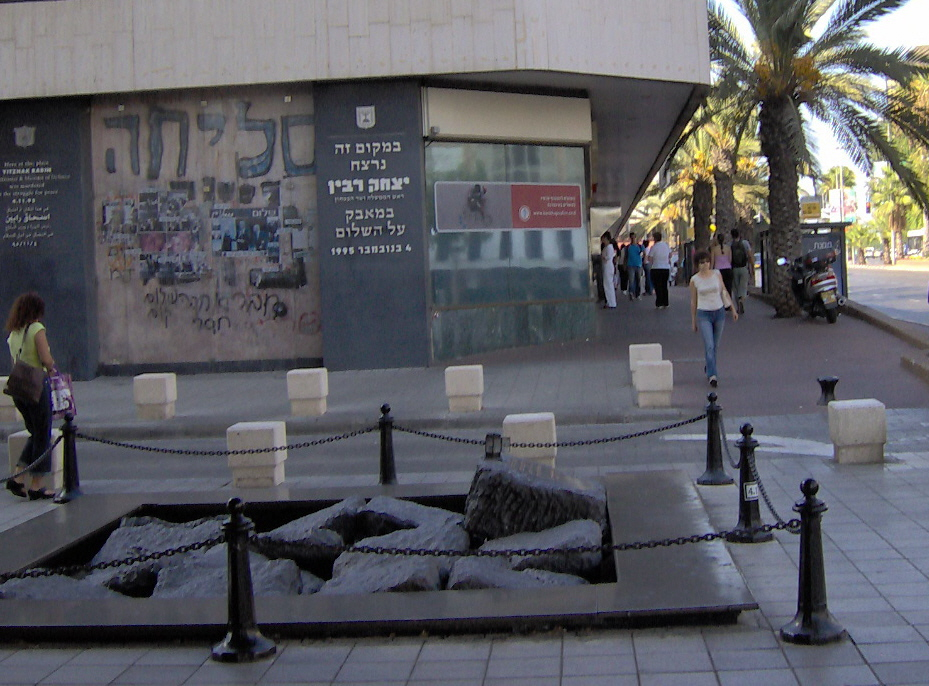
The monument at the site of the assassination: Ibn Gabirol Street, between Tel Aviv City Hall and Gan Ha'ir

On November 4, 1995, after a demonstration in Tel Aviv's Kings of Israel Square (now Rabin Square) in support of the Oslo Accords, Amir waited for Rabin in a parking lot adjacent to the square, close to Rabin's official limousine. There, he shot Rabin twice with a Beretta 84F .380 ACP-caliber semi-automatic pistol, and injured Yoram Rubin, a security guard, with a third shot. Amir was immediately seized by Rabin's bodyguards. Rabin was rushed to Ichilov Hospital where he died on an operating table 40 minutes later of blood loss and a punctured lung. According to the court, Yigal Amir's brother Hagai and his friend Dror Adani were his accomplices in the assassination plan.

Upon hearing that Rabin was dead, Amir told the police that he was "satisfied" and was acting on the "orders of God". At his trial, Amir said he did not care if the outcome was death or paralysis as long as Rabin was "out of the way". He expressed no regret for his actions.

=== Failed attempts ===
The assassination had been preceded by three unsuccessful attempts that same year: at Yad Vashem in Jerusalem, at the Nof Yerushalayim Hotel, and at a ceremony inaugurating a highway in Kfar Shmaryahu. These plans fell through moments before implementation.

== Trial ==
Amir's trial lasted from January 23 to March 27, 1996. He was initially defended by attorneys Yonatan Ray Goldberg and Mordechai Ofri, and later by Gabi Shachar and Shmuel Flishman. He was prosecuted by Pnina Guy, head of the Tel Aviv District Prosecutor's Office. The three judges who heard the case were presiding judge Edmond Levy and judges Saviona Rotlevy and Oded Mudrik. The judges ordered a mental examination by three district psychiatrists and a clinical psychiatrist, who all agreed that Amir understood the meaning of his actions and was fit to stand trial.

Amir admitted to shooting Rabin and attempted to justify his actions on religious grounds, claiming that shooting Rabin was an act of din rodef ("law of the pursuer"), which would allow killing to prevent the deaths of innocent Jews. He also claimed he had only intended to paralyze Rabin and not kill him. The court rejected his arguments, and he was found guilty of the murder of Rabin and inflicting injury under aggravating circumstances over the wounding of Yoram Rubin. Amir was sentenced to life imprisonment for the murder of Rabin plus six additional years in prison for injuring Rubin. In the verdict, the three judges wrote:

Every murder is an abominable act, but the act before us is more abominable sevenfold, because not only has the accused not expressed regret or sorrow, but he also seeks to show that he is at peace with himself over the act that he perpetrated. He who so calmly cuts short another's life, only proves the depth of wretchedness to which [his] values have fallen, and thus he does not merit any regard whatsoever, except pity, because he has lost his humanity.

Amir's claim that he was acting in accordance with Jewish law was rejected by the judges: "The attempt to grant religious authority to the murder ... is completely inappropriate and amounts to cynical exploitation of Jewish law for goals that are alien to Judaism."

Rabin's assassination was condemned by Bar-Ilan University. Daniel Sperber, a professor of Talmud at the university, said that the assassination "in no way represents the university or the policy of the university".

Amir was later sentenced to an additional five years, and after an appeal on behalf of the state, eight years, for conspiring to commit the assassination with his brother Hagai Amir and Dror Adani. All of the sentences were cumulative. In Israel, a sentence of life imprisonment is usually reduced to a period of 20–30 years by the president, with the possibility of further reduction for good behaviour. However, President Moshe Katsav did not reduce the sentence, saying that there is "no forgiveness, no absolution, and no pardon" for Yigal Amir. Prime ministers Benjamin Netanyahu and Ehud Olmert have also said that Yigal Amir will never be released from prison.

On December 19, 2001, the Knesset, by majority of 62 members, approved the Yigal Amir Law, which prohibits a parole board from recommending pardon or shortening time in prison for a murderer of a prime minister. His legal team and supporters deride the law as being tailor made to punish Amir, being applied retroactively. Amir began appealing on these grounds in December 2020 to the High Court of Justice against the law.

== Prison conditions ==
Amir was held in solitary confinement in Beersheba's Eshel Prison, and moved in 2003 to the Ayalon Prison in Ramla, where a solitary confinement wing was built especially for him. In 2006, he was transferred to Rimonim Prison in Tel Mond, near Netanya. He was also granted the privileges of having no surveillance cameras in his cell, the right to receive visitors in the visiting room, rather than in his cell, and the right to speak with other prisoners. Amir was interviewed by the Israeli press in 2008, but the planned broadcast was controversial and subsequently cancelled. As punishment for giving the interview, Amir was moved to Ramon Prison, and had a number of privileges withdrawn, including the removal of his TV and DVD player and the refusal of family visits; Amir went on a hunger strike in protest. In February 2010, the Nazareth District Court permitted the Ynet internet news service to interview Amir.

In July 2010, after 15 years of solitary confinement, Amir appealed to the Petah Tikva District Court to be permitted to participate in group prayers in accordance with Jewish law. He claimed that the terms of his imprisonment were worse than any other prisoner in the history of the State of Israel, on the grounds that no other prisoner had been in solitary for this amount of time. He said that failure to allow him to pray in synagogue would be a violation of his right to freedom of worship. In August 2010, the court ruled that Amir would be allowed to meet another prisoner for prayer three times a week, and that he would be allowed to study Torah with another prisoner once every two weeks.

In July 2012, it was announced that Amir would no longer be held in solitary confinement. Under his new prison conditions, he would be allowed to watch television and use a phone more frequently. Though he was not moved to an open cell block, where prisoners are allowed to spend most of the day outside their cells, he was given the right to meet other prisoners during his two hours' exercise in the prison yard.

In 2019, Amir's telephone was confiscated by prison authorities for two months after he used it for political purposes in violation of prison regulations. He had called rapper and right-wing political activist Yoav Eliasi and urged him to fight for his release, a request which Eliasi rejected. In protest, Amir launched a hunger strike and was subsequently penalized with seven days in solitary confinement in a cell with downgraded amenities.

== Campaigns for Amir's release ==
Amir's appeals of both sentences were rejected. Subsequently, a law was passed by the Knesset barring the pardon by the President of Israel for any assassin of a prime minister. Amir has never expressed regret for his actions. In 2007, the "Committee for Democracy" was formed by Itamar Ben-Gvir and Baruch Marzel to free Amir.

From time to time, radical Israeli right-wing organisations carry out campaigns (via posters or videos) that call for Amir to be released. Such a campaign was held in October 2007 in which the prominent Israeli singer Ariel Zilber also participated. In response to this campaign, the Israeli Internal Security Minister Avi Dichter stated: "This man is in the closest status a person can be to a death sentence", and also added that, "A reduction of his sentence is impossible and illogical, and it will surely accompany him until he would pass away".

His brother Hagai was released from prison on May 4, 2012, after serving 16 years of his sentence. Hagai, who claims to have no regrets and be "proud of what I did", was protested by left-wing individuals, allegedly including many members of the Knesset, such as Shelly Yachimovich, quoted as saying Hagai's public pride in the act was "a monstrous and disgusting act”. Since his release, Hagai has campaigned for the release of his brother. Hagai Amir was re-arrested and sentenced to house arrest in 2015 for a Facebook post wishing death on President Reuven Rivlin.

== Personal life ==
=== Marriage ===
Amir is married to Larisa Trembovler, who was born in Russia. She has a PhD in philosophy. She has published a novel in Russian (A Mirror for a Prince), and is an Orthodox Jew. She met Amir in Latvia, where he was teaching Judaism. After her immigration to Israel, she visited Amir with her then-husband, Benjamin (with whom she has four children), for humanitarian reasons. She expressed ideological support for Amir, and they began to correspond and speak on the phone. She divorced Benjamin in 2003.

Trembovler announced that she was engaged to Amir and wanted to marry him, while he was in jail. In January 2004, after their request was filed, the Israel Prisons Service declared it would not permit the marriage. In April 2004, the matter was brought before the Tel Aviv District Court. At the time, the Prisons Commissioner instructed his legal aides to defend the decision based on security considerations. Amir's lawyers, however, said this claim violated their client's basic rights and would not hold up in court. They noted that several Palestinians serving multiple life terms for crimes such as murder have been permitted to marry in prison. Legal analysts have said the Supreme Court would likely uphold any appeal by Amir's lawyer, unless specific legislation is enacted prohibiting him from marrying. In August 2004, Trembovler and Amir were wed in a surreptitious proxy marriage. Under Jewish law, a prospective husband can grant a form of "power of attorney" to a chosen representative, who can then transfer a wedding ring, or something of similar value, to the prospective wife. In July 2005, their marriage was validated by an Israeli rabbinical court. Trembovler submitted a petition after the Interior Ministry refused to register her and Amir as a married couple. Israel's Justice Ministry defined Amir's marriage as "problematic" because according to a past ruling, a marriage ceremony not conducted in the presence of a rabbi from the Chief Rabbinate is unrecognised.

==== Conjugal visits and artificial insemination ====
On February 6, 2006, Haaretz reported that Attorney General Menachem Mazuz had ordered the Interior Ministry to register Amir and Trembovler as a married couple. They then filed requests with the Prison Authority and petitions to court to enable them to hold conjugal visits or conceive a child through artificial insemination.

In March 2006, the Israeli Prison Service approved Amir's petition for in vitro fertilisation (IVF). The service was to study how this process would be conducted without Amir leaving the prison. A week later, Amir was caught handing a pre-prepared bag of semen to his wife, and the visit was terminated. After the incident, a disciplinary tribunal barred visits from his wife for 30 days, and phone calls for 14 days. He was fined NIS 100 (then US$21). When the IVF treatments were withheld due to a petition by several members of Knesset, Amir went on a hunger strike. After being warned that hunger strikes are in violation of prison regulations, some of his privileges were canceled.

Up until October 20, 2006, the Shin Bet security service had opposed unsupervised visits. Four days later, Amir was allowed a 10-hour-long conjugal visit. Five months later, it was reported that Trembovler was pregnant. On October 28, 2007, she gave birth to a son, who was named Yinon Eliya Shalom. The brit milah was held in prison on November 4, 2007, the 12th anniversary of Rabin's assassination.

In 2020, Amir requested a furlough from prison to attend his son's bar mitzvah, which the Israel Prison Service denied. Amir appealed the decision to the Beersheba District Court, which upheld the refusal.

== In popular culture ==
On July 8, 2015, a documentary on Yigal Amir, Beyond the Fear, premiered in Jerusalem. The film explored the thorny drama of the Moscow-born intellectual Larisa Trembovler, who married assassin Yigal Amir after he was sentenced to life in prison and, following a court battle for a conjugal visit, gave birth to their son in 2007. The late filmmaker Herz Frank, who died in 2013, spent about 10 years following Trembovler, receiving unprecedented access to her and their son, Yinon. Rabin's granddaughter called the film a "cynical use of the freedom of expression with intent to harm it".

The 2019 film Incitement consists of a portrayal of the factors that led Amir to commit the assassination. Debuting at Sundance, the movie went on to win the 2019 Ophir Award.
