= Hagai Amir =

Israeli assassin conspirator

Hagai Amir (Hebrew: חגי עמיר; born 1968) is the brother and accomplice of Yigal Amir, the assassin of Yitzhak Rabin.

== Biography ==
Hagai Amir was convicted for conspiracy to murder Yitzhak Rabin and planning attacks against Palestinians, as well as for various weapons charges. Among other related activities, he has admitted to personally manufacturing the hollowpoint bullets that were used by his brother, Yigal, to commit the murder.

On 27 April 2006, he was additionally convicted for threatening to have then-Israeli Prime Minister Ariel Sharon killed. Following a trial before the Netanya Magistrates' Court, he was sentenced to a year in prison, of which half a year was to be added to his current prison term.

Hagai served his sentence at Ayalon Prison in Ramla. On 4 May 2012, he was released from prison. Since his release from prison, Hagai has been living with his parents, while studying engineering and running his own welding company. He has adopted anti-Zionist views after his time in prison, stating that the "state of the Jews has no justification to exist."
