= Jewish terrorism =

Acts of terrorism committed in the name of Judaism

Jewish terrorism is terrorism, including religious terrorism, committed by Jewish fundamentalists. The phrase has been used by some, including Israeli government officials, to describe Israeli settler violence.

== Zealotry in the 1st century ==
According to Mark Burgess (a Center for Defense Information research analyst), the 1st century Jewish political and religious movement called Zealotry was one of the first examples of the use of terrorism by Jews. They sought to incite the people of Judaea to rebel against the Roman Empire and expel it from Israel by force of arms. The term Zealot, in Hebrew kanai, means one who is zealous on behalf of God. The most extremist groups of Zealots were called Sicarii. Sicarii used violent stealth tactics against Romans. Under their cloaks they concealed sicae, small daggers, from which they received their name. At popular assemblies, particularly during the pilgrimage to the Temple Mount, they stabbed their enemies (Romans or Roman sympathizers, Herodians), lamenting ostentatiously after the deed to blend into the crowd to escape detection. In one account, given in the Talmud, Sicarii destroyed the city's food supply so that the people would be forced to fight against the Roman siege instead of negotiating peace. Sicarii also raided Jewish habitations and killed fellow Jews whom they considered apostates and collaborators.

== Mandatory Palestine ==
From 1939 to 1947, two Jewish terrorist organisations, Irgun and Lehi, engaged in terrorist activities with a view to undermining Britain's control over Palestine.

== Post-1948 ==
Jewish terrorism in Israel existed for a few years during the 1950s and was directed at internal Israeli-Jewish targets, not at the Israeli Arab population. There was then a long intermission until the 1980s, when the Jewish Underground was exposed. The phenomenon of price tag attacks began around 2008. These are hate crimes committed by extremist settler Jewish Israelis that usually involve the destruction of property or hateful graffiti, particularly targeting property associated with Arabs, Christians, secular Israelis, and Israeli soldiers. The name was derived from the words "Price tag" which may be scrawled on the site of the attack — with the allegation that the attack was a "price" for settlements the government forced them to give up and revenge for Palestinian attacks on settlers.

Researchers Ami Pedahzur and Arie Perliger suggested that similarities exist between Jewish religious terrorists and jihad networks in Western democracies, among them: alienation and isolation from the values of the majority, mainstream culture, which they view as an existential threat to their own community; and that their ideology is not exclusively "religious", as it attempts to achieve political, territorial, and nationalistic goals as well (e.g. the disruption of the Camp David accords). However, the newer of these Jewish groups have tended to emphasize religious motives for their actions at the expense of secular ones. In the case of Jewish terrorism in modern Israel, most networks consist of religious Zionists and ultra-Orthodox Jews living in isolated, homogeneous communities. However, unlike jihad networks, Jewish terrorists have not engaged in mass-casualty attacks, with the exception of Baruch Goldstein.

Shin Bet has complained that the Israeli government is too lenient in dealing with religious extremism of Jewish extremists who want the creation of a Jewish land based on halacha, Jewish religious laws. Says Haaretz: "The Shin Bet complained that the courts are too lenient, particularly in enforcement against those who violate restraining orders distancing them from the West Bank or restricting their movement. The Shin Bet supports the position of Defense Minister Moshe Ya'alon, who has called for limited use of administrative detention against Jewish terrorists." Israeli agencies keeping tabs on the religious terrorist groups say they are "anarchist" and "anti-Zionist", motivated to bring down the government of Israel and create a new Israeli "kingdom" that would operate according to halacha (Jewish law). A week after the July 2015 attacks, administrative detention was approved for Jewish terror suspects. In 2024, Haaretz reported that the settlements and outposts from which many settler attacks come are financed by the Israeli government.

Haaretz's investigation reveals that at least six government ministries are involved in financing and maintaining this whole burgeoning enterprise, whose underlying purpose is the forceful takeover of land and systematic dispossession of Palestinian residents.

In July 2026, a letter signed by 600 former security officials from the Israel Police, Mossad, and Shin Bet warned US President Trump against Jewish terrorism, the support provided to them by the current government of Israel, and the weakening of the Palestinian Authority, citing negative consequences for US national interests and regional stability. The letter added that "While [Israel's] security agencies excel at confronting [...] Palestinian terrorist organizations in the West Bank, they are severely constrained when it comes to Jewish terrorists". The letter came amid a hike in settler violence in the West bank.

== Terrorist groups ==
The following groups have been considered religious terrorist organizations in Israel (in chronological order by establishment year):

=== 1950s ===
- Brit HaKanaim (בְּרִית הַקַנַאִים "Covenant of the Zealots") was a radical religious Jewish underground organization which operated in Israel between 1950 and 1953, against the widespread trend of secularisation in the country. The ultimate goal of the movement was to impose Jewish religious law in the State of Israel and establish a Halakhic state.
- The Kingdom of Israel group (מלכות ישראל Malkhut Yisrael) or Tzrifin Underground, were active in Israel in the 1950s. The group carried out attacks on the diplomatic facilities of the USSR and Czechoslovakia, and occasionally shot at Jordanian troops stationed along the border in Jerusalem. Members of the group were caught trying to bomb the Israeli Ministry of Education in May 1953, have been described as acting because of the secularisation of Jewish North African immigrants which they saw as 'a direct assault on the religious Jews' way of life and as an existential threat to the ultra-Orthodox community in Israel.'

=== 1980s ===
- Jewish Underground (1979–1984): formed by members of the Israeli political movement Gush Emunim. This group is most well known for two actions: firstly, for bomb attacks on the mayors of West Bank cities on 2 June 1980, and secondly, an abandoned plot to blow up the Temple Mount mosques. The Israeli Judge Zvi Cohen, heading the sentencing panel at the group's trial, stated that they had three motives, "not necessarily shared by all the defendants. The first motive, at the heart of the Temple Mount conspiracy, is religious."
- Keshet (Kvutza Shelo Titpasher) (1981–1989): A Tel Aviv anti-Zionist Haredi group focused on bombing property without loss of life. Yigal Marcus, Tel Aviv District Police commander, said that he considered the group a gang of criminals, not a terrorist group.
- Kach, a banned far-right party in Israel (officially registered 1971–1994), and its splinter group Kahane Chai (1991-1994), also banned. Today, both groups are considered terrorist organisations by Israel, Canada, the European Union and the United States. The groups are believed to have an overlapping core membership of fewer than 100 people. The Jewish Defense League in America, founded by Kahane, is also considered terrorist. FBI statistics show that, from 1980 to 1985, 15 terrorist attacks were attempted in the U.S. by JDL members. The FBI's Mary Doran described the JDL in 2004 Congressional testimony as "a proscribed terrorist group". The National Consortium for the Study of Terrorism and Responses to Terrorism states that, during the JDL's first two decades of activity, it was an "active terrorist organization."
- Terror Against Terror (Terror Neged Terror, "TNT"), active 1975–1984, was a radical Jewish militant organization that sponsored several attacks against Palestinian targets. The group was founded by Meir Kahane's Kach organization, and took its name from Kahane's theory that Arab terrorism should be met with Jewish terrorism.
- Sicarii, an Israeli terrorist group founded in 1989 who made arson and graffiti attacks on leftist Jewish politicians. They were opposed to any process of rapprochement with the Palestine Liberation Organization.
- The "Bat Ayin Underground" or Bat Ayin group. In 2002, four people from Bat Ayin and Hebron were arrested outside of Abu Tor School, a Palestinian girls' school in East Jerusalem, with a trailer filled with explosives. Three of the men were convicted for the attempted bombing.

=== 2000s ===
- Lehava (est. 2005), was referred to as an extreme religious minority trying through terror to implement their views of how the society should look. In January 2015, Channel 2 reported that Defense Minister Moshe Ya'alon may be preparing to categorize Lehava as a terrorist organization. Ya'alon was reported to have ordered the Shin Bet and the Defense Ministry to assemble evidence required for the classification. Former Justice Minister Tzipi Livni stated that Ya'alon's move to name anti-assimilation group Lehava a terrorist organization should have been made months before. "This organization works from hatred, racism, and nationalism, and its goal is to bring an escalation of violence within us", she said. Tamar Hermann, a sociologist and pollster with the Israel Democracy Institute (IDI), reports that government action against Lehava has only come following months of petitioning by "left-leaning Israelis and media commentators." Israeli rabbi Binyamin Lau, warned that: "Lehava wants to implement a reign of religious terror."
- Sikrikim (first appeared in 2005), a radical group of ultra-Orthodox Jews based mainly in the Israeli ultra-Orthodox neighborhoods Meah Shearim in Jerusalem and in Ramat Beit Shemesh. The anti-Zionist group is thought to have roughly 100 activist members. The Sikrikim gained international attention for acts of violence they committed against Orthodox Jewish institutions and individuals who would not comply with their demands. They are loosely affiliated with Neturei Karta.
- "The Revolt" terror group: Members of the Jewish "Revolt" terror group claim the secular state of Israel has no right to exist; they hope to create a Jewish kingdom in Israel and state that Arabs will be killed if they refuse to leave. Shin Bet says the "Revolt" group's ideology began to evolve in October 2013, shaped by veteran "hilltop youth", including Rabbi Meir Kahane's grandson, Meir Ettinger, who was temporarily put under administrative detention. Before the Duma attack, the group's members had committed 11 arson attacks against Palestinians or Christian churches. 23 of their members were detained because of the Duma attacks.

== Individuals ==
Several violent acts by Jews have been described as terrorism and attributed to religious motivations. The following are the most notable:

- Ami Popper, on 20 May 1990 went to a bus stop after stealing his brothers weapon and IDF uniform. There he made Arab workers line up and requested their ID cards to verify that they not were Jews. He also stopped and forced passengers of a car with West Bank license plates to join the line at gunpoint. Then he opened fired, killing seven and wounding 10.
- Baruch Goldstein, an American-born Israeli physician, perpetrated the 1994 what became known as the Cave of the Patriarchs massacre in the city of Hebron, in which he shot and killed 29 Muslim worshipers inside the Ibrahimi Mosque (within the Cave of the Patriarchs), and wounded another 125 people. Goldstein was killed by the survivors. Goldstein was a supporter of Kach, an Israeli political party founded by Rabbi Meir Kahane that advocated the expulsion of Arabs from Israel and the Palestinian Territories. In the aftermath of the Goldstein attack and Kach statements praising it, Kach was outlawed in Israel.
- Yigal Amir's assassination of Yitzhak Rabin on 4 November 1995, has been described as terrorism with a religious motivation. Amir was quoted as saying he had "acted alone and on orders from God", and that, "If not for a Halakhic ruling of din rodef, made against Rabin by a few rabbis I knew about, it would have been very difficult for me to kill." A former combat soldier who had studied Jewish law, Amir stated that his decision to kill the prime minister was influenced by the opinions of militant rabbis that such an assassination would be justified by the Halakhic ruling of din rodef ("pursuer's decree"). This Jewish religious concept allows for an immediate execution of a person if that person is "pursuing", that is, attempting immediately to take your life or the life of another person, although the characterization of Rabin as din rodef was rejected as a perversion of law by most rabbinic authorities. According to Amir, allowing the Palestinian Authority to expand on the West Bank represented such a danger.Amir was associated with the radical Eyal movement, which had been greatly influenced by Kahanism.
- Yishai Shlisel, a Haredi Jew, has stabbed three marchers in a gay pride parade in Jerusalem on 30 June 2005. Shlisel claimed he had acted "in the name of God". He was charged with attempted murder.
- Eden Natan-Zada killed four Israeli Arab civilians on 4 August 2005. His actions were condemned by then-prime minister Ariel Sharon, as "a reprehensible act by a bloodthirsty Jewish terrorist", and author Ami Pedahzur describes his motivations as religious.
- On 17 August 2005, Asher Weisgan killed four Palestinian workers and injured another in the 2005 Shilo shooting when he was driving four workers out of the settlement and stopped at the entrance where he snatched a weapon from a guard and shot the passengers killing three. He then ran back to the factory, where he killed another one. On his way there he shot at but missed the wounded survivor from the bus who were pursuing him, yelling "Asher, what are you doing? Weisgan was known in the settlement as a "liberal" who did not hate Arabs and had known the victims well for years. His motive was to stop the 2005 disengagement from the Gaza strip and northern Samaria by hoping other would follow his example and to provoke an Arab reprisal which would force Israeli security forces to stop the ongoing expulsion of its Jewish residents. He voiced no remorse for the killings and wished for the murder of Ariel Sharon.
- Yaakov Teitel, an American-born Israeli, was arrested in the aftermath of the 2009 Tel Aviv gay center shooting for putting up posters that praised the attack. Although Teitel confessed to the gay center shooting, Israeli police have determined that he had no part in the attack. In 2009, Teitel was arrested and indicted for several acts of domestic terror, namely a pipe bomb attack against leftist intellectual Zeev Sternhell, the murders of a Palestinian taxi driver and a West Bank shepherd in 1997, and sending a booby-trapped package to the home of a Messianic Jewish family in Ariel. A search of his home revealed a cache of guns and parts used in explosive devices. As of January 2011, the case was still pending trial. On 16 January 2013 Teitel was convicted of two murders, two attempted murders, and several other charges.
- The kidnapping and murder of Mohammed Abu Khdeir occurred early on the morning of 2 July 2014, a day after the burial of three murdered Israeli teens. Khdeir, a 16-year-old Palestinian, was forced into a car by Israeli settlers on an East Jerusalem street. Yosef Ben-David and two minors were arrested for the act. Preliminary results from the autopsy suggested that he was beaten and burnt while still alive. He was beaten repeatedly with a crowbar, each blow accompanied by a recital of Jewish victims of terrorism. Khdeir was recognized by Israel as a victim of terrorism, a move which entitled the family to compensation. The murders contributed to a breakout of hostilities in the 2014 Israel–Gaza conflict.
- Yishai Shlisel again stabbed and injured six marchers at the Jerusalem gay pride parade on 30 July 2015. It was three weeks after he was released from jail. One of the victims, 16-year-old Shira Banki, died of her wounds at the Hadassah Medical Center three days later, on 2 August 2015. Shortly after, Prime Minister Netanyahu offered his condolences, adding "We will deal with the murderer to the fullest extent of the law."
- Duma arson attack: On 31 July 2015, two Palestinian homes were firebombed by masked attackers, leading to the immediate death of a baby and the injury of other family members, in what Israeli Prime Minister Benjamin Netanyahu termed a "terrorist" act. Perpetrators left graffiti in Hebrew on the gutted home saying "Revenge!" and "Long live the messiah!", or "Yechi Hamelech Hamashiach", the motto of the messianist wing of the Chabad-Lubavitch movement, which believes that Menachem Mendel Schneerson, a rabbi who died in 1994, "is the messiah and will return to rebuild the ancient kingdom and redeem the world". The motive, as stated in the indictment, was revenge for the murder of the young Israeli Malachi Rosenfeld by Palestinians, near Duma, about a month earlier. On 8 August, the father of Ali Dawabsha, Saad Dawabsha, died of the burns he sustained in the attack. Amiram Ben-Uliel was convicted of murder and arson as part of a "terrorist act", and a minor who confessed and made a plea deal was convicted of membership in a terrorist organization and involvement in planning the murders; both were sentenced to time in prison.

== See also ==
- Zionist political violence
- List of Irgun attacks
- Israeli settler violence
- Jewish military history
- Kahanism
- Israel and state-sponsored terrorism
- Judaism and violence
