= Church of the Primacy of Saint Peter =

Christian holy site in Israel

Coordinates: 32.873929°N 35.549403°E

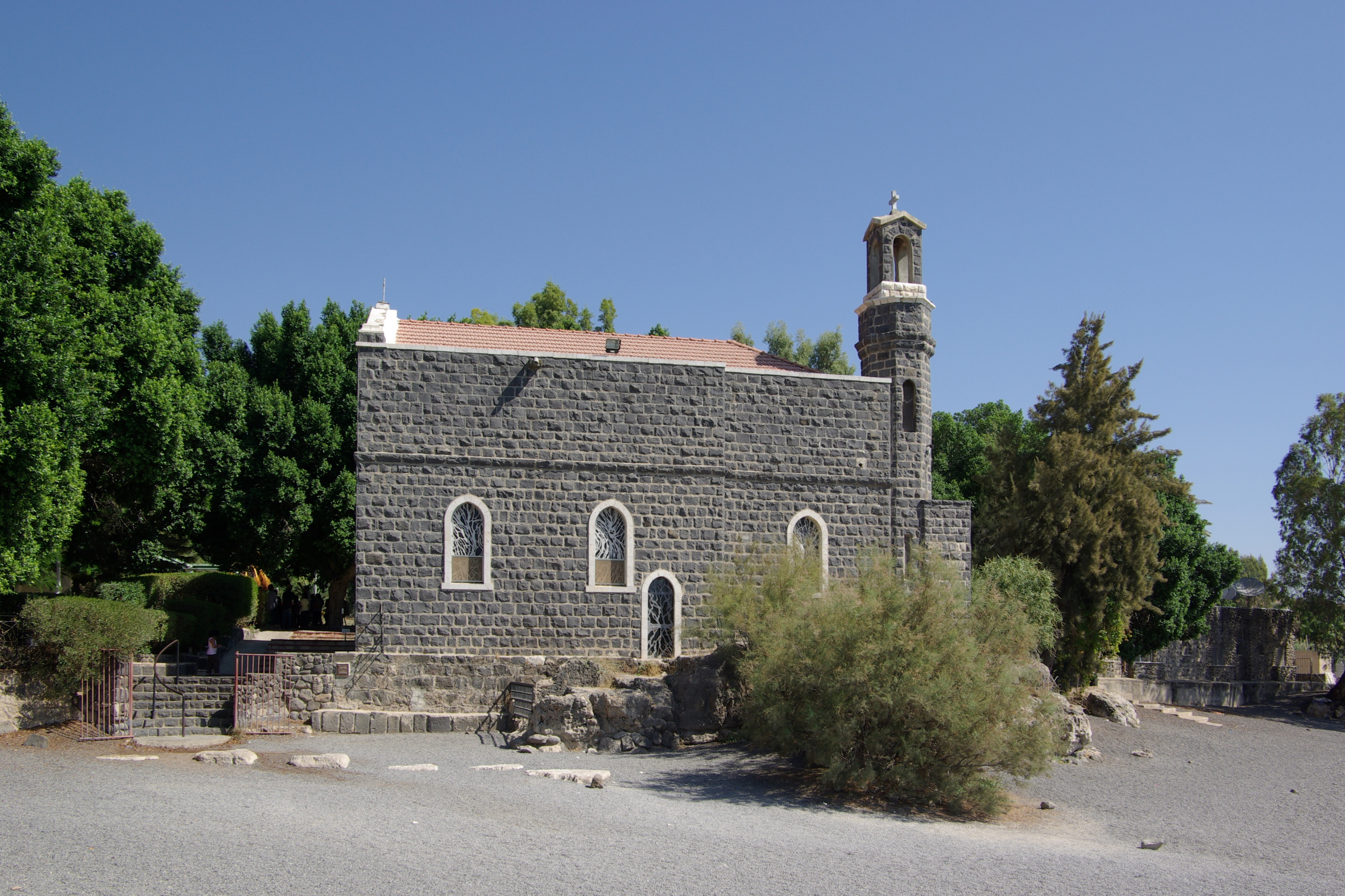
- Exterior View

Religion
- Affiliation: Roman Catholic
- Leadership: Franciscan Order

Location
- Location: Tabgha, Israel
- Interactive map of Church of the Primacy of Saint Peter

Architecture
- Completed: 1933

The Church of the Primacy of Saint Peter is a Franciscan church located in Tabgha, Israel, on the northwest shore of the Sea of Galilee. It commemorates, and allegedly marks the spot, of Jesus' reinstatement of Peter as chief among the Apostles.

== History ==
The modern structure was built in 1933 and incorporates parts of an earlier 4th century church. At the base of its walls, opposite the main altar, foundations of the 4th century church are visible. In the 9th century, the church was referred to as the Place of the Coals. This name refers to the incident of Jesus' preparation of meal for the apostles, building a charcoal fire on which to cook the fish. Also first mentioned in the year 808 are the "Twelve Thrones", a series of heart shaped stones, which were placed along the shore to commemorate the Twelve Apostles. The church survived longer than any other in the area, finally being destroyed in 1263. The present Franciscan chapel was built on the site in 1933. This church was included in the itineraries of Popes Paul VI and John Paul II during their visits to Israel in 1964 and March 2000 respectively.

== Mensa Christi ==
The church contains a projection of limestone rock in front of the present altar which is venerated as a "Mensa Christi", Latin for table of Christ. According to tradition this is the spot where Jesus is said to have laid out a breakfast of bread and fish for the Apostles, and told Peter to "Feed my sheep" after the miraculous catch, the third time he appeared to them after his resurrection. (John 21:1–24) It is disputed whether this table, or the one enshrined at the nearby Church of the Multiplication, is the one mentioned by the pilgrim Egeria in her narrative of the Holy Land circa 380. There is also another table of Christ enshrined at the Mensa Christi Church in Nazareth.

== Gallery ==
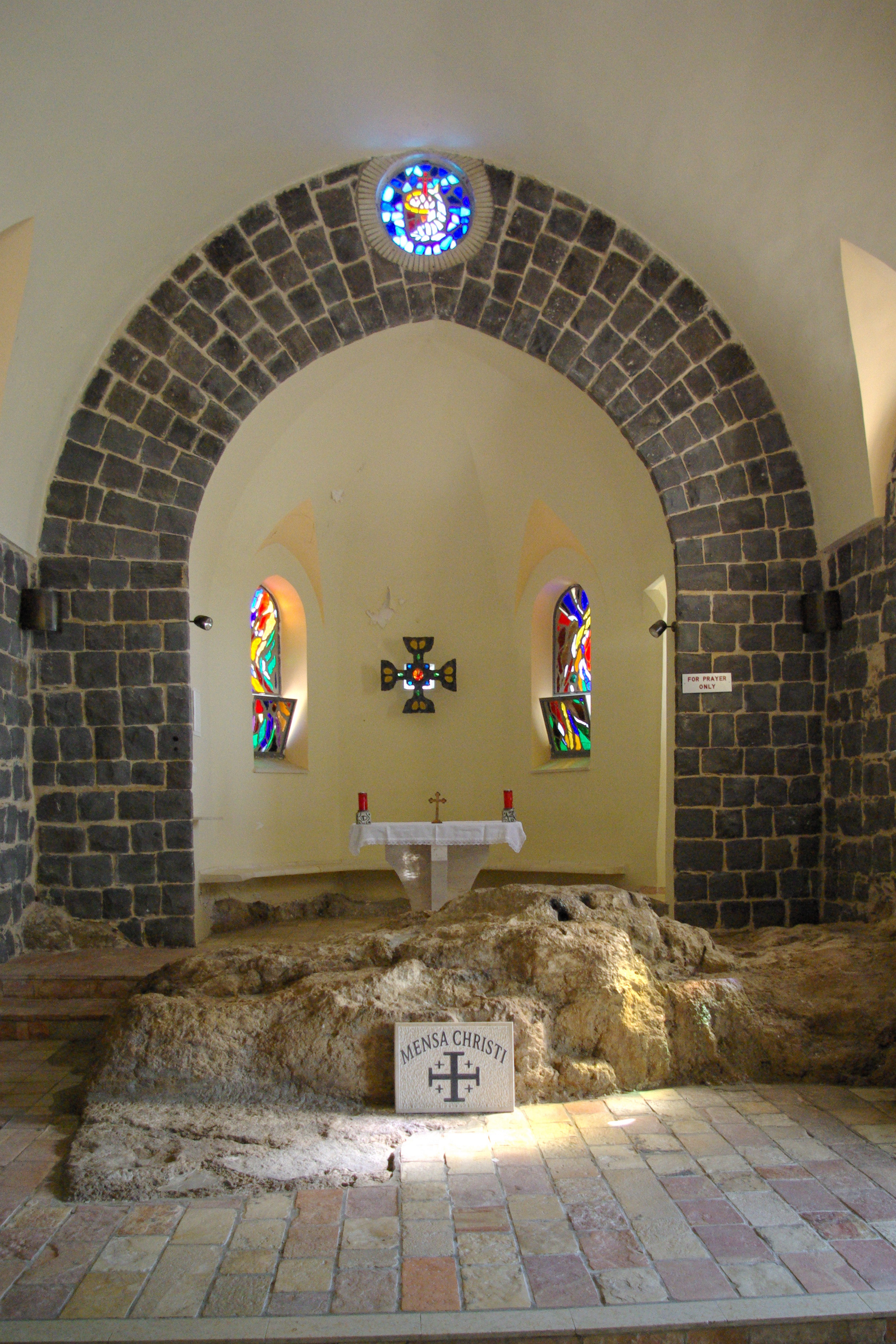
Interior

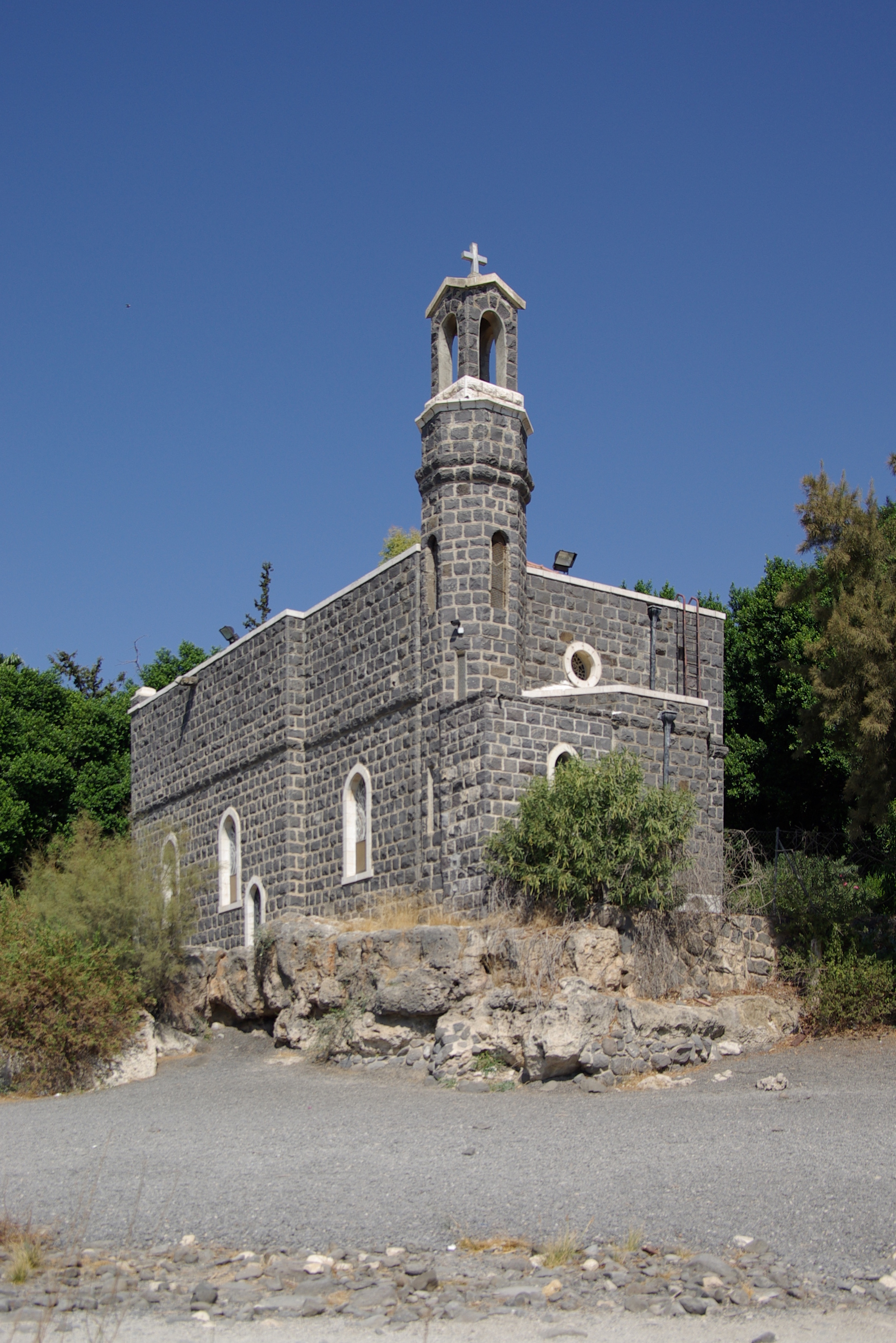
Exterior
