= Amishav Melet =

Israeli settler

- עמישב מלט
- Born: 1990 or 1991 (age 34–35)
- Occupations: farmer, settler, activist
- Known for: founding Israeli outposts in the West Bank
- Movement: Israeli settler
- Children: 6-7

Amishav Melet is an Israeli settler, activist, and farmer. He lives in the West Bank, which he considers Israeli territory. With Meir Ettinger, he co-founded the Israeli outpost of Geulat Zion in 2012. He later established the HaNekuda BaEmek outpost. Outposts are illegal under both Israeli and international law.

== Biography ==
Melet was born in 1990 or 1991 and has 7 siblings. His grandfather and great-grandfather moved to Mandatory Palestine from Lithuania. His father founded an outpost, an Israeli community built in the West Bank that is illegal under both Israeli and international law. Some Israeli outposts have become recognized as settlements by the Israeli government, making them legal under Israeli law but still illegal under international law.

In his youth, Melet befriended Meir Ettinger, an influential member of the extremist Hilltop Youth settler group. Like Ettinger, Melet did not enlist in the Israel Defense Forces (IDF). They lived in several Israeli outposts across the West Bank, including Shvut Ami, Ramat Migron, and Maoz Esther. In May 2012, Melet was married in Ramat Migron, where he lived. Because it was taking place in a closed military zone, Israeli security forces disrupted the wedding, seizing chairs, tables, and other items. According to the settler Daniella Weiss, the military allowed the wedding to proceed after it was moved to another location nearby.

=== Geulat Zion ===
After Melet's wedding, he and Ettinger founded the Geulat Zion outpost (Hebrew: גאולת ציון, "The Redemption of Zion") near the Shilo settlement. They lived there with Melet's wife, Sarah-Miriam. Beginning in 2011, Ettinger was periodically detained or banned from the West Bank by security forces. Government records show that Melet was found guilty of assaulting police in 2014. In August 2015, he was one of 11 settlers ordered to leave the West Bank by the Israeli government. By that time, his house had been demolished by security forces on 5 occasions. According to Melet, the official reason for his deportation was false allegations that he had attacked Palestinians and security forces, but he believed the government's true motivation was his mentorship of Hilltop Youth. Melet and his family temporarily moved in with his parents in the West Bank settlement of Hermesh, where he was subject to a night curfew. He was banned from the rest of the West Bank for at least a year, later telling Ynet that he faced two legal charges but was not convicted.

As of 2017, Melet and his family had returned to living in Geulat Zion. By 2021, it was one of the most widely known settler outposts in the West Bank and was inhabited by youths and one other family. Melet and his family lived without electricity or running water in a small wooden house that he made. They farmed and herded livestock, including sheep. Periodically, the outpost would be dismantled by Israeli security forces and then rebuilt by the settlers. Melet also assisted in reconstructing other outposts after they were destroyed. In February 2023, Israeli security forces removed over 1,000 trees illegally planted by settlers in Shilo. Melet protested alongside dozens of yeshiva students and Knesset member Limor Son Har-Melech. He climbed 5 meters (16.4 feet) up one of the trees, where he spoke to the media and called on right-wing politicians Bezalel Smotrich and Itamar Ben-Gvir to take action.

Melet organized activism against a real estate development project that would build 94 homes in the Palestinian village of Turmus'ayya, saying it was an "Arab takeover". One 2020 video shows Melet, Ettinger, and two other settlers preventing traffic from reaching the construction site. In 2023, Melet, Sarah-Miriam, Ettinger, and three other settlers were sued by the development company. According to the 18 million shekel ($5.2 million) lawsuit, 74 attacks on the project were carried out by settlers between 2019 and 2022, and Israeli security forces did not adequately respond to the violence. The settlers' lawyer from Honenu disputed the allegations and said they had taken part in valid protests; he stated that the construction project is an attempt to hinder Israeli settlements as well as a serious danger to the settlers.

=== HaNekuda BaEmek ===
In 2024 or 2025, Melet established a new outpost, known as HaNekuda BaEmek (Hebrew: הנקודה בעמק, "Point in the Valley") or Emek Shiloh. The handful of portable buildings is located near the Israeli settlement of Shilo and the Palestinian town of Turmus'ayya on land owned by Palestinian families. Local Palestinians have attributed a rise in settler attacks to the new outpost. Melet has denied taking part in any violence and said that his family has been shot at by Palestinians.

Melet's brother Benayahu was killed in July 2026 during an altercation with residents in the Palestinian village of Tell.

In September 2026, US ambassador to Israel Mike Huckabee visited a home in Tumus'ayya in response to complaints from Palestinian-American residents about settler attacks. He recorded a video of Melet driving near the house on an ATV and said he would share the video with US President Donald Trump. He later referred to settler violence as "an act of terror". Several days later, Huckabee's predecessor David Friedman posted a photo of himself with Melet on social media, calling Melet "a vegan, a pacifist and a farmer".

== Personal life and views ==
Melet was married in 2012. He and his wife, Sarah-Miriam, have 6 or 7 children. Sky News describes him as an energetic, "imposing figure" with a thick beard.

Melet believes that Israel owns the land in the West Bank according to the Bible. He sees himself as continuing the work of Abraham, David Ben-Gurion, and his father, who established an outpost in the West Bank. According to Melet, he and his fellow settlers choose strategic locations for outposts which will help them appropriate the maximum amount of desirable land. He stated that they try to "blur" the distinction between the three areas in the West Bank (Note: The Oslo Accords divided the West Bank into 3 "areas" with varying levels of Palestinian governance. Most Israeli settlements are located in Area C which is largely controlled by Israel, while Area B has Palestinian control over civil affairs. Melet's outpost, HaNekuda BaEmek, is in Area B.) to "push forward as much as possible" and that they "establish outposts [and] stretch the boundaries of settlement." Melet identifies as a peace activist and has stated several times that he is not involved in any violence against Palestinians.
