= The Revolt (group) =

Israeli far-right organization

- Leader: Meir Ettinger (alleged)
- Country: Israel
- Ideology: Conservatism; Halachic state Monarchism; Kahanism
- Size: 30-40 people

The Revolt (Hebrew: המרד) is an Israeli Jewish Kahanist group responsible for the Duma arson attack. The group advocates for dismantling the State of Israel in order to establish a Kingdom of Israel that follows Jewish Law. The group's membership numbers in the range of 30-40 people. Between the founding of the ideological origin of the group in 2013, and the Duma arson attack, the group was responsible for 11 other arson attacks. Another significant arson attack perpetrated by the group targeted the Church of the Multiplication of the Loaves and Fishes in Tabgha, Northern district. The arson left important material damages in the church. In December 2017, Eyal Reuveni was sentenced to 4 years in prison for the attack.

The origin of the name comes from the manifesto of the group, which details their ideology for overthrowing the State. According to Aviad Mendelboim writing for Ynet "The most extreme group that emerged as part of the new Jewish terror is Kvutzat Ha'mered organization (the rebel group)—the members of which held the banner in support of the defendants during the Duma trial." which consists of dozens of members that identify with Meir Ettinger, the author of the manifesto "The Revolt". Many of the group's members are affiliated with the Hilltop Youth.

As of 2017, the group was still active, in what the Shin Bet internal security agency is calling "the second generation of the infrastructure of the revolt."
