= Meir Ettinger =

Israeli Kahanist and activist (born 1991)

- מאיר אטינגר
- Born: 4 October 1991 (age 35); Kiryat Moshe, Jerusalem, Israel
- Other name: Meir Mordechai Ettinger
- Known for: Hilltop Youth leadership; Duma arson attack
- Movement: Hilltop Youth
- Spouse: Moriah
- Parents: Mordechai Ettinger (father); Tova Ettinger (mother)
- Family: Meir Kahane (maternal grandfather)
- Website: www.hakolhayehudi.co.il

Meir David Chai Ettinger (Hebrew: מאיר דוד חי אטינגר; born 4 October 1991), also called by mistake Meir Mordechai Ettinger is an Israeli Kahanist activist and extremist known for leading the Hilltop Youth, a group that pursues the expansion of Israeli settlements in the West Bank, conducts punitive price tag attacks on Palestinian villages, and targets Palestinians, Christians and in certain instances, Israeli forces. Ettinger has called for the demolition of what he and his associates deem ”secular” state of Israel and State of Palestine, and its replacement by a religious society based on Biblical principles.

== Life ==
Meir Ettinger is one of 12 children of Mordechai and Tova (née Kahane) Ettinger. His father serves as a rabbi at the Har Hamor and Ateret Cohanim (Note: The Ateret Cohanim yeshiva is directly involved in purchasing Palestinian properties in the occupied territories to convert them to Jewish settlements) yeshivot. His mother Tova is the daughter of Rabbi Meir Kahane, regarded as the father of far-right Jewish militancy and the founder of Kach, a radical Orthodox political party and movement later banned by the Israeli government under its anti-terrorism laws.

Meir was raised in the Jerusalem suburb of Kiryat Moshe. While frequenting high school, he began to wander around the hills of the West Bank, a move that disconcerted his parents. His wife Moriah was raised in the settlement of Shiloh.

== Ideology ==
Meir Ettinger is said to have become a disciple of Rabbi Yitzchak Ginsburgh, after meeting settlers from the Israeli settlement of Yitzhar. Around 2011, he studied under Ginsburgh at the Od Yosef Chai yeshiva. Ginsburgh is on record as being opposed to price tag assaults on Palestinians and their property. Meir Ettinger is said to have disagreed with Ginsburgh's pacifistic approach in this regard, as Ettinger advocated the adoption of violence in order to undermine the foundations of Israel.

=== Comparisons with Meir Kahane ===
Meir Kahane, according to Ehud Sprinzak, espoused a view of the world, based on his reading of Kiddush Hashem, called catastrophic messianism, requiring the exaltation of Jews and the humiliation of their enemies. According to this vision of the "sanctification of God's name",

the Messiah will come in a great conflict in which Jews triumph and praise God through their successes.

Ettinger has been called the "ghost of Meir Kahane". Many similarities between Meir and his maternal grandfather, once dubbed "Israel's Ayatollah", have been noted: the cheerful outlook, articulateness, the absolute self-assurance of being right, the shared belief that most Palestinians must be expelled in order to make way for a Jewish state and accomplish Biblical prophecy. His words echo closely those of his grandfather. In Brooklyn, as in Israel and the West Bank, posters and graffiti proclaim that "Kahane was right", a slogan characteristic of the Hilltop Youth movement.

As with his grandfather's example, Meir Ettinger's messianic Zionism dismisses the idea that Zionism was to establish a secular state, a state he detests. In a work written when he was 19, The Rebel Manifesto, he declared his refusal to have anything to do with Israeli political formations, (Note: Disaffiliation with all Israeli institutions is, Gershuni argues, characteristic of Hilltop youth.) since the state itself, and its multiculturalism, was an impediment to the recreation of Biblical Israel. (Note: As with ISIS, this authenticity is predicated on destroying all institutions of the secular State of Israel, which is undeserving of recognition.) To this end, the state, as constituted, had to be destroyed, and the coming of the Messiah was imminent. According to Mark Juergensmeyer, Ettinger's grandfather's extremist message influenced the execution of terroristic acts like the Cave of the Patriarchs massacre carried out by the Kach militant Baruch Goldstein and the assassination of Yitzhak Rabin by Yigal Amir. Juergensmeyer argues that the visions for a future Jewish religious state of both Meir Kahane and his grandson Meir Ettinger parallel the kind of an idealized Islamic society subscribed to by Mahmud Abouhalima, the perpetrator of the World Trade Center bombing.

== Activism ==
Meir became a charismatic leader among the militant settler movement known as Hilltop Youth. Shlomo Fischer, a sociologist at Hebrew University, states that Ettinger represents violent activists who trust themselves to be endowed with prophetic authority, and compared the group to the militant 1980s Jewish Underground, Ettinger's rise to dominance, also as leader of a movement called The Revolt, was earmarked by acts, observed at the time by Israeli security officials, such as attacking a Palestinian shepherd's flock, stoning a sheep, and then slaughtering it in front of the terrified herder. He has played a leading role in setting up illegal Israeli outposts on Palestinian land, and attracted police attention for his militancy in two outposts - one, Ramat Migron, just outside the settlement of Migron, and another, Givat Ronen, near Har Brakha. With his close friend Amishav Melet, he established the Geulat Zion outpost. He was part of a group that infiltrated Joseph's Tomb in 2011, against explicit IDF orders to keep away from the site. Migron was dismantled by force, and Ettinger served a spell in jail for his disruptive attempts to hinder the military's evacuation of such outposts.

According to the Shin Bet, the internal Israeli security service, Ettinger set up in September 2013 an organization dedicated to the overthrow of the state in four stages by striking it where it was most vulnerable. In 2012, Ettinger was arrested for complicity in what Israeli media termed the "spy affair". According to the indictment, 5 settler youths had organized an "operations room" for monitoring IDF movements in the West Bank in order to intercept communications and forewarn settlers in outposts of IDF plans to evacuate the sites. Ettinger was subsequently sentenced to a 6-month term for "conspiracy to collect information of military value". Israeli media regarded Ettinger as "the most-wanted figure by the Jewish division of the Shin Bet".

Ettinger was known to undertake price tag assaults on nearby Palestinian villages. On 7 January 2014, he and a band of between 8 and 10 other settlers were surrounded and detained at Qusra, which had already lost half of its land to Israeli settlements, had hundreds of olive trees destroyed, 18 sheep killed and 6 cars torched. Settlers at the Esh Kodesh outpost had planted olive trees on privately owned Palestinian land, and the Israeli civil administration had them removed. From 20 to 30 youths set out to attack Palestinian villages in protest at the army's action. On descending a hill, while "stoning" farmers and damaging olive trees at Qusra, they were cornered, and either "retreated" or were "pushed" into a partially built local house. Village elders ensured their safety for 2 hours until a Palestinian liaison officer contacted the IDF which sent a platoon to escort them out of the village. The group said they were on a harmless unarmed hike in the hills when assaulted by Palestinians. A prayer leader of the local mosque replied that they were masked and armed with pipes and clubs, showing a reporter a sledgehammer. (Note: Shalom and Levy report that the group was "beaten to a pulp" before being handed over to the Israeli authorities. Published photos show Ettinger smiling. He claimed he had been struck on the head with a boulder.) A week later, on 15 January, the door of a mosque nearby was set alight after being daubed with graffiti reading "Blood for blood, Qusra". Ettinger laid the blame for the incident on the army for refusing to allow them to carry weapons, commenting:

"Sometimes there are also losses in a war, but our miracle was not due to the army, but due to God... We acted with tremendous courage, but because of the conditions in the field, the numerical advantage of the Arabs around us and the negligence of the army, who won't let us possess arms, we realized that the battle was lost, we suffered injuries and were trapped inside the house."

The rabbis behind the Hilltop Youth argue that Jewish redemption must be positively assisted by acts to help bring it about. (Note: "If we see that there is a government that gets in the way of carrying out our mission..we must think about how to overthrow the regime that interferes with the rebuilding of the Temple, that stands in the way of the true and complete redemption.") The Hilltop Youth is a radical group believed to be responsible for an arson attack on the Christian Church of the Multiplication of the Loaves and Fishes on the 17 July 2015. Some in Israel regard them as a Jewish version of ISIS. (Note: "Some in Israel refer to them in disgust and horror as "Jewish ISIS", and while there's a great distance between Al Baghdadi's practice of beheading, burning alive, and massacring thousands of people and the violence of extreme members of Hilltop Youth, there is indeed a deep connection between the two phenomena.") Orthodox settlers speak of them as "hotheads", with some rabbis, among them the West Bank settlement leader rabbi Ezra Tubi, stating that, while troublemakers, these youths were correct in their belief that the West Bank formed an integral part of Biblical Israel, a territory Jews were entitled to claim possession because it was a right given to them by God.

In 2023, Ettinger, Amishav Melet, and four other settlers were sued by a Palestinian development company over a stalled plan to build 94 homes in the Palestinian village of Turmus'ayya. According to the 18 million shekel ($5.2 million) lawsuit, 74 attacks on the project were carried out by settlers between 2019 and 2022.

== Arrest ==
The Duma arson attack, near the Palestinian village of Nablus and the outpost of Adei Ad, was defined officially as an act of Jewish terrorism, and was the most severe of at least 120 settler assaults on Palestinians that took place leading up to the incident. Close by is an Israeli settlement Ma'ale Efrayim, where many of Duma's residents, including the father of the Dawabsheh family was employed. One day before the attack, Ettinger wrote on his blog a disavowal he was in any way connected to price tag assaults, while stating that many Jews are not bound by the laws of the state, but only God's law. (Note: "The truth must be told - there is no terror organization, but there are a whole lot of Jews, a lot more than people think, whose value-system is completely different than that of the High Court or the Shin Bet, and who are not bound by the laws of the state, but by much more eternal laws, true laws.") As to the Duma firebombing, he protested on his blog that the outcry of protests over the arson constituted a "terrorist attack on Judaism and Jewish values".

With a high profile as a religious ultra-nationalist, Meir, together with Eviatar Slonim (Note: Slonim is a relative of the far-right politician Moshe Feiglin.) and Mordechai Meyer, was arrested in a government crackdown as a suspect for the arson given his association with numerous prior attacks. The government withheld the reasons for his arrest. He was imprisoned under administrative detention laws, which are mainly applied to Palestinians, and rarely to Jews, for six months leading to widespread assumptions that he was the ringleader of several violent terrorist actions. Human rights groups in Israel like B'Tselem criticized the use of administrative detention. The confirmation of the decision was made by Judge Avraham Tal after reviewing 180 intelligence reports and an 82-page-long document of analysis provided by the Shin Bet. His lawyer complained that Ettinger had been subjected to tiltul methods, rough shaking and punching, during his interrogation. Moshe Yaalon also commented that the government was convinced the 3 youths in detention were linked to the Duma attack, stating that, '"We wouldn't conduct these administrative arrests if there wasn't any connection to the arson." His mother secluded herself after her son was arrested.

Later, his administrative detention was prolonged for four months. Eventually, two suspects were indicted, one of them a minor. Ettinger was not directly linked to the attacks, and was released in June 2016. He was placed under several restrictions, which included bans from the West Bank and East Jerusalem, and he was barred from making contact with 93 people.

== Blog and views ==
Ettinger blogs for the far-right religious Israeli website Hakol HaYehudi (The Jewish Voice). He attacked the President of Israel, Reuven Rivlin for pandering to Palestinians, and thereby betraying the state. (Note: 11 August 2015.) Readers of his blog have the impression he is implying that the entire area encompassed by the Biblical Israel should be purged of both Muslims and Christians. He has called there for the "dispossession of gentiles", whose religions are deemed a form of idolatry, and wrote, when the Church of the Multiplication was torched near the Sea of Galilee:

"I don't know what those anonymous lighters intended to set alight, but that fire touched my heart."

On 22 July 2014, he wrote:

"The key is not to seek to delay the explosion, but to try to bring it on as soon as possible and on our own initiative."

== International sanctions ==
In April 2024, the EU sanctioned Ettinger along with several groups and other individuals. "The EU sanctions will include an asset freeze, a prohibition on provision of funds or economic resources to them or for their benefit and a travel ban to the EU for the individuals named.

In June 2024, Canada sanctioned Ettinger together with six other settlers and five organizations "for their violent and destabilizing actions against Palestinian civilians and their property in the West Bank.”

In November 2025, Singapore sanctioned Ettinger along with three other settlers for their involvement in "egregious acts of extremist violence" against Palestinians in the West Bank.

== Sources ==
- Bachner, Michael (1 June 2016). "Right-Wing Activist Meir Ettinger Released from Administrative Detention After 10 Months". Israel/Palestine. Tazpit Press Service (TPS). Archived from the original on 29 August 2016.
- Blumenthal, Itay; Zitun, Yoav (9 August 2015). "Israel places two radical right-wing suspects in administrative detention". Ynet.
- Chana, Jas (4 August 2015). "Israel Arrests Meir Ettinger, Suspected Leader of Jewish Extremists". Tablet magazine.
- "Detention without trial prolonged for Jewish extremist". The Times of Israel. Agence France-Presse. 23 February 2016a.
- Gershuni, Hillel (11 January 2016). "A Jewish ISIS Rises in the West Bank". Tablet magazine.
- Hicks, Robert Michael (2016). Few Call it War: Religious Terrorism: Then and Now. Morgan James Publishing. ISBN 978-1-630-47786-8.
- "In wake of firebomb attack, Israel expands crackdown on Jewish extremists". Deutsche Welle. 9 August 2015.
- "Israel jails two Jewish extremists for six months without charge". The Guardian. Associated Press. 9 August 2015.
- "Jewish extremist Meir Ettinger to be freed from prison". The Times of Israel. 17 May 2016c.
- "Jewish man charged with July murders of Palestinian family in Duma". The Times of Israel. 3 January 2016b.
- Juergensmeyer, Mark (2017). Terror in the Mind of God, Fourth Edition: The Global Rise of Religious Violence (4th ed.). University of California Press. ISBN 978-0-520-96516-4.
- Laub, Karin; Daraghmeh, Mohammed (15 January 2014). "Israeli settler attacks on Palestinians quadruple, says UN: Trees have been cut down, mosques defaced and farmers beaten". The Independent.
- Levinson, Chaim (1 June 2016). "Top Jewish Terror Suspect Meir Ettinger Freed From Israeli Detention". Haaretz. Archived from the original on 2 June 2016.
- Pollard, Ruth (12 December 2015). "Evyatar Slonim: Jewish terrorist or scapegoat for the state of Israel? 18 December 2015". The Sydney Morning Herald.
- Rudoren, Jodi; Kershner, Isabel (4 August 2015). "Israel Detains Meir Kahane's Grandson, a Scion of Jewish Militancy". The New York Times.
- Shalom, Oded; Levy, Elior (8 August 2015). "West Bank inches closer to boiling point". Ynet.
- Shalom, Oded; Erlich, Yifat (12 December 2015). "Meir Ettinger: The Face of Jewish terrorism". Ynet.
- Silverstein, Richard (2016). "Israel and the Closing of the American Jewish Mind". In Ehrenberg, John; Peled, Yoav (eds.). Israel and Palestine: Alternative Perspectives on Statehood. Rowman & Littlefield. pp. 41–63. ISBN 978-1-442-24508-2.
- Sterman, Adiv (7 January 2014a). "Palestinians capture and beat alleged 'price tag' attackers". The Times of Israel.
- Sterman, Adiv (9 January 2014b). "Kahane's grandson blames IDF for 'price tag' attackers' ordeal". The Times of Israel.
- "THE KACH MOVEMENT-BACKGROUND-03-Mar-94". Israel Ministry of Foreign Affairs. 3 March 1994.
- Weinglass, Simona (6 August 2015). "Who is Meir Ettinger, the Shin Bet's No.1 alleged Jewish nationalist". The Times of Israel.
