= Tabgha =

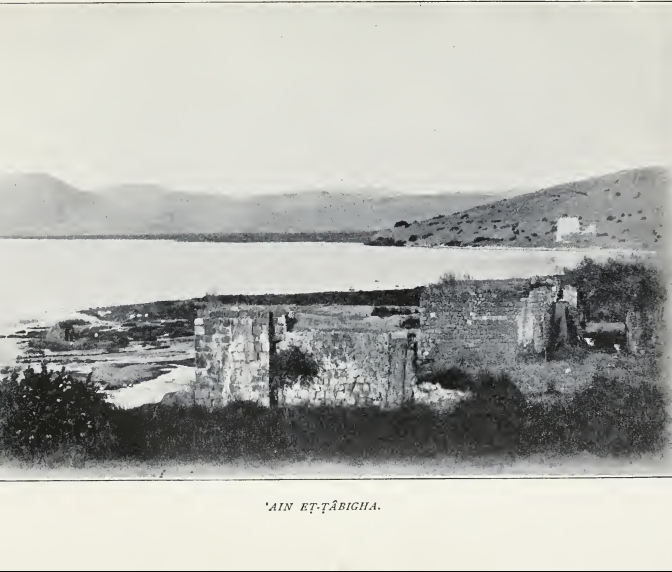
- Tabgha in 1903
- Etymology: From the Greek name "Heptapegon", lit. "seven springs".
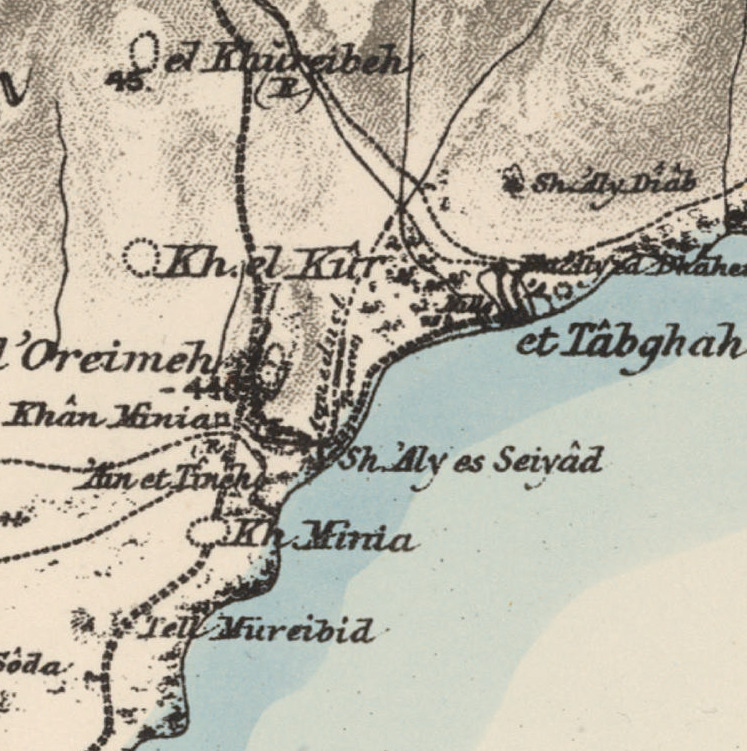
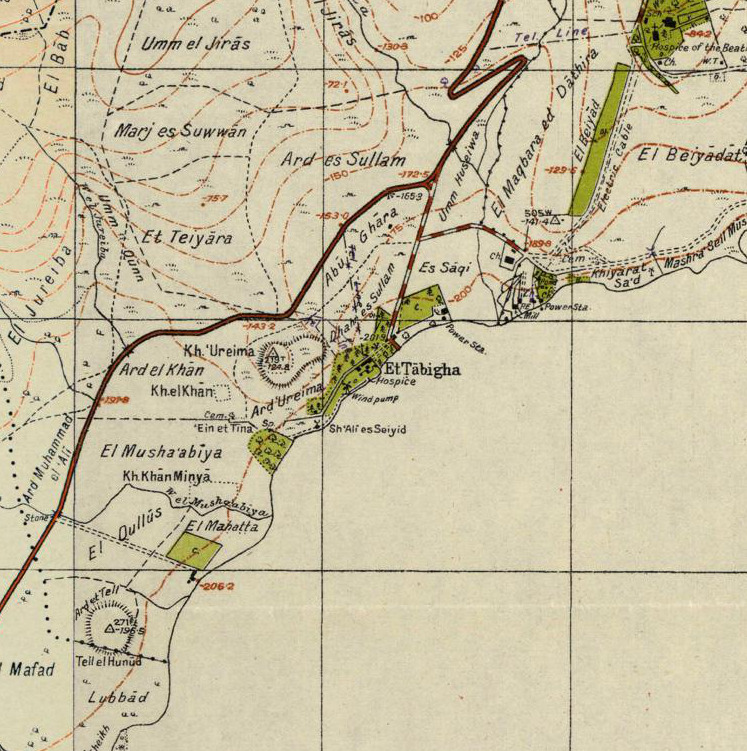
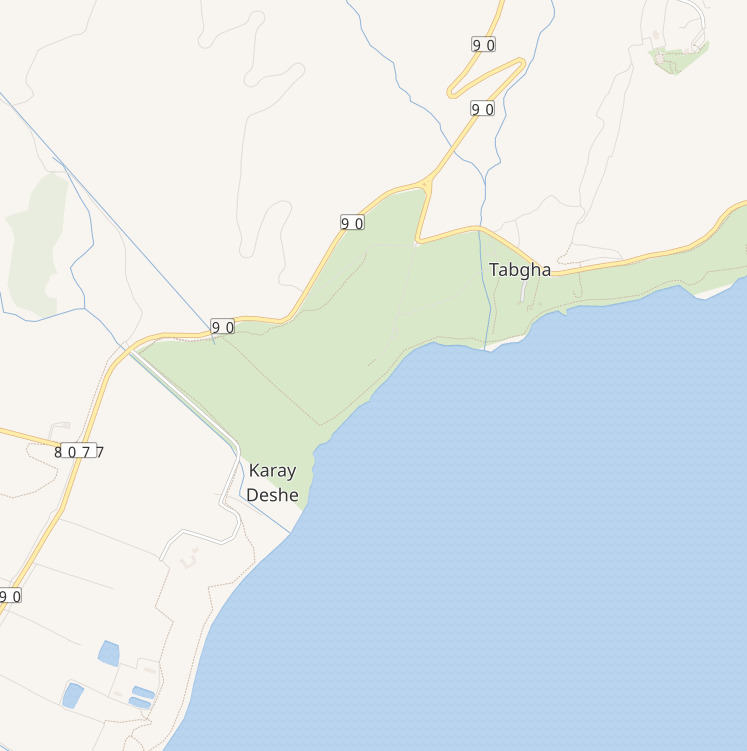
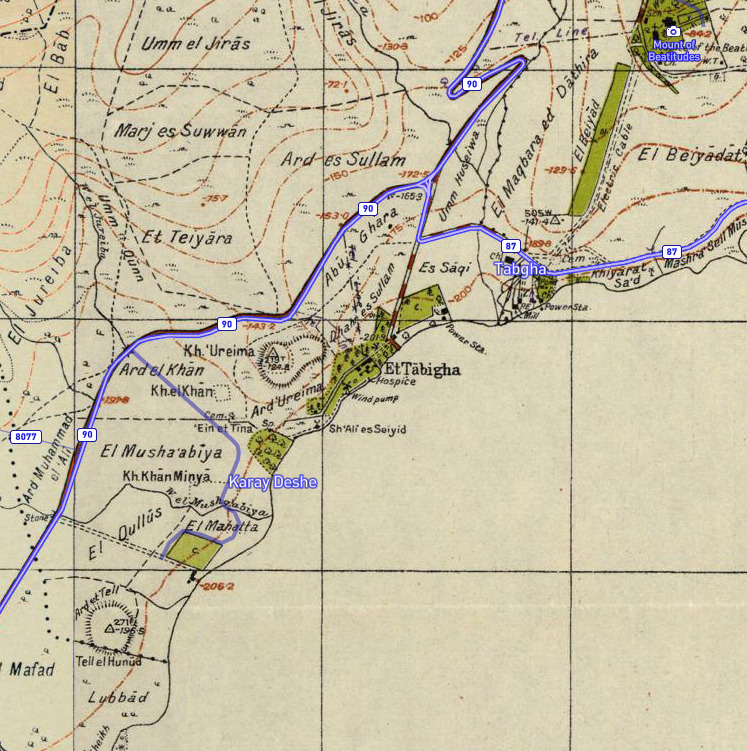
- 1870s map 1940s map modern map 1940s with modern overlay map A series of historical maps of the area around Tabgha (click the buttons)

- Location within Mandatory Palestine
- Coordinates: 32°52′10″N 35°32′37″E
- Palestine grid: 201/252
- Geopolitical entity: Mandatory Palestine
- Subdistrict: Tiberias

Area
  - Total: 5,389 dunams (5.389 km^{2}; 2.081 sq mi)

Population (1945)
  - Total: 330
- includes Tell el Hunud and Khan el Minya

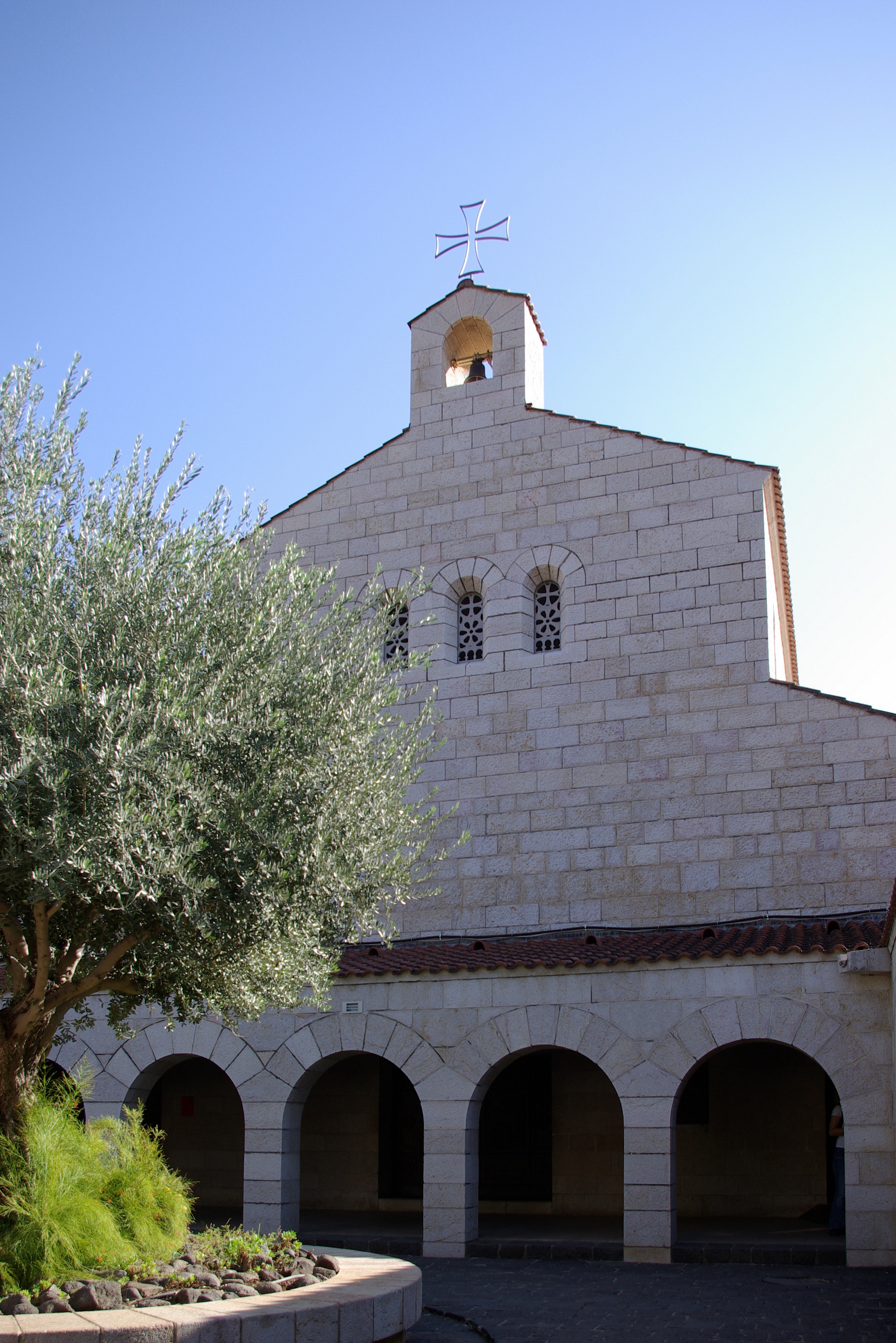
Church of the Multiplication

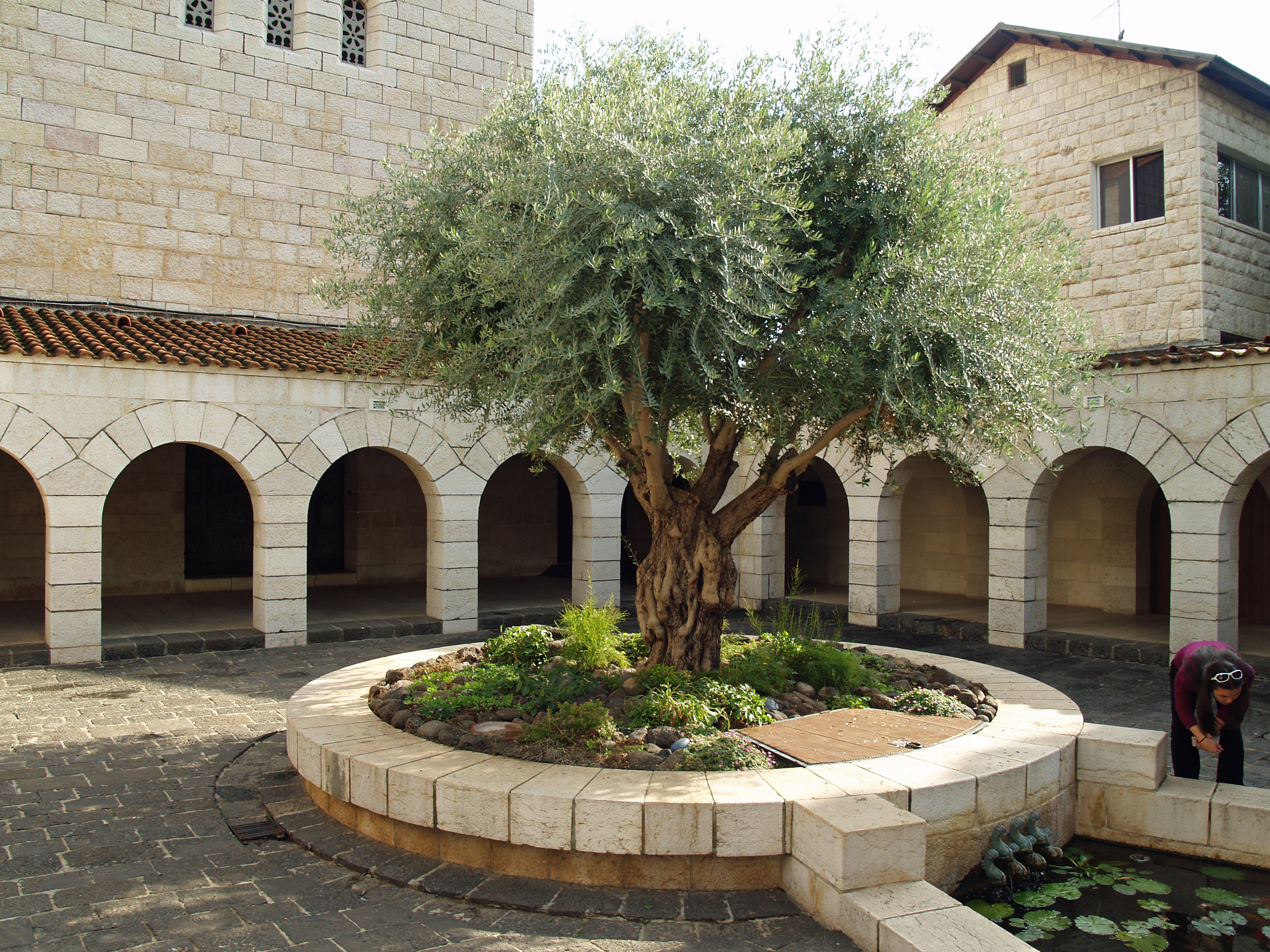
Church courtyard with olive tree.

Tabgha (Arabic: الطابغة, aṭ-Ṭābigha; Hebrew: עין שבע, Ein Sheva which means "spring of seven") is an area situated on the north-western shore of the Sea of Galilee in Israel and a depopulated Palestinian village. It is traditionally accepted as the place of the miracle of the multiplication of the loaves and fishes (Mark 6:30-46) and the third resurrection appearance of Jesus (John 21:1-24) after his Crucifixion. The village population was expelled in 1948 during Operation Matateh ("Broom").

== Etymology ==
The site's name is derived from the Greek name Heptapegon ("seven springs"). The name was later shortened to "Tapego", and was eventually changed to "Tabgha" in Arabic, since Classical Arabic has no p, g and o sounds and replaces these sounds by b, gh and a or u. St. Jerome referred to Heptapegon as "the wilderness/lonely place" (erêmos, as the location is also described in the Gospels).

== History ==
=== Byzantine period ===
In the Byzantine period, the water of the springs at Heptapegon was collected in three water towers: Birket Ali edh-Dhaher (Ali edh-Dhaher Pool) at Ein Nur Spring, Hammam Ayyub (Job's Bath), and Tannur Ayyub (Job's Kiln) and sent via an aqueduct to the Plain of Ginosar, where it was used for irrigation; the three towers seem to be recorded in the mosaic floor of the 5th-century Church of the Multiplication at Tabgha.

A map from Napoleon's invasion of 1799 by Pierre Jacotin showed Tabgha, marked by the word Moulin (mill in French).

The 4th-century tower-like octagonal reservoir at Ein Nur Spring and the aqueduct it connected to are traditionally attributed to Ali, a son of the 18th-century ruler Dhaher el-Omar. The reservoir is locally known as Birket Ali edh-Dhaher, "Pool of Ali edh-Dhaher".

In 1881, the Palestine Exploration Fund's Survey of Western Palestine (SWP) stated that the masonry of the structures indicates an Arab origin, thus agreeing with this tradition.

=== Crusader period ===
The area now taken by the Church of St Peter's Primacy was known during the Crusader period as Mensa Christi, or Mensa Domini.

=== Ottoman period ===
In 1596, as Al-Tabigha was part of the Ottoman Empire, a village was recorded, Tabiga, in the nahiya (subdistrict) of Jira under the liwa' ("district") of Safad, with a population of 8 households, an estimated 44 persons, all Muslims. It paid taxes on a number of crops, including wheat and barley, as well as on goats, beehives and orchards; a total of 3,290 akçe.

Johann Ludwig Burckhardt described the place as having a few houses and a mill, where the inhabitants were fishermen.

In 1838 Edward Robinson found here a small village, with one or two mills, built by Zahir al-Umar, but by then belonging to the government.

=== British Mandate period ===
In the 1922 census of Palestine, conducted by the British Mandate authorities, Tabagha had a population of 175; 157 Muslims and 18 Christians, (17 Roman Catholics and one Syrian Catholic). By the 1931 census the population had increased to 245; 223 Muslims, 21 Christians, and 1 Jew, in a total of 53 houses.

The number of people had increased to 330; 310 Muslims and 20 Christians, when the last census was made in the 1945 statistics. That number included Tell el Hunud and Khan el Minya. The total land area was 5 389 dunams. In 1944/45 the village had 7 dunams used for citrus and bananas, 287 were plantations and irrigated land, 2,728 used for cereals, while 2,367 dunams were classified as non-cultivable land.

On May 4, 1948, in Operation Broom, just before the outbreak of the Arab-Israeli war, Tabgha was attacked by Palmach forces, supported by the Alexandroni Brigades and local Haganah units. Its Arab inhabitants were expelled and their houses and tents were destroyed under orders by Yigal Allon.

== Church of the Multiplication ==
The earliest building at Tabgha was a small chapel built in the 4th century A.D. (around 350) by the Jewish convert to Christianity, Joseph of Tiberias. According to Epiphanius, Joseph was a contemporary of Emperor Constantine, a Rabbinical scholar, member of the Sanhedrin and a disciple of Hillel II. Following his conversion, Emperor Constantine gave him the rank of count (comes), and gave him permission to build churches in the Galilee, specifically, in Jewish towns which didn't yet have a Christian community, and the Galilee including the Sea of Galilee, was an area with a Jewish majority. This was probably the shrine described by the pilgrim Egeria at the end of the 4th century. The 4th century small shrine was dismantled in 480 and a bigger chapel was built by Martyrius of Jerusalem, Patriarch of Jerusalem from 478 to 486. Martyrius was Egyptian by origin, and this may be the reason why the floor of his chapel was covered with a beautiful Nile mosaic, a style of art popular in the Byzantine time, describing Nilotic landscape and the fest of the Nile.

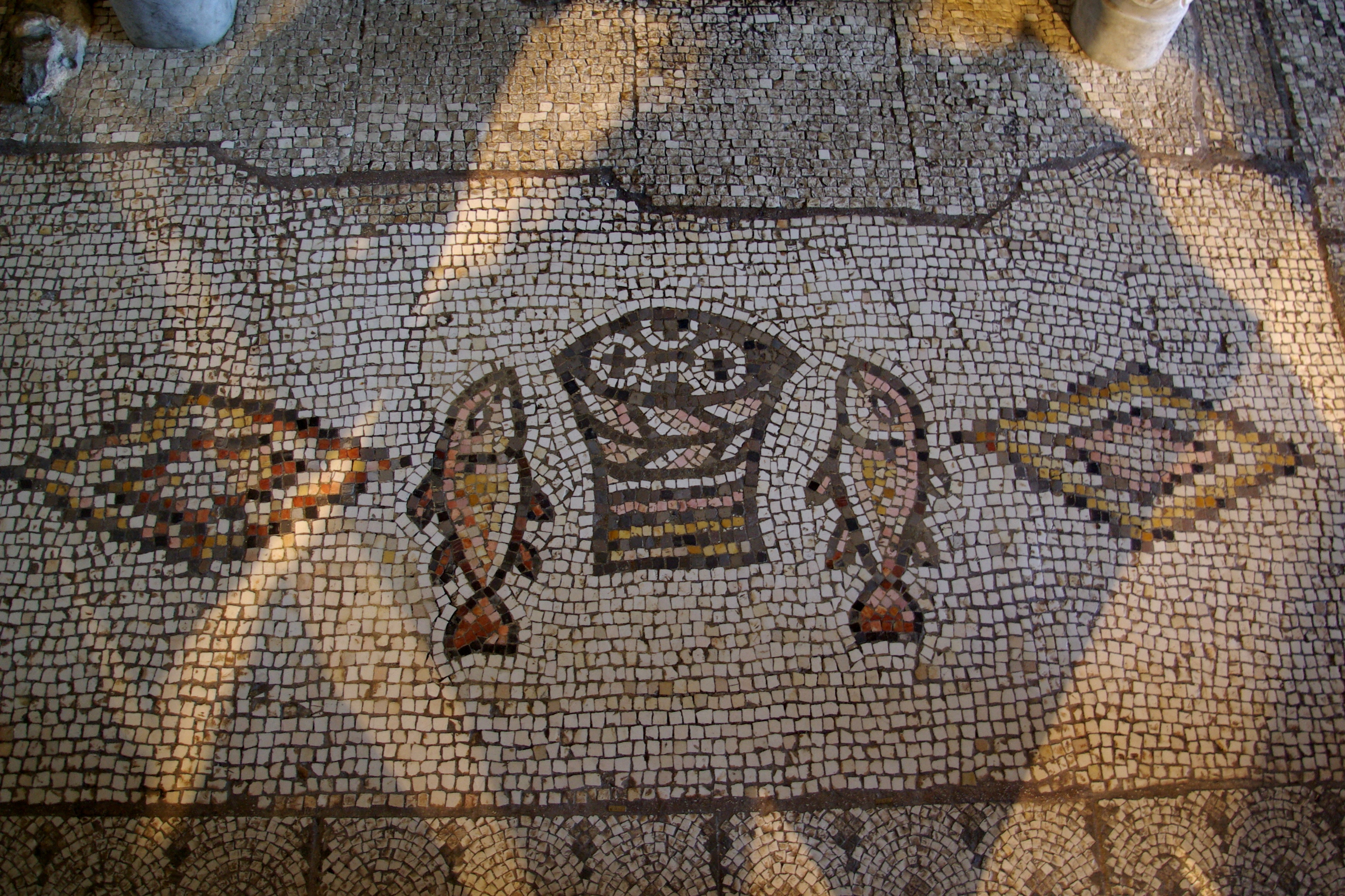
Mosaic of fish and bread on the church floor.

In the same place (not far from Capernaum) facing the Sea of Galilee is a well watered land in which lush grasses grow, with numerous trees and palms. Nearby are seven springs which provide abundant water. In this fruitful garden Jesus fed five thousand people with five loaves of bread and two fish.

The mosaic of the fish and loaves is laid next to a large rock, which has caused some New Testament scholars to speculate that the builders of the original church believed that Jesus stood on this rock when he blessed the fish and loaves just before the feeding of the crowd who had come to hear him.

The large monastery and a church were built in the fifth century. While some date the destruction of the site to the time of the Arab conquest, the church was most likely destroyed in 614 during the Persian invasion, for already in AD 670, Bishop Arculf had reported that only columns from the church remained. In any way, by the Crusader conquests the Byzantine site was forgotten, and rediscovered only in the 20th century.

The area's lands were bought in the 18th century by a Catholic German association, so they could build a hotel for pilgrims. As they began digging for the construction they discovered archaeological evidence of an earlier church, but could not make excavations due to the Ottoman law. Only in 1932, in the times of Mandatory Palestine. After nearly 1300 years of "solitude", two German archaeologists (Mader and Schneider) uncovered a number of the Byzantine church's walls and mosaics In 1981, after further excavations, the church was finally restored by German Benedictines to its Byzantine form, incorporating portions of the original mosaics. The windows are fitted with alabaster panels.

Today, the church and surrounding land are property of the German Association of the Holy Land (de:Deutscher Verein vom Heiligen Lande) whose head is the Archbishop of Cologne. The site is maintained by Benedictine monks from the Dormition Abbey, which is located on Mount Zion in Jerusalem.

=== Arson attack ===
On 18 June 2015, members of The Revolt started a fire that damaged the church and left Hebrew graffiti denouncing the worship of "idols." Israeli Minister of Public Security, Gilad Erdan, released a statement condemning the attack, saying "The torching of the church is a cowardly and despicable act which contradicts Israel's basic values." Adviser to the Catholic Church in Israel says the economic damage to the site could be "in the millions [of shekels]." Investigations by the Israeli police and internal security service led to the arrest and indictment of extremist Jewish Israeli youths associated with the "Price-Tag" movement, whose trial is still ongoing as of July 2016. As promised by Israeli president Reuven Rivlin and the Israeli government shortly after the arson attack, and following negotiations with the Ministry of Finance, first compensation payments were made in July 2016. Together with donations from Germany and the Benedictines, this allowed for the start of restoration works, which finish in the end of February 2017. In December of 2017, Eyal Reuveni was sentenced to 4 years in prison for the attack.

== Church of the Primacy of St. Peter ==
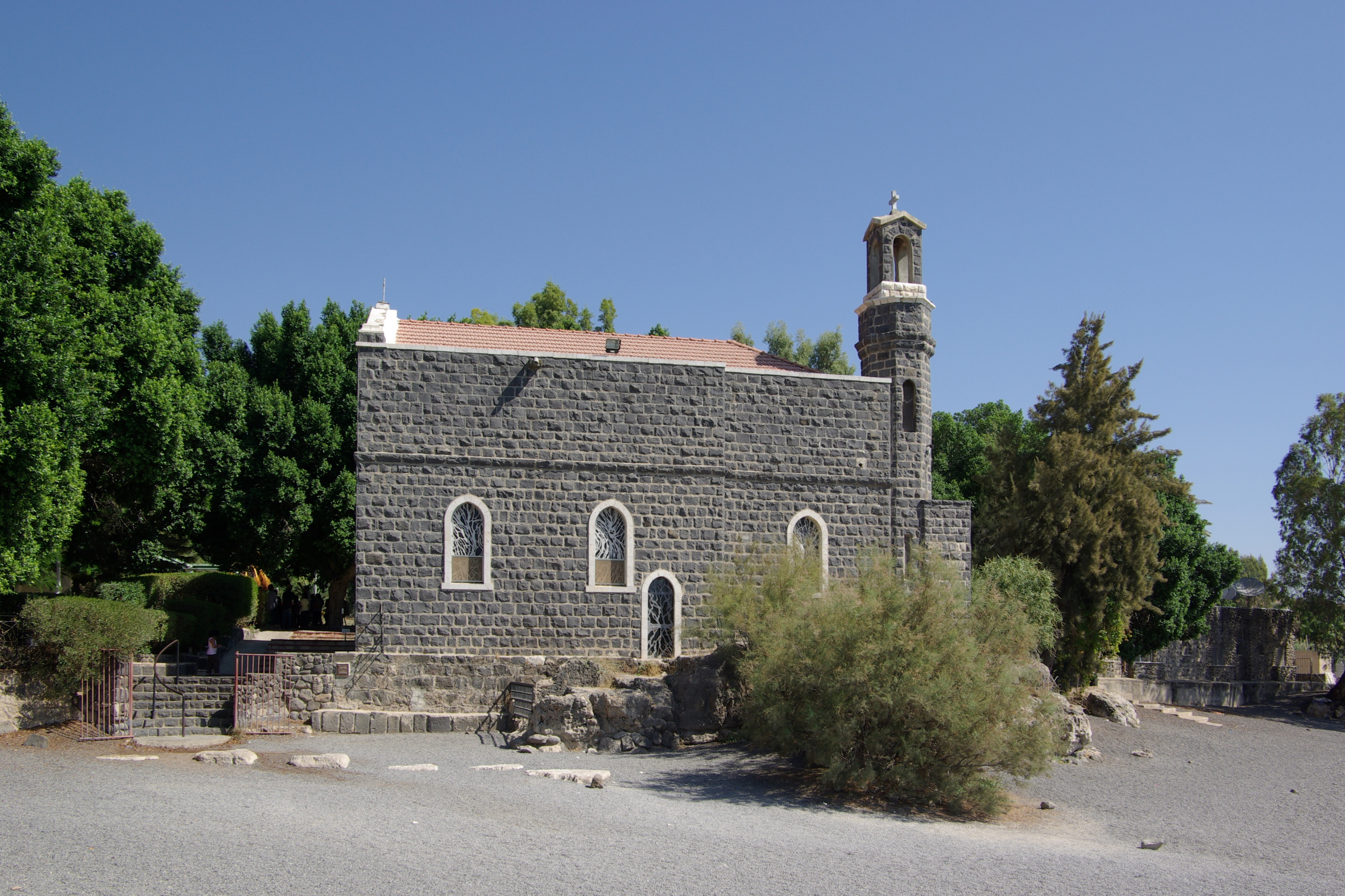
Church of the Primacy of St. Peter

The Church of the Primacy of St. Peter, just south of the Church of the Multiplication, was built on rocks at the shore of the Sea of Galilee, traditionally considered to be the place where Jesus appeared the third time after his resurrection (John 21:1–24), during which, according to Catholic teaching, Jesus again conferred primacy on Simon Peter.

== Endemic blind shrimp at Tabgha pool ==
The critically endangered, troglobitic, blind shrimp Typhlocaris galilea is endemic to Ein-Nur, a warm sulfuric and saline spring at Tabgha, whose water is collected inside a Byzantine 4th-century octagonal water tower. The shrimp is the most advanced species of a rare type of ecosystem, and the highest link in its food chain, at whose base stands a chemoautotrophic bacterium that can synthesise all necessary organic compounds using the sulfur from the spring water as its only source of energy, taking over the role played in most ecosystems by photosynthesising plants.

== See also ==
- Khirbet Minya - Umayyad qasr ruins
- Kinneret (archaeological site) - biblical city which gave the Sea of Galilee its Hebrew name; now Tell el-'Oreimeh (Arabic) or Tel Kinrot (Hebrew)
- Sea of Galilee Boat - fishing boat from the 1st century CE, preserved in a museum at Kibbutz Ginosar
- The German Association of the Holy Land, Catholic association running a pilgrims hostel and youth & disabled centre at Tabgha

== Bibliography ==
- Barron, J.B., ed. (1923). Palestine: Report and General Abstracts of the Census of 1922. Government of Palestine.
- Burckhardt, J.L. (1822). Travels in Syria and the Holy Land. London: J. Murray.
- Conder, C.R.; Kitchener, H.H. (1881). The Survey of Western Palestine: Memoirs of the Topography, Orography, Hydrography, and Archaeology. Vol. 1. London: Committee of the Palestine Exploration Fund.
- Government of Palestine, Department of Statistics (1945). Village Statistics, April, 1945.
- Guérin, V. (1880). Description Géographique Historique et Archéologique de la Palestine (in French). Vol. 3: Galilee, pt. 1. Paris: L'Imprimerie Nationale. (pp. 224-226)
- Hadawi, S. (1970). Village Statistics of 1945: A Classification of Land and Area ownership in Palestine. Palestine Liberation Organization Research Center.
- Hütteroth, W.-D.; Abdulfattah, K. (1977). Historical Geography of Palestine, Transjordan and Southern Syria in the Late 16th Century. Erlanger Geographische Arbeiten, Sonderband 5. Erlangen, Germany: Vorstand der Fränkischen Geographischen Gesellschaft. ISBN 3-920405-41-2.
- Karmon, Y. (1960). "An Analysis of Jacotin's Map of Palestine" (PDF). Israel Exploration Journal. 10 (3, 4): 155–173, 244–253. Archived from the original (PDF) on 2019-12-22.
- Khalidi, W (1992). All That Remains: The Palestinian Villages Occupied and Depopulated by Israel in 1948. Washington D.C.: Institute for Palestine Studies. ISBN 0-88728-224-5.
- Mills, E., ed. (1932). Census of Palestine 1931. Population of Villages, Towns and Administrative Areas. Jerusalem: Government of Palestine.
- Morris, B. (2004). The Birth of the Palestinian Refugee Problem Revisited. Cambridge University Press. ISBN 978-0-521-00967-6.
- Oliphant, L. (1887). Haifa, or Life in Modern Palestine. Edinburgh: Blackwood. (Oliphant, 1887, p. 227; cited in Khalidi, 1992, p. 542)
- Palmer, E.H. (1881). The Survey of Western Palestine: Arabic and English Name Lists Collected During the Survey by Lieutenants Conder and Kitchener, R. E. Transliterated and Explained by E.H. Palmer. Committee of the Palestine Exploration Fund.
- Pringle, D. (1998). The Churches of the Crusader Kingdom of Jerusalem: L-Z (excluding Tyre). Vol. II. Cambridge University Press. ISBN 0-521-39037-0.
- Rhode, H. (1979). Administration and Population of the Sancak of Safed in the Sixteenth Century. Columbia University. Archived from the original on 2020-03-01.
- Robinson, E.; Smith, E. (1841). Biblical Researches in Palestine, Mount Sinai and Arabia Petraea: A Journal of Travels in the year 1838. Vol. 3. Boston: Crocker & Brewster.
