= Hilltop 26 =

Illegal outpost in the West Bank

Hilltop, outpost or lot 26, was an illegal outpost, consisting of a mobile home, founded by Netanel Ozeri outside Hebron in the West Bank. It lay approximately 100 metres (330 ft) from the Kiryat Arba settlement, in the Beqa'a valley. At the time of its destruction. Despite court orders, he kept expanding his outpost, refused to bullet-proof the caravan, fence the area he claimed in, or accept protection from the IDF.

The settlement was dismantled on the night of 24 March 2003 by the Israel Defense Forces (IDF) due to a court order that established that the land belonged to Palestinian families who lived in the area. Ozeri's wife, Livnat, daughter of the Jewish terrorist leader Shaul Nir, stated on the occasion:

"I will overcome my personal pain. But what is so painful is the Hillul Hashem [desecration of the name of God] that was committed here. Seeing that the Arab houses are still standing, while Jews destroyed houses of Jews - this is an indescribable pain."

The settlement was the first to be destroyed during Ariel Sharon's second term of office.

== Netanel Ozeri ==
The illegal outpost made headlines following the death of Netanel Ozeri on 17 January 2003. Ozeri, who had been dining with his wife, 5-year-old daughter, and two friends, was killed in the evening by a 15-year-old Palestinian boy who was accompanied by another 16-year-old boy who kept look-out. One of the gunmen was subsequently killed by other Israelis present, while the second gunman was tracked and killed later by the IDF. Ozeri belonged to the banned extremist Jewish religious and nationalist Kach movement.

Netanel (Nati) Ozeri, born in Jerusalem, was a student at the Yeshivat HaRaayon HaYehudi established by Rabbi Meir Kahane, and was a study partner of his son, Binyamin Ze'ev Kahane, who was killed in a terrorist attack in December 2000. Ozeri later went on to teach at the yeshiva in Jerusalem, as well as in Kiryat Arba.

Ozeri was a leader of the Hebron community in terms of both settlement and Torah study/teaching. He was a great admirer of the terrorist Baruch Goldstein, who had murdered 29 Muslims at prayer in the Ibrahimi Mosque/Cave of the Patriarchs. His close friend, Noam Federman, said Netanel was "an interesting and unusual combination, the type of person who stood out as a leader. He was a man of Torah, and a man of action." Federman noted that Netanel not only established new illegal settlement outposts and interested youths in settling there, he also made sure to teach them Torah on a regular schedule.

Ozeri was denied a funeral for two days, as wrangling broke out over where to bury him. His wife wanted his body buried on the outpost site to establish a "covenant of blood" with the land. After a long burial procession involving several thousand settlers, lasting some 12 hours, in which his body was carried round Palestinian fields and vineyards by a large crowd that crushed the grapes and produce, shouted that Yitzhak Rabin was responsible for his death, during which Palestinian cars were set on fire, windows were smashed, and Palestinians beaten up. Netanal Ozeri was buried in the old Jewish cemetery in Hebron, after Dov Lior gave a ruling. The funeral eulogy was given by Shaul Nir, who called for revenge. During the procession, settlers went against Jewish custom by exposing his face. Several settlers were indicted for rioting and attacking Israeli policemen some days later. The incident appears in Dan Setton's documentary Israel's Next War.

== Re-esteblishment ==
In December 2022 Israeli activists from the Nachala organization atemted to reestablish an outpost at the spot named "Orot Netanel" (Lights of Netanel). On December 2025 a neighborhood was established at the spot.
