= Hilltop Youth =

Extremist Israeli youth settlers in the Israeli-occupied West Bank

- נוער הגבעות
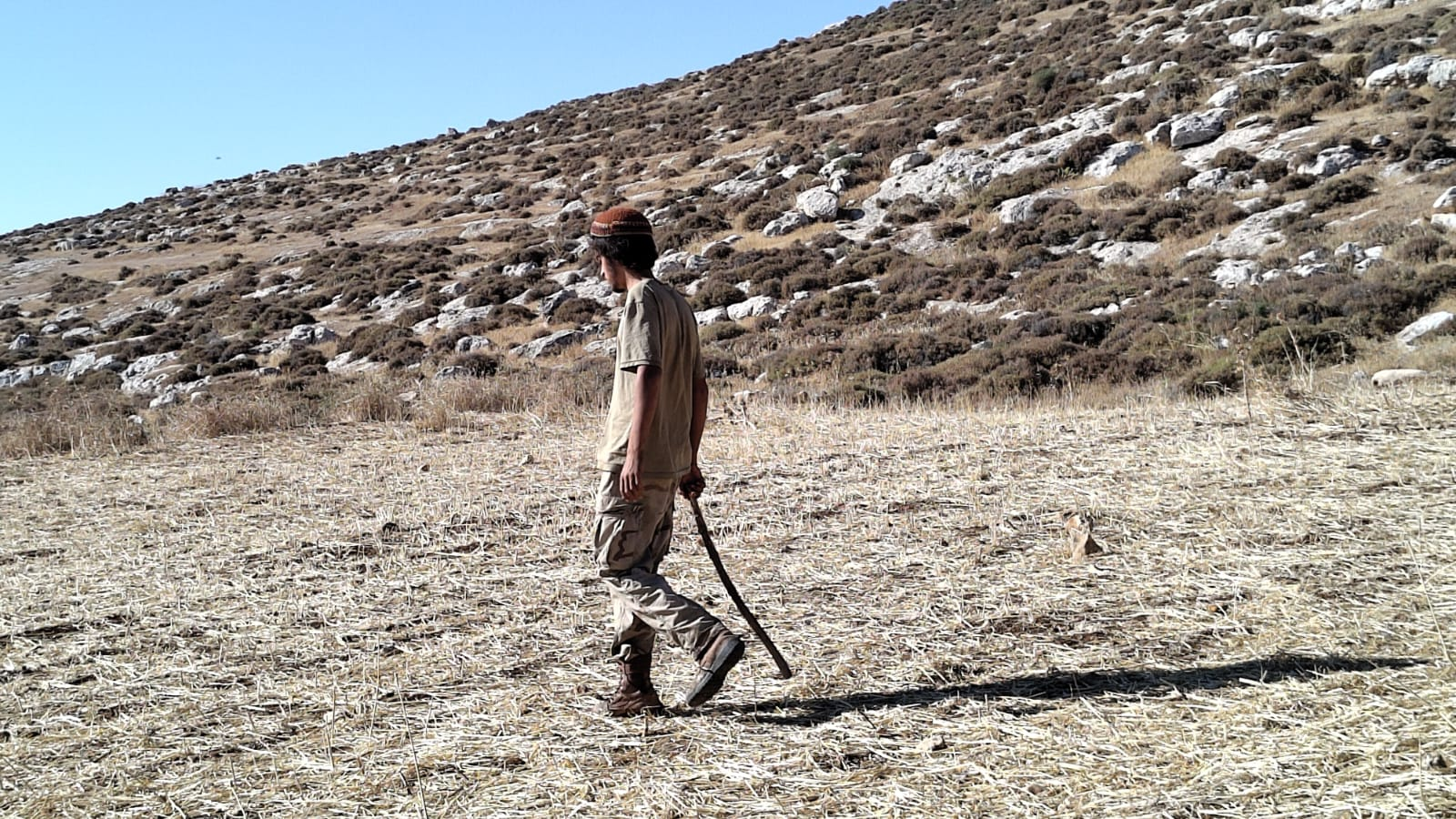
- A settler youth on private Palestinian land in Mukhmas in 2024
- Leader: Meir Ettinger
- Spokesperson: Elisha Yered
- Dates active: 1990s–present
- Active regions: West Bank
- Ideology: Kahanism; Jewish fundamentalism; Halachic state; Anti-Palestinianism; Anti-Christianity
- Status: Active
- Size: ~800
- Flag

Hilltop Youth (Hebrew: נוער הגבעות, romanized: No'ar HaGva'ot) is a decentralized extremist settler youth movement of Hardal origin operating in the Israeli-occupied West Bank. It is known for establishing outposts without an Israeli legal basis and conducting settler violence against Palestinians.

The Hilltop Youth often grow their hair into long, wide sidelocks (payot) and wear large knitted kippahs. Members have committed numerous acts of violence, including the Duma arson attack, Kidnapping and murder of Mohammed Abu Khdeir and Church of the Multiplication arson attack.

The group was sanctioned by the European Union and Office of Foreign Assets Control (OFAC) in 2024.

== Overview ==
The movement is based on the ideology of Kahanism, which advocates for the expulsion of Palestinian Arabs from both Israel and the occupied territories. Members have engaged in Israeli settler violence against Palestinians, as well as against Israeli soldiers.

The acts of settler violence includes the vandalism Palestinian schools and mosques, stealing sheep from Palestinian flocks, and the destruction of their centuries-old olive groves, or stealing their olive harvests. In the most notable attack, members of the groups perpetrated the 2015 Duma arson attack against a Palestinian family, burning their 18-month-old baby alive and injuring the parents. Though the group has no strict hierarchy, Israeli authorities believe Meir Ettinger to be its leader and Elisha Yered to be its spokesperson.

In 2024, following rising settler attacks, the European Union put Hilltop Youth as well as the related Lehava groups on its asset freeze and visa bans, declaring them to be extremist organizations.

== Origins ==
On 16 November 1998, in what was viewed as a declaration intended to thwart peace talks, and in particular the implementation of his political rival Benjamin Netanyahu's Wye River Memorandum with the Palestinian National Authority, the then-Israeli Defense Minister Ariel Sharon urged settler youth to "grab the hilltops", adding,

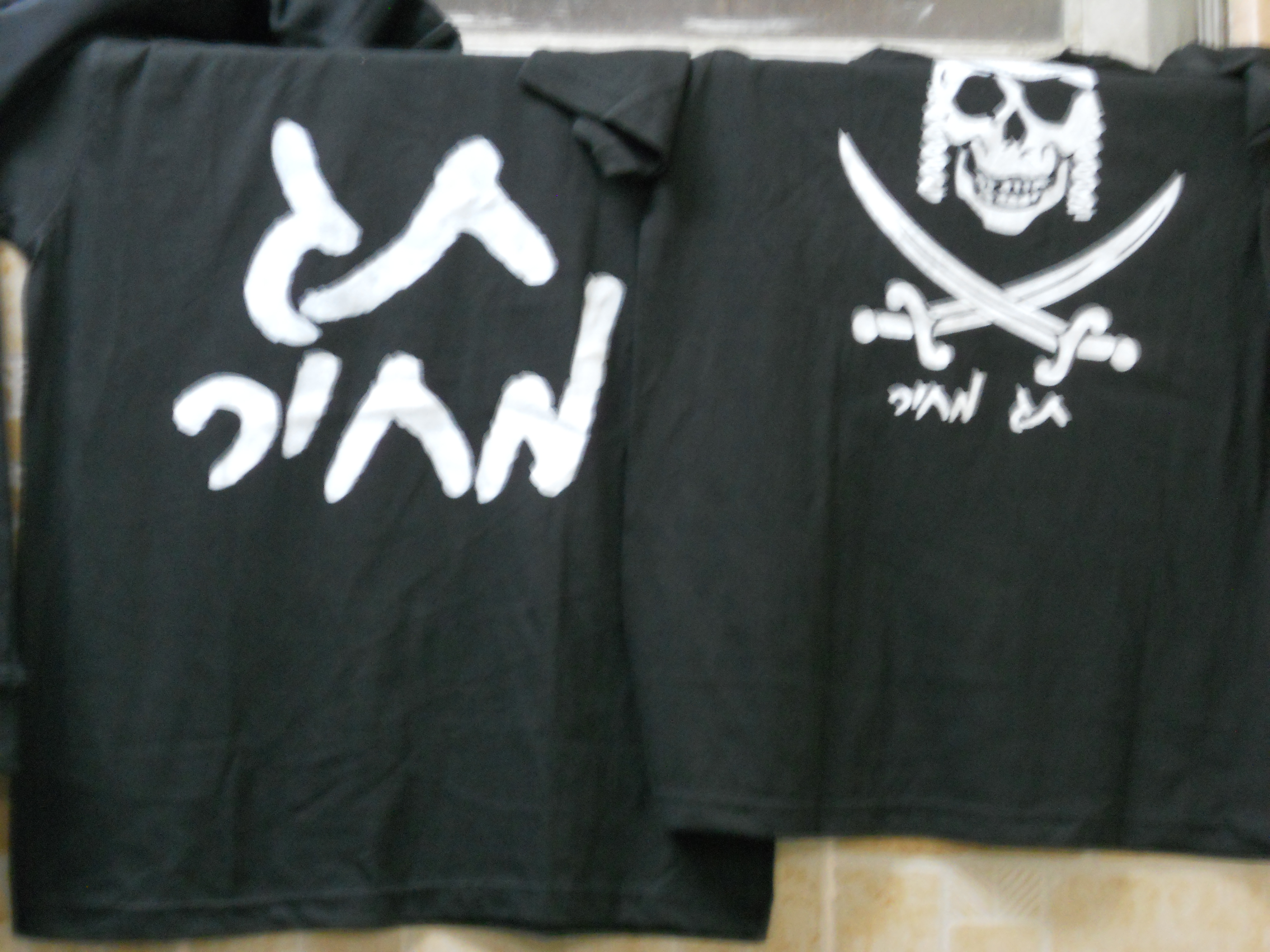
T-shirts bearing the Hebrew words “תג מחיר” (price tag).The skull with Jewish sidelocks (payot), a kippah, and crossed swords was also displayed on black flags in Baladim.

"Everyone that's there shouldmove, should run, should grab more hills, expand the territory. Everything that's grabbed will be in our hands. Everything we don't grab will be in their hands."

Settlers proceeded to heed his exhortation and outposts proliferated, in a practice often called "creating facts on the ground", but many would later feel betrayed by Sharon when the Israeli West Bank barrier he devised in 2005 cut off many of the illegal communities from the expanded Israel Sharon envisaged at that time.

The example of figures like Netanel Ozeri, who moved his family out of the safety of Kiryat Arba's perimeters to build an outpost, Hilltop 26, on nearby Palestinian land, was also important: Ozeri was later shot and killed by Palestinian gunmen.

== Ideology ==
Hilltop Youth attack an elementary school in Mu'arrajat, near Jericho in the Israeli-occupied West Bank, 2024

Terrorism expert Ami Pedahzur describes the group's ideology as Kahanist, meaning that it favours "deportation, revenge, and annihilation of Gentiles that posed a threat to the people of Israel".

Movement members are influenced by religious Zionist ideals, which include a dedication to building and farming the land, as well as devoting time to learning Torah. Many have studied in the Od Yosef Chai yeshiva under Rabbi Yitzchak Ginsburgh, who developed the metaphor comparing Israel to a "nut" which had to be cracked in order to allow the fruit, the people, out. In 2019, he published an essay Time to Crack the Nut updating this metaphor. In addition to basing their ideals on the teachings of prominent rabbis such as Avraham Yitzchak Kook and Rabbi Shmuel Tal, some regard Avri Ran as a spiritual leader, or "father", of the movement, though he does not see himself as such. The philosophy of some in the movement is expressed by a mixture of distrust of the Israeli government and a desire to re-establish the Ancient Kingdom of Israel.

== Activities ==
The Hilltop Youth are a "loosely organized, anarchy-minded group", of several hundred youths organized around a core of violent activists who are often noted for establishing illegal outposts outside existing settlements. According to Danny Rubinstein, the group are organized into private militias. In 2009, membership was estimated to be around 800, with approximately 5,000 others who share their ideological outlook. Members completely dissociate themselves from Israeli institutions, and identify instead with the Land of Israel. They settle on hilltops in areas densely crowded by Palestinians. Hilltop Youth members also received almost $40 million of food and clothing subsidies from the Israeli government, as well as protection by the IDF and other assistance.

Hilltop youth throw stones at rabbi Arik Ascherman, Mukhmas December 2025

=== Violence ===
Members linked to the group have been accused of engaging in Israeli settler violence, including vandalism of Palestinian schools and mosques, stealing sheep from Palestinian flocks and the destruction of their centuries-old olive groves, or stealing their olive harvests. This last practice was endorsed by Rabbi Mordechai Eliyahu on a visit to a hilltop outpost, Havat Gilad, where he issued a rabbinical ruling that, "The ground on which the trees are planted is the inheritance of the Jewish people, and the fruit of the plantings was seeded by the goyim in land that is not theirs." They seize land not by any official method: they claim a hilltop by setting up an encampment, and then claim the land nearby, whether under Palestinian cultivation or not, or by uprooting Palestinian trees and shooting in the air if any Palestinian comes near to the new outpost.

Settlers have long been accused of carrying out what are called "price tag attacks", a term used for targeting Palestinian property in revenge for outposts demolished by the Israeli military, although no one as yet has actually been convicted of having been involved in such vandalism.

In May 2025, during the demolition of three illegal structures in the West Bank, Hilltop Youth members threw stones at a bus carrying Israel Border Police officers.

On 30 June 2025, A group of extremist settlers, many identified with the Hilltop Youth, attacked an Israeli military base at Kafr Malik and destroyed military equipment at the place. IDF forces dispersed them with stun grenades.

Arson of a mosque by hilltop youth in the Palestinian village Mu'arrajat

Several commentators and research organizations have argued that portrayals of the Hilltop Youth rely heavily on the broader "settler violence" framework, whose underlying data and definitions are themselves disputed. A 2025 report by the Israeli NGO Regavim, False Flags and Real Agendas, critically examines the datasets commonly used by international bodies such as the United Nations Office for the Coordination of Humanitarian Affairs (OCHA), which are frequently cited in discussions of Hilltop Youth activity. According to the report, many incidents categorized as "settler-related violence" involve clashes between Palestinians and Israeli security forces rather than actions by Israeli civilians, and in some cases include Palestinians injured or killed while carrying out attacks. The report further argues that non-violent or indirect incidents, including religious visits, state-authorized infrastructure activity, and alleged trespassing, are incorporated into these figures, which its authors say inflates assessments of youth involvement. Regavim emphasizes that while criminal acts by Jewish individuals do occur, it characterizes such behavior as limited in scope and cautions against attributing these incidents broadly to the Hilltop Youth as a coherent or systematic movement.

=== Labor ===
Many of the Hilltop Youth feel that the mainstream settler movement has lost its way, opting for cheap housing close to major cities, built by local Arab labor, with tall fences and no space between their homes. The Youth often engage in organic farming and shun Palestinian labor in favor of Hebrew labor. 2.5% of eggs consumed in Israel are calculated to be produced on the outposts run by the Hilltop Youth leader Avri Ran.

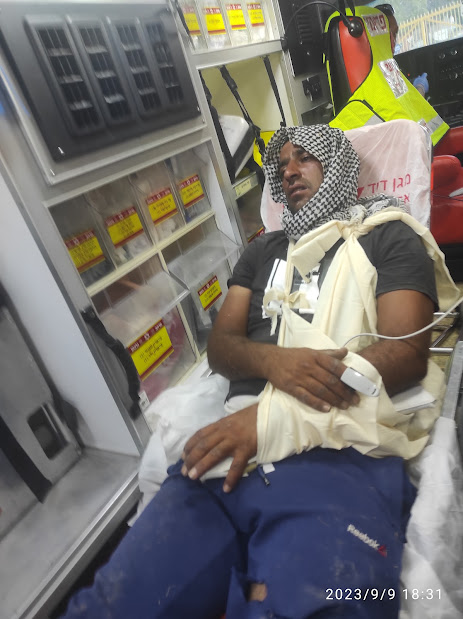
Wounded shepherd from hilltop youth attack

=== Expulsion ===
On 18 May 2025, settlers from Hilltop Youth built an illegal outpost 100 meters from Al-Mughayyir, Ramallah. The 150 Palestinian inhabitants were forced to leave their homes. The settlers harassed and threw stones at the Palestinian villagers as they tried to take their belongings and dismantle the buildings. Police and soldiers were present in the village but did not intervene.

== Government response ==
Hilltop youth threaten quarry workers in Taybeh, May 2026

The Hilltop Youth has been condemned in the past by figures within Israel's government, with Former Prime Minister Ehud Barak referring to the group as unacceptable "homemade terror, Jewish-made terror".

In August 2024, The Israeli Security Agency's head Ronen Bar wrote: "The 'hilltop youth' trend has long become a bed of violent activity against Palestinians … it's the use of violence to create intimidation", to "fear monger, meaning terrorism." Such acts were now "broad, open activity", wrote Bar, now "using weapons of war. Sometimes using weapons that were distributed by the state lawfully … attacking the security forces … receiving legitimacy from certain officials in the establishment". As a result, the hilltop youth experienced "loss of fear of administrative detention due to the conditions they get in prison and the money given to them upon their release by MKs, together with legitimization and praise".

On 1 July 2025, following Hilltop Youth violence against IDF soldiers, Israel Defense Minister Israel Katz declared that violence by Israeli citizens against the IDF or state property is a "red line".

== Notable members ==
=== Meir Ettinger ===
Meir Ettinger (born 4 October 1991), the grandson of Meir Kahane, previously resided at Ramat Migron outpost, and later the Givat Ronen outpost near Har Brakha, was subsequently deported, by administrative order, from the West Bank and Jerusalem, taking up residence with his family in Safed. He has attracted many followers and in addition to public speaking, he has published a blog at the pro-Hilltop Youth website "The Jewish Voice" (Hebrew: הקול היהודי). He was arrested for the "spy affair", when settler youths were accused of maintaining an "operation room" to monitor IDF movements and warn outpost settlers of impending evacuations. After violating his house arrest terms, he was held in jail until the end of his trial, in which he was convicted following a plea-bargain for conspiring to gather military intelligence and sentenced to time served, approximately 6 months. In August 2015, following the arson at the Church of the Multiplication in June and the Duma arson attack, he was placed under administrative arrest for 6 months, which was extended by an additional 4 months. During his incarceration, he staged a hunger strike. In June 2016, following his release, he returned to reside in Safed, and is barred by administrative order from entering the West Bank, Jerusalem, and Yad Binyamin. In addition, he is forbidden, by administrative order, from contacting 92 people.

== Sanctions ==
A threatening presence of hilltop youth in Wadi Auja aiming to discourage Palestinian herds from approaching the water source

In 2024, responding to rising Israeli settler attacks against Palestinians in the West Bank, the European Union put Hilltop Youth as well as related Lehava groups on its asset freeze and visa bans, declaring them to be extremist organizations.

== See also ==
- Israeli outpost
- Price tag policy
- Nachala (organisation)
- Israeli settler violence
