= Duma arson attack =

Firebombing of a Palestinian home in 2015 by Israeli settlers

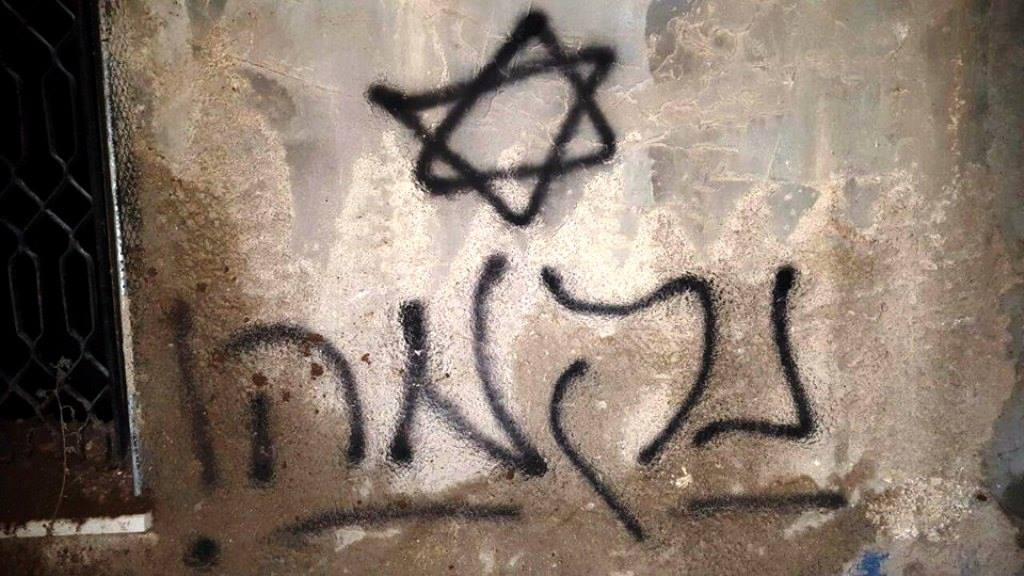
- "Revenge" graffiti in Hebrew, on the wall of the house after the attack

- Duma (State of Palestine)
- Location: Duma, Nablus, Palestine
- Date: 31 July 2015
- Target: Palestinian homes
- Attack type: Arson
- Weapon: Molotov cocktail
- Deaths: 3
- Injuries: 1
- Motive: Jewish terrorism

On 31 July 2015, Israeli settlers firebombed a Palestinian family home in the village of Duma, killing three people; 18-month-old Ali Dawabsheh was burned alive in the fire, while both his parents died from their injuries within weeks. On 3 January 2016, 21 year old Israeli settler Amiram Ben-Uliel was indicted for the murder, along with an Israeli minor, for participation in planning the murder. In addition, along with two others, they were both charged with one count of membership in a terrorist organization.

In 2020, Ben-Uliel was convicted of three counts of murder, two counts of attempted murder, three counts of arson and of conspiring to commit a racially motivated crime, as part of a "terrorist act". However, he was acquitted of the charge of being a member of a terror organization. He was sentenced to life imprisonment.

== Arson attack ==
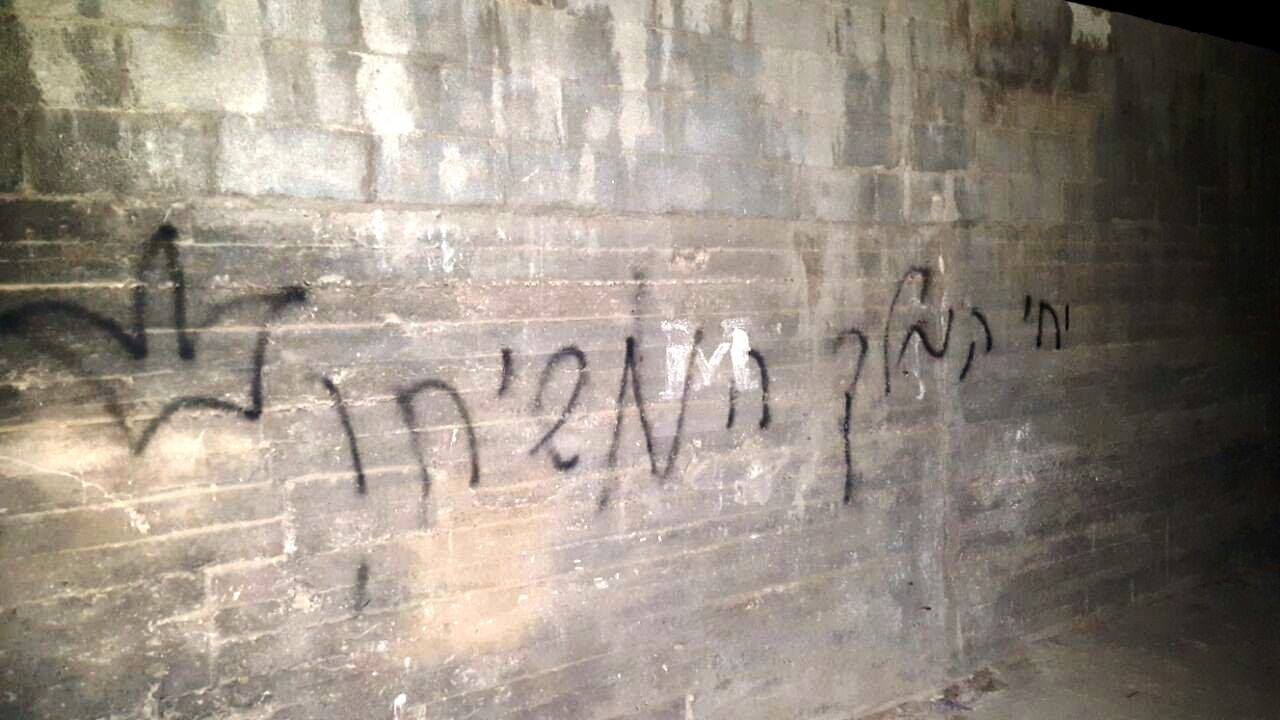
"Long live the Messiah King" graffiti in Hebrew, on the wall of the house

It emerged in investigations that the attack had apparently been planned in a cave called the "Red House" built from a previously existing Palestinian structure, on a site that was then turned into an Israeli outpost called Yishuv HaDaat. According to Rabbis for Human Rights, the state still plans to legalize this same outpost, though it was stolen through threats and violence from its Palestinian owners.

On 31 July 2015, two family homes in Duma, a Palestinian village in the West Bank, were firebombed by masked attackers. According to all reports, the first house was empty and they then went to a second house, where 18-month-old Ali Sa'ad Dawabsheh was burnt to death; his parents and 4-year-old brother were critically injured and rushed to Israeli hospitals, the father died of his burns several days later. Five weeks later, the mother, Reham Dawabsheh, died of her injuries.

According to local accounts, the family had returned home from a visit with relatives at around 1:30 AM, and sometime after they went to bed, between 2:00 and 4:00 AM, two masked assailants smashed windows and threw Molotov cocktails into the sleeping quarters. The IDF stated that windows had been smashed before the firebombs were lobbed in. Another report states that the house itself was doused and set alight. Neighbors stated that both parents emerged from their home enveloped in flames, and that two masked men were observed fleeing the scene. The newspaper Haaretz, however, reported that the torched houses were in the middle of the town, such that it would not have been easy for outside intruders to "make a getaway."

The family's neighbor Ibrahim Dawabsheh, a construction worker in the Shilo settlement, reported that he heard his neighbours' screams, and on running to the site, saw two men standing over Reham and Saad's burning bodies. They followed him when he retreated, until he was joined by his brother. The mother, Riham (27), herself engulfed by flames, according to her brother-in-law, grabbed a blanket in which she thought her youngest child was sleeping, and fled outside only to realize the child was not in the blanket. She had third degree burns over 90% of her body, and died on 6 September 2015. According to one report, the father, Sa'ad, managed to carry their son Ahmed, age 4, outside, while sustaining burns over 80% of his body. Another version reported that Ahmad was rescued by their neighbor, Ibrahim Dawabsheh. After undergoing treatment at the Soroka Medical Center in Be'er Sheva, Sa'ad Dawabsheh died of his wounds on 8 August.

Ahmad, who survived, suffered serious burns over 60% of his body.

== Victims ==
- 'Ali Sa'ed Muhammad Dawabsheh, age 1, burnt to death when home was torched, 31 July.
- Sa'ed Muhammad Hassan Dawabsheh, age 32, fatally wounded when home was torched, succumbing to third-degree burns over 80% of his body, on 8 August.
- Riham Hussein Hassan Dawabsheh, age 27, fatally wounded when home was torched, dying on 7 September.

== Investigation ==
From the first day, the Israeli authorities imposed a press embargo on the subject, banning the media from publishing any details or developments related to the investigation. On 31 August 2015, the embargo was extended by a month.

The Israeli investigators and international observers immediately suspected Jewish extremists of committing the attack. Several young men alleged to have been instigators were not native-born Israelis but came from American immigrant families. A manual of incitement written by Moshe Orbach, an Israeli from Bnai Brak, entitled "Kingdom of Evil," which provides details on how to set fire to mosques, churches and Palestinian homes, has also been mentioned in connection with the Duma attack. In February 2016 Orbach was convicted of sedition, the first time an Israeli court has found someone guilty of that charge in the last decade.

Israeli police initially suspected that the arson was a price tag attack by "extremist Israeli settlers"; some speculated that it might have been undertaken in retaliation for the demolition by the IDF of Jewish settlement structures in Beit El, 'the flagship of the ideological settler movement,' some time earlier.

In the Hebrew graffiti, the usual signature of "price tag" (Hebrew: תג מחיר, romanized: tag mechir) is lacking, and in its stead the slogans "Revenge," and "Long live King Messiah," (Hebrew: יחי המלך המשיח, romanized: yechi hamelech hamashiach) were scrawled. The latter is the religious slogan of the Meshichist wing of the Chabad-Lubavitch Hasidic movement. In addition, a resident told a reporter that he saw attackers fleeing towards the Israeli settlement of Ma'ale Efrayim. Police requested information from the public as they sought to identify the arsonists.

When suspicion fell on West Bank Jewish extremists, Morton Klein of the Zionist Organization of America alleged that Jews were being "falsely accused" of carrying out the attack, and he instead accused it as being the work of other Palestinians, as part of "an 18-year-old feud between Arab clans" in the village. Israeli Knesset member Oren Hazan, referencing a later separate fire at the house of a brother of Saad Dawabsheh that the Israeli and Palestinian authorities have reported to be unrelated to the arson attack, called for an investigation as he believed that the second fire may indicate that the arson was not committed by Israeli extremists.

Rabbi Shmuel Eliyahu claimed on 30 August 2015 on Ynet that "The way of terror is not our [Jews] way". Later, he claimed; "only someone who lacks knowledge in the nuances of the religious community would make such a mistake and assume that "Tag Mechir" activists will write "Yechi Hamelech Hamashiach" ("Long live King Messiah").

On 8 September 2015, a senior Israel Defense Forces officer told the media, that Israel "know[s] unequivocally that this is an act of Jewish terror." On 9 September 2015, Israeli Defense Minister Moshe Ya'alon issued a statement that said "there is a high probability that those responsible for the attack in Duma are part of a very extreme group of Jews" but that there is not yet enough evidence to arrest any suspects. Ya'alon also told a group of Likud activists that the identities of the arsonists are known to the defense establishment but that charges would not yet be brought to protect the identity of their sources. Later, Ya'alon clarified that security forces have only a "general idea" of who is responsible for the deadly firebombing attack ... calling on reporters to take a wait and see approach to the case". Ya'alon said the attack hurt the state of Israel and the settlement movement specifically. According to Sara Hirschhorn, settler rabbis and the leaders of American immigrant communities in the West Bank have been muted in their responses to the detention of suspects associated with their communities.

On 3 December 2015, it was cleared for publication that a number of Jewish suspects had been arrested in connection with the attack. The UN envoy criticized the "slow progress" in Israel's investigation.

Haaretz reported that the suspects were subjected to harsh interrogation methods after the investigation hit a dead end. According to unnamed sources, Israeli Attorney-General Yehuda Weinstein approved the use of these methods, and Prime Minister Benjamin Netanyahu was not informed of this until after the fact. In response to the allegations, Deputy Attorney-General Raz Nizri met with the detainees.

On 11 December 2015, one of the suspects was released to house arrest.

Despite acknowledging that the attack was "clearly a Jewish" one, and that Israeli authorities knew "who is responsible" for it, Israeli Defense Minister Moshe Ya'alon said that there is "not enough evidence" to detain or prosecute the suspects. The comments were decried by Palestinian rights groups, who noticed the swiftness of Israeli military actions against Palestinian suspects of attacks against Israeli targets, and accused the Israeli government of condoning settler violence.

On 15 December, the Israeli High Court of Justice denied a petition that the government take immediate "legal steps against the Dawabsheh family's murders".

On the evening of the 17'th of December 2015, Mako reported about a petition to leak the names of arrested people, within a few hours. "We are all with Zionist detainees" ("כולנו עם עצורי ציון"), in other sources "Duma Youth" ("נערי דומא"), leaked 100 names of people that had been allegedly held by security services giving three categories (administrative detention, custody and under active integration by the Shabak). Rotter News reported that the list is not credible as they believe the names are not connected to the investigation.

== Legal ==
On 3 January 2016, two suspects were indicted. One of them, 21-year-old Amiram Ben-Uliel, was charged with murder. At the time, Ben-Uliel resided in a vehicle on a hill above Duma in the outpost of Adei Ad. The second, a minor whose identity was withheld due to regulations exempting minors suspected of criminal acts from being publicly named, was charged as an accessory. The motive, as stated in the indictment, was revenge for the murder of the young Israeli Malachi Rosenfeld by Palestinians, near Duma about a month earlier. The indictments also included charges of membership in a terror organization, "The Revolt" group, who reportedly was founded in October 2013, and aimed to carry out terror acts against Palestinians, stir chaos in Israel, and bring about war between Arabs and Jews. The purpose was to cause the collapse of Israel's democracy to make way for a state ruled by a Jewish king according to Halachic (Jewish religious) law. Although The Revolt has no strict hierarchy, Shin Bet claims that the leader of the Revolt is Meir Ettinger, grandson of Meir Kahane.

Concurrently, the Rehovot Magistrate's Court sentenced right-wing activist Haim Auerbach for two years in prison for publishing the booklet 'kingdom of evil', detailing how to harm Arabs and giving guidance how to set mosques on fire, and in the opinion of the judges, there is a link between the publication of the document and the murder of the Dawabsheh family in Duma village.

On 1 June 2016, Meir Ettinger was released from a 10-month detention while being restricted from travel to certain locations and from communicating with 93 individuals.

In June 2018, the Lod District Court accepted some of the defense's claims and ruled out confessions obtained "under torture." However, it confirmed another confession, as well as a crime reconstruction by Amiram Ben-Uliel, and findings of a "dubbing exercise" of the minor. In July 2018 one of the defendants, who had confessed to four arson attempts and two acts of vandalism and hate graffiti against Arabs, was released on house arrest after evidence he gave was ruled to have been extracted under "torture."

In May 2019, the former minor in the case, now an adult, made a plea deal in which he confessed, and is expected to be convicted for conspiring to commit a crime inspired by racism, the crime being arson, not murder. The new indictment includes a determination that the youth belonged to a terroristic organization, Hamered (The Revolt), which he denies. In exchange the prosecution undertook not to ask for a sentence exceeding 5 and a half years of imprisonment under. The indictment states that he was not present on the night when the crime was committed. Nasr Dawabsheh, a spokesperson for the family, denounced the deal as proving "complicity of the Israeli judiciary in this horrible crime … This deal is unfair and encourages the settler gangs to commit more crimes."

=== Conviction and sentence ===
In May 2020, Amiram Ben-Uliel was convicted by the Lod District Court of three counts of murder, two counts of attempted murder, and two counts of arson, as part of a "terrorist act". However, he was acquitted of charges of membership of a terror organisation.

In September 2020, Ben-Uliel was sentenced to three life terms for murder, 17 years for attempted murder, and 10 years for arson. The minor who had been convicted of membership of a terrorist organization and involvement in planning the murders was sentenced to 42 months imprisonment and considered to have already served 32 months.

In August 2024 it was reported by Haaretz that Ben-Uliel has been receiving visits from Prison Service chief Kobi Yaakobi, which is unusual for such a prisoner. Yaakobi has been working to improve conditions for Ben-Uliel, as well as other Jewish prisoners convicted of violence against Palestinians, ever since far-right Knesset member Itamar Ben-Gvir became Minister of National Security at the end of December 2023. Among the perks Ben-Uliel has since gained are "emotional support" calls with extremist Rabbi Dov Lior and various items and books for the performing of religious rituals. At the end of the month, Ben-Uliel was released from solitary confinement and placed in the religious wing of the prison, as previously demanded by his supporters. Otzma Yehudit Knesset member Limor Son Har-Melech stated that Ben-Uliel is an innocent 'saint' whose life is one of holiness and piety, and whose suffering in prison is on behalf of all the Israeli people.

== Taunting of murder victims, relatives ==
=== "Wedding of Hate" ===
In December 2015, Israeli police began investigating a video of a Jewish wedding in Jerusalem celebrating the marriage of a person known to have been involved in price tag attacks, in which guests are shown stabbing a photo of the toddler, Ali Dawabsheh, who had died in the Duma arson attack. The same video contained scenes of guests, armed with guns, knives and Molotov cocktails, chanting a song with the words from the book of Judges (16:28), "O God, that I may be this once avenged of the Philistines for my two eyes", replacing "Philistines" with "Palestinians". A lawyer for the defendants in the case, attorney Itamar Ben-Gvir, now Minister of National Security, was also present and later said "No one realized these were photos of a member of the Dawabsheh family", talking of the toddler photo which was stabbed and then burnt by wedding guests. Such scenes are reported to be typical of many such weddings.

In October 2016, an indictment for alleged incitement to violence or terror was filed against five minors who participated in the taunting. One of the minors was additionally charged with deliberate property damage. In October 2018, state prosecutors claimed to have lost video evidence of the taunting. Honenu issued a joint statement by the defendants' attorneys, saying, "The loss casts doubt on the ability to prosecute the case."

=== Grandfather taunted outside court ===
Hussein Dawabsheh, the grandfather, was taunted by Jewish settlers outside the court proceedings who were supportive of the defendant. They chanted in Arabic "Where's Ali? There's no Ali. Ali is burned. On the fire. Ali is on the grill" and "Where is Ali? Where is Riham? Where is Saad? It's too bad Ahmed didn't burn as well." Police and court officials present did not interfere. Israeli Arab parliamentarian Ahmad Tibi put up as video capturing the incident.

== Response ==
The Palestine Liberation Organisation, the biggest party within the Palestinian Authority, held the Israeli government "fully responsible for the brutal assassination" of the child and said that, "This is a direct consequence of decades of impunity given by the Israeli government to settler terrorism".

On 31 July 2015, Prime Minister Benjamin Netanyahu in his phone call to Palestinian President Mahmoud Abbas has expressed "shock and horror" at an arson attack telling him that "it's upon us to together fight terror, no matter which side perpetrates it".

The European Union and U.S. condemned the attack and the U.S also urged "all sides to maintain calm and avoid escalating tensions in the wake of this tragic incident." Israeli President Reuven Rivlin stood out among Jewish Israeli politicians for his condemnation of Jewish terror, for which he received a slew of death threats on social media by Israelis who additionally called him a "traitor" and "Arab terrorist".

In the aftermath of the incident, it was noted that the family was not entitled to compensation for the terror attack, and calls have been made to extend to Palestinian victims of Jewish terrorism compensation which so far is reserved exclusively for Israeli victims of Palestinian terrorism. That Ahmad Dawabsheh, the 6-year-old who is the sole survivor of the arson, is not entitled to compensation was reiterated in April 2017 by Defense Minister Avigdor Liberman in response to a request from Joint (Arab) List MK Yousef Jabareen.

B'tselem stated that Israeli condemnations would remain mere rhetoric if such attacks were allowed to continue, noting that in the past three years nine Palestinian homes had been subject to firebombing and no one has yet to be incriminated in any of the cases. Yuval Diskin, ex-head of the Shin Bet intelligence agency, reflecting on Israel's response to such attacks, stated that an anarchistic state was being formed in southern West Bank which was violent and developing racist ideologies and that these are being handled tolerantly by the Israeli judicial system. He claimed that, in this part of the West Bank, 'law enforcement is shockingly weak towards Jews.' According to the UN, since the beginning of 2015 at least 120 settler attacks have been documented in West Bank, and Yesh Din statistics suggest over 92.6% of Palestinian complaints lodged with Israeli security forces never led to charges being filed.

Palestinians responded to the arson with large protests that resulted in violent confrontation with the Israeli forces. One Palestinian, 17-year-old Laith al-Khaldi, was shot by the IDF and later died of his wounds in a Ramallah hospital. 2,000 Israelis gathered in Tel Aviv in a rally organized by Peace Now to protest the incident, and hundreds attended a protest in Jerusalem against the arson.

On 2 August 2015, the Israeli cabinet approved applying administrative detention measures, hitherto used solely against Palestinian suspects, also against Jewish Israeli citizens suspected of participating in terror attacks against Palestinians.

After the attack, villagers started patrolling the village to protect it from Israeli settlers.

On 4 August 2015, the police requested information from the public as they sought to identify the arsonists. Elisha Odess (aged 17, at the time), who was put under home detention the day after the Dumas firebombing and detained on 25 November as a suspect, has dual Israeli-American citizenship. He and the other suspects are described as coming from "the heart of the settlement movement, the byproduct of its educational system".

Bayit Yehudi leader Naftali Bennett, commenting on the flood of emails from people claiming they would no longer vote for his party because of his defense of the Shin Bet's Jewish Agency, which is investigating the crime, said Ben-Gvir, the suspects' Kahanist attorney, was a genius running a propaganda campaign for their release. Their interrogation, in Nahum Barnea's words, was being portrayed as "a long and arduous physical and mental torture. The suspects' bodies were stretched and shrunk on a Procrustean bed; they were electrocuted; they were sexually harassed, suffered kicking to the chest, bruising, slapping; a female interrogator groped them." Bennett argues that, "Those who support the use of exceptional methods against Palestinian terrorism, should support the use of exceptional methods against Jewish terrorism."

== Reprisals ==
On 14 August 2015, a gas station was firebombed on Route 60 near the West Bank settlement Eli. Later, two Palestinian from Awarta, members of the PFLP, claimed the attack was a retaliation for the firebombing at Duma.

Several media outlets have additionally attributed the wave of stabbing attacks by Palestinians from late 2015 through 2016 at least partly to the Duma arson killings as well as Israeli delays in pressing charges against any suspects.
