= Church of the Multiplication =

Roman Catholic Church in Israel

Coordinates: 32°52′24″N 35°32′55″E

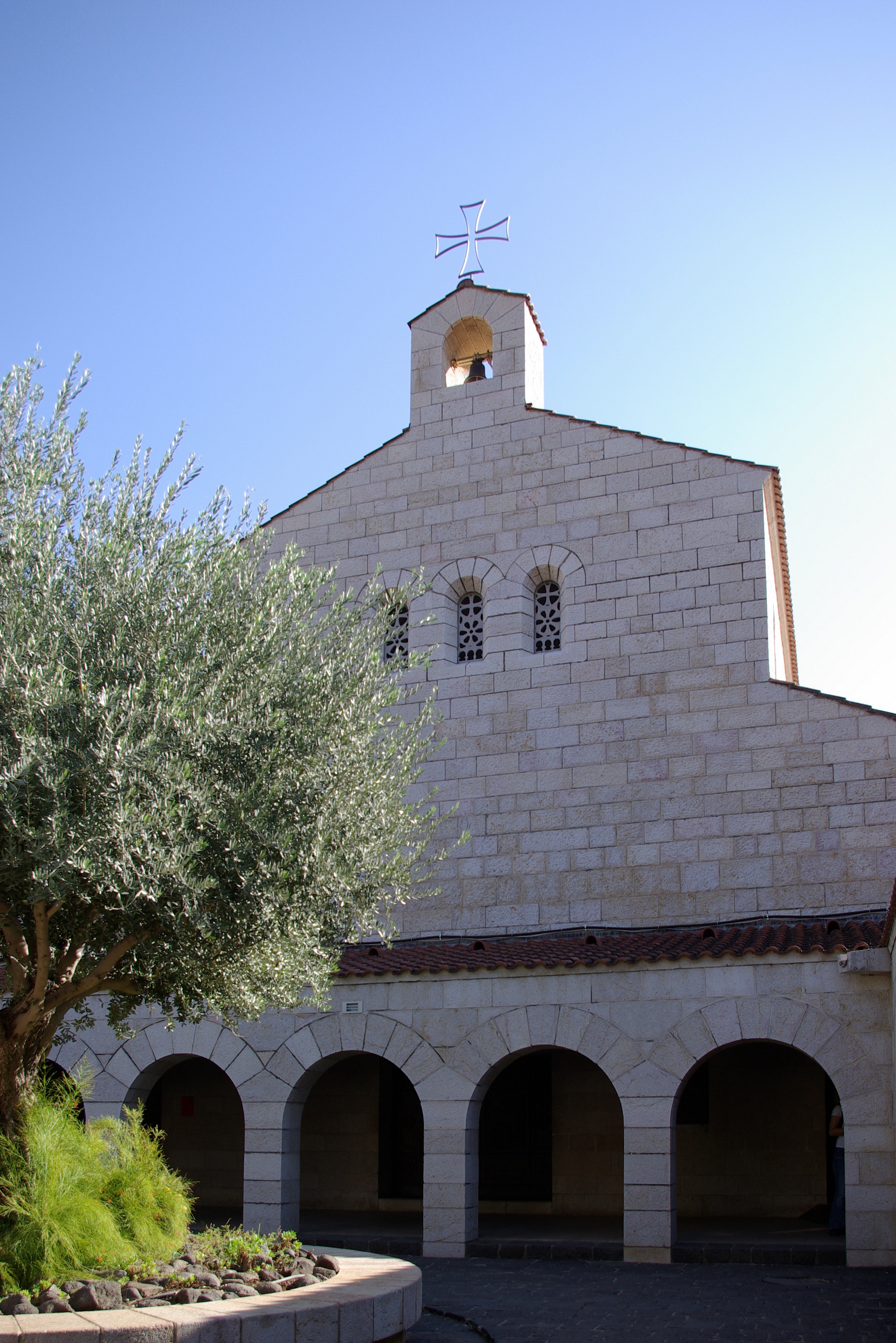
- Exterior of the church

Religion
- Affiliation: Roman Catholic
- Leadership: Benedictines
- Year consecrated: 1982

Location
- Location: Tabgha, Israel
- Interactive map of Church of the Multiplication

Architecture
- Completed: 1982

The Church of the Multiplication of the Loaves and Fish (Latin: Ecclesia multiplicationis panum et piscium), shortened to the Church of the Multiplication, is a Roman Catholic church located at Tabgha, on the northwest shore of the Sea of Galilee in Israel. The modern church rests on the site of two earlier churches.

== Religious affiliation ==
The church is maintained and overseen by the Benedictine Order.

== History ==
=== First Byzantine church (4th century) ===
The first church, built alongside the important road that passes by, was erected around 350 AD by Joseph of Tiberias. It was first mentioned by Egeria in 380.

=== Second Byzantine church (5th century) ===
The church was significantly enlarged around the year 480, with floor mosaics also added at this time. These renovations are attributed to the Patriarch Martyrius of Jerusalem. In AD 614 Persians destroyed the Byzantine church.

=== 19th-20th-century rediscovery ===
After the AD 614 destruction, the exact site of the shrine was lost for some 1,300 years. In 1888 the site was acquired by the German Catholic Society for Palestine (Palästina-Verein der Katholiken Deutschlands) which was associated with the Archdiocese of Cologne. An initial archaeological survey was conducted in 1892, with full excavations beginning in 1932. These excavations resulted in the discovery of mosaic floors from the 5th-century church, which was also found to be built on the foundations of a much smaller 4th-century chapel.

=== 20th-century reconstruction ===
Since 1939 the property has been administered by the Benedictine order as a daughter-house of the Dormition Abbey in Jerusalem. The current church, inaugurated in 1984, was built to the same floor plan as the 5th-century Byzantine church, some of the ancient black basalt walls have survived and remain visible. The Cologne-based architects Anton Goergen and Fritz designed a simple, modest building in a somewhat neo-Byzantine style. The windows are fitted with alabaster panels. The bright limestone blocks were brought from a quarry near Taybeh (between Jericho and Ramallah), the red bricks from Italy and the roof timbering from Germany. The portal is a work by the German sculptor Elmar Hillebrand.

==== Arson attack ====
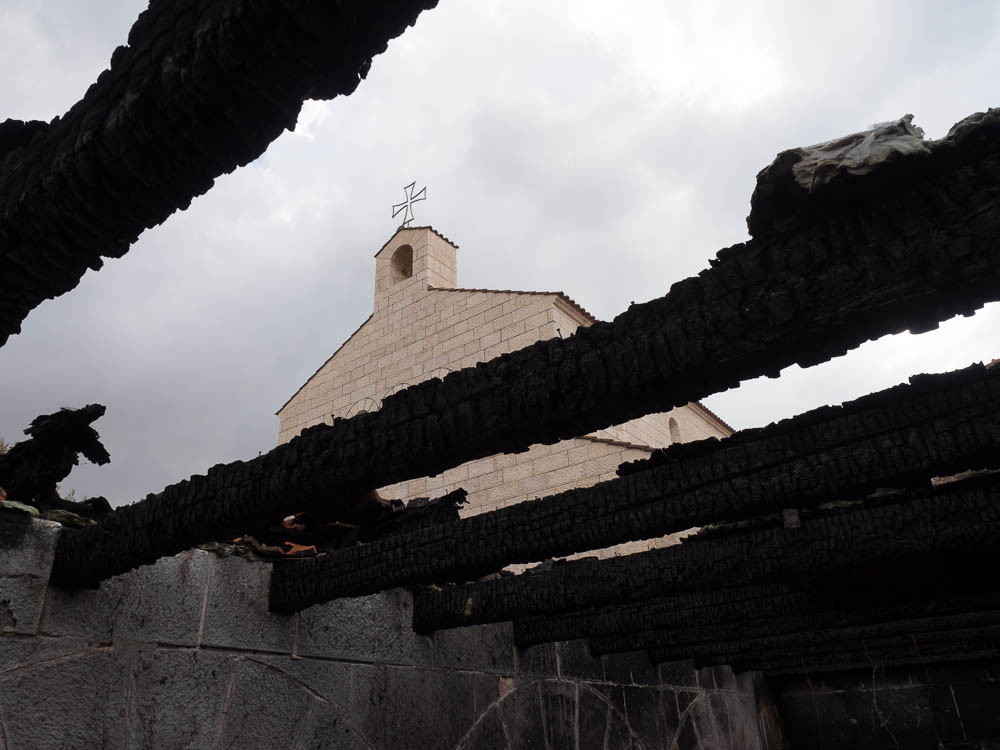
View of the Church of the Multiplication through the burnt roof of an auxiliary building.

On 17 June 2015, an auxiliary building next to the church was significantly damaged by an arson attack committed by Jewish extremists. Hebrew graffiti, with the words "false idols will be smashed", taken from the Jewish prayer Aleinu, was sprayed on the walls of the adjacent dormitory. This incident followed a series of arson and graffiti attacks by Jewish extremists against Christian sites. Israeli officials have labeled the attack as "terrorism". "Whatever repairs are not covered by insurance must be paid for by the Israeli government", said Wadie Abunassar, media spokesman for the Assembly of Catholic Ordinaries of the Holy Land. "We believe this attack was tantamount to a terror attack, and when there is a terror attack the state is responsible for paying for compensation and prosecutes the perpetrators."

In late July 2015, four Israeli Jews age 18 to 24 and an unnamed minor were arrested by the Israel police and indicted for the arson. The suspects are reportedly associated with the Jewish extremist, ultra-nationalist Hilltop Youth. In February 2017, the church was reopened.

== Interior ==
=== Layout ===
The interior of the church has a central nave and two aisles. The sanctuary is backed by an apse with transepts on either side. Under the altar is a block of limestone found during excavation, that is venerated as the stone on which the miraculous meal was laid.

=== Mosaics ===
One of the main highlights of the church are its restored 5th-century mosaics. These are the earliest known examples of figurative floor mosaics in Christian art in the Holy Land. The mosaics in the two transepts depict various wetland birds and plants, with a prominent place given to the lotus flower. This flower, which is not indigenous to the area, suggests the artist's use of a Nilotic landscape popular in Roman and Early Byzantine art. All the other motifs depict plants and animals from the Galilee. The mosaic found in front of the altar depicts two fish flanking a basket containing four loaves of bread.

=== Fourth- and fifth-century remains ===
Also preserved in the modern church are the sill of the left entrance to the atrium, basalt paving stones, and part of the apse frieze. The foundations of the original 4th-century church can also be seen under a glass panel to the right of the altar.

== Outside the atrium ==
A basalt-made oil press is displayed in the courtyard, as is a baptismal font outside of it.

== Gallery ==
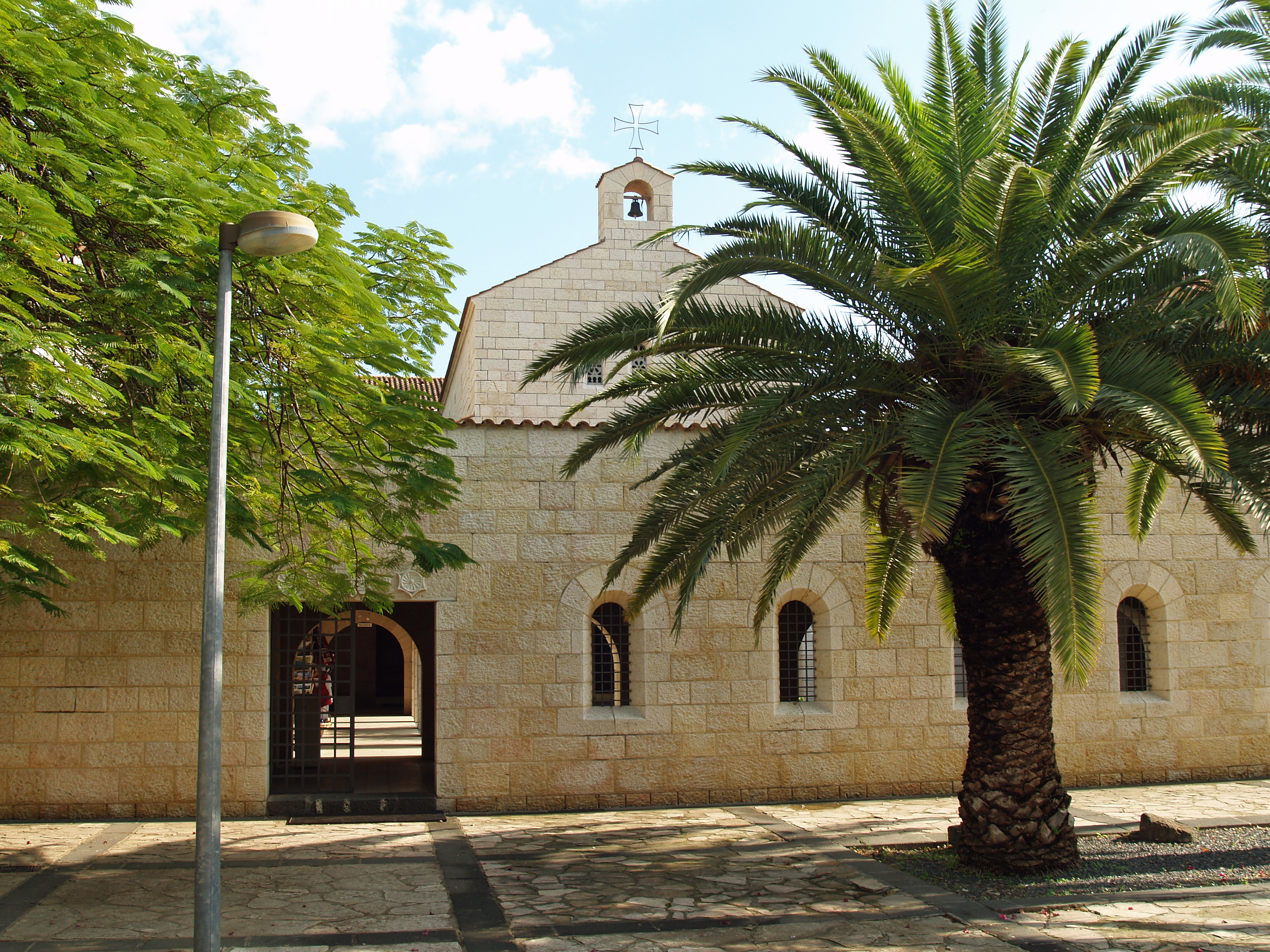
Exterior of the church

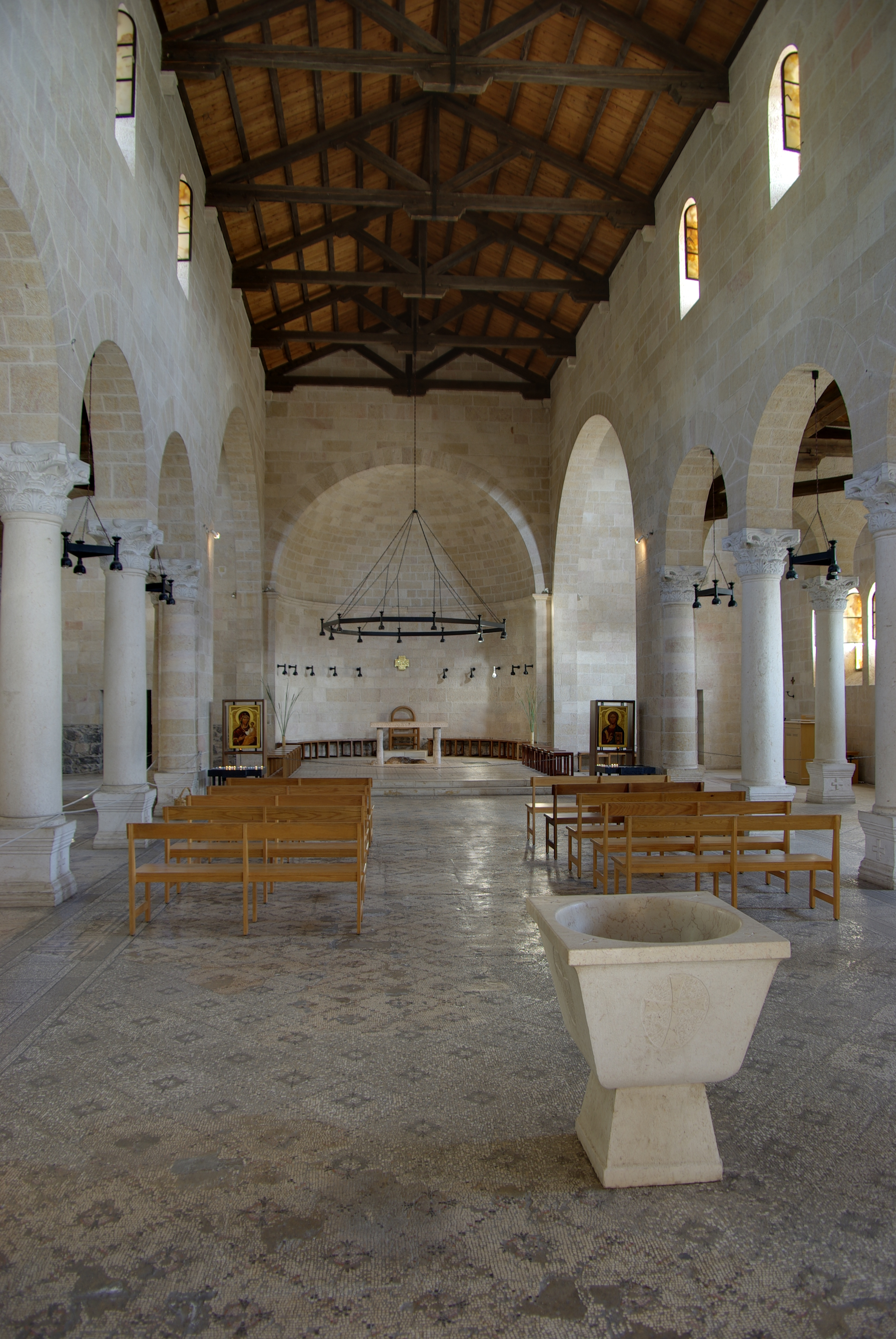
Interior of the church

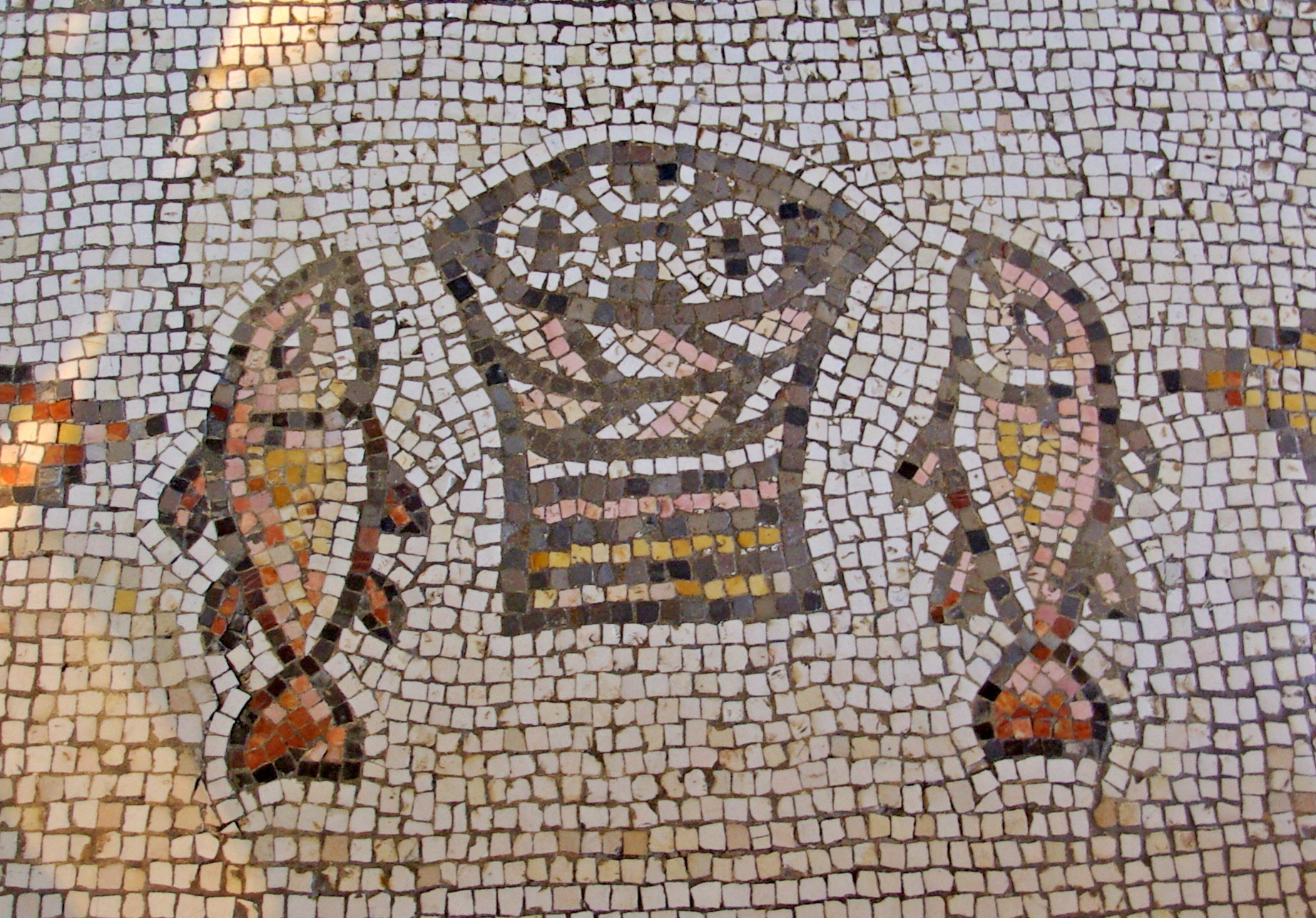
Mosaic in the church
