= Elisha Yered =

Israeli settler (b. 2001)

- אלישע ירד
- Born: 2001 (age 24–25); Ramat Gan, Israel
- Known for: Building Israeli outposts in the West Bank
- Movement: Hilltop youth

Elisha Yered (Hebrew: אלישע ירד) is a far-right Israeli settler and member of the Hilltop Youth. He builds illegal outposts in the West Bank, with the aim of bringing it under Israeli control. He has been sanctioned by the European Union, the United Kingdom, and several other countries for allegedly participating in violence against Palestinians.

== Biography ==
Yered was born in 2001 in Ramat Gan, Israel. His parents are from Petah Tikva, Israel, which Yered says his great-grandfather helped found. The family moved to Sa-Nur, an Israeli settlement in the West Bank, when Yered was a child. After that settlement was dismantled in 2005, they moved to Shalhevet-Ya, an outpost near the Yitzhar settlement and the Palestinian village of Asira al-Kabiliya. Under international law, all Israeli settlements in the West Bank are illegal, which Israel disputes. The Israeli government considers outposts built without its authorization to be illegal but has retroactively recognized some. Yered did not complete compulsory service in the Israel Defense Forces (IDF).

Since he was a teen, Yered has been involved in building Israeli outposts in the West Bank and has been monitored by the Shin Bet's department on Jewish extremism. At age 15, Israeli officials banned him from the West Bank for alleged violence against Palestinians. By 2021, Yered had become a well-known settler activist and spokesman for the Hilltop Youth, a group of extremist young men who build illegal outposts in the West Bank and have frequently been accused of violence against Palestinians. Yered has been instrumental in expanding Israeli settlements in the West Bank, setting up 5 outposts between 2021 and 2024, and has been involved in altercations with Palestinians. He has lived in various outposts, including Maoz Esther, Meginei Eretz, and Ramat Migron. Some of these outposts have been repeatedly dismantled by Israeli security forces, and Yered was arrested on one of these occasions. Yered is part of the Frontline Hills Administration, which provides money, infrastructure, construction, security, and other support to outposts. He is active on social media and is a columnist for the right-wing Olam Katan magazine.

In August 2022, Yered was detained for several days based on security footage that showed him stealing and damaging Palestinian property in Kisan. According to his lawyer, he was not aware that the property belonged to anyone. He was released to house arrest and was not indicted. After the 2022 election, Yered worked as the spokesman for Knesset member Limor Son Har-Melech, a politician in the far-right Otzma Yehudit party. The right-wing Channel 14 outlet included him on a list of "Young and Promising Israelis". He resigned from the spokesman position after several months because he felt the party was too moderate.

Yered was arrested in August 2023 for his suspected involvement in the killing of 19-year-old Palestinian Qusai Matan, including hiding the gun. Another settler, Yehiel Indore, was suspected of shooting Matan and was also arrested. Matan was killed during a clash between settlers and Palestinians in the Palestinian village of Burqa, Ramallah. The settlers said they came to Burqa to defend an Israeli shepherd who was under attack and that Indore fired his weapon after a Palestinian injured his head with a rock. Palestinians said that the settlers had instigated the conflict, herding their sheep to the village where they damaged property, threw stones, and shot at residents. Five Palestinians were also arrested. Har-Melech and Israeli minister Itamar Ben-Gvir spoke in support of Yered and Indore, with Ben-Gvir tweeting that "A Jew who defends himself and others against the murder of Palestinians is... a hero". The United States condemned the killing of Matan, calling it a "terror attack by Israeli extremist settlers".

Yedioth Ahronoth cited an Israeli security source saying that Yered had been "heating up the West Bank", leading Palestinians to increasingly resort to violence. Yered stated: "it is very easy to blame the victim and accuse us of inflaming tensions. Even if we do inflame, then yes, this is how we do it; the IDF just have to put up with it, it should go on the offensive against the Palestinian village." After the court determined there was not enough evidence to hold Yered, he was released to house arrest. He was not indicted for Matan's killing. In September 2023, IDF General Yehuda Fox prohibited Yered from entering the West Bank and communicating with five other settler activists for five months. The ban was condemned by Har-Melech and by Yered who said it was "revenge" for the failure of the case against him.

Benjamin Achimeir, a 14-year-old Israeli, went missing in the West Bank on 12 April 2024. Yered posted to a settler WhatsApp group urging them to take "collective punishment against the murderous Arab population" and listing several locations. Although it was the Sabbath, Yered referenced the Jewish principle of pikuach nefesh that allows for breaking religious rules if necessary to save a human life. His message and similar messages were circulated on WhatsApp. Settlers subsequently rampaged through 11 Palestinian villages, killing four Palestinians and thousands of animals, injuring others, and destroying property. According to Yered, almost a thousand Israelis participated in the attacks, many of whom were not Hilltop Youth. A Palestinian man was later arrested for killing Achimeir.

The EU sanctioned Yered and several other settlers in April 2024. The sanctions accused Yered of involvement in the August 2023 attack on Burqa and said he had engaged in "physical and psychosocial harassment, beatings, murder and demolition of property, against Palestinians … of a systematic nature". The sanctions ban Yered from entering the EU, freeze his assets, and prohibit others from providing resources to him. He was sanctioned by the United Kingdom, Canada, and Australia later that year and by Singapore in November 2025. Yered told the Associated Press that the sanctions would not deter him from expanding settlements.

== Personal life ==
Yered is married with 3 children. He reads the Bible and books by Avraham Kook, Yaakov Moshe Harlap, and Meir Kahane.

=== Views ===
Yered has been described as extremist, far-right, and ultranationalist. He believes that the West Bank belongs to Israel, that settlers are following their religious duty to claim the land, and that Palestinians should be expelled. One strategy he has advocated involves building a series of outposts in the West Bank to separate Palestinian land in the north from the south. There are 10 hills that he believes are the key to full Israeli control of the West Bank. Yered has described herding as a tactic to acquire land: first settlers graze livestock on Palestinian land, then the land is designated as an agricultural plot, then access roads are built, and finally residences are constructed.

Yered believes that violence against Palestinians can be justified and has defended price tag attacks as deterring Palestinian attacks on settlers. He has stated that the settlers intentionally provoke "friction" with Palestinians to pressure them into responding with violence. According to Haaretz, the settlers attack Palestinians and then Israeli security forces arrest the Palestinians for attacking the settlers. Harassment from settlers and Israel security forces has led many Palestinians to abandon their land in the West Bank. Yered has celebrated their departure, tweeting: "There's nothing better than hearing again about more Arab encroachment outposts leaving the area." He told Channel 12 that the settlers are more effective than soldiers in expanding "Jewish control" over large areas of land.

During the 2023 Huwara attacks, Yered posted in support of destroying the town, including a tweet with the hashtag "#WipeoutHawara". Yered defended a viral video of Orthodox Jews spitting near a Christian religious procession in Jerusalem in October 2023, tweeting that spitting near Christians is an "ancient Jewish custom". His statement was denounced by Minister of Tourism Haim Katz.
