= April 2024 Israeli settler rampages =

Rioting in the West Bank

- Location: West Bank
- Caused by: Disappearance and death of Israeli teenager Benjamin Achimeir
- Methods: Widespread rioting; looting; assault; arson; protests; vandalism; shootouts

Parties
West Bank Palestinians	West Bank Israeli settlers	Israeli Defence Forces

Casualties and losses
At least 4 killed Dozens injured	Dozens injured	Three wounded

In April 2024, Israeli settlers rampaged through Palestinian villages in the West Bank after the disappearance of Israeli teenager Benjamin Achimeir on 12 April 2024, whose dead body was found a day later. In total, 11 Palestinian villages were attacked, four Palestinians were shot dead and thousands of locals' animals were killed, while a dozen homes and over 100 cars were burned. BBC News, citing messages from Israeli settlers' WhatsApp groups and testimony from Palestinian villagers and officials, described the rampage as appearing to be an "organised campaign of revenge … carried out by co-ordinated groups on the ground, and targeted against ordinary Palestinians with no apparent connection to the murder of Benjamin Achimeir other than the bad luck of living nearby."

== Background ==
Since 1967, the West Bank has been occupied by Israel; by 2024, Israel controlled around 60% of the West Bank, and around 700,000 Israelis had moved into the West Bank and East Jerusalem since 1967, many of whom wanted to keep these areas under Jewish control. Israeli settlements are considered illegal by the international community.

In late 2022, far-right leaders of the Israeli settlement movement were elected into the government of Israel and appointed as prominent ministers; in early 2023, Israeli settler violence increased, which included the Huwara rampage of February 2023. In October 2023, the outbreak of the Gaza war was accompanied by a further escalation in Israeli settler violence in the West Bank. After the war began, the settlers "have acted with near-impunity", wrote BBC News in May 2024.

=== Killing of Benjamin Achimeir ===
On 12 April 2024, 14-year-old Benjamin Achimeir (Hebrew: בנימין אחימאיר, romanized: Binyamin Achimair) was declared missing after he left a farm near the Israeli outpost of Malachei HaShalom to go shepherding in the West Bank, sparking a 24-hour search by Israeli authorities. The following day, his body was found by a drone near the area he went missing. His death was attributed to blunt trauma, but his body also had stab wounds, according to Israeli authorities.

Israeli authorities ruled the killing as a terrorist attack, attributing it to "one or more Palestinian terrorists". His disappearance sparked Israeli settler rampages in Palestinian villages in the West Bank that escalated after his body was found.

== Settler attacks ==
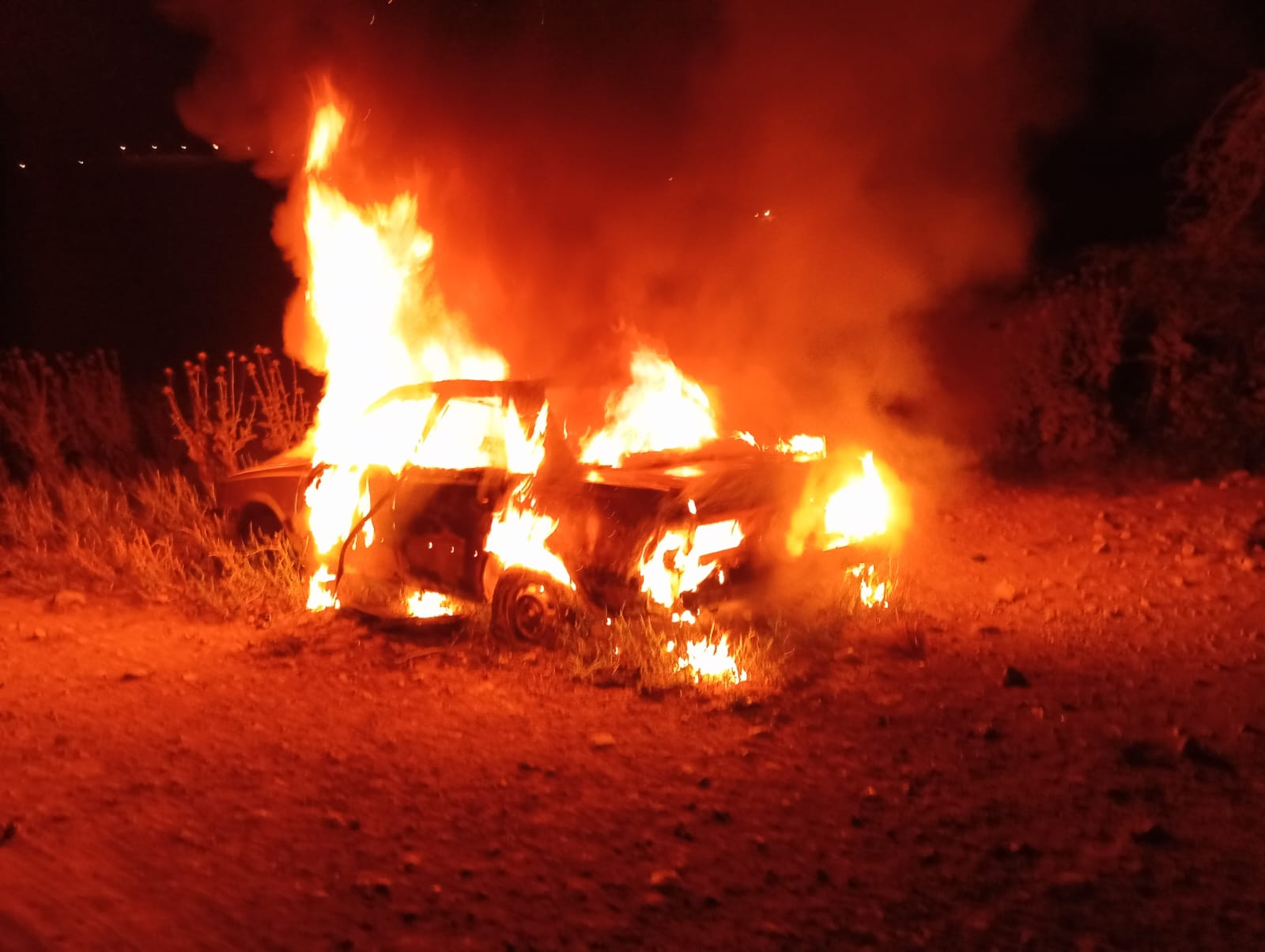
Palestinian car set on fire by Israeli settlers following the killing, Northern Jordan valley

Israeli settlers began their attacks on 12 April 2024, within hours of Benjamin Achimeir's disappearance. On the morning of 13 April 2024, with Benjamin Achimeir still missing, extremist settler Elisha Yered (a suspect for murder of a Palestinian man) sent a message to a WhatsApp group for Israeli settlers, stating: "the obvious measures have not been taken", and calling for "collective punishment against the murderous Arab population", including "home to home searches" and "crowning" of nearby Palestinian villages to close their entrances and exits, while naming several locations to meet up. This message was then spread among other WhatsApp groups for settlers. Within hours, the settler WhatsApp groups spread a similar message, adding fire emojis. In the groups, individual settlers made demands to "eliminate the enemy" and "exterminate the beasts".

After this, the Israeli settlers rampaged through Palestinian villages up to 7 kilometers from Benjamin Achimeir's home, and these rampages escalated following the discovery of Achimeir's body. In response, the IDF deployed extra troops and Border Police to the area. In total, 11 Palestinian villages were attacked, four people and thousands of animals were killed, while a dozen homes and over 100 cars were burned. BBC News wrote that the settlers' WhatsApp messages and the testimony of Palestinian officials and affected families "paint a picture of an organised campaign of revenge that was incited in part using WhatsApp, carried out by co-ordinated groups on the ground, and targeted against ordinary Palestinians with no apparent connection to the murder of Benjamin Achimeir other than the bad luck of living nearby."

Despite the religious law Sabbath prohibiting the WhatsApp messages on that day, Elisha Yered and Eitan Rabinovich (founder of an organisation calling for West Bank Palestinians to be boycotted and refused employment) cited Pikuach Nefesh in claiming that Achimeir's disappearance was more important than any religious law. WhatsApp group "Investigating Fear of Kidnapping", comprising over 300 people, urged settlers to set up illegal checkpoints at Palestinian villages and to conduct illegal stops and searches of cars. By the night of 13 April 2024, one administrator of the "Investigating Fear of Kidnapping" group, David Zvi-Atia, called on all members of the group to "erase their messages then get out of this group and hide it in your settings … then get out of this group and hide it in your settings." When BBC News approached Yered, Rabinovich and Zvi-Atia for comment, each of them accused BBC News of antisemitism.

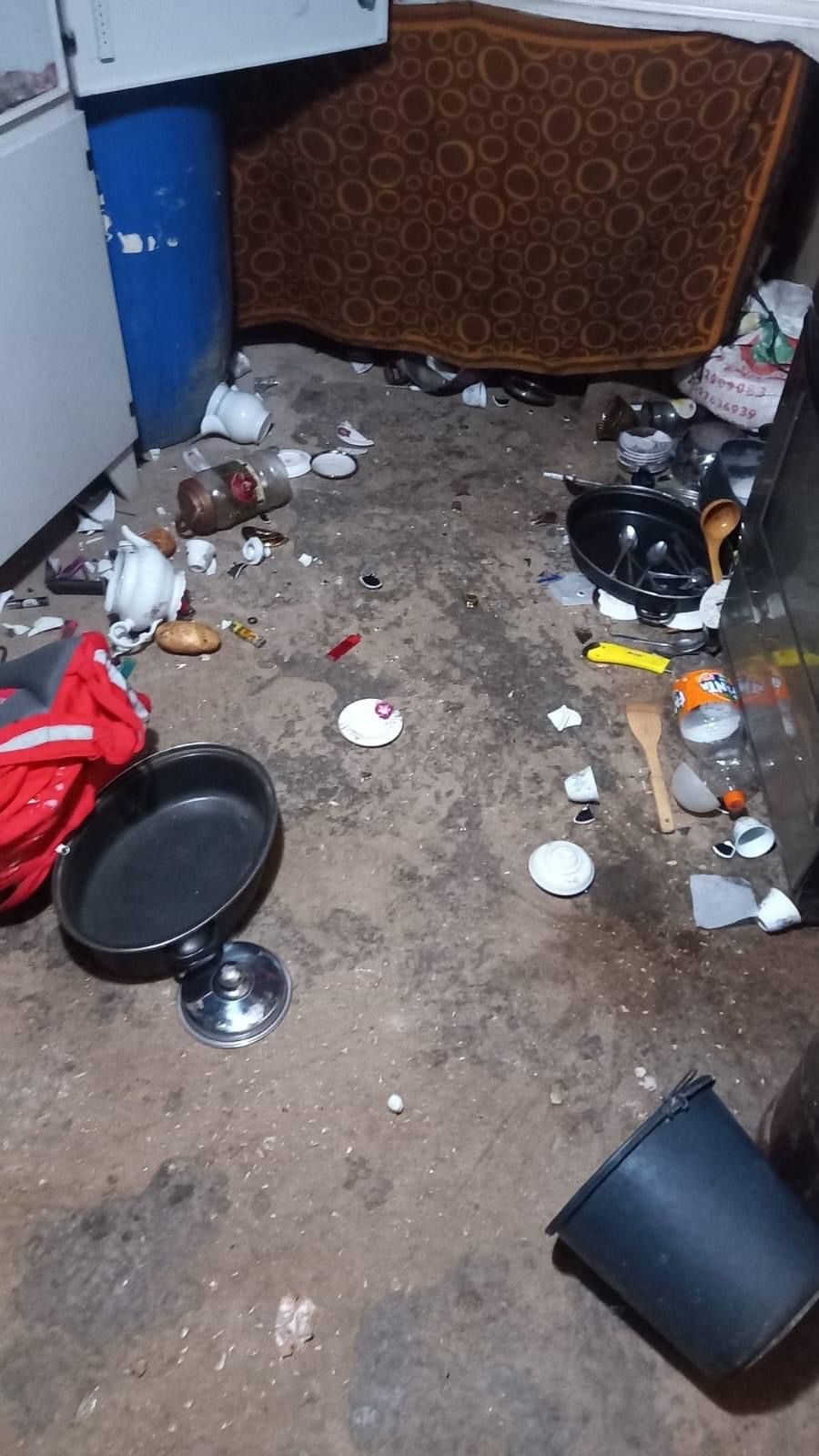
House in Ein al-Hilweh village in Jordan valley following Israeli settlers attack, 13 April 2024

=== Al-Mughayyir ===
Aftermath of Israeli settler attack on al-Mughayyir. April 2024

On 12 April, during midday, hundreds of Israeli settlers armed with firearms and stones stormed the village of al-Mughayyir, Ramallah, around 500 metres (1,600 ft) west of the settlement Achimair was last seen. The settlers were participating in the search for the boy. The head of the village council, Amin Abu Alia, estimated that around 1,000 to 1,200 settlers encircled the village, and around 500 entered. The settlers initially blocked the roads in the area, but then began to attack it, raiding homes and starting fires. Shots were also fired at residents, resulting in clashes. A video showed houses and vehicles in the village on fire. Around 25 people were injured in the attack, and 26-year-old Jehad Abu Alia was killed. It is unclear if his death was caused by settlers or Israeli soldiers.

At least eight of the wounded were struck by gunfire. 70 sheep were also reportedly stolen. At around 3:00 pm, the IDF arrived at the scene. According to Abu Alia, the soldiers did not act to prevent the attacks, and instead allowed settlers to raid homes while preventing Palestinians from moving around and blocking ambulances from reaching the injured. The Palestinian Red Crescent said 11 ambulances were dispatched, and several people were wounded by bullet fragments. According to the IDF, security forces were sent to disperse the riots, and rocks were thrown at soldiers, who then responded with live fire. It added that soldiers worked alongside Israel Border Police to remove Israeli settlers who entered the village.

Settlers attack on a sheep pen in Al-Mughayyir

The following day, dozens of settlers returned to the village, setting 12 houses and several cars ablaze. The Palestinian Health Ministry reported that three people were injured, one critically. Israeli forces used tear gas and rubber bullets against villagers who gathered, in an attempt to disperse them. The Palestinian Civil Emergency Service said that settlers opened fire at its workers and set one of their cars ablaze.

In the settler WhatsApp group "Investigating Fear of Kidnapping", when settlers set fire to a garage and another family's home, one group member "Iti'el" messaged: "We need as many adults with vehicles as possible to come out to the road by al-Mughayyir to pick up people running towards the road … There are a bunch of police chasing them. Is the route to Shilo open?"

=== Abu Falah ===
On 13 April, at least five Palestinians were reportedly wounded after an Israeli settler attack on the village of Abu Falah, close to Ramallah.

=== Beitin ===
In Beitin, a village near Ramallah, the Palestinian Health Ministry said that 17-year-old Omar Hameed died from his wounds hours after being shot by settlers. The Palestinian Red Crescent said that at least 20 others were wounded, and a photographer for the Israeli newspaper, Yedioth Ahronoth, was also assaulted by settlers, some of whom were wearing military costumes.

=== Duma ===
At least four Palestinians were wounded when Israeli settlers raided the village of Duma. During the raid, several houses and at least 40 cars were set ablaze. Shaul Golan, an Israeli photographer and journalist for Ynet, was beaten by settlers while covering the attack. He suffered a broken hand and his equipment was destroyed. Some of the settlers were masked, while others wore military uniforms. In an interview, Golan said that he begged who he thought were soldiers to help him, but then realized that they were not soldiers and were working with the settlers.

The head of the Duma village council, Suleiman Dawabsha, told reporters that around 300 Israeli soldiers stormed the village along with hundreds of settlers. The IDF did not make a statement regarding the claim. A resident of the village whose home was set on fire said that soldiers were present but did not stop the attack. The attack mirrored a similar incident in 2015, when an extremist settler set a house ablaze in the village, killing three and injuring one.

Duma Junction was one of the places identified by settlers to meet at while urging "collective punishment of the murderous Arab population"; within hours the settlers attacked and burned at least one home. By the afternoon of 13 April 2024, the settlers' WhatsApp group "Investigating Fears of Kidnapping" showed messages that Duma was "full of security forces … We were chased by soldiers. What's the plan? Where should we go? Let us know", while another message identified a location to meet at. Tali Dahan, who had claimed online to work for the Israeli police, questioned in the group why settlers were being arrested in Duma, with Dahan proclaiming: "Let all of Duma burn … Make them afraid, those beasts. Exterminate them."

Haaretz staff went to Duma on 13 April 2024, describing that "as the riots were still going on, a number of [Israeli] settlers could be seen leaving the village toward the main road where soldiers and Border Police officers were stationed. The settlers then got in their cars and drove off. No law enforcement officer present tried to detain or ask them if they'd been involved in the riots."

=== Aqraba ===
According to Salah Bani Jaber, the mayor of Aqraba, Nablus, around 50 settlers attacked the town, many of them armed. The settlers assaulted and fired shots at residents, leading to two deaths. Jaber told Reuters that Israeli soldiers were present at the scene, but did not intervene and instead stood by and watched the attack. According to the Palestinian Red Crescent, the soldiers blocked ambulances from reaching the wounded. According to the IDF, soldiers were dispatched to the area and intervened to halt the clashes.

=== Deir Dibwan ===
CCTV footage showed that in the Palestinian village of Deir Dibwan, a masked Israeli settler entered a garage and set a parked car on fire, while at least three Israeli soldiers, who were guarding the settlers, watched and made no attempt to stop him.

=== As-Sawiya ===
Israeli settlers arrived at the town of As-Sawiya, close to the Israeli settlement of Eli, and began to throw stones at the Palestinian residents, who did the same in retaliation. IDF soldiers arrived at the scene shortly after the clashes broke out and opened fire at rioters. Haaretz reported that the soldiers only arrived after the settlers were chased out of the town by a group of residents, and that the settlers were standing on a hill alongside the soldiers around 500 metres (1,600 ft) away before they opened fire.

A volunteer ambulance driver for the Palestinian Red Crescent Society was fatally shot by Israeli settlers while transporting injured Palestinians, according to the Palestinian Ministry of Health. Some Hebrew-language reports said that he was shot by Israeli armed forces. The IDF confirmed that an ambulance driver was killed and said that it was investigating the incident.

== Reactions ==
=== Israel ===
Israel arrested five people suspected in being involved in the 2024 attacks.

The settler attacks in the West Bank were criticized by Israeli opposition leader Yair Lapid, who called them violent riots and urged Israel to intervene to prevent further violence.

Israeli Defense Minister Yoav Gallant warned against revenge attacks in the West Bank, saying that they would make it more difficult for Israeli forces in their mission.

Dahlia Scheindlin of Haaretz in April 2024 contrasted the Israeli reaction to the Huwara rampage in February 2023 to the Israeli reaction to the April 2024 settler attacks - in the earlier event: "Many Israelis immediately labeled the Hawara events a pogrom ... they were still shocked by the collective vengeance and mob violence ... There was reckoning, conversation and some condemnation from a few political leaders", but in the later event, "in the days since Ahimeir's killing and the vigilante terror on Palestinian villages, the events have hardly registered in the [Israeli] public discourse .... all of it seems like background noise. On the Israeli side, is Israeli mob and vigilante violence, extrajudicial killing or sheer terrorism becoming routine and forgettable?"

=== Palestine ===
Palestinian prime minister Mohammad Mustafa condemned the attack on al-Mughayyir and urged authorities to assist the people of the village. He later issued a statement condemning the other attacks in the West Bank, and said that they would not discourage the Palestinian people from standing on their land.

Hamas issued a statement urging Palestinians to fight against "settler militias" on the day Achimeir's body was found.

Suleiman Dawabsha, the mayor of the village of Dufa, told AFP that the West Bank "has been in a state of war" since the day Achimeir disappeared.

=== International ===
The United States Department of State condemned the rising violence in the West Bank and encouraged Israel and the Palestinian Authority to de-escalate the situation. Spokesperson Matthew Miller said in a statement that "civilians are never legitimate targets" and called on authorities to protect all communities from harm.

The United Nations Human Rights Office released a statement calling on Israel to take immediate and concrete steps to end the escalating violence in the West Bank. United Nations Special Rapporteur on the occupied Palestinian territories Francesca Albanese urged the UN to deploy a "protective presence" in the area to prevent and repel attacks against civilians, saying that the IDF had proven that it is unable to do so.

The Arab League denounced the settler attacks, which it said were often perpetrated under Israeli approval and protection. It added that the attacks are "exacerbating a pervasive state of impunity and continued oppression of Palestinian lives and properties".

The Foreign Ministry of the United Kingdom said it was alarmed by the increase in violence in the West Bank and said that it was causing an increase of violence in the wider region as well. It also urged Israeli authorities to conduct investigations into all of the deaths.

The Belgian Ministry of Foreign Affairs condemned the rising settler violence, saying that attacks on civilians should cease and their perpetrators should be brought to justice. It also condemned Israeli settlements, which it described as illegal and an obstacle to peace.

== See also ==
- Huwara pogrom
- Far-right politics in Israel
- Assassination of Rehavam Ze'evi
