= Settler violence =

Settler violence may refer to:

- Israeli settler violence
- Settler violence in French Algeria (1830–1962)
