= Malachei HaShalom =

Settlement in the West Bank

Malachei HaShalom מלאכי השלום
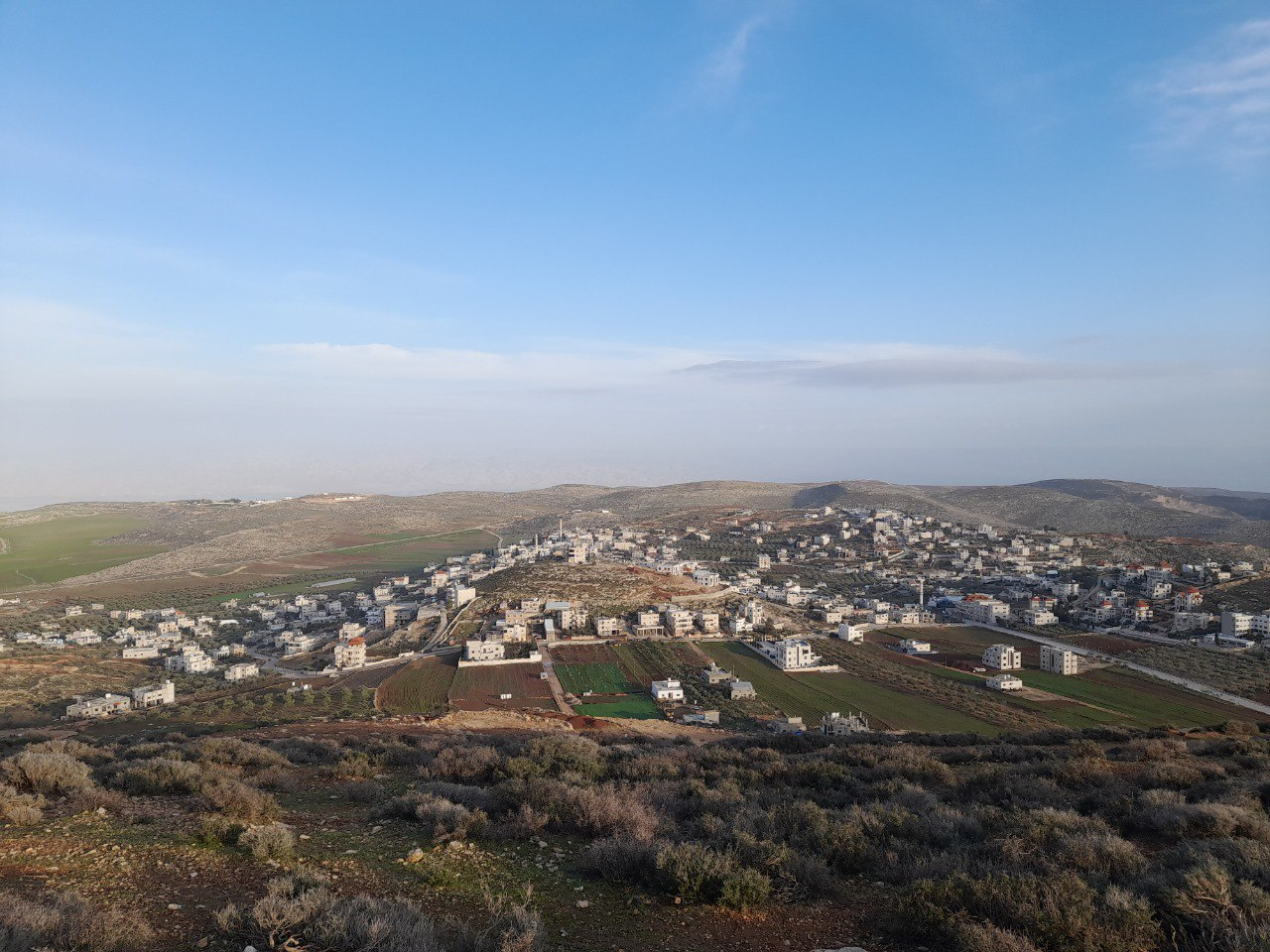
- Interactive map of Malachei HaShalom

Malachei HaShalom (Hebrew: מלאכי השלום, lit. 'Angels of Peace') is an Israeli settlement in the northern West Bank. Located near the settlement of Kochav HaShahar, it was established in 2015 following the murder of Malachi Rosenfeld in a shooting attack. The town is located on Route 458.

Originally founded as an unauthorized outpost, the community was officially recognized and legalized by the Israeli cabinet in February 2023. Palestinians are not permitted to enter the community. Like all Israeli settlements in the West Bank, it is considered illegal under international law, though Israel disputes this.

== History ==
The outpost was established in 2015. For several years, it operated without official government authorization. Throughout the town's existence, several farms were set up in nearby areas by settlers of the community. In February 2023, the Israeli security cabinet voted to officially recognize and legalize Malachei HaShalom alongside eight other West Bank outposts. Later, in 2024, the Israeli government declared approximately 750 dunams (185 acres) of land in the outpost's area as state land, expanding the territory designated for the community.

== Etymology ==
The community is named in memory of two Israeli victims of Palestinian shooting attacks: Malachi Rosenfeld from Kochav HaShahar, who was killed on the Alon Road in 2015, and Shalom (Shuli) HarMelech, who was killed in 2003. The combined name also references the phrase "Malachei HaShalom" (Angels of Peace) from the traditional Jewish Shabbat piyyut "Shalom Aleichem".

== Security incidents ==
Residents of Malachei HaShalom harassed the Palestinian Bedouin village of Ein Rashash for several years until the Bedouins left in October 2023.

In April 2024, a 14-year-old Israeli shepherd from the outpost, Benjamin Achimeir, was killed while tending sheep nearby. His disappearance and the subsequent discovery of his body triggered settler rampages in 11 villages across the West Bank. A Palestinian was arrested for his killing.

In August 2025, another shooting attack occurred near the outpost, targeting Israeli shepherds. A 20-year-old Israeli man was wounded in the incident, and the Israel Defense Forces subsequently set up checkpoints and search operations in the nearby Palestinian village of Al-Mughayyir.

== See also ==
- Khirbet Jib'it – adjacent archaeological site
