= Killing of Benjamin Achimeir =

Suspected murder of an Israeli teenager in the West Bank

- Part of the Israeli–Palestinian conflict
- Location of Malachei HaShalom
- Location: 32°01′36″N 35°22′02″E; Malachei HaShalom, Israeli-occupied West Bank
- Date: 12 April 2024 c. 6:30 am (UTC+3)
- Attack type: Stabbing, blunt trauma
- Victim: Benjamin Achimeir
- Perpetrator: See suspect

On 12 April 2024, 14-year-old Benjamin Achimeir (Hebrew: בנימין אחימאיר, romanized: Binyamin Achimair) was declared missing after he left a farm near the Israeli outpost of Malachei HaShalom to go shepherding in the West Bank, sparking a 24-hour search by Israeli authorities. The following day, his body was found by a drone near the area he went missing. His death was attributed to blunt trauma, but his body also had stab wounds, according to Israeli authorities.

Israeli authorities ruled the killing as a terrorist attack, attributing it to "one or more Palestinian terrorists". His disappearance sparked Israeli settler rampages in Palestinian villages in the West Bank that escalated after his body was found.

== Background ==
At least 160 Israeli settlements have been built in the West Bank, housing over 700,000 Jews. They have been declared illegal by the international community, but the claim is disputed by Israel. The West Bank has been occupied by Israel since the Six-Day War in 1967. The territory saw a surge of violence since the beginning of 2023, which escalated following the outbreak of the Gaza war.

== Disappearance and discovery of body ==
At around 6:30 am (03:30 GMT), Achimeir left the Gal Yosef farm near the outpost of Malachei HaShalom and around 2 kilometres (1.2 mi) from the village of al-Mughayyir, to go shepherding. His sheep returned to the farm without him, which is when he was declared missing. His sister, Hannah, told Agence France-Presse that he was familiar with the area and often herded sheep there. The Israeli military (IDF) was initially unsure whether or not it was terrorism-related.

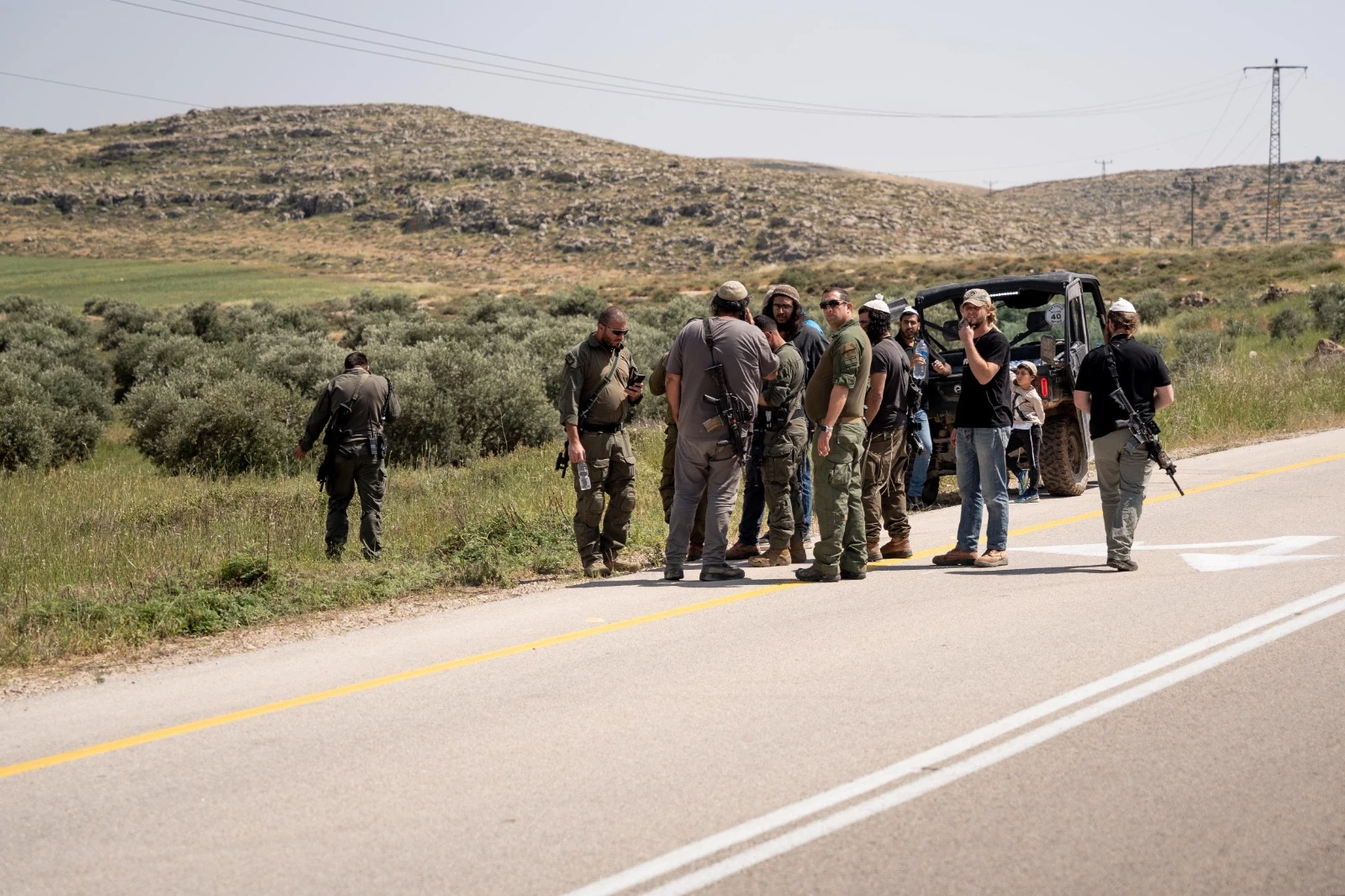
Israeli soldiers search for Benjamin Achimeir, 12 April 2024.

The incident sparked a massive search, during which Israeli ground, air, police, and special forces scanned the area and blocked roads. Thousands of volunteers from across the country joined to search for Achimeir. The chief of the IDF Central Command, Yehuda Fox, the head of its West Bank division, Yaakov Dolf, and Binyamin Brigade commander Liron Bitton went to the scene and led the search, according to the IDF. People with information regarding Achimair's disappearance were asked to call the Israel Police hotline or the Binyamin Police Station.

On 13 April, Achimeir's body was found in the same region he went missing by a drone operated by the 636th Combat Intelligence Collection unit of the Border Defense Corps after a 24-hour search. His personal belongings and clothes were scattered around the area of the body, and were handed over to police. His death was ruled as a terrorist attack by Israeli authorities. His body was found during an escalation of violence in the territory, where tensions have already been high.

A funeral for Achimeir was held on 14 April in the Givat Shaul neighborhood of Jerusalem, the city where he is from. Hundreds of people attended, including David Lau, Yitzhak Yosef, and Zvi Sukkot.

== Investigation ==
Due to the possible motive of the murder, the Shin Bet took the lead in the investigation, and the organization, along with the IDF and Israel Police, were ordered by Netanyahu to conduct operations in Palestinian towns near the area of the disappearance. In a joint statement, the IDF, Shin Bet, and Israel police estimated that Achimeir was killed by blunt force. Achimeir's body was found with marks that resembled a stabbing attack, but the IDF did not publish specific details about the death. The killing attributed was to "one or more Palestinian terrorists".

Israel Police and IDF civil administration confiscated equipment in the Gal Yosef farm, including water hoses used to dispense drinking water for the farmers and livestock. The seizure was condemned by National Defense Minister Itamar Ben-Gvir since it occurred within the week Achimeir died. Ben-Gvir called it "terrible callousness, moral confusion, a security folly, and disrespect for the dead." He added that destroying the farm instead of constructing further farms and expanding the settlement would be "surrendering to the enemy". An Israeli defense official confirmed that there was no intention to demolish the farm.

=== Suspect ===
On 22 April, Israeli authorities announced the overnight arrest of Ahmed Dawabsha, a 21-year-old Palestinian man from Duma who had "linked himself to the attack" during an interrogation. The arrest took place in the suspect's hometown. On 23 May, security footage was released showing the suspect, armed with a knife, searching for more victims at the farm's entrance.

On 20 June, IDF attorneys filed an indictment against the suspect which stated that he planned to murder Jews since 2023 with a terror cell that supported the Islamic State. It then described the murder: On 12 April, at 05:30, the suspect prayed and took a 20 centimetres (7.9 in)-long knife before leaving his home and approaching the Gal Yosef farm, where he spotted Achimeir. The suspect hid in the grass but was noticed by Achimeir. Achimeir attempted to run away but was chased by the suspect, who shouted "I will kill you". Achimeir then fell and was caught by the suspect, who murdered him after a struggle. The suspect then went back to the farm in search of more victims but was chased off by a dog and went back to his village, burning his clothes to cover his tracks.

== Resulting settler violence ==
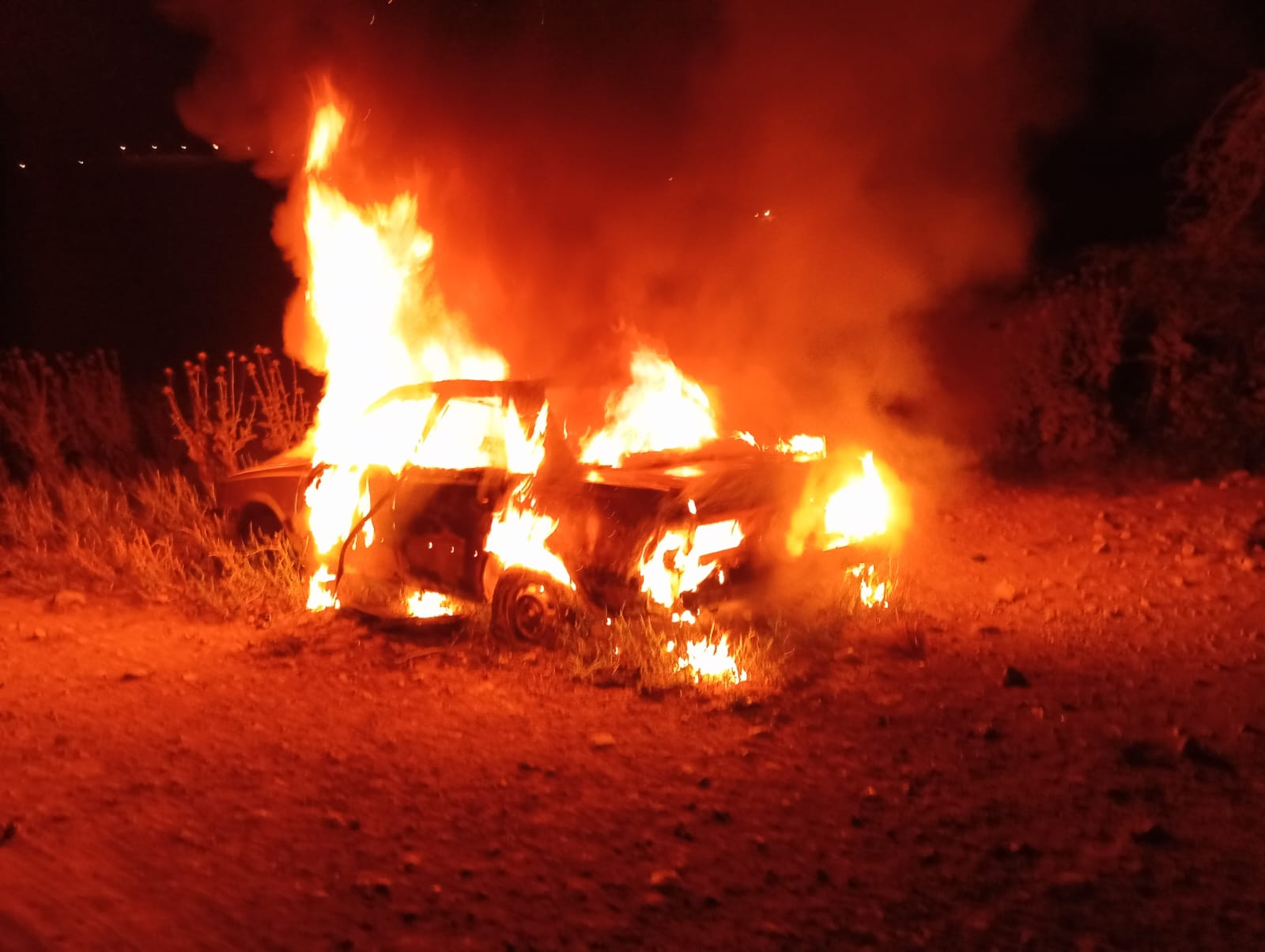
Palestinian car set on fire by Israeli settlers following the killing, Northern Jordan valley

Following Achimeir's disappearance, Israeli settler attacks took place in nearby Palestinian villages, which escalated following the discovery of his body. In response, the IDF deployed extra troops and Border Police to the area. In total, 11 Palestinian villages were attacked, four Palestinians (20-year-old Jihad Abu Aliya, 17-year-old Yaqoub Nasan, 30-year-old Abdul Rahman Bani Fadel and 21-year-old Mohammad Bani Jamea) were shot dead and thousands of animals were killed, while a dozen homes and over 100 cars were burned. BBC News, citing messages from Israeli settlers' WhatsApp groups and testimony from Palestinian villagers and officials, described the rampage as appearing to be an "organised campaign of revenge … carried out by co-ordinated groups on the ground, and targeted against ordinary Palestinians with no apparent connection to the murder of Benjamin Achimeir other than the bad luck of living nearby."

== Reactions ==
Israeli Prime Minister Benjamin Netanyahu vowed that the assailants would be found and told Israelis to not get in the way of security forces. He also called the incident a heinous murder and a serious crime, and sent condolences to Achimeir's family and vowed to capture his murderers. The murder was also condemned by the United States Department of State, who expressed sympathy towards Achimeir's friends and family, the United Kingdom, and Belgium.

== See also ==
- 2014 Gush Etzion kidnapping and murder
- 2023 Huwara shooting
- List of solved missing person cases (2020s)
- Palestinian political violence
