= Israeli settler violence =

Attacks targeting Palestinians in the West Bank

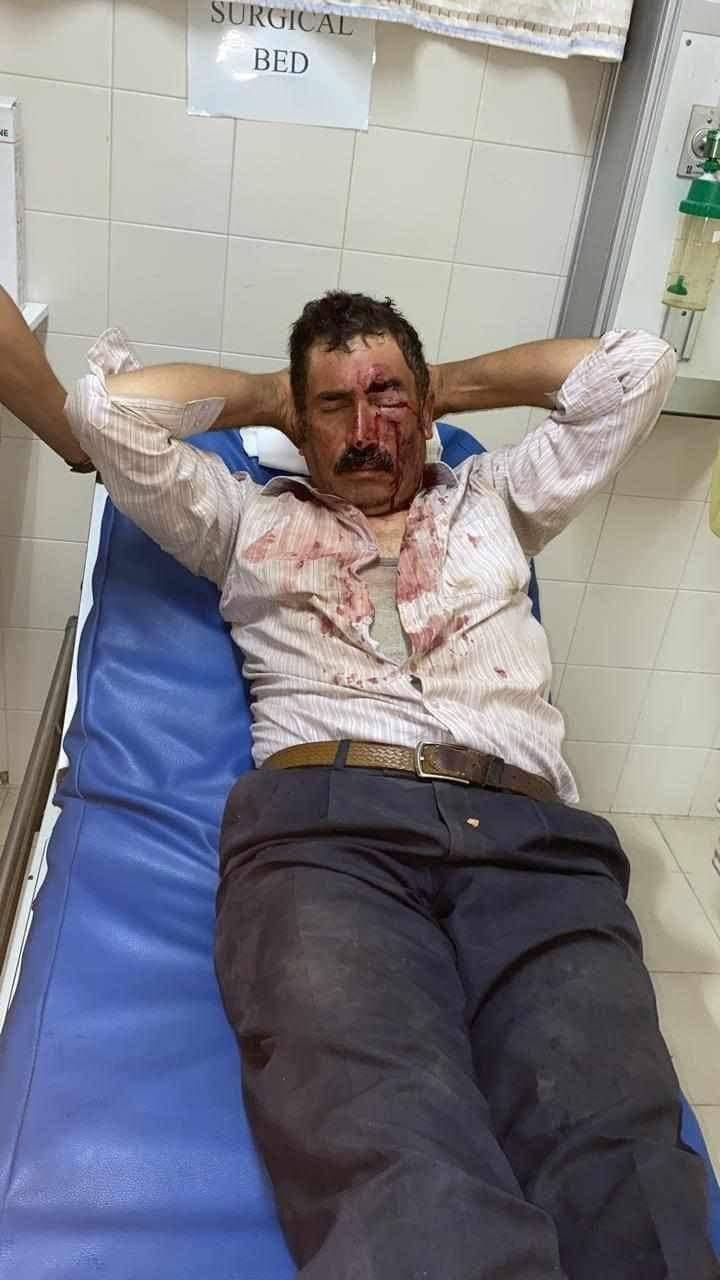
Victim of the July 2023 lynching at Uyun Kafr Qari', Qalqiliya Governorate

Israeli settlers have carried out acts of violence, intimidation, property damage, and other reported attacks mainly in the West Bank against Palestinians. Israeli settler violence has been documented since at least the late 20th century and includes incidents such as physical assaults, arson, vandalism, sexual violence, and shootings. Human rights and international organisations describe the system of control in the occupied territories as amounting to Israeli apartheid and report systematic violence in this context. Multiple reports have also described cases in which Israeli security forces were either accompanying or reportedly supporting the attackers, raising concerns over enforcement and accountability.

In November 2021, Israeli Defense Minister Benny Gantz discussed the steep rise in the number of incidents between settlers and Palestinians in the West Bank, many of which result from attacks by residents of illegal settler outposts on Palestinians from neighboring villages. Settler violence also includes acts known as price tag attacks that are in response to actions by the Israeli government, usually against Palestinian targets and occasionally against Israeli security forces in the West Bank.

Palestinian police are forbidden from reacting to acts of violence by Israeli settlers, a fact which diminishes their credibility among Palestinians. Between January and November 2008, 515 criminal suits were opened by Israel against settlers for violence against Arabs or Israeli security forces; 502 of these involved "right wing radicals" while 13 involved "left wing anarchists". In 2008, the senior Israeli commander in the West Bank said that a hard core of a few hundred activists were involved in violence against the Palestinians and Israeli soldiers. Some prominent Jewish religious figures living in the occupied territories, and also Israeli government officials, have condemned and expressed outrage over such behavior, while religious justifications for settler killings have also been given. Israeli media said the defense establishment began taking a harder line against unruly settlers starting in 2008. In 2011 the BBC reported that "vast majority of settlers are non-violent but some within the Israeli government acknowledge a growing problem with extremists." UN figures from 2011 showed that 90% of complaints filed against settlers by Palestinians with the Israeli police never led to indictment.

In the 21st century, there has been a steady increase in violence and terror perpetrated by Israeli settlers against Palestinians. In 2012, an EU heads of mission report found that settler violence had more than tripled in the three years up to 2011. United Nations Office for the Coordination of Humanitarian Affairs (OCHA) figures state that the annual rate of settler attacks (2,100 attacks in 8 years) has almost quadrupled between 2006 and 2014. In 2021, there was yet another wave of settler violence which erupted after a 16-year-old settler died in a car chase with Israeli police after having hurled rocks at Palestinians. So far it has resulted in 44 incidents in the span of a few weeks, injuring two Palestinian children. In the latter parts of 2021, there has been a marked increase in settler violence toward Palestinians, condemned at the United Nations Security Council.

This violence increased further following the election of a far-right government in 2022, which proposed to expand Israeli settlements in Palestinian territories, and the 2023 Hamas-led attack on Israel on 7 October 2023. From 7 October 2023 to 31 December 2024, there were 1,860 incidents of settler violence, resulting in the deaths of 870 civilians, including 177 children. Of the 150 investigations into settler violence opened in 2024, less than 10% resulted in indictment.

== History ==
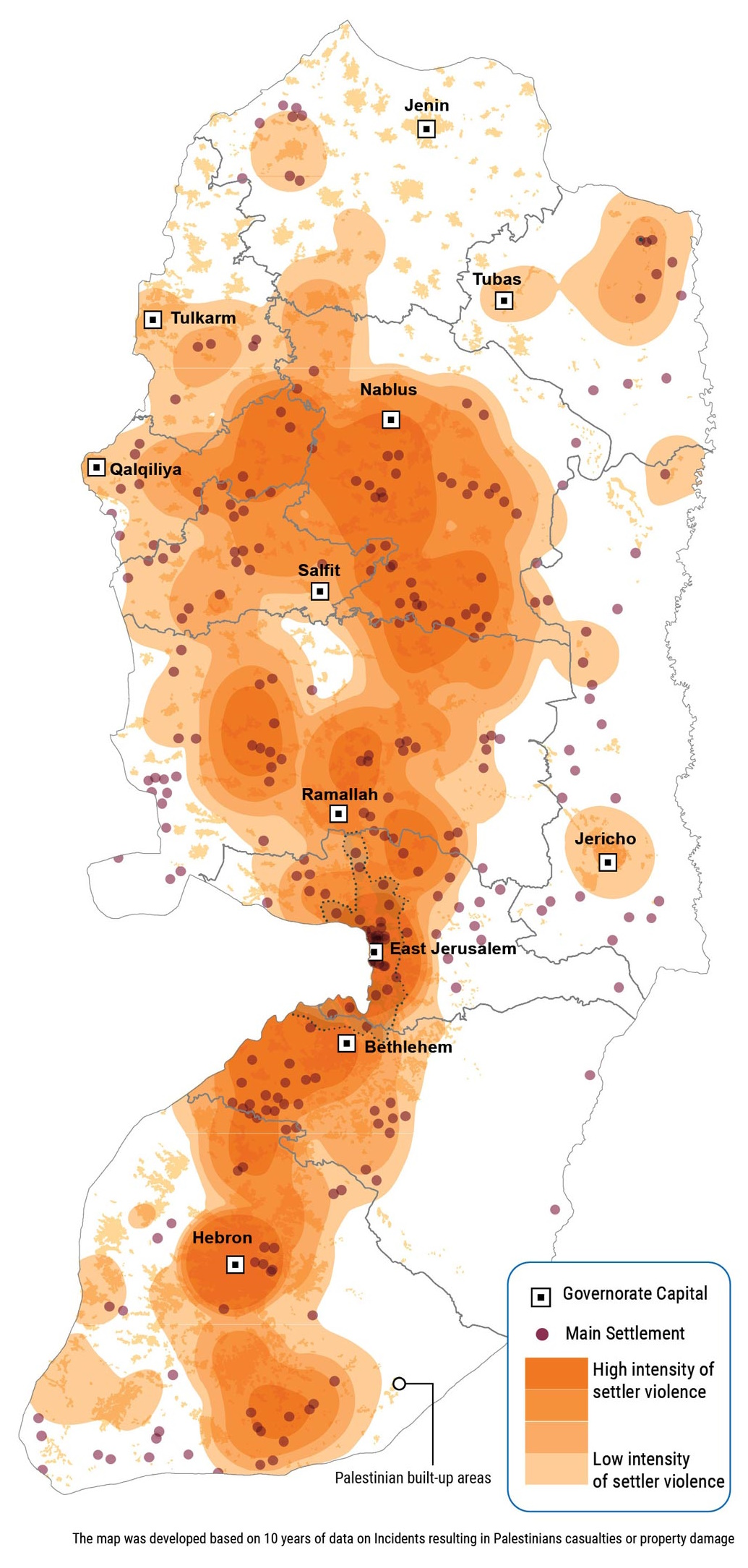
Settler-related violence in the West Bank, 2008–2018

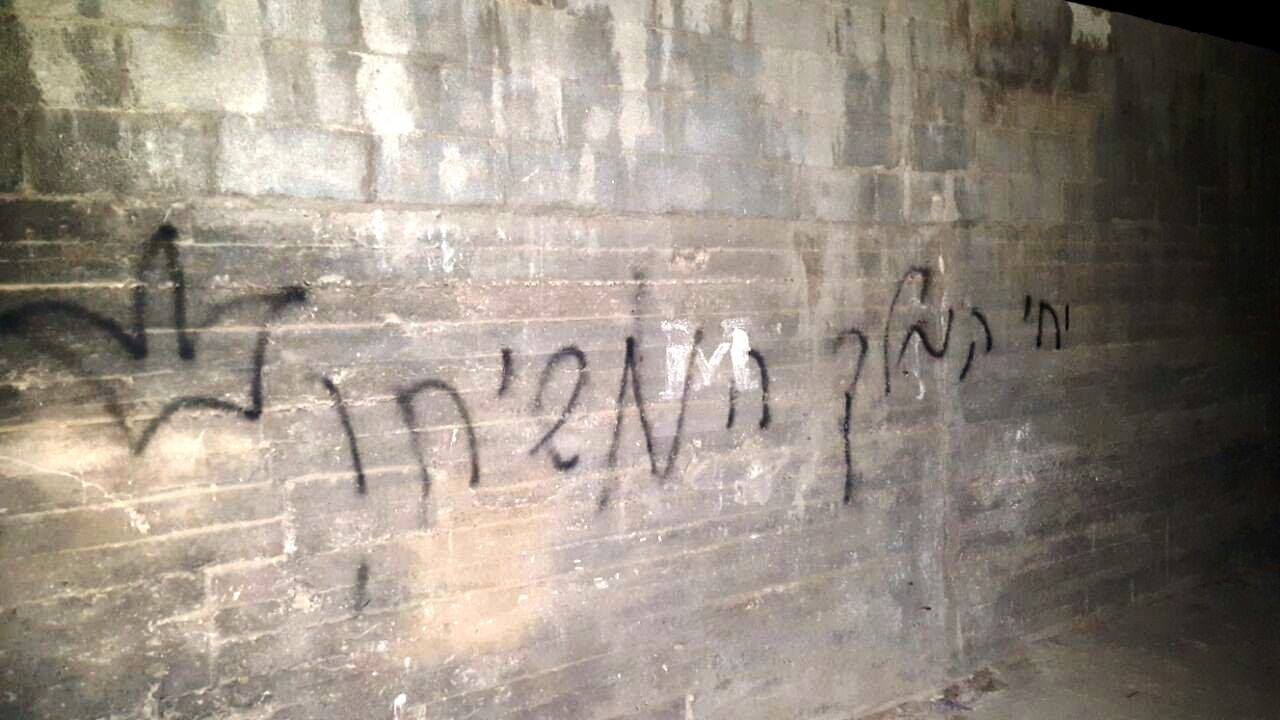
Hebrew graffiti reading; "Long live King Messiah" on the wall of the burnt Palestinian home targeted by Israeli settlers in the Duma arson attack, in which 3 Palestinians were murdered.

Physical violence by settlers against Palestinians in the West Bank started in a systematic manner in 1980, as some religious settlers created a secret organization later referred to as "the Jewish Underground". This group was captured by Israeli law enforcement authorities in 1984. Settler violence received a new boost following the Oslo agreement in 1993. In late 2022, far-right leaders of the Israeli settlement movement were elected into the government of Israel and appointed as prominent ministers; in early 2023, Israeli settler violence increased, which included the Huwara rampage of February 2023. In October 2023, the outbreak of the Gaza war was accompanied by a further escalation in Israeli settler violence in the West Bank. After the war began, the settlers "have acted with near-impunity", wrote BBC News in May 2024.

=== Israel's settlement policy ===
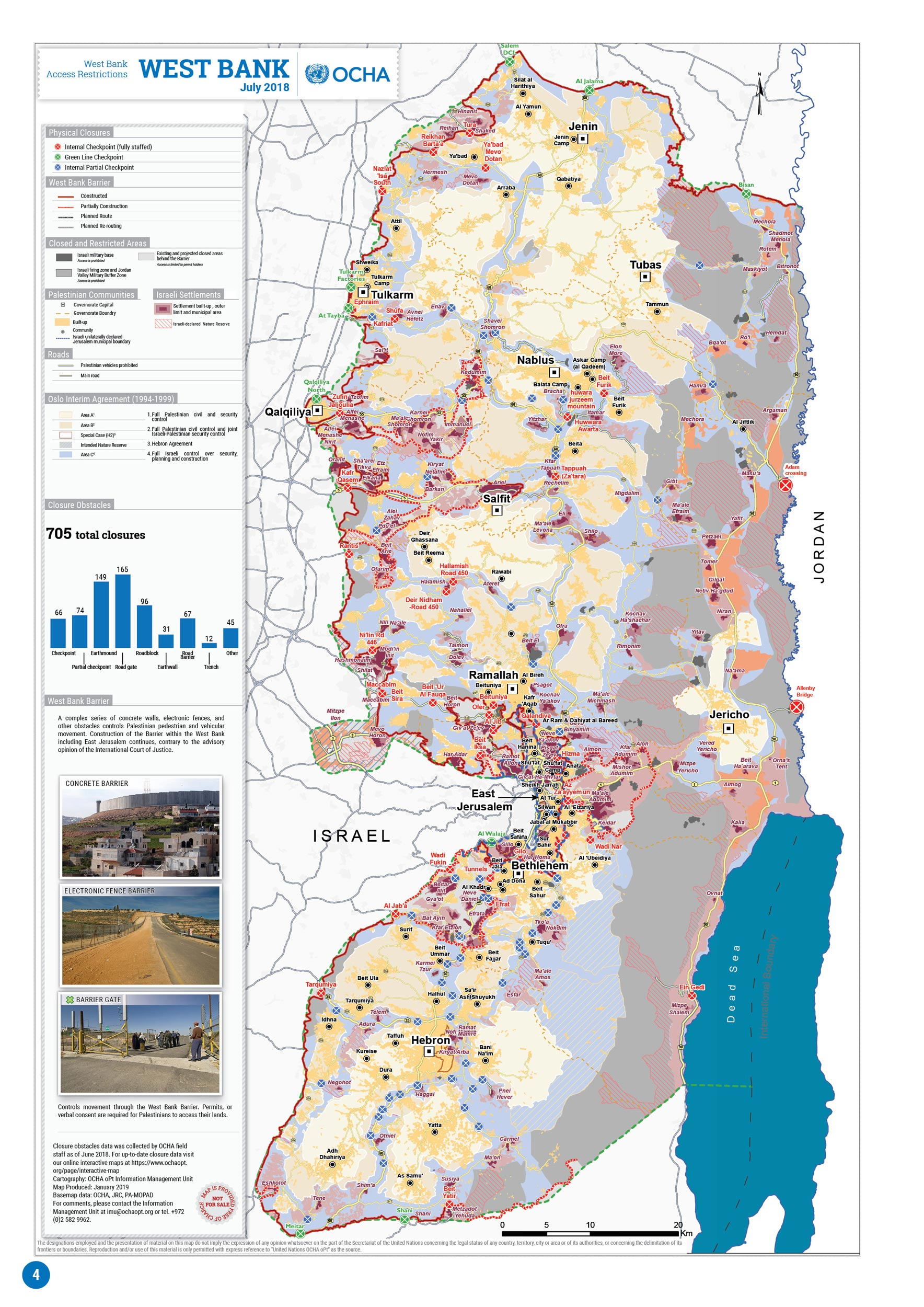
Settlements (darker pink) and areas of the West Bank (lighter pink) where access by Palestinians was closed or restricted at the time. Source: United Nations Office for the Coordination of Humanitarian Affairs, 2018.

Israel has justified its civilian settlements by stating the territories in question are not occupied, but disputed, and that a temporary use of land and buildings for various purposes appears permissible under a plea of military necessity and that the settlements fulfilled security needs. The United Nations affirmed the principle of international law that the continuation of colonialism in all its forms and manifestations is a crime and that colonial peoples have the inherent right to struggle by all necessary means at their disposal against colonial powers and alien domination in exercise of their right of self-determination. National liberation struggles are categorized as international armed conflicts by Article 1(4) of the Additional Protocol I to the Geneva Conventions of 12 August 1949 to which the majority of states (including the Western states) are parties. The International Court of Justice concluded that Israel had breached its obligations under international law by establishing settlements in the Occupied Palestinian Territory, including East Jerusalem, and that Israel cannot rely on a right of self-defence or on a state of necessity in order to preclude the wrongfulness of imposing a régime, which is contrary to international law. The Court also concluded that the Israeli régime violates the basic human rights of the Palestinians by impeding the liberty of movement of the inhabitants of the Occupied Palestinian Territory (with the exception of Israeli citizens) and their exercise of the right to work, to health, to education and to an adequate standard of living.

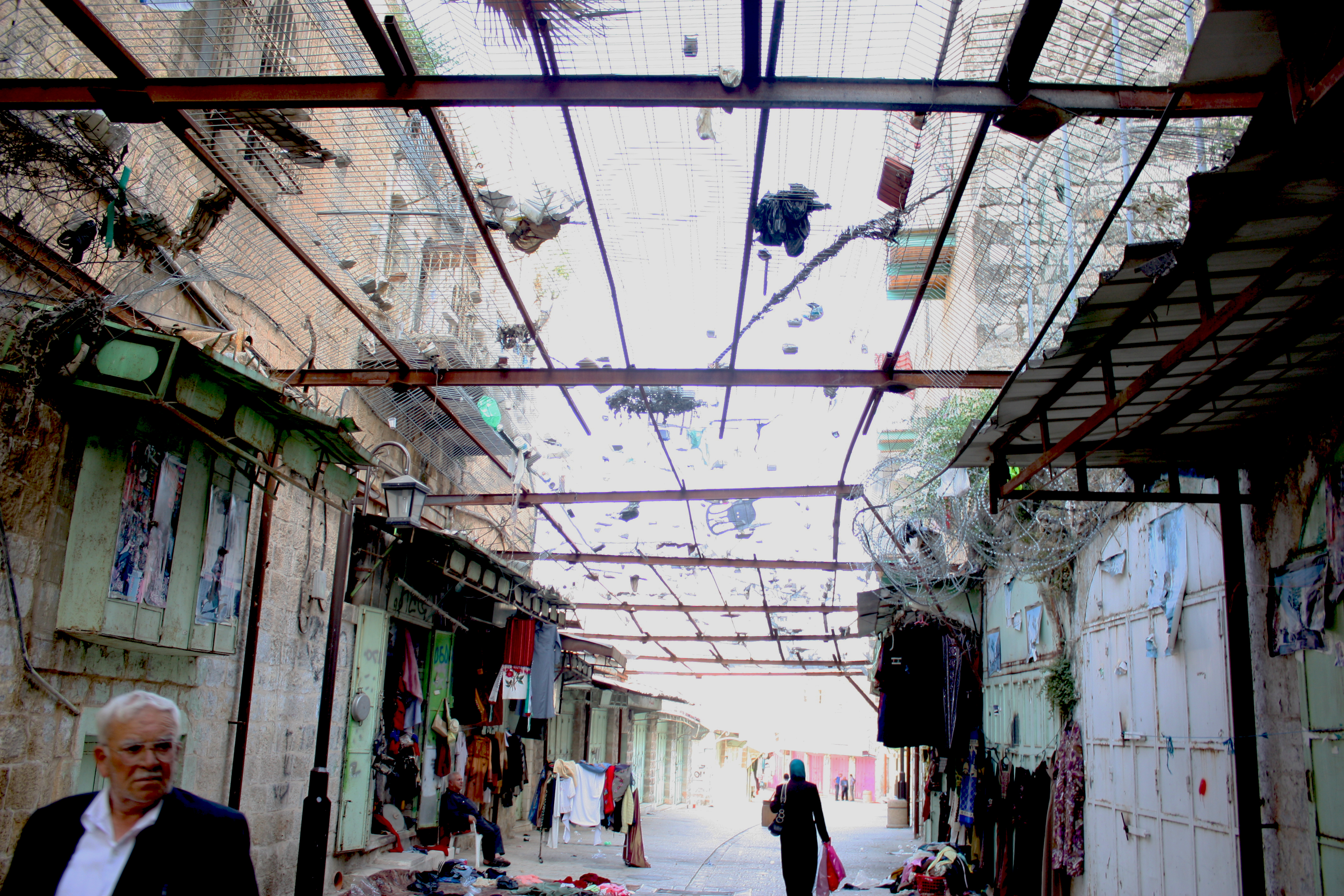
Net to protect Palestinians in Hebron from the garbage thrown by Israeli settlers on the upper floors, June 2010

In Hebron, where 500–600 settlers live among 167,000 Palestinians, B'Tselem argues that there have been "grave violations" of Palestinian human rights because of the "presence of the settlers within the city". The organization cites regular incidents of "almost daily physical violence and property damage by settlers in the city", curfews and restrictions of movement that are "among the harshest in the Occupied Territories", and violence by Israeli border policemen and the IDF against Palestinians who live in the city's H2 sector.

Human Rights Watch reports on physical violence against Palestinians by settlers, including, "frequent[ly] stoning and shooting at Palestinian cars. In many cases, settlers abuse Palestinians in front of Israeli soldiers or police with little interference from the authorities."

B'Tselem also says that settler actions include "blocking roadways, so as to impede Palestinian life and commerce. The settlers also shoot solar panels on roofs of buildings, torch automobiles, shatter windowpanes and windshields, destroy crops, uproot trees, abuse merchants and owners of stalls in the market. Some of these actions are intended to force Palestinians to leave their homes and farmland, and thereby enable the settlers to gain control of them."

=== Differing legal status and treatment of Israeli settlers and Palestinians ===
Unlike Palestinians, Israeli civilians living in the Palestinian Territories are not subject to military or local law, but are prosecuted according to Israeli civilian penal law. This originates in the Emergency Regulations bill enacted in 1967 and extended since which gives extraterritorial rights to Israelis in the occupied territories. B'Tselem has said that the difference in legal status of Israelis and Palestinians in the territories has led to a double standard in which Israelis are given more legal rights and are punished more lightly than the Palestinians who are subject to military and local law. B'Tselem notes the system violates the principles of equality before the law and territoriality.

Referring to settler violence during the police evacuation of the "Federman Farm" near Kiryat Arba, Haaretz has stated in an editorial "Israeli society has become accustomed to giving lawbreaking settlers special treatment", noting that no other group could similarly attack Israeli law enforcement agencies without being severely punished. Haaretz has characterized settler violence on soldiers and policemen who participated in the evacuation of the "Federman Farm" as "terrorism".

In response to the violence directed towards Israeli security forces, Israel declared it would no longer fund any illegal outposts from November, 2008.

After the evacuation of settlers from Hebron in December 2008, a riot ensued and a Jewish settler, Ze'ev Braude, was recorded on video shooting two unarmed Palestinians after Palestinians had hurled rocks at him. The victims were shot on their own property, which Braude had entered, and later needed surgery. The Israeli State Prosecutor's Office decided to abandon the prosecution of Braude after the Israeli High Court of Justice ruled that the prosecution must give the defendant access to "sensitive information". The prosecutor's office had earlier said that some of the evidence against Braude was classified for security reasons, due to "the Shin Bet's sources and methods of operation, and identifying details about its units and people". Braude had petitioned the High Court for access.

=== Settler extremism ===
Extremist groups associated with the settler movement included the Gush Emunim Underground, which existed from 1979 to 1984 as a militant organization linked to the settler activist group Gush Emunim. They carried out attacks against Jewish students and Palestinian officials, attempted to bomb a bus and planned an attack on the Dome of the Rock.

The New York Times has noted that the religious, ideological wing of the settler movement is growing more radical. It is widely suspected that a pipe-bomb attack on settler critic Zeev Sternhell was perpetrated by settler radicals, who left fliers at the scene offering 1 million shekels to anyone who "kills a member of anti-settlement group Peace Now". Public Security Minister Avi Dichter condemned the attack, calling it a "nationalistic terror attack".

Shin Bet security chief Yuval Diskin warned that he has "found a very high willingness among this public to use violence – not just stones, but live weapons – in order to prevent or halt a diplomatic process". He also called settlers' mindset "messianic" and "Satanic". In 2008, Gadi Shamni, a senior Israeli commander in the occupied West Bank, warned that the number of violent settlers had increased from a few dozen to hundreds, and that this rise was impairing the IDF's ability to address other threats. In August 2012, the United States defined settler attacks as 'terrorist incidents'.

=== Involvement of youths ===
Some settlers who attacked or harassed Palestinians are disaffected young adults called the Hilltop Youth by the Israeli media. In 2008, welfare minister Isaac Herzog labeled them a "security threat" as well as a "societal and educational danger." In December 2011, following an outbreak of settler violence against IDF property and personnel, Israeli defense minister Ehud Barak said, "There is no doubt that we are talking about terrorists."

== Causes of violence ==
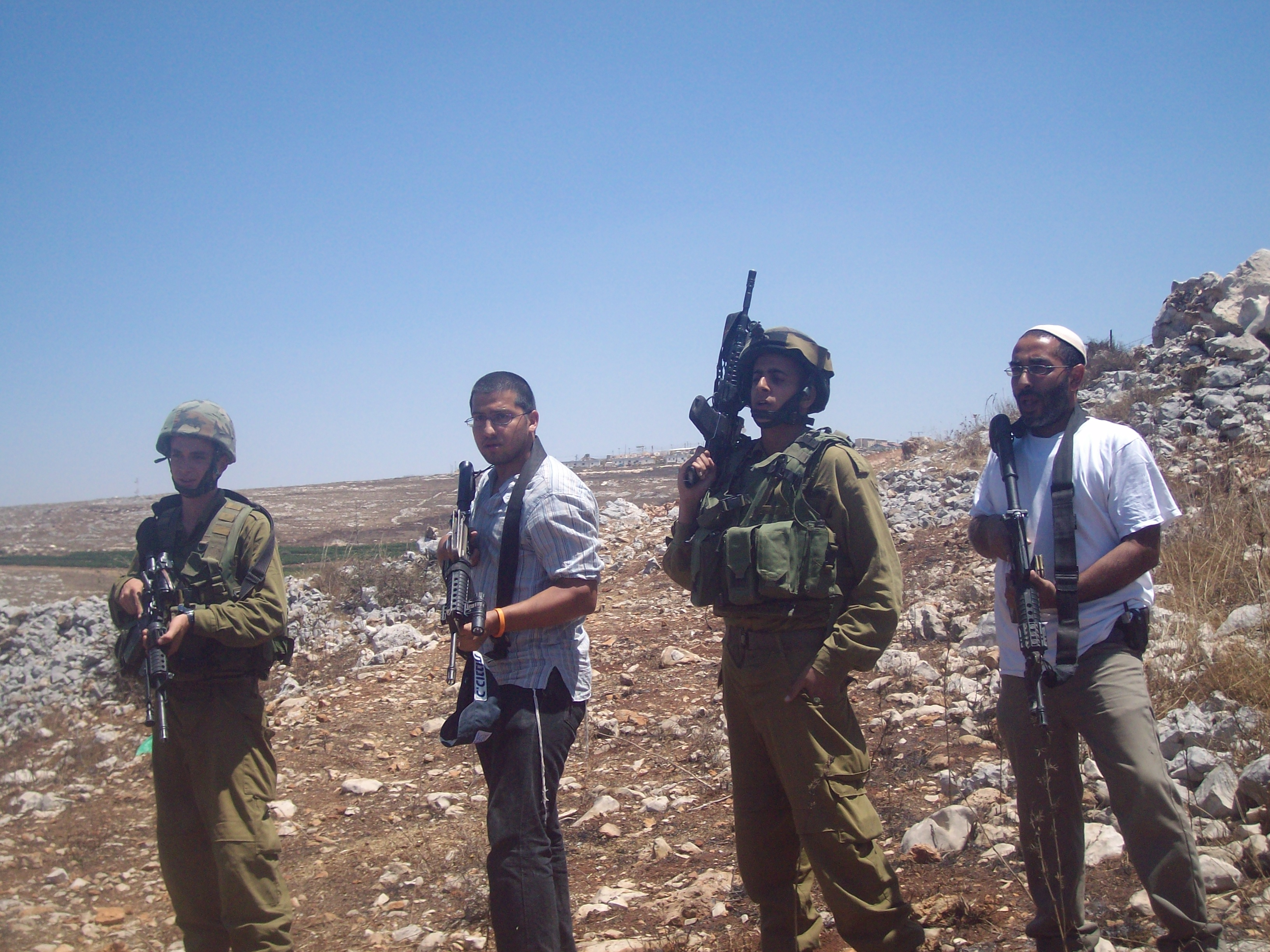
Israeli soldiers and armed settlers in Iraq Burin Palestinian village, occupied West Bank, August 2009

When an 11-year-old Palestinian girl from Nablus was killed by settlers in 1983, in their defense, the chief rabbi of the Sephardic community reportedly cited a Talmudic text justifying killing an enemy on occasions when one may see from a child's perspective that he or she will grow up to become your enemy. Rabbis have been asked by settler militants to provide rulings to justify acts that are aimed to block peace with, or the return of land to, Palestinians. The theft of Palestinian olive harvests has been justified by some rabbis. Former chief rabbi Mordechai Eliyahu stated that: "Since the land is the inheritance of the People of Israel, planting on this land by gentiles is planting on land that does not belong to them. If someone puts a tree on my land, both the tree and the fruit it yields belongs to me." Some rabbinical extremists cite the biblical edict to exterminate the Amalekites to justify both expelling Palestinians from the land and killing Arab civilians in wartime.

One of the causes of violence is settler vigilante action in response to, usually unrelated, acts of Palestinian violence.

Human rights group B'Tselem says that the violence is "a means to harass and intimidate Palestinians" and that the evacuations are a necessary part of the peace process. According to B'Tselem, when a building is evacuated by the Israeli government, settlers lash out at Palestinians because they're "easy victims" and as a means to widen the area under settler control.

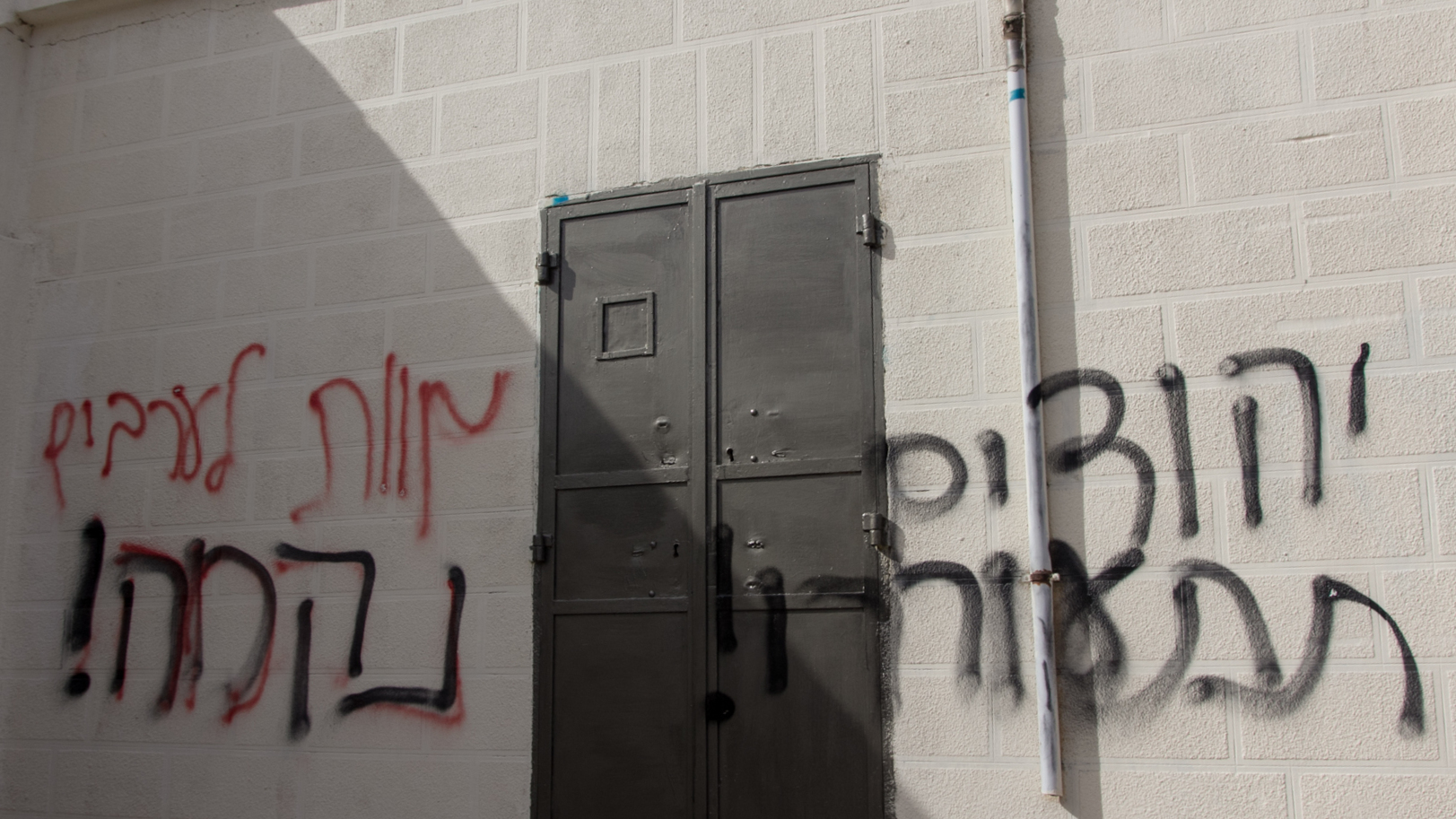
Price tag graffiti in Hebrew reading "Jews Wake up!", "Death to Arabs", and "Revenge!" on a Palestinian home in the West Bank, 2014

Ghassan Daghlas, a Palestinian Authority official who deals with the settlements issue in the northern West Bank, said, "These groups of settlers are organised and support each other...If there's an outpost evacuation, they call people from Hebron to Jenin to stop the Palestinians working on their lands". Michael Sfard, a lawyer with Yesh Din, an Israeli human rights group which monitors the violation of human rights in the Palestinian territories, stated that there are between a few dozen and a few hundred extremist settlers using a tactic called price-tagging: if the government sends police or soldiers to dismantle an outpost that is being built, the settlers make the Palestinian population pay the price. While people in the outpost are confronting the security forces, others start harassing Palestinians, forcing commanders to divert men from the outpost and making them think twice about launching future operations. It's such a big headache that many of the relevant authorities give up without trying and the outposts are quickly rebuilt once the army gives up and leaves.

== Types of attacks on Palestinians and their property ==
=== Attacks connected to the Gaza War ===
The 2025 Israel–Hamas war ceasefire was agreed upon in January, which included the release of Palestinian prisoners; on 17 January 2025, Defense Minister Israel Katz revealed the release of all seven Jewish Israelis detained for allegedly committing settler violence, with the rationale: "It is better for the families of Jewish settlers to be happy than the families of released terrorists". On 19 January, Israelis burned homes and vehicles in the villages of Turmus Ayya, Sinjil and Ein Siniya in the West Bank; the Israeli military said that it "broke up the riots and violence" and arrested two suspects. Israeli ultranationalist group 'Fighting for Life' had called for an "offensive initiative" in the West Bank "to destroy their celebrations [for the release of Palestinian prisoners] with an attack", declaring that Israelis "if needed will come to spoil the celebration of the enemy by themselves". On 20 January, Israeli settlers attacked the West Bank villages of Jinsafut and al-Funduq, with no one arrested by 22 January; the Israeli military reported that the settlers first "set fire to property", and later "threw stones and attacked the security forces".

=== Attacks on agriculture and livestock ===
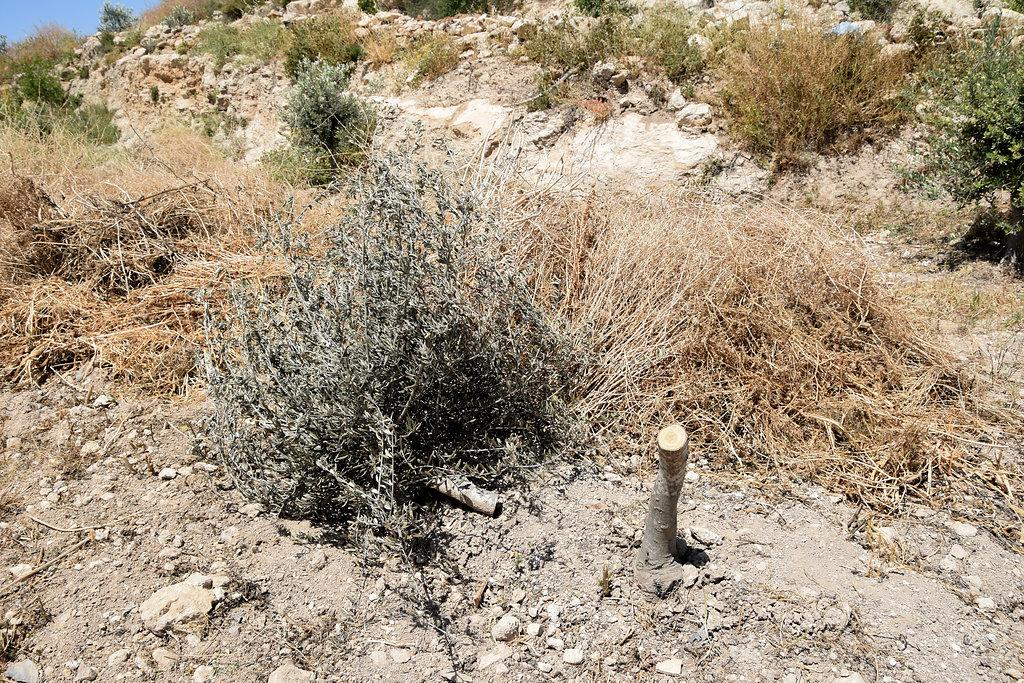
Olive tree vandalized by settlers on Hiyam Sabah's land, village of 'Urif, Nablus District. Photo by Salma a-Deb'i, B'Tselem, 29 April 2018

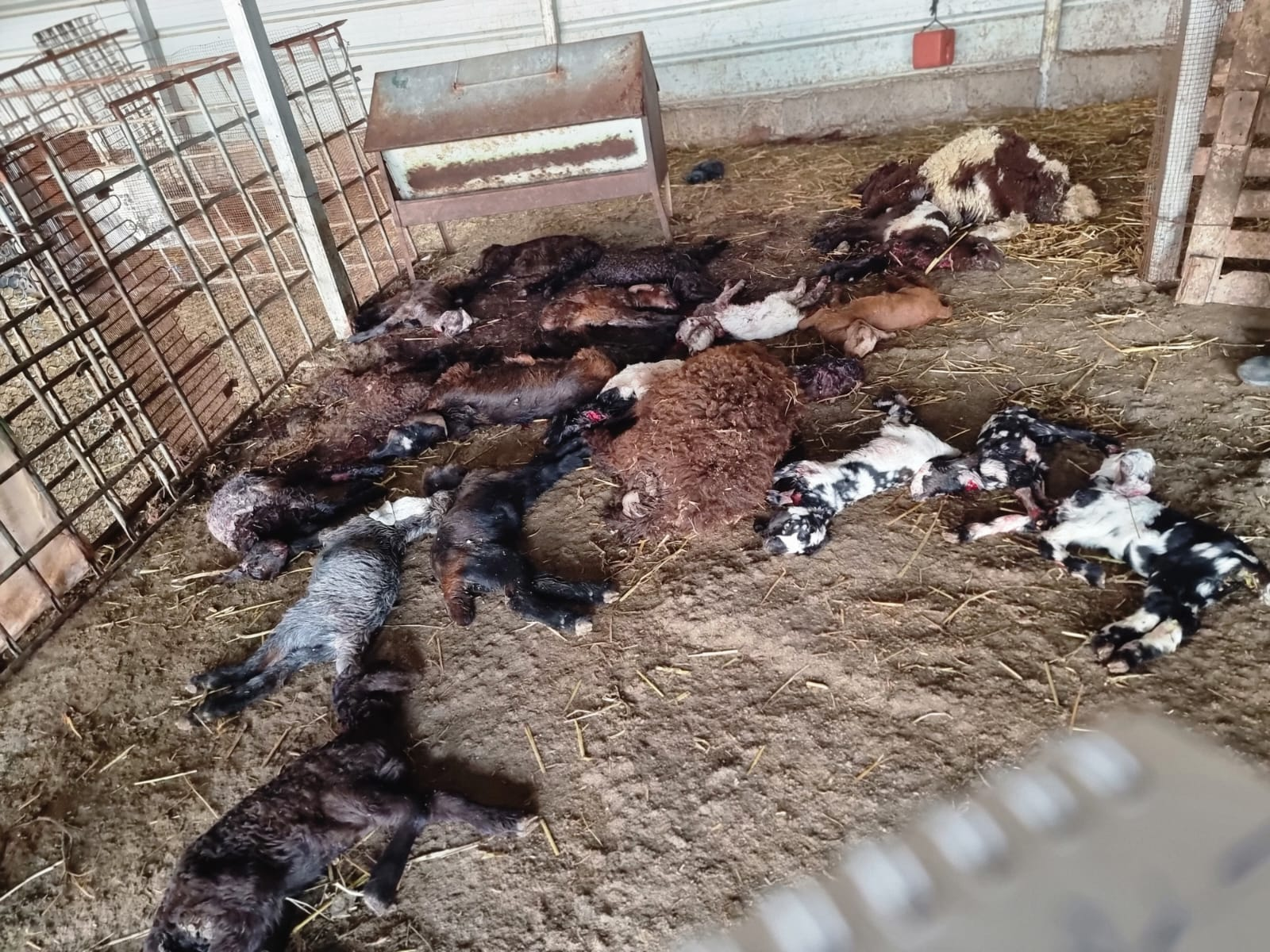
Sheep slaughtered by Israeli settlers in al-Mughayyir (Ramallah), in the occupied West Bank, April 2024

Olive farming is a major industry and employer in the Palestinian West Bank and olive trees are a common target of settler violence. According to OCHA roughly 10,000 Palestinian West Bank olive trees and saplings have suffered either uprooting or damage from Israeli attacks in 2013, a rise from about 8,500 trees damaged in 2012. B'Tselem alleges that "olive pickers in areas near certain settlements and outposts in the West Bank have been a target of attacks by settlers, who have cut down and burned olive trees and stolen the crops", and that "security forces have not taken suitable action to prevent the violence". The IDF barred olive picking in extensive areas of land, stating that the closures were to protect the olive pickers. The case went to the Israeli High Court in 2006 which found that, as a rule, lands are not to be closed because of settler violence, and that the IDF must enforce the law. According to B'Tselem the IDF has worked around this by saying the lands are closed to protect the settlers.

Amnesty International has said that scores of Palestinian-owned sheep as well as gazelles and other animals were poisoned with fluoracetamide near Tuwani on 22 March 2005, depriving Palestinian farmers of their livelihood.

In July 2009, a group of Israeli settlers riding horses and carrying torches raided Palestinian areas, burning 1,500–2,000 olive trees and stoning cars.

In March 2011, two EU heads-of-mission reports detailed a tripling of violent settler attacks over three years. The report found that the attacks were especially aimed at Palestinian farmers and their livelihood in a systematic campaign of violence and intimidation which included the destruction of over 10,000 olive trees in the preceding year. The report noted that the Israeli state had "so far failed to effectively protect the Palestinian population". An internal IDF document obtained by Haaretz revealed numerous previously unreported instances in autumn 2013 of grove vandalism and clashes near West Bank settlements, resulting in widespread property damage and injuries to farmers and volunteers.

In the 2023 olive harvest season, Yesh Din reported 113 attacks by Israeli settlers and soldiers in the West Bank that disrupted olive harvest. The attacks caused 96,000 dunams of olive-planted land to go unharvested last year, resulting in approximately US$10,000,000 in losses. According to Ghassan Al-Saher, a member of the Qaryut village council, approximately 1,340 olive trees were slashed by settlers in Qaryut in 2024. Over 150 attacks on olive pickers have been recorded in the 2025 olive harvest season.

According to Yesh Din, 97.4% of complaints submitted to Israeli police by Palestinians who had suffered damage to their olive groves between 2005 and 2013 were closed without indictment.

In October 2025, Afaf Abu Alia, a Palestinian woman, was beaten unconscious by an Israeli settler while harvesting olives, resulting in her being hospitalised. The attack was recorded by American journalist Jasper Nathaniel. In the same incident, Nathaniel was attacked by several Israeli settlers, forcing him to flee. Nathaniel stated the IDF troops stationed in the area had abandoned him and the Palestinians to the settlers, despite having warned the IDF that they feared for their safety. On 9 November, Israeli police and Shin Bet announced they had arrested a suspect in the incident.

In November 2025, Israeli settlers were recorded torturing lambs in a Palestinian-owned pen in the West Bank.

In October 2026, as the annual olive harvest began, witnesses and medical sources reported that Israeli soldiers had backed settlers in seizing Palestinian olive groves across the occupied West Bank, resulting in clashes and injuries. Dozens of masked Israeli settlers attacked Palestinians who were picking olives in the West Bank, injuring at least two people, including American journalist Heidi Levine. About 80 settlers, armed with gas canisters, confronted the villagers and threw rocks. The Israeli military appeared but failed to stop the violence. Levine was hospitalized with multiple injuries due to the attack. According to the Palestine Red Crescent Society, 12 Palestinians were hospitalized after being beaten by settlers in five separate incidents. The events prompted international concern, and Britain recently led sanctions on products from Israeli settlements, which are considered illegal under international law. Prime Minister Benjamin Netanyahu rejected the criticism, attributing the violence to a small number of individuals he described as "juvenile delinquents."

=== Attacks on churches and monasteries ===
The growing ascendency of the right-wing in politics over the past decades has led to increasing attacks on non-Jewish religious properties, associated with "price tag" attacks by settlers and their sympathizers, with a rise in attacks on churches throughout the West Bank and Jerusalem, extending even to Israel. The Patriarch of the Holy City of Jerusalem and all Palestine, Theophilos III has decried, "repeated" attacks on Christian and Muslim places of worship in the Palestinian territories by extremist Jewish settlers. Christians who have suffered such abuses often charge Israeli authorities with "not doing enough" to safeguard the population and prevent further attacks by Jews. Arab-Israeli member of the Knesset Ayman Odeh observes, "Harassment and harming of places that are holy to Islam and Christianity have become almost constant, and no one is held accountable", and directly blames the Israeli government for "leading the hatred and approving, with a wink, the continuation of the hate crimes against the Arab minority in the state".

=== Attacks on international diplomats, protestors and journalists ===
In mid-October 2026 a group of settlers reportedly attacked a group of European diplomats from France, Belgium and Poland in the Palestinian Christian village of Taybeh. Multiple videos came out following the attack including showing the mayor of Aulnoye-Aymeries, Bernard Baudoux sitting next to a destroyed vehicle and another video showing masked settlers some armed with clubs or ridding ATV's blocking the road and demanding identification. The day prior Washington Post photographer Heidi Levine and several Palestinian olive farmers, was attacked by a group of Israeli settlers while reporting on the Palestinian olive harvest at Abu Falah in the occupied West Bank. Levine was taken to a hospital in Ramallah with multiple lacerations, a broken rib, four broken vertebrae and a ripped finger. According to witnesses, Israeli soldiers who arrived fired tear gas at the Palestinians and did not attempt to control the settlers.

=== Attacks on mosques ===
In December 2009, suspected settler extremists attacked a mosque in the northern West Bank village of Yasuf near Nablus, according to Palestinian officials and Israeli police. The people forced their way into the mosque and burned about 100 holy books, including Korans, Hadiths, and prayer carpets, and spray-painted anti-Palestinian slogans on the floor, some of which referred to the settlers' price tag policy.

In January 2010, Israeli security officers raided the settlement of Yitzhar, forcibly entered the settlement's synagogue and yeshiva buildings and arrested ten settlers, including the Rosh yeshiva, for alleged involvement in the mosque attack. All were released by the court due to lack of evidence and the court reprimanded the police for arresting the rabbi. As of January 2010, no indictments were served. The state has appealed the ruling.

In September 2011, the Al-Nurayn Mosque in Qusra became the subject of an arson attack allegedly perpetrated by militant Jewish settlers, who set the mosque on fire by throwing two burning tyres through its windows. Slogans in Hebrew threatening further attacks had been graffitied on the walls, reading "Muhammad is a Pig". A star of David had also been graffitied alongside. The attack came hours after Israeli police dismantled three structures in the nearby illegal Jewish settlement of Migron, leading newspapers to suggest that it may have been carried out by settlers in retaliation.

On 12 November, the Al-Mughayyir mosque in the Ramallah and al-Bireh Governorate was damaged extensively when it was torched, reportedly by settlers in what was believed to be a price-tag attack. Israeli police say the incident does not match previous 'price tag' attacks, and that a full investigation was impossible because they were denied entry to the village by Palestinian authorities. According to Haaretz journalist Chaim Levinson, it was the 10th such mosque subject to arson in Israel and the West Bank since June 2011, and no investigation has ever led to an indictment. Settler violence has impeded Palestinians from visiting holy sites and worshipping at their mosques, and have interfered with muezzin calls for daily prayer.

=== Attacks on property ===
In March 2025, dozens of Israeli settlers attacked Palestinians and property in Jinba, close to Masafer Yatta, reportedly injuring 6 Palestinians, with Israel security forces reporting that this came after reports of attacks against Jews/Israelis south of Masafer Yatta and near Mitzpe Yair; The Times of Israel reported that the Israeli security forces arrested 22 Palestinians from Jinba, and did not arrest any Israeli settlers due to the incident. In April 2025, around 50 Israelis attacked residences and residents of Duma, setting fires, reportedly injuring three Palestinians; Israel security forces said that they conducted efforts to "disperse the violent confrontation" between Israeli civilians and Palestinians, but no arrests were announced.

In July 2015, Israeli settlers committed an arson attack on two Palestinian houses, killing 3 people, including 18-month-old Ali Saad Dawabsheh who was burned alive, and both of his parents who died from their injuries later on.

=== Attacks for retaliation ===
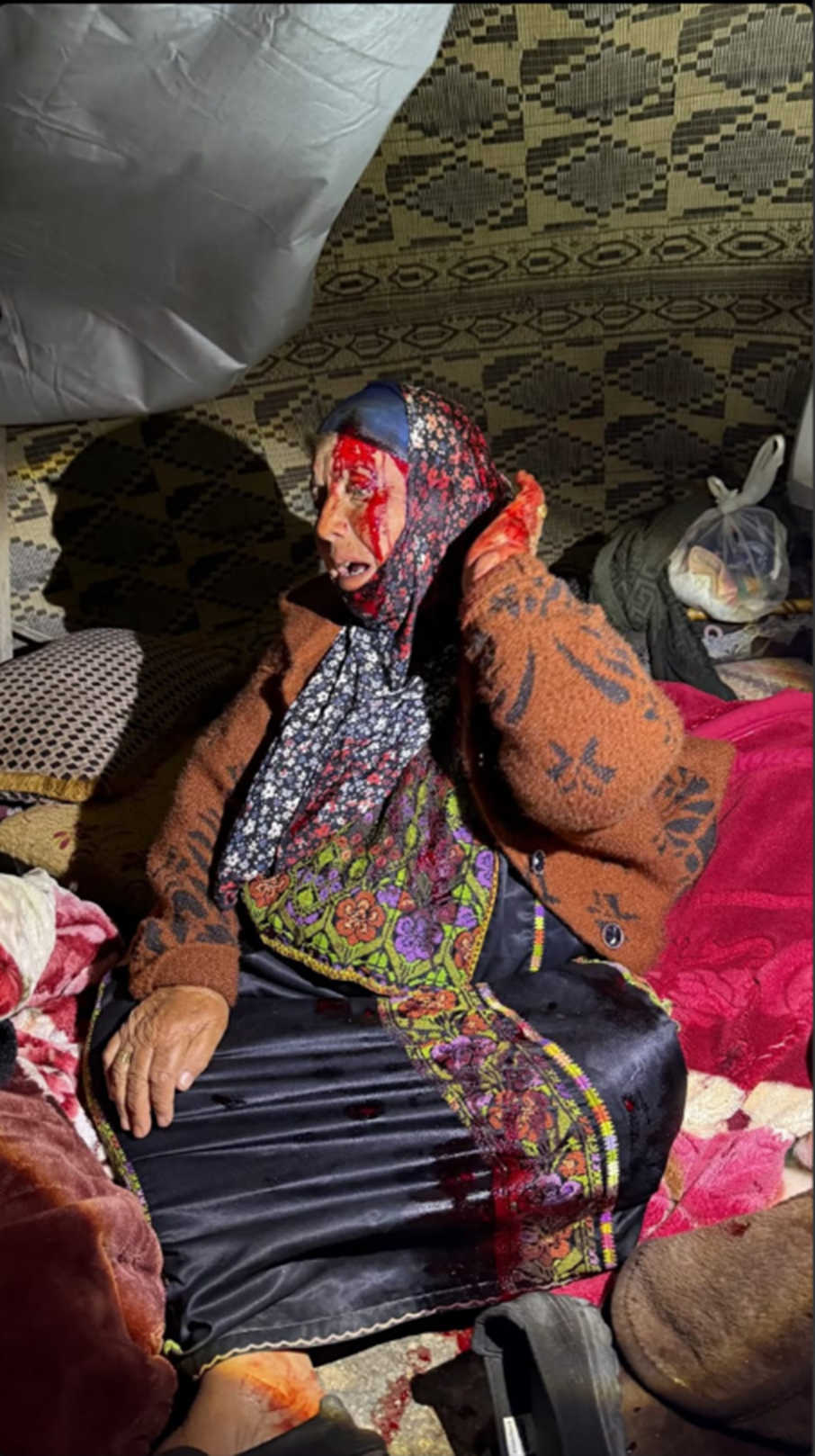
An elderly Palestinian victim of the September 2025 Khallit al-Dabe' pogrom

In July 2014, a day after the burial of three murdered Israeli teens, Mohammed Abu Khdeir, a 16-year-old Palestinian, was forced into a car on an East Jerusalem street by 3 Israelis, two teenagers led by a 30-year-old settler from the West Bank settlement of Adam. His family immediately reported the fact to Israeli Police who located his charred body a few hours later at Givat Shaul in the Jerusalem Forest. Preliminary results from the autopsy suggested that he was beaten and burnt while still alive. The murder suspects explained the attack as a response to the June abduction and murder of three Israeli teens. The murders contributed to a breakout of hostilities in the 2014 Israel–Gaza conflict. While it has become a standard operating procedure in Israel to bulldoze the homes of suspected terrorists and their families, and while Khdeir's mother requested their houses be demolished, none of the perpetrators' homes were targeted for demolition. While Palestinians are tried in military courts, West Bank settlers are tried in Israel in civil courts, and no Jewish terrorist homes have been demolished. Demolition, the state has argued, does not apply to Jewish suspects of terrorism, because "there is no need to deter potential Jewish terrorists". The European Union criticized Israel for "failing to protect the Palestinian population".

In April 2024, Israeli settlers rampaged through Palestinian villages in the West Bank after the disappearance of Israeli teenager Benjamin Achimeir on 12 April 2024, whose dead body was found a day later. In total, 11 Palestinian villages were attacked, four Palestinians were shot dead and thousands of animals were killed, while a dozen homes and over 100 cars were burned. BBC News, citing messages from Israeli settlers' WhatsApp groups and testimony from Palestinian villagers and officials, described the rampage as appearing to be an "organised campaign of revenge ... carried out by co-ordinated groups on the ground, and targeted against ordinary Palestinians with no apparent connection to the murder of Benjamin Achimeir other than the bad luck of living nearby."

Following the June 2025 settler killing of Audah Hadhaleen, settlers carried out an attack against Palestinians in the neighboring Khallit al-Dabe' village in September 2025.

In March 2026, it was reported that following the death of an 18-year-old settler Yehuda Sherman following a vehicle accident between Sherman and a Palestinian driver, settlers in WhatsApp groups called for a "revenge campaign" sparking over 20 reported arson attacks in the villages of Jalud, Qaryut, al-Funduqmiya and Silat al-Dhah with homes, vehicles and agriculture fields targeted.

=== Civilian casualties ===
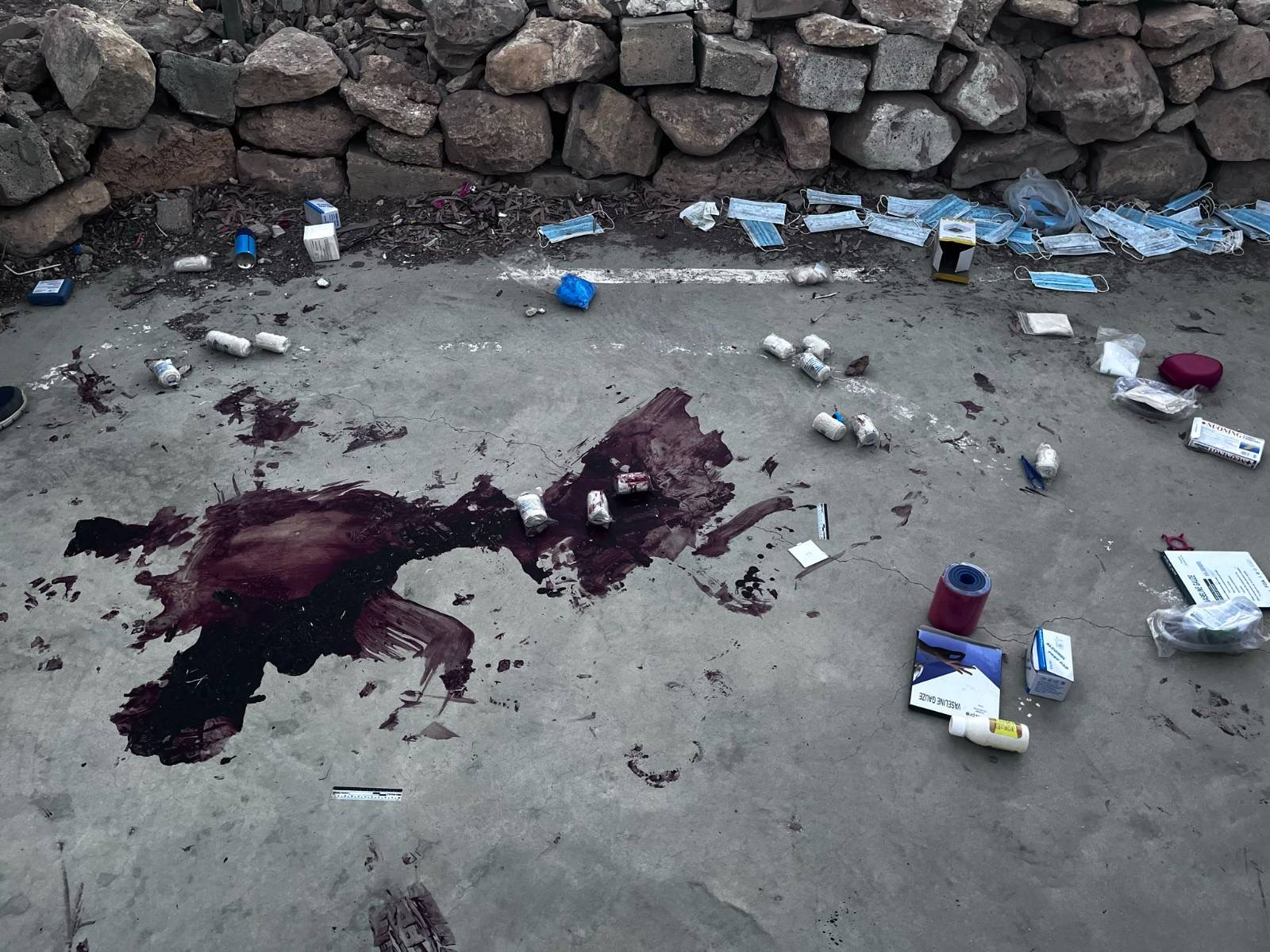
Bloodstain at the scene of the killing of Awda Hathaleen by Israeli settler on July 28, 2025

OCHA reported, from 1 January to 19 September 2023, Israeli settlers and forces killed 189 Palestinians in the occupied West Bank and wounded 8,192. OCHA also said on average, there are three cases of settlers attacking Palestinians in the West Bank of the Jordan River every day, resulting in the killing and injuring of Palestinians, harming their property, and preventing them from reaching their land, workplace, family, and friends. It was reported by the United Nations in March 2026, that since March 1 and the start of the US-Israel war with Iran six Palestinians had been killed by settlers.

=== Jerusalem Day ===
Jerusalem Day was made into a national holiday by the Knesset on 23 March 1998 to celebrate and commemorates the "reunification" of East Jerusalem with West Jerusalem following the Six-Day War of 1967. During the 2020s, there have been spikes of anti-Palestine and anti-Arab sentiment in the Jerusalem Day marches, which draw both Jerusalem residents and Israeli settlers. In 2021, racist and anti-Arab chants were sung by some of the crowd, including "Death to Arabs," and "Shuafat is on fire," a reference to the murder of 16-year-old Palestinian Mohammed Abu Khdeir who was kidnapped, beaten, and set on fire while still alive by Israeli settlers in East Jerusalem in 2014. Other incidents have been reported. In 2023, a BBC camera team was assaulted and told to "Go and be with Shireen," a reference to the Palestinian-American journalist Shireen Abu Akleh who was killed by Israeli snipers in 2022. Palestinians have reported being verbally harassed, pepper sprayed, items thrown at them, destruction of merchandise and belongings, being spat on and trespassing onto private property.

=== Threats of rape and sexual violence ===
On 24 August 2017, settlers from Kiryat Arba employed a loudspeaker system to verbally harass Palestinian residents of the al-Hariqah neighborhood in Hebron. A Palestinian volunteer for Israeli human rights organization B'Tselem recorded segments of the incident from her window, which led the settlers to target their abuse at her. They threatened violence and used racist and misogynistic language, including explicit threats such as, "The biggest dick will screw you. Come, come, come, come. We're waiting for you, you whore [...] All the Jews are waiting for you here." Despite the severity of the threats and harassment, Israeli security forces present at the scene did not intervene, allowing the settlers to continue their actions undisturbed.

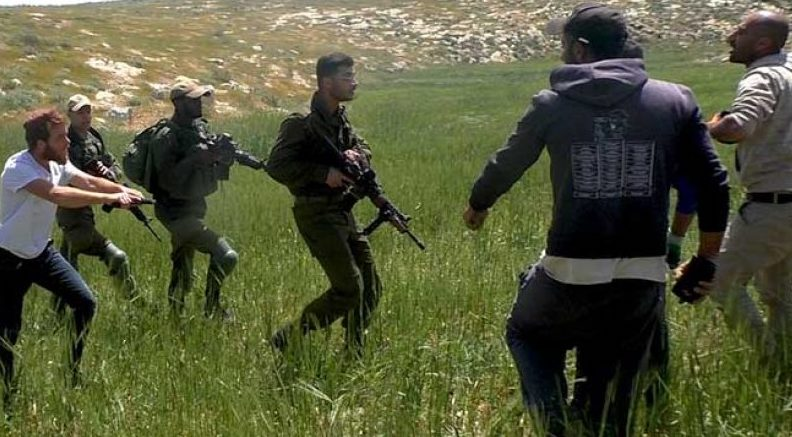
Armed Israeli settler accompanied by soldiers threatens Palestinian farmers near at-Tuwani, South Hebron Hills, April 2020

On 13 May 2021, around 10 settlers gathered near the fence erected by the Israeli military around a Palestinian neighborhood in Hebron, throwing stones at passersby and nearby homes while several soldiers observed without intervening. After approximately an hour and a half, the soldiers left without making any arrests or addressing the settlers' actions. The settlers continued to throw stones on the street that night and in the following days, while both settlers and soldiers subjected Palestinians documenting the events to verbal harassment with homophobic, transphobic and sexist slurs.

On 12 October 2023, settlers dressed in army uniforms detained three Palestinians from the West Bank village of Wadi as-Seeq: Mohammad Khaled, 27, Abu Hassan, 46, both employees of the Palestinian Authority, and a local resident aged 30. All of them reported severe mistreatment during their detention. Khaled described the abuse, stating, "They had an iron pipe and knives, which they also used to hit us. They beat us everywhere, hands, chest, and head too. Everywhere. They stubbed out cigarettes on us. They tried to pull out my fingernails." Hassan compared the abuse to the Abu Ghraib prison, saying, "You heard about the Abu Ghraib prison in Iraq? It's exactly like what happened there. Abu Ghraib with the [Israeli] army." He also recounted, "They poured water on us, urinated on us, and then someone holding a stick tried to shove it up my rear. I fought with all my strength until he simply gave up." A photograph taken during their detention was posted on the Facebook page of Metzuda – the Security World of Israel, showing the detainees and captioned, "A terrorist penetration incident at the Ben Pazi farm near Kochav Hashachar. Our forces captured the terrorists." The image was later removed.

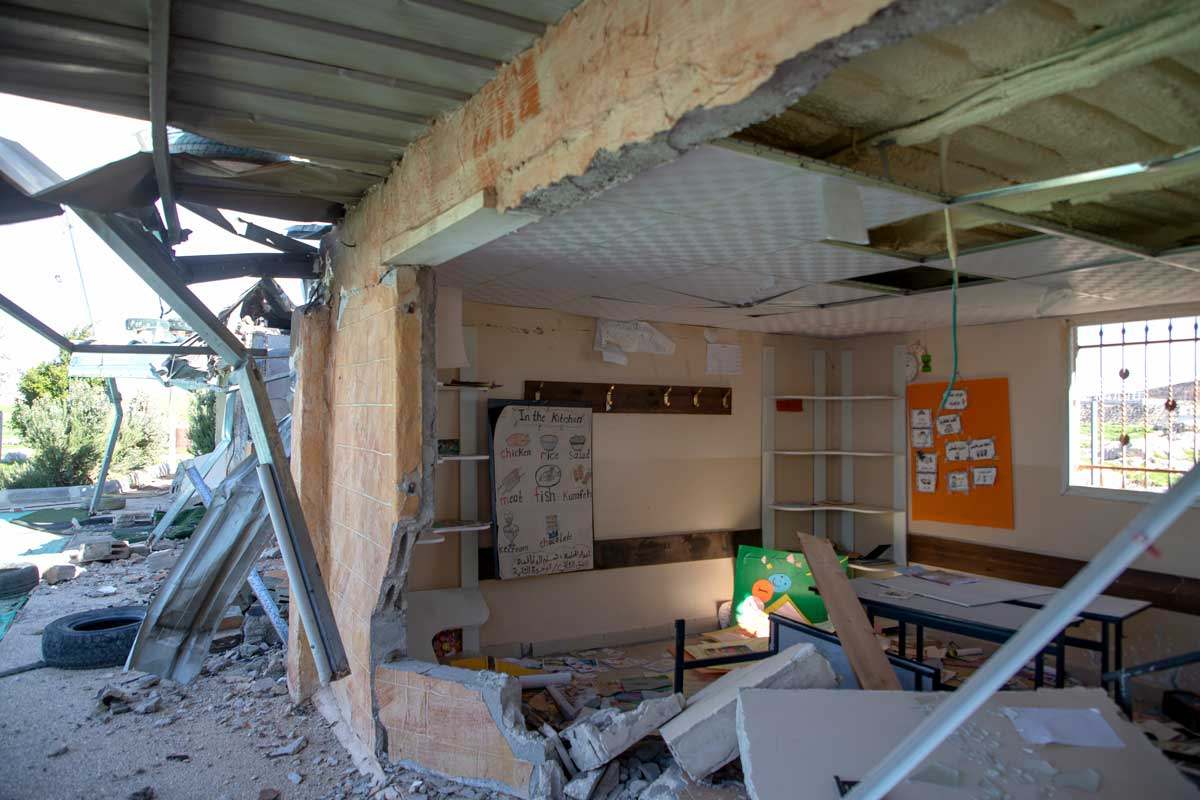
Khirbet Zanuta school destroyed by settlers, December 2023

On 17 April 2024, Human Rights Watch reported that the Israeli military either participated in or failed to protect Palestinians from violent settler attacks in the West Bank, resulting in the displacement of people from 20 communities and the complete uprooting of at least seven communities since October 2023. Settlers were involved in assaults, torture, sexual violence, theft of property and livestock, threats of permanent expulsion, and the destruction of homes and schools. Bill Van Esveld, associate children's rights director at Human Rights Watch, stated, "Settlers and soldiers have displaced entire Palestinian communities, destroying every home, with the apparent backing of higher Israeli authorities." He also noted, "While the attention of the world is focused on Gaza, abuses in the West Bank, fueled by decades of impunity and complacency among Israel's allies, are soaring."

On 25 July 2024, Australia joined Europe and the United States in imposing sanctions on Israeli settlers accused of beatings, sexual assault and torture of Palestinians in the occupied West Bank. Australia's Foreign Minister Penny Wong declared financial sanctions and travel restrictions on seven individuals along with the Hilltop Youth settler group. "The individuals sanctioned today have been involved in violent attacks on Palestinians," Wong said. "This includes beatings, sexual assault and torture of Palestinians resulting in serious injury and in some cases, death." The decision aligned with measures taken by the US, Britain, Canada, and the European Union, all of which had also imposed sanctions on Israeli settlers.

On 4 August 2024, a masked settler on horseback arrived at Khirbet Wadi a-Rakhim in the South Hebron Hills, herding approximately 20 cows into a barley field owned by the Harini family. Shortly thereafter, three additional settlers, including the identified Shem Tov Luski, arrived by car. The settlers, some carrying clubs, approached the Harini family's home, claiming ownership of the land, house, and well, and engaging in verbal abuse. Luski also sexually harassed a family member, making references to the military detention facility Sde Teiman and threatening sexual violence with comments such as, "You look so fresh. So sweet. I'll be happy to sit with you in jail someday. I would be happy. You know Sde Teiman? Ooh-ooh. Rape in the name of God." Despite calls to the police from residents and international activists, no officers were dispatched, and the residents were advised to file a complaint at the Kiryat Arba police station.

=== Settler riots ===
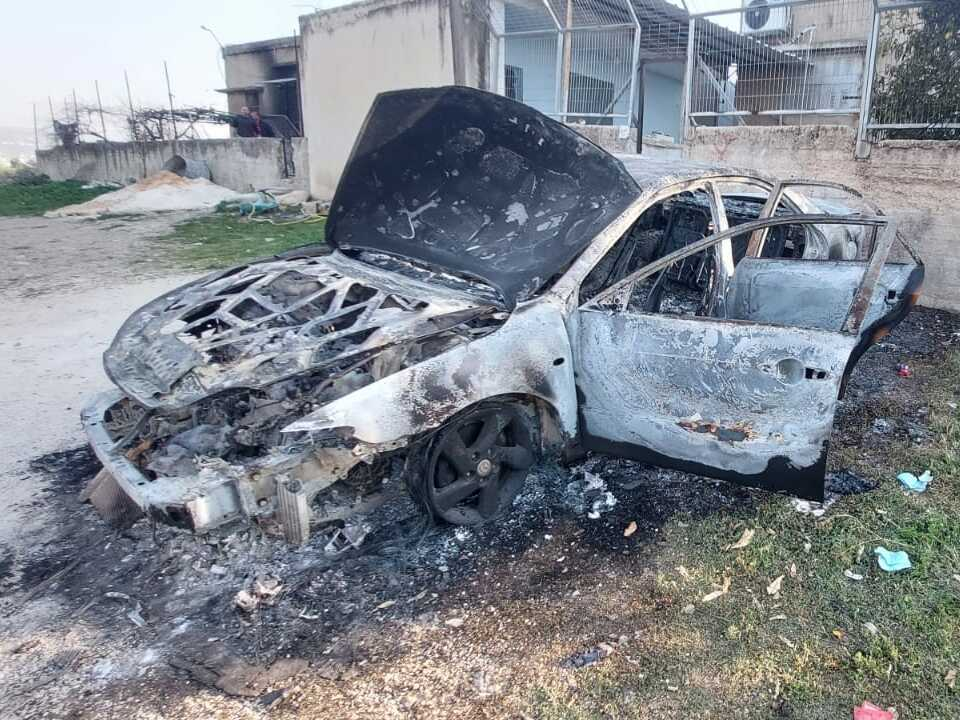
A car set on fire by Israeli settlers during the Huwara rampage, 2023

Israeli withdrawals from Gaza (in 2005) and an eviction in Hebron (in 2008) triggered settler rioting in protest. There is also continual conflict between settlers and Palestinians over land, resources and perceived grievances. In August 2007, soldiers clashed with settlers during a raid in Hebron. Paint and eggs were thrown at the soldiers.

A violent settler protest at the Palestinian village of Funduk occurred in November 2007, in which hundreds of extremist settlers converged at the entrance of the village and rampaged after 29-year-old local settler Ido Zoldan was shot dead in his car by Palestinian gunmen at the entrance to Funduk. The settlers smashed the windows of houses and cars. According to Funduk villagers, Israeli soldiers and police accompanied the protesters but mostly stood aside while the settlers rampaged.

In December 2008, Hebron settlers angry at the eviction of settlers from a disputed house rioted, shooting three Palestinian rock-throwers and burning Palestinian homes and olive groves. Video footage of the attacks was recorded, leading to widespread condemnation in Israel. The attacks were characterized as "a pogrom" by Israeli prime minister Ehud Olmert, who said he was ashamed "as a Jew."

Local Palestinians stated that once the disputed house was evicted, the IDF and the police were "indifferent" to the violence against the Palestinians and have made no real attempt to stop the settlers from rioting.

Some settlers have publicly adopted a "price tag" policy whereby settlers attack Palestinian villages in retaliation after settler outposts are removed by the Israeli government.

In April 2009, dozens of settlers from Bat Ayin rampaged through the West Bank village of Safa, smashing car windows, damaging homes and wounding 12 Palestinians. An Israeli army spokeswoman said that the violence started when Palestinians threw stones at Bat Ayin settlers praying on a nearby hill before the Jewish Passover holiday.

The United Nations has warned that as many as 250,000 Palestinians in 83 villages are "highly or moderately" vulnerable to settler retaliation if the unauthorized outposts in the West Bank are removed by the Israeli government. A total of 75,900 Palestinians in 22 villages are "highly vulnerable." The report also warns that a number of roads around Palestinian villages may become dangerous for the Palestinians to use. The settlements of Havat Gilad, Kedumim, Itamar, Yitzhar, Ma'aleh Levona, Shilo, Adei Ad, Nokdim, Bat Ayin, Negohot, Kiryat Arba, Beit Haggai, Carmel, and Susya are considered possible threats to nearby Palestinians. The report criticizes "the inadequate level of law enforcement by the Israeli authorities" and "the ambiguous message delivered by the Government of Israel and the IDF top officials to the security forces in the field regarding their authority and responsibility to enforce the law on Israeli settlers."

=== Well contamination and water access ===
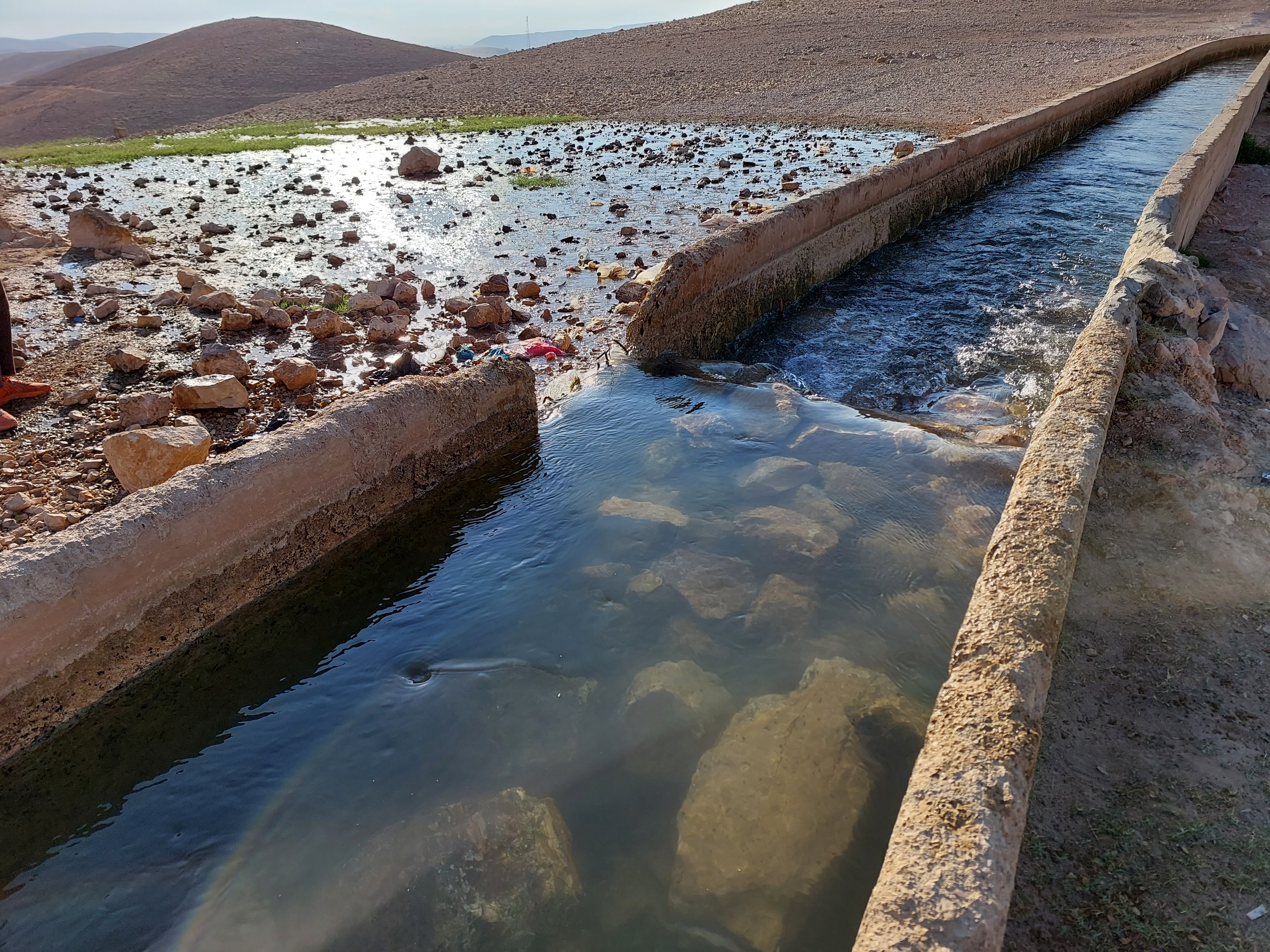
Damage to the water channel to Auja due to Hilltop Youth vandalism, September 2024

On 13 July 2004, residents of Hirbat Atwana near Hebron found rotting chicken carcasses in their well after four Jewish settlers were seen in the village. Israeli police said they suspected militant Jews from a nearby settlement outpost called Havat Maon. Settlers blamed the action on "internal tribal fight between the Palestinians;" Israeli police spokesman Doron Ben-Amo said it was "unlikely" that the Palestinians would contaminate their own well. On 9 December 2007, members of Christian Peacemaker Teams, an American NGO, reported to have observed a group of Israelis stop next to a cistern in Humra Valley, open the lid, and raise the bucket. The water was later found to be contaminated. Oxfam, a British NGO, has reported that settlers deliberately poisoned the only well in Madama, a village near Nablus, by dumping used diapers into it; and that they shot aid workers who came to clean the well.

A United Nations survey released in March 2012 documented the increasing use of threats, violence and intimidation to deny Palestinians access to their water resources in the West Bank. The survey stated that Israeli settlers have been acting systematically to gain control of some 56 springs, most of which are located on private Palestinian land. The report noted that settler actions included "trespass, intimidation and physical assault, stealing of private property, and construction without a building permit". The report criticized the Israeli authorities for having "systematically failed to enforce the law on those responsible for these acts and to provide Palestinians with any effective remedy".

== Israeli response ==
=== Administrative detention ===
Following an attack by settlers on an IDF army base on 13 December 2011, the Israeli government authorized administrative detention and military trial for settlers who engaged in violent actions, similar to the treatment accorded Palestinian activists who engage in similar behavior. The IDF was granted the power to arrest violent settlers and plans were announced to increase security on the West Bank and restrict access by known troublemakers. Israeli Prime Minister Benjamin Netanyahu characterized the situation as a handful of extremists in a population of generally law-abiding settlers. Five West Bank Israelis who are alleged to have planned and participated in the attack on the army base were indicted by the District Court of Jerusalem on 8 January 2012.

=== Criticism of violence by settler leaders ===
The violence by extremist settlers against Palestinians has been condemned by leading religious, political and municipal figures in the West Bank, including Rabbi Menachem Fruman of Tekoa, who said: "Targeting Palestinians and their property is a shocking thing, (...) It's an act of hurting humanity. (...) This builds a wall of fire between Jews and Arabs." According to former Israeli Defense Minister Moshe Ya'alon, "most of those extreme right wing activists" are not settlers and do not represent the settlements community.

The Yesha Council and former Knesset member Hanan Porat has also condemned violence against Palestinians. "The 'price tag' response is immoral", Porat said. "It's unheard of that one needs to burn the vineyards and fields of Arabs. It's immoral ... and it gives legitimacy to those who are interested in undermining the outpost issue. It's a very grave matter."

Yesha Council is the umbrella organization of municipal councils of Jewish settlements in the West Bank. Council chairman Dani Dayan said that settlers must not use violence to advance their means. He said that such actions were "morally bankrupt" and serve only to "hinder the settlers' struggle".

In May 2026, the exhumation of a Palestinian man by settlers further increased criticism of settler violence. It was reported that Israeli settlers exhumed the body of a recently buried Palestinian man in the northern West Bank while Israeli soldiers were present at the scene. The incident drew widespread condemnation after the family was forced to rebury the body elsewhere. The Times of Israel described the act as a violation of human dignity and criticized the conduct of soldiers for failing to intervene. The United Nations Human Rights Office for the Occupied Palestinian Territory called the incident "despicable" and said it reflected a "new level of dehumanization of Palestinians" in the occupied West Bank.

=== Law enforcement action against settlers ===
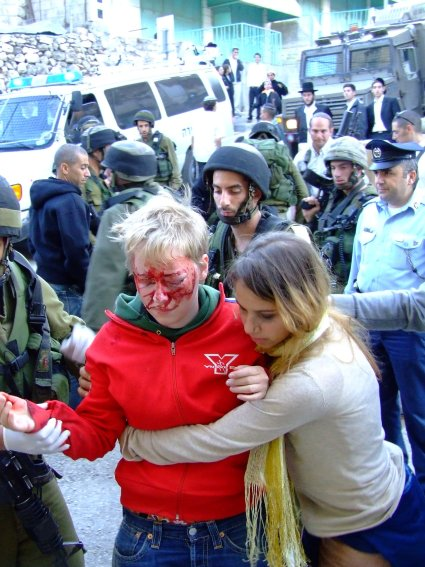
Swedish volunteer Tove Johansson (pictured) suffered a broken cheekbone from a hit in the face with a bottle by an Israeli settler in Hebron on November 18, 2006. She and other European members of the International Solidarity Movement sought to escort Palestinian children home from school.

The United Nations Fact Finding Mission on the Gaza Conflict reported on rioting and violence in the West Bank in the period preceding the Israeli military operations in Gaza. The report said "Little if any action is taken by the Israeli authorities to investigate, prosecute and punish violence against Palestinians, including killings, by settlers and members of the security forces, resulting in a situation of impunity. The Mission concluded that Israel had failed to fulfill its obligations to protect the Palestinians from violence by private individuals under both international human rights law and international humanitarian law. The report also stated that the advisory opinion of the International Court of Justice and "a number of United Nations resolutions have all affirmed that Israel's practice of constructing settlements – in effect, the transfer by an occupying Power of parts of its own civilian population into the territory it occupies – constitutes a breach of the Fourth Geneva Convention".

According to Amos Harel, attempts by the security forces to bring violent right-wing zealots to justice have suffered from two main problems: investigating Israelis as opposed to Palestinians is subject to more restrictions, and courts have proved to be lenient. Human rights nonprofit Yesh Din has produced a report, "A Semblance of Law", which found problems with law enforcement actions against Israelis in the West Bank. According to Yesh Din's study, which was conducted in 2005, among complaints against Israelis, more than 90% were closed without indictments mainly due to perpetrators not being found, 5% were lost and never investigated, and 96% of trespassing cases (including sabotage of trees) and 100% of vandalism and other property offense complaints led to no indictment.

As well as collecting statistics, Yesh Din examined 42 closed investigation files and found a number of shortcomings, including the use of Hebrew to record testimonies given in Arabic; frequent failure to check the scene where the alleged offense took place; often not taking down eye-witness testimonies; widespread lack of recourse to live identification line-ups with suspected Israeli civilians; hardly any confrontations between complainants and suspects; failure to check alibis; hasty closure of files shortly after the complaint was registered: closing of files even when evidence was sufficient to indict suspects: police refusing to register complaints, and pressure from the Civilian Administration being used to avoid filing complaints.

8% of complaints resulted in indictments. The Israeli Justice Ministry responded by stating that legal authorities were closely following specific cases, but said that it was not in its authority to deal with every case.

Israeli security sources have said that it has become customary for some settlers to take the law into their own hands in the wake of Palestinian terror attacks in the West Bank.

In 2008–2009, the defense establishment began taking a harder line against unruly settlers.

In 2012, two EU heads of mission reports stated that Israel's security operations in the occupied territories had failed to protect the Palestinian population; it accused Israel of setting up its operations to minimize the impact on settlers of an ongoing campaign of settler violence. The reports noted that, "Over 90% of monitored complaints regarding settler violence filed by Palestinians with the Israeli police in recent years have been closed without indictment", and further added that, "discriminatory protections and privileges for settlers compound these abuses and create an environment in which settlers can act with apparent impunity".

In June 2025, the Association for Civil Rights in Israel (ACRI) and Bimkom – Planners for Planning Rights petitioned the Supreme Court on behalf of Palestinian farmers from Wadi al-Far'a in the Jordan Valley, who had been blocked from reaching their land since October 2023 by settler Moshe Sharvit and his unauthorized outpost; in March 2026 the Court issued an interim order requiring the army to remove Sharvit and those acting on his behalf from the land.

=== Settler claims of orchestrated vandalism ===
A settler group named Tazpit Unit claimed to have documented Palestinians destroying trees with the intention of blaming settlers for the destruction. Photos taken by the group allegedly show Palestinians and left-wing activists cutting down Palestinian olive trees using an electric saw. The settlers stated that many of the reported "price tag" operations by settlers were actually carried out by Palestinians with the aim of tarnishing the settlers' image.

Israeli settlers were accused by an Arab farmer of having gathered his sheep into an area thick with brush and setting fire to the bushes, burning alive his 12 pregnant ewes. The police questioned the farmer's description of religious settlers wearing skullcaps driving a car on Sabbath, as Orthodox Jews do not drive on this day. Caroline Glick writing in the Jerusalem Post reported that the farmer later admitted that he lost control of a brush fire that was responsible for the damage. Israeli media network Arutz Sheva said this incident exposed the tactic of leftists of accepting Arab claims and falsely accusing Jews.

In March 2012, two Arab males of Beit Zarzir confessed, after being arrested, to damaging a local school for Arab and Jewish students. They admitted responsibility for having sprayed on the wall of the school, "Death to Arabs". The school was sprayed twice in February with the slogans "price tag", "Death to Arabs", and "Holocaust to the Arabs".

== International response ==
=== Reactions ===
In December 2011, following a briefing to the United Nations Security Council, all of the regional and political groupings seated at the council issued statements expressing dismay at violence by settlers and right-wing activists, naming the issue as an obstacle to the resumption of peace talks.

In one of a number of statements on the issue, the EU expressed "deep concern regarding settler extremism and incitement by settlers in the West Bank". The statement further added that "the EU condemns continuous settler violence and deliberate provocations against Palestinian civilians. It calls on the government of Israel to bring the perpetrators to justice and to comply with its obligations under international law."

=== Sanctions ===
Israeli settler violence received greater attention by the US government following the outbreak of the Gaza war in October 2023. While Rights groups have demanded US Secretary of State Blinken to punish Israeli settlement groups for their actions against Palestinians in the West Bank, many have also stressed that the sanctions do not go far enough because the Israeli government supports the settlements itself. On 5 December 2023, Blinken introduced new visa restrictions regarding entry to the US of persons who committed acts of violence in the West Bank. On 1 February 2024, US President Biden issued an executive order due to high levels of settler violence, forced displacement of Palestinians, and property destruction in the West Bank. The order imposes sanctions on foreign persons determined to be responsible for or complicit in actions that threaten the peace, security, or stability of the West Bank. It blocks their property interests in the US, suspends their entry into the country and prohibits transactions with sanctioned persons. The stated objective is to address events regarded by the administration as "an unusual and extraordinary threat" undermining US foreign policy objectives and threatening security in the region.

Sanctions were announced in February 2024 by the United Kingdom against extremist Israeli settlers who have violently attacked Palestinians in the West Bank. The sanctions include financial and travel restrictions with four settlers being sanctioned initially after documentation showed they engaged in systematic intimidation and violence against Palestinians; at times at gunpoint, to make them leave their homes. Further sanctions against violent settlers were announced by the European Union on 19 April 2024 as the European Council blacklisted the right-wing organizations Lehava and Hilltop Youth and the individuals Meir Ettinger, Elisha Yered, Neria Ben Pazi and Yinon Levi Because of violence against Palestinians in the West Bank and Jerusalem on February 28, France imposed sanctions against extremist Israeli settlers, including a ban on entering French territory. Also, Emanuel Macron's office said they are considering extending sanctions on Israeli settlers. In July 2025, sanctioned settler Yinon Levi killed Palestinian activist Awdah Hathaleen in his village.

== Statistics ==
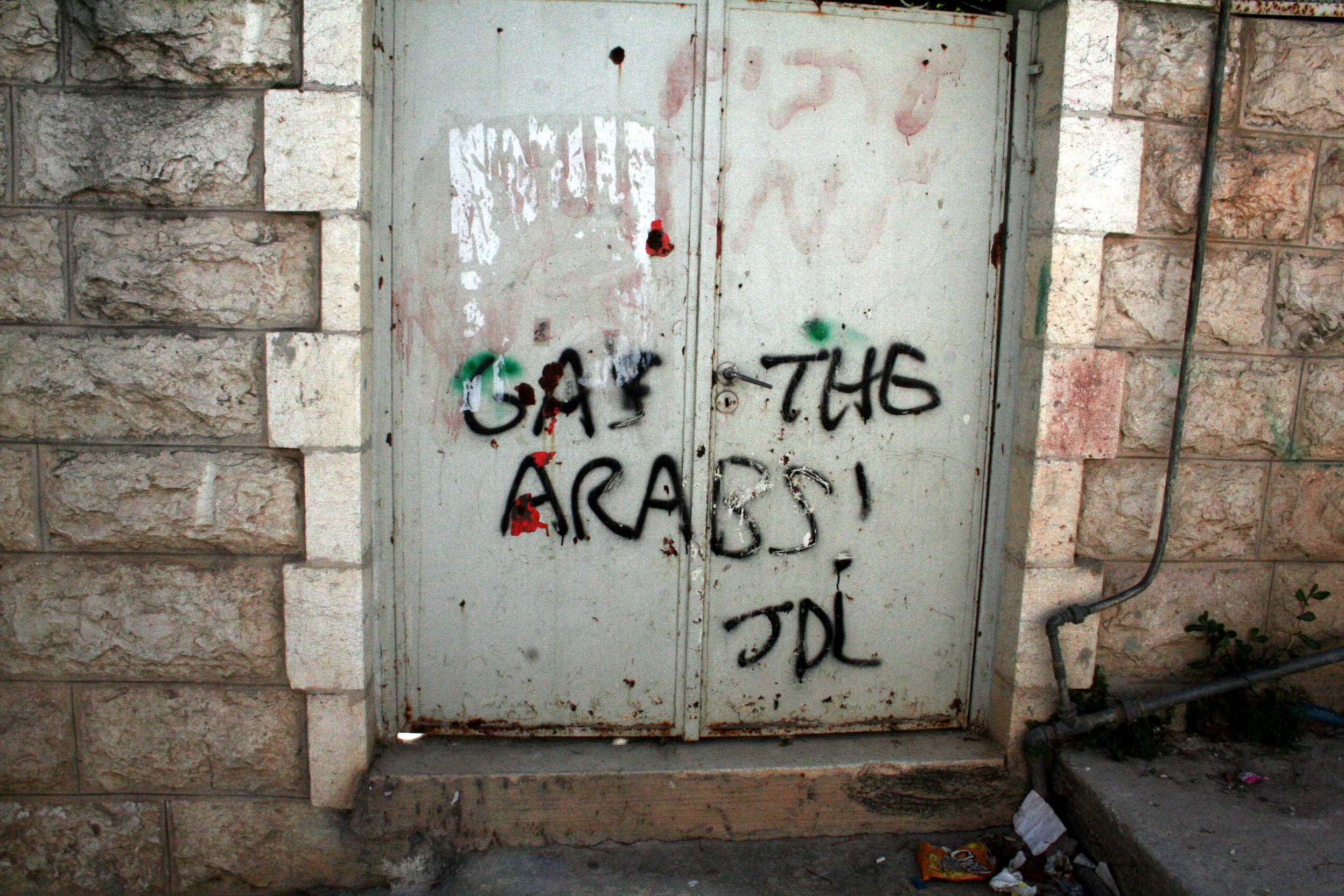
Graffiti in Hebron, in the Israeli-occupied West Bank, calling for the gassing of Arabs, above a tag for the right-wing group the Jewish Defense League

The United Nations Office for the Coordination of Humanitarian Affairs shows that more Palestinians were injured either by settlers or members of the Israeli security forces in attacks in the first six months of 2021 than in the whole of 2020 and about equal to the total for 2019. B'Tselem has logged a 33 per cent increase in attacks during the first six months of 2021 compared with the same period last year and said this was "enacted with an increasingly open cooperation by Israel's security forces and with the full backing of Israeli authorities". On 19 October 2021, Linda Thomas-Greenfield told the United Nations Security Council "We are deeply concerned by the violence perpetrated by Israeli settlers in the West Bank against Palestinians and their property," and that "Reports of masked men terrorizing a village in Hebron, destroying homes and injuring children on September 28, and similar acts elsewhere in the West Bank, are abhorrent." She said that the US "appreciated the strong and unequivocal condemnation of this violence by Foreign Minister Lapid, Defense Minister Gantz, and others in the Israeli government," while urging Israel "to investigate these incidents fully, including the response by Israeli security forces."

On 14 November 2021, a report by B'Tselem detailed the takeover of nearly 11 square miles (28 km^{2}) of farm and pasture land by settlers over the past five years and that recent months have seen a steep increase in violence committed by Jewish settlers. The NGO said that Israel has been using settler violence as a "major informal tool" to drive Palestinians from farming and pasture lands in the occupied West Bank. Haaretz asked the Israel Defense Forces, the police and the Coordinator of Government Activities in the Territories for a response to the report's conclusion that violence from the outposts and isolated farms serves the state. The IDF Spokesperson's Office said: "The IDF invests a lot of effort in attempts to eradicate the violent incidents in the area, and is in direct contact with the various civilian and security entities in these areas. The IDF will continue to operate in the region, in order to enable law and security in the area." The police and COGAT declined to comment.

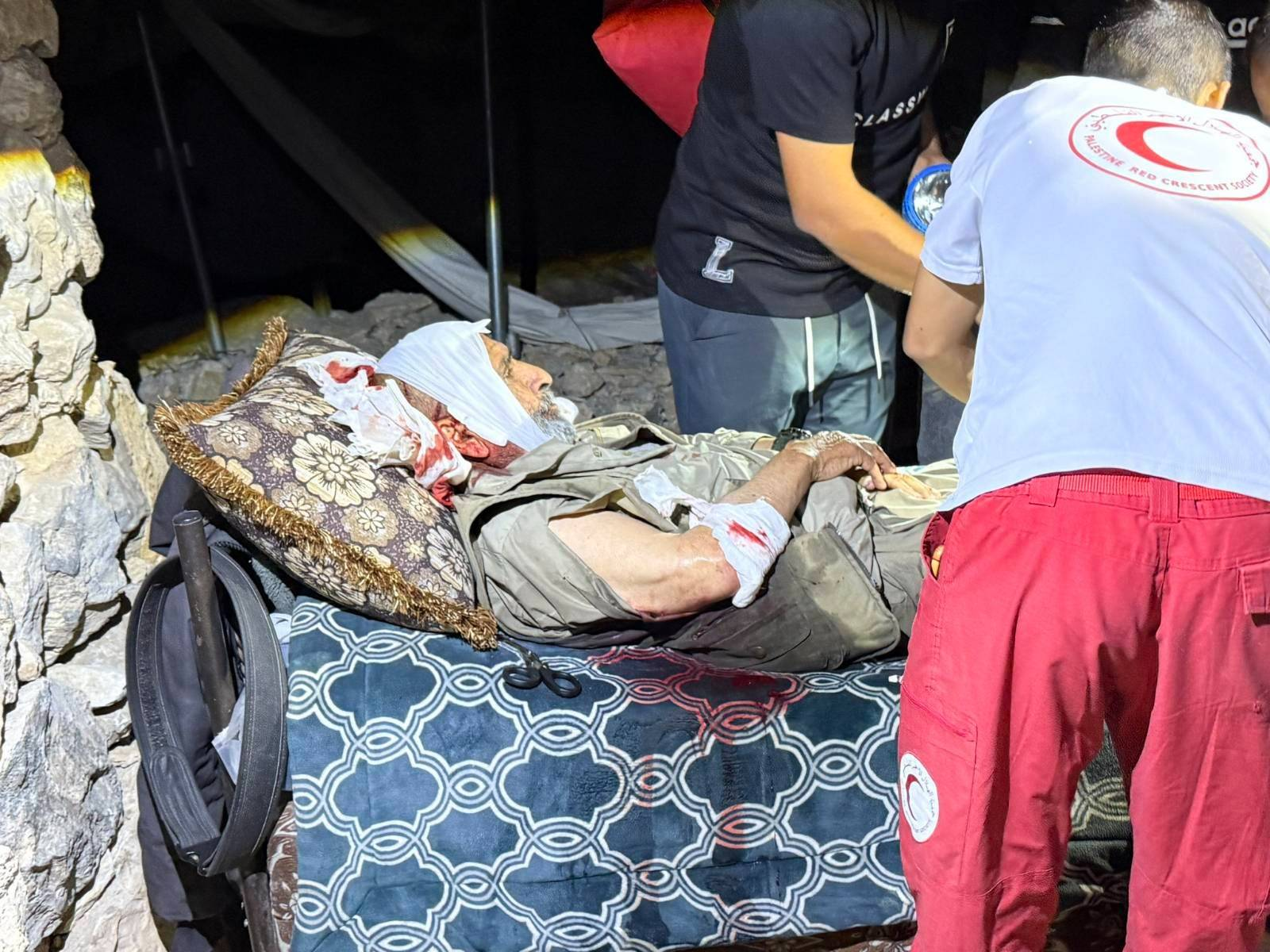
On 4 September 2025, in the Palestinian village of Khallet Athaba' in the occupied West Bank, a Palestinian man is treated by the Red Crescent after being injured in an attack by Israeli settlers

Settler violence increased following the election of the thirty-seventh government of Israel in December 2022, which was notable for its support for expanding Israeli settlements in the Palestinian territories. Settler violence increased further following Hamas's attack on Israel on 7 October 2023. B'Tselem told BBC News that in first six days since the attack, there was an "organised effort by settlers to use the fact that the entire international and local attention is focused on Gaza and the north of Israel to try to seize land in the West Bank" and had recorded at least 46 incidents in which settlers threatened, physically attacked or damaged the property of Palestinians. In November 2023, United Nations officials stated that since the attacks, the Israel Defense Forces and armed settlers killed more than 120 Palestinians in the West Bank, with most deaths occurring in clashes with Israeli soldiers. By January 2025, the Palestinian Ministry of Health stated that at least 870 Palestinians, including 177 children, had been killed by settlers and the IDF in the West Bank since the 7 October attacks.

According to the UN Office for the Coordination of Humanitarian Affairs (OCHA), between 1 January and 10 July 2026, attacks by Israeli settlers and the demolition of homes and other structures resulted in the displacement of more than 3,200 Palestinians across the West Bank. This equates to an average of 17 people displaced each day—double the daily average recorded over the preceding three years.

In the first ten days of July alone, 67 people were displaced as a result of demolitions, during which 24 structures were razed. Among these were two buildings that had been financed by donors to provide shelter and support for vulnerable families. OCHA noted that the demolitions were carried out by Israeli authorities on the grounds that the structures lacked building permits—permits that Palestinians face nearly insurmountable obstacles in obtaining.

== See also ==
- Far-right politics in Israel
- Israeli settlements
- Jewish religious terrorism
- Zionist political violence
- Killing of Awdah Hathaleen
