= Schick models of Jerusalem =

Wooden models of notable buildings in Jerusalem

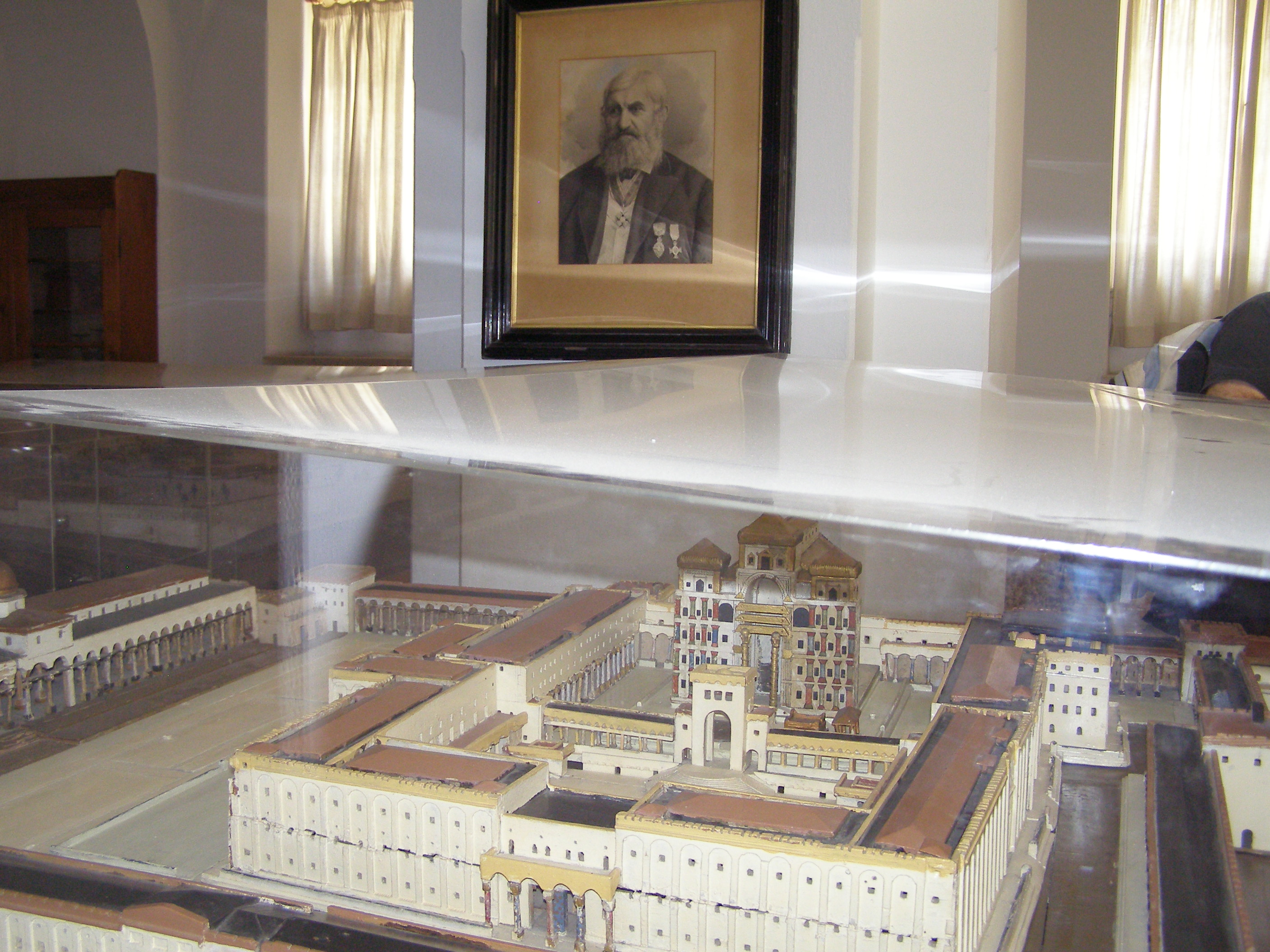
Schick's model of Herod's Temple on the Temple Mount, Schmidt's Girls College, Jerusalem, with portrait of Schick in the background

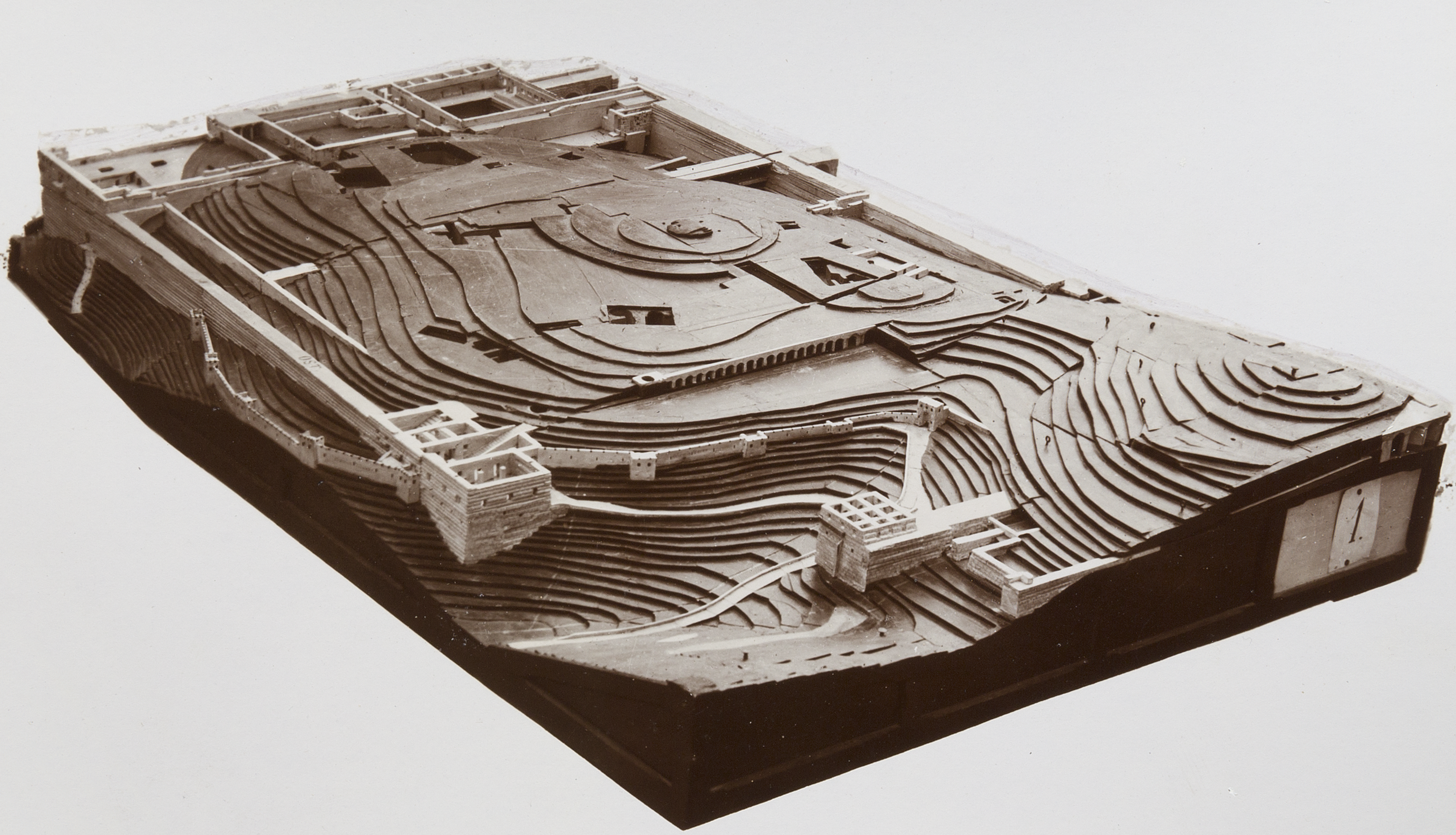
Schick's model of Temple Mount foundations

The Schick models of Jerusalem are notable wooden models of buildings and areas in the city of Jerusalem constructed by Conrad Schick in the late 19th century. The series of models covered the Church of the Holy Sepulchre, the Islamic buildings of Al-Aqsa on the Temple Mount and the terrain beneath it, as well as replicas of the Jewish Temple based on the information available in his time, and benefitting from his architectural knowledge.

Schick's monograph on the Temple Mount, Die Stiftshütte ("The Tabernacle"), is primarily a commentary on his models.

== Temple Mount (Haram) models ==
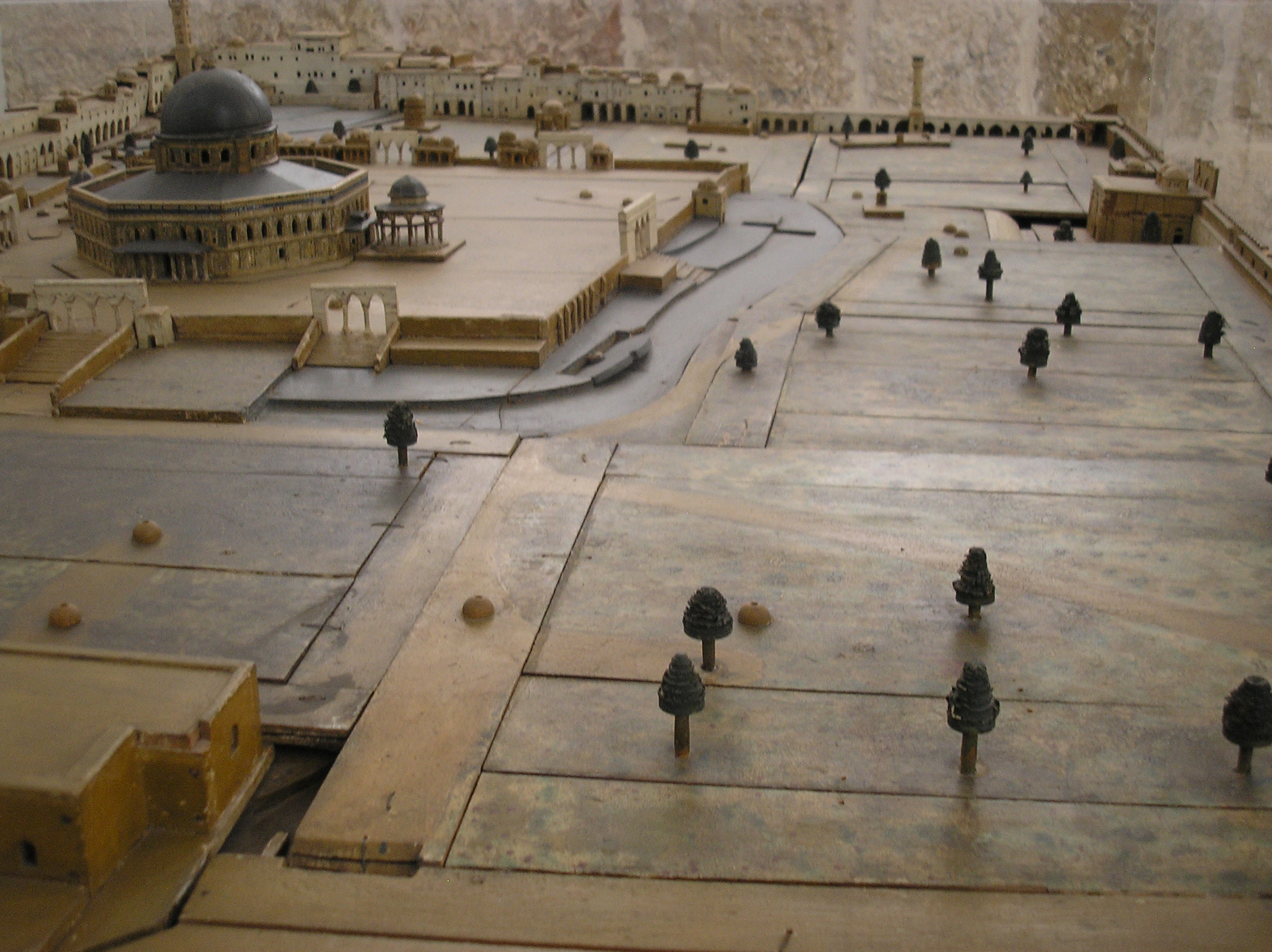
At Paulus-Haus, Jerusalem

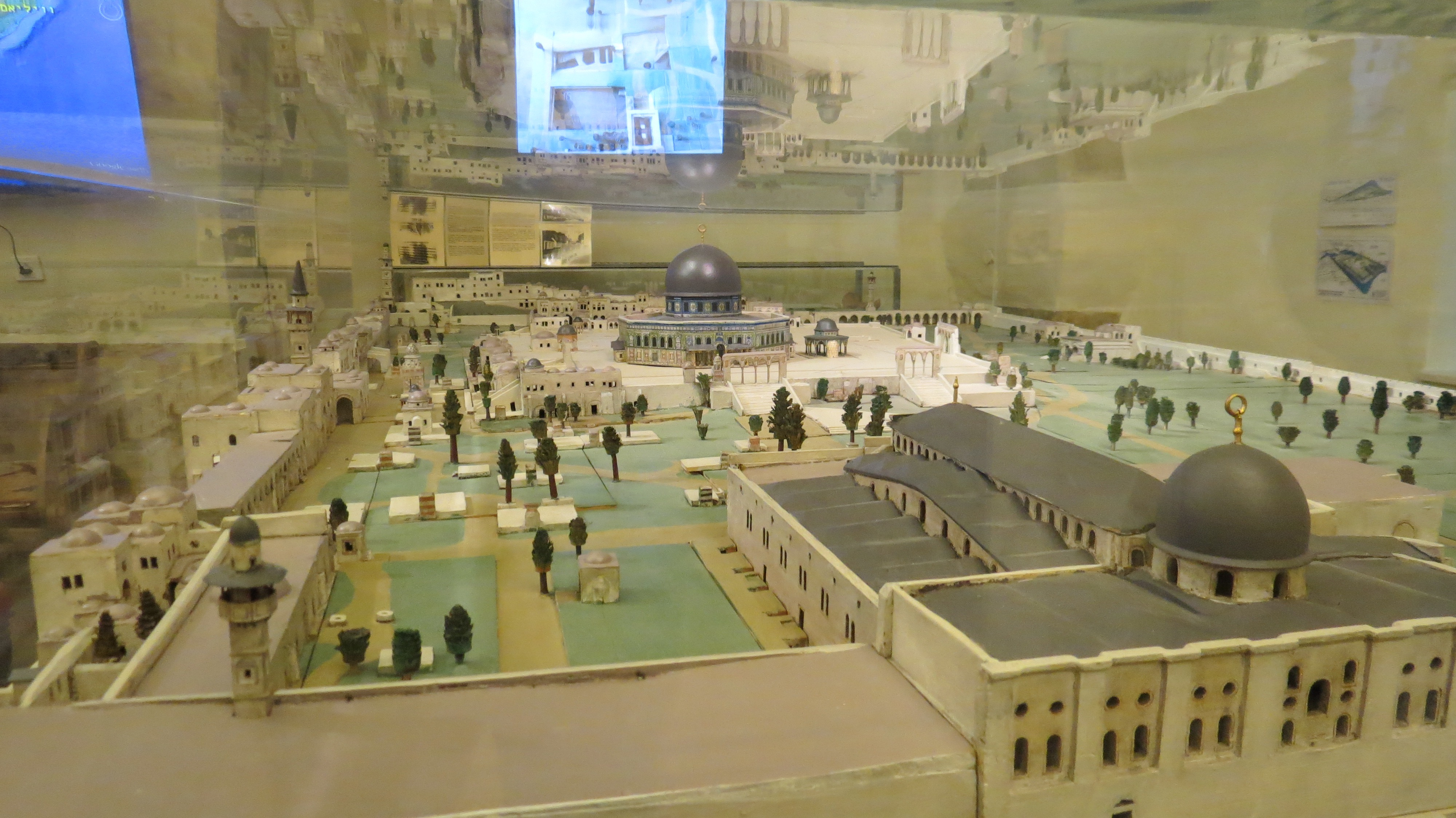
At Christ Church, Jerusalem

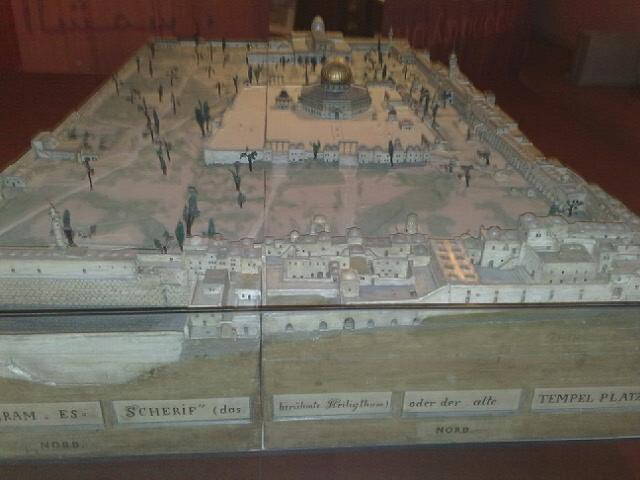
At the Bijbels Museum, Amsterdam

Schick's most notable models were of the Temple Mount, which he described as the Haram. Schick's models of the area, particularly of the foundations of the platform, are important to scholars of the area, because Schick was the last European in modern history to be allowed to carry out an archaeological survey of the subterranean spaces beneath the buildings of Al-Aqsa. Archaeology or surveying has rarely been permitted in the Temple Mount area, due to religious sensitivities. Only four such surveys of the area as a whole are known from modern times; those of Charles William Wilson, Charles Warren, Claude Reignier Conder, and Conrad Schick, with Schick's access being the most recent and with the broadest access. Schick's access was unique, because he was working to build his model for the Ottoman government during a period in which structural repairs were being made; the models were procured for and exhibited in the Turkish pavilion at the Vienna World Exposition of 1873, alongside the Illés Relief.

The first two models were made for the 1873 World's Fair; the smaller initial model likely as part of the competition to win the contract from the Ottoman authorities. The exhibited model, measuring 4 by 3 meters, was visited in Jerusalem by several crowned heads of state and toured the United Kingdom after the World's Fair, but did not find a buyer. It was housed at the Theologisches Seminar St. Chrischona near Basel, Switzerland, for 138 years, until 2012 when it was purchased by Christ Church in the Old City of Jerusalem.

Schick built further replicas of the Temple Mount for the Ottoman Sultan in 1885. This final model, in four sections, each representing the Temple Mount as it appeared in a particular era, was exhibited at the 1904 Louisiana Purchase Exposition. Two of these models are located in the basement of the Paulus-Haus museum on Nablus Road, just outside the Old City of Jerusalem near the Damascus Gate, and a third is in Museum Catharijneconvent in the Netherlands.

Date	Subject	Size (cm)	Scale	Number made	Current location
1872–3?	Temple Mount	82 × 48 × 9.5	?	?	Palestine Exploration Fund, London
1873	Temple Mount	400 x 300	1:200	one	Christ Church, Jerusalem (previously at St Chrischona Mission)
1885	Temple Mount (in various periods)	260 × 168	1:200	at least four, three are still known	one in Museum Catharijneconvent, Utrecht; two in Paulus-Haus, Jerusalem

== Jerusalem topography models ==
Date	Subject	Size (cm)	Scale	Number made	Current location
1865	Altmüller's second model of Jerusalem	25.5 × 32.7	1:21,600	many copies	various
1871	Topography of Jerusalem	65 × 91.5 x 23	1:2,500 (1:1,250 vertical)	one?	unknown
1895	Topography of Jerusalem	85 × 99	1:2,500	?	German Protestant Institute, Jerusalem

== Individual building models ==
=== Tabernacle ===
Date	Scale	Number made	Current location
c. 1845	1:20	one	unknown
1862/3	1:18	several?	unknown

=== Church of the Holy Sepulchre ===
Date	Size (cm)	Scale	Number made	Current location
1862/3	132 × 175	1:96	at least four	Christ Church, Jerusalem
1896	78 × 137	1:200	at least two	German Evangelical Institute, Jerusalem

=== Dome of the Rock ===
One model of the Dome of the Rock, made for the 1873 world's fair. Originally at the St Chrischona Mission, it was sold to an unknown buyer in 2013 for £242,000.

Date	Scale	Number made	Current location
1873	1:50	one	unknown

=== Church of the Nativity ===
Model of the Church of the Nativity

Date	Scale	Number made	Current location
1874	1:70	?	unknown

=== Christ Church ===
Date	Size (cm)	Scale	Number made	Current location
1870–1875	91.5 × 94	?	one	Christ Church, Jerusalem

== Bibliography ==
- al-Jubeh, Nazmi (2016). "Conrad Schick: Pioneering Architect, Archaeologist, and Historian of Nineteenth-Century Jerusalem" (PDF). Jerusalem Quarterly. 67. doi:10.70190/jq.I67.p7.
- Gibson, Shimon; Jacobson, David M. (1994). "The Oldest Datable Chambers on the Temple Mount in Jerusalem". The Biblical Archaeologist. 57 (3). University of Chicago Press: 150–160. doi:10.2307/3210410. ISSN 0006-0895. JSTOR 3210410. S2CID 164027682.
- Gibson, S.; Jacobson, D.M. (1996). Below the Temple Mount in Jerusalem: A Sourcebook on the Cisterns, Subterranean Chambers and Conduits of the Ḥaram Al-Sharīf. BAR international series. Tempus Reparatum. ISBN 978-0-86054-820-1.
- Gibson, Shimon (2000). "Conrad Schick (1822–1901), the Palestine Exploration Fund and an 'Archaic Hebrew' Inscription from Jerusalem". Palestine Exploration Quarterly. 132 (2). Informa UK Limited: 113–122. doi:10.1179/peq.2000.132.2.113. ISSN 0031-0328. S2CID 206860668.
- Goren, Haim; Rubin, Rehav (1996). "Conrad Schick's Models of Jerusalem and its Monuments". Palestine Exploration Quarterly. 128 (2). Informa UK Limited: 103–124. doi:10.1179/peq.1996.128.2.103. ISSN 0031-0328.
- Magouliotis, Nikolaos (26 March 2021). "Miniaturizing monuments: Conrad Schick and his architectural models of the holy sites of Jerusalem". ABE Journal (18). OpenEdition. doi:10.4000/abe.10216. ISSN 2275-6639. S2CID 234875933.
- Rubin, Rehav (2006). "Relief Maps and Models in the Archives of The Palestine Exploration Fund in London". Palestine Exploration Quarterly. 138 (1). Informa UK Limited: 43–63. doi:10.1179/003103205x63016. ISSN 0031-0328. S2CID 161738616.
- Schick, Conrad (1896). Die Stiftshütte, der Tempel in Jerusalem und der Tempelplatz der Jetztzeit (in German). Weidmann.
- Zschokke, Heinrich (1874). "Palästina auf der Weltausstellung in Wien 1873 [Palestine at the World's Fair in Vienna in 1873]". Das Heilige Land (in German). Vol. 18. Dt. Verein vom Heiligen Lande.
