= Paulus-Haus =

Coordinates: 31.7830577°N 35.2300614°E

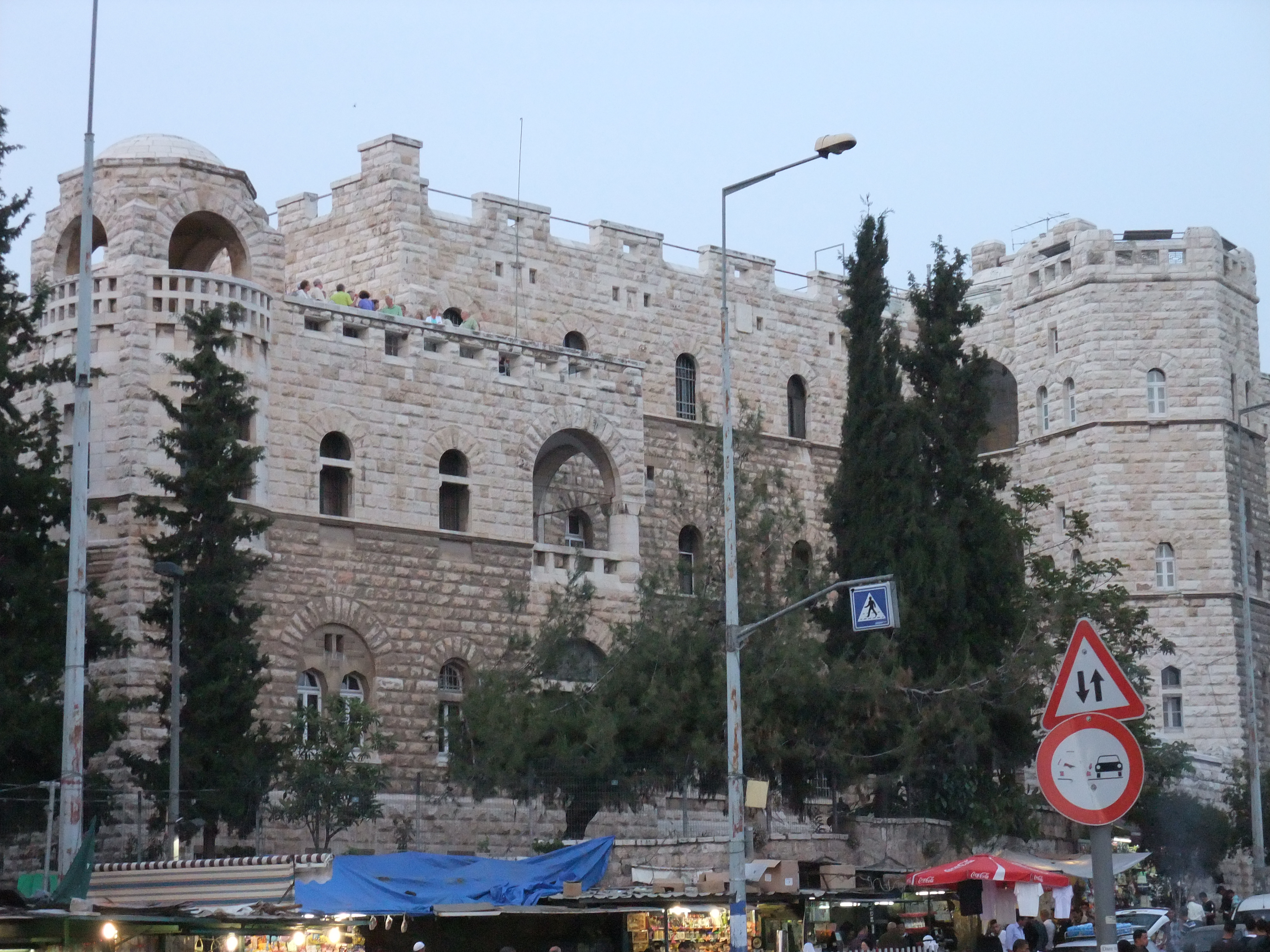
Paulus-Haus, Jerusalem

The Paulus-Haus is a pilgrim hospice in Jerusalem under the care of the German Association of the Holy Land. It is situated on the Nablus Road in the Eastern part of the modern city, directly opposite the Damascus Gate of the Old City. The monumental architecture is reminiscent of the crusader castles.

== History ==
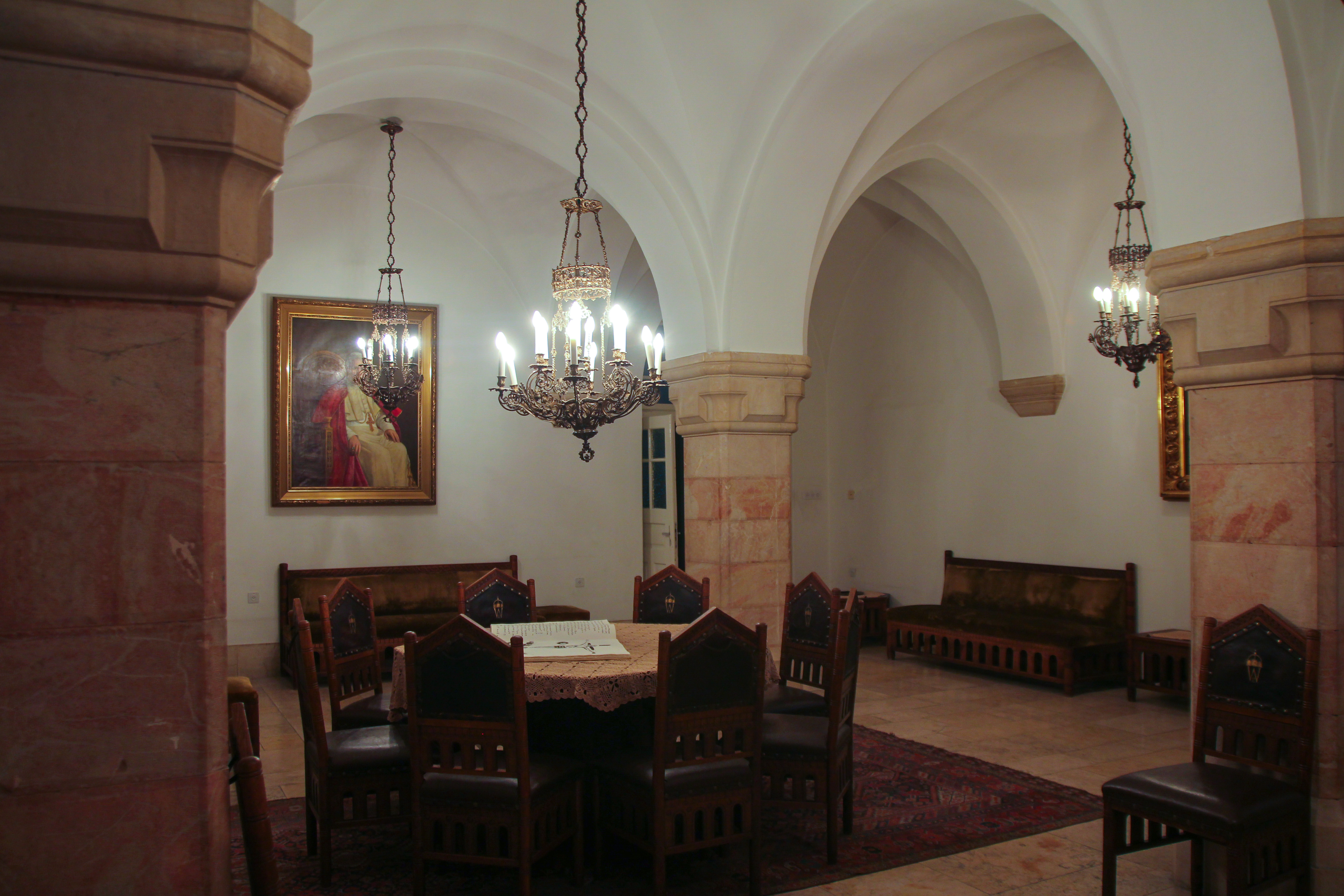
Paulus-Haus Kaisersaal

=== Ottoman period ===
At the end of the 19th century, there were already numerous Germans going on organised pilgrimages to Jerusalem, some offered by the German Association of the Holy Land, founded in 1895 through a merger between the Association of the Holy Grave (est. 1885) and the Palestine Union of the German Catholics. Since 1866 there has been a small guest house for German pilgrims on a street leading to the Jaffa Gate. At a meeting with the German Kaiser Wilhelm II during his travels through Palestine in 1898, the German Lazarist, Friedrich Wilhelm Schmidt, suggested building a new, bigger and more suitable accommodation for pilgrims. The Kaiser had already supported the construction of the Lutheran Church of the Redeemer and the establishing of the Benedictine Abbey of the Dormition on Mount Zion. With his support, the German Association of the Holy Land successfully acquired two parcels in the immediate vicinity of the Damascus Gate in 1899. The pilgrim hospice project was taken on by the architect of the Roman Catholic Archdiocese of Cologne, Henrich Renard, who was also responsible for building the Abbey of the Dormition and the Dormitio Church on Mount Zion at the same time. The first foundation stone was laid on 20 March 1904. In 1908 the Saint Paul Hospice was opened and entrusted to the Catholic Sisters of St. Carl Borromaeus. It offered space for approximately 160 guests and it quickly became a much beloved place among German pilgrims on their way to Jerusalem.

Due to the outbreak of the First World War and the consequent halting of organised pilgrimages, the Paulus-Haus was closed and for a short time used as a headquarters and recuperation facility for German soldiers.

=== British period ===
After the collapse of the Ottoman Empire, Jerusalem came under the control of the British Mandate of Palestine and became the seat of the high commissioner and the mandate administration. The Paulus-Haus was seized by the British Armed Forces and used as a general consulate until 1948. When the British mandate ended, the building was returned to the German Association of the Holy Land.

=== Jordanian period ===
As a result of the division of Jerusalem after the Palestine War, the Paulus-Haus found itself in the Jordanian section of Jerusalem. Due to the military action, the activity of the Schmidt's Girls College was interrupted and the school, housed since 1886 in the Old Hospice on what is today Hillel Street in Israeli West Jerusalem, was first moved into the Paulus-Haus in 1950, and into a newly constructed building adjacent to it in 1967.

=== Israeli period ===
Since 1967, the Paulus-Haus has resumed its role as a pilgrim accommodation and from 1989 onwards, along with the Schmidt's Girls College, has been entrusted to the international convent of the Sisters of the Congregation of Jesus.

== Layout ==
=== Emperor's Chamber ===
The Kaisersaal (Emperor's Chamber) in Paulus-Haus has been preserved with its original layout and donated furniture from the time of Kaiser Wilhelm II.

=== Museum ===
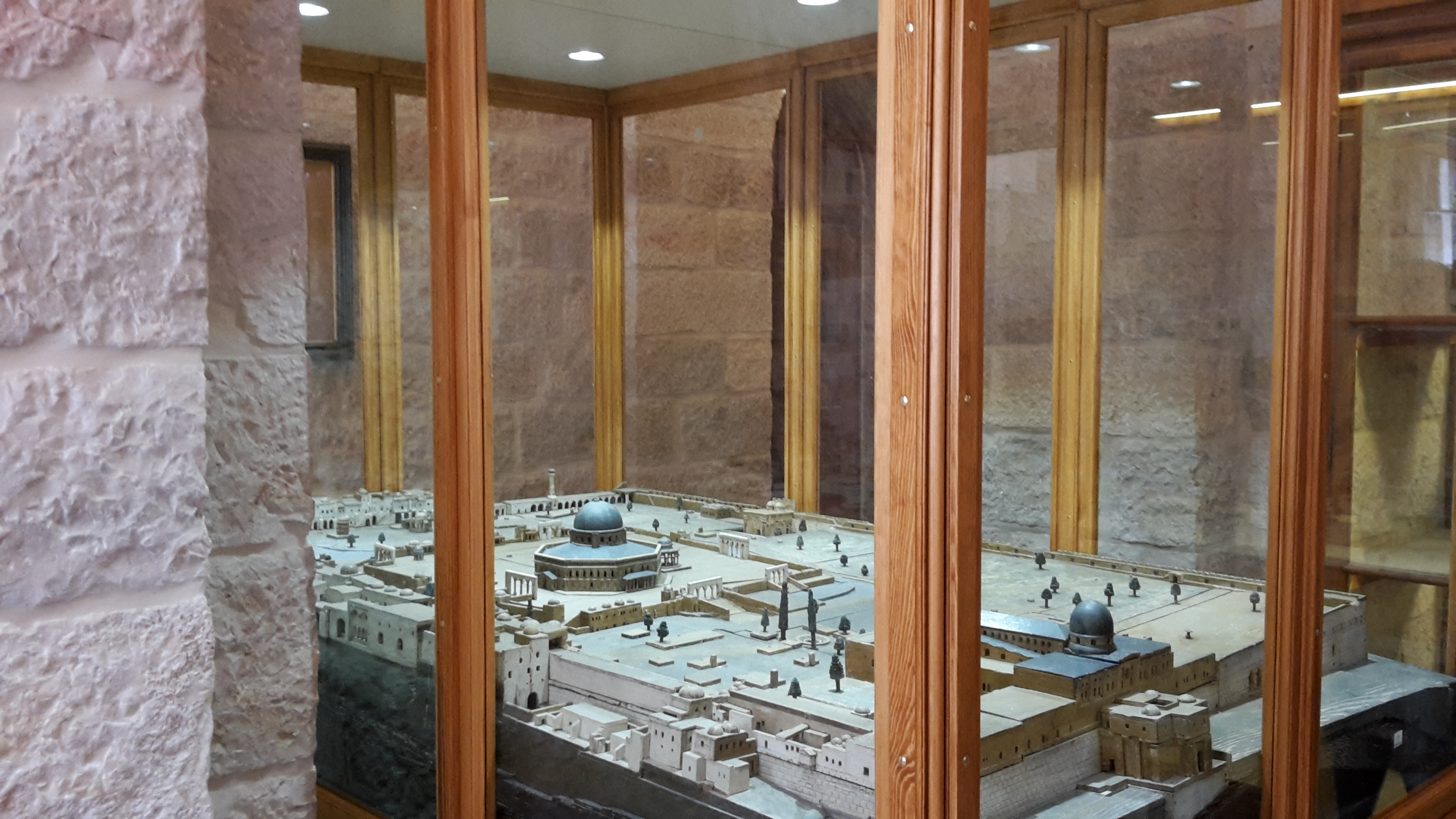
Paulus-Haus Museum, Temple Mount model by Conrad Schick

The museum of the German Association of the Holy Land has two archaeological finds from the time of Jesus on display, as well as items connected to the history of the Association and two models of the Temple Mount, one representing Conrad Schick's reconstruction of the Herodian Temple, and one of the Muslim Haram ash-Sharif. The museum was opened at the beginning of the 1990s in the basement of the Paulus-Haus.

=== Rooftop terrace ===
The rooftop terrace offers a sweeping view over the Old City of Jerusalem between the Mount of Olives, Temple Mount, Mount Zion and the Church of the Holy Sepulchre.

== Schmidt's Girls College ==
The Schmidt's Girls College is a German international school for Christian and Muslim girls. It was founded in 1885 and provides primary and secondary education to approximately 500 pupils.
