= Khirbet Minya =

8th-century Islamic palace in Israel

- Ayn Minyat Hisham (Ar.), Hurvat Minim (Heb.)
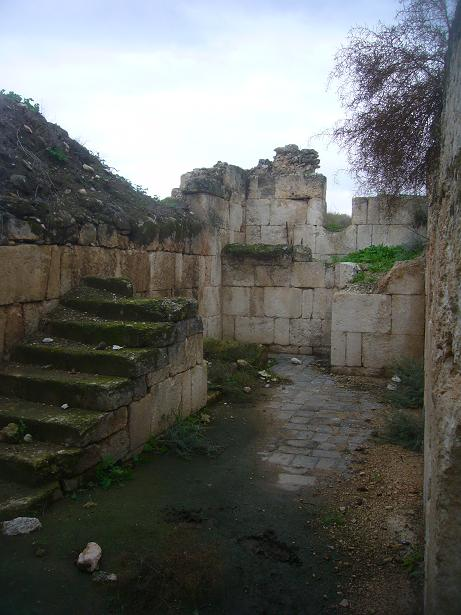
- Ruins of the Minya palace, 2009

- Location within Israel
- 32.864884°N 35.536223°E
- Type: qasr-type palace
- Grid position: 200/252 PAL

History
- Built: 8th century
- Built by: Umayyad ruler
- Abandoned: 8th century, later reused

Site notes
- Public access: Yes

Khirbet Minya, also known as Qasr al-Minya (Arabic: قصر المنية) or Ayn Minyat Hisham in Arabic and Horvat/Hurvat Minnim in Hebrew, is an Umayyad-built qasr (palace) in eastern Galilee, Israel, about 200 meters (660 ft) west of the northern end of Lake Tiberias. It was erected as a qasr complex, with a palace, mosque, and bath built by a single patron.

== Name ==
The name Khirbet Minya, as it is widely known from English-language academic literature, is derived from the Arabic name Khirbet el-Minya or Khirbat al-Minya, depending on the transliteration convention used. It means "Ruins of Minya".

== History ==
=== Umayyad construction ===
Khirbet Minya was likely built during the reign of the Umayyad caliph al-Walid I (705-715 CE) and an inscription on a stone found at the site mentions his name. The supposed patron of the palace was al-Walid's son, Umar ibn al-Walid, who served as the governor of Tiberias during his father's reign, but fell out of favour when his uncle Sulayman ibn Abd al-Malik became caliph in 715. This makes the palace's mosque one of the earliest to be built in Palestine.

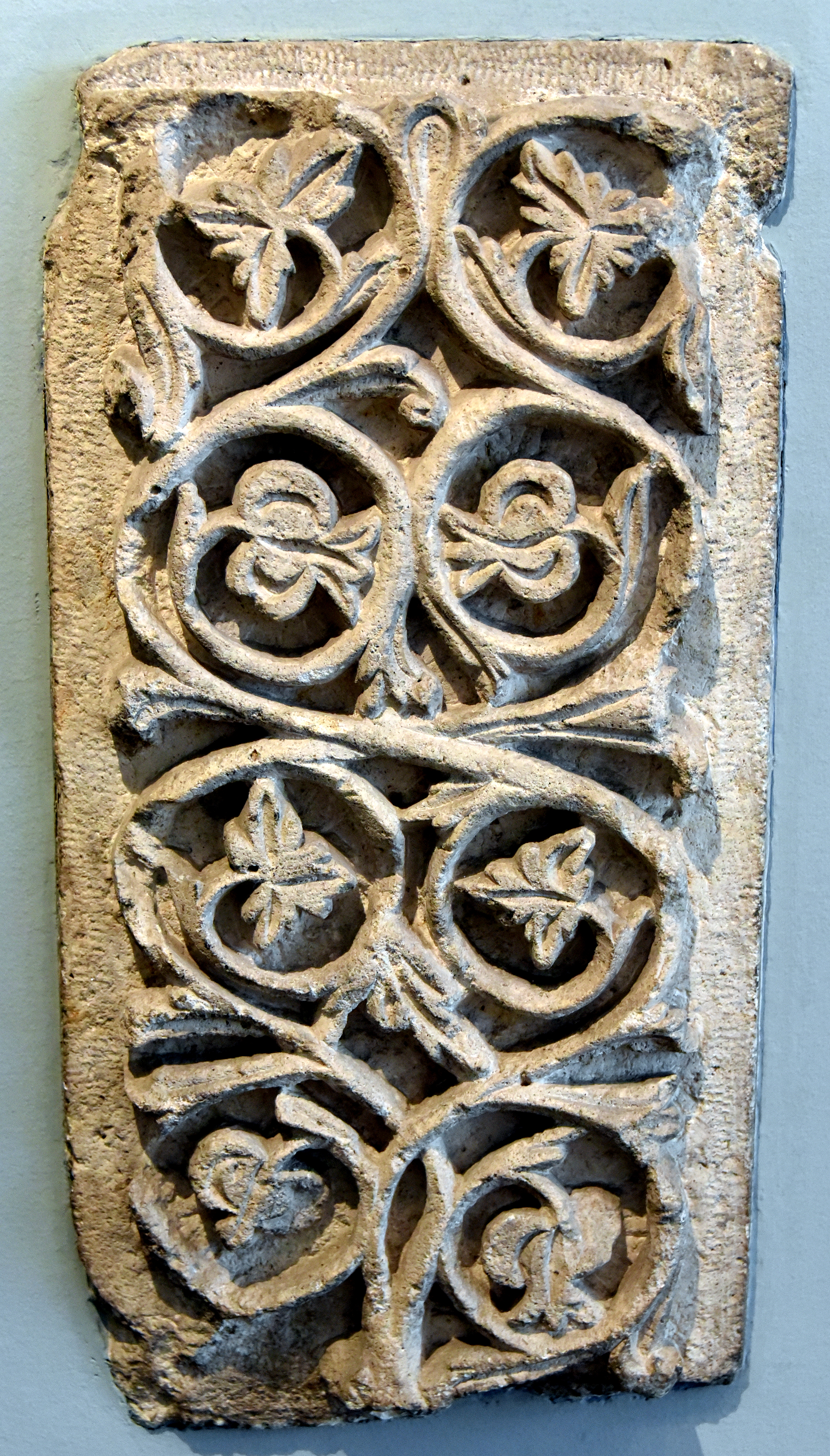
Wall architectural decoration from Khirbat al-Minya, Israel, 705-715 CE. Pergamon Museum

Khirbat al-Minya served as a local administrative center for a subregion of the Jund al-Urdunn ("District of Jordan") and as a contact point for 'Umar and local Arab tribes. It may also have served as a caravanserai for merchants travelling along the Sea of Galilee or northeast from the lake shore to the coast, as a winter retreat for the governor of Tiberias or a summer retreat for the governor at Baysan.

There is evidence that the palace was in use until at least the end of the Umayyad period in 750 CE. The 749 Galilee earthquake damaged the building, causing a rift to run through the eastern wing straight through the mosque's mihrab. The damage was never repaired. It thus remains uncertain whether the palace was ever finished: Fallen debris from the earthquake was discovered in the 20th century in situ on the floor tiles of the main entry. The unused raw materials of a mosaic builder were found in the antechamber of the mosque.

Khirbat al-Minya was abandoned at an uncertain date.

=== Mamluk reuse, khan ===
Khirbat al-Minya was later temporarily resettled.

Based on the stratification established in the western part of the site and the discovery of Mamluk pottery in 1959, the palace was settled again during the late Mamluk period (14th-15th centuries). It is likely that the building was used as a khan in this period, due to its position at a cross-road between the main Damascus-Cairo route, dubbed "Via Maris" in modern times, and a secondary route to Safad via Khan Jubb Yusuf. A Khan al-Minya was constructed 300 m due north of the palace by Saif al-Din Tankiz (reigned 1312–1340), the Mamluk governor of Syria, during the reign of Al-Nasir Muhammad. Parts of Khirbat al-Minya might have been used as building material for the new khan; baked bricks and a marble capital found during excavations of the khan were assumed to be taken from the palace.

=== Ottoman period village ===
In 1596 a village by the name of Mina (Minya) appeared in the Ottoman tax registers as part of the nahiya (subdistrict) of Jira in the Sanjak (district) of Safad. It had an all-Muslim population, consisting of 110 households and 2 bachelors, all Muslim. They paid a fixed tax rate of 25% on agricultural products, such as wheat, barley, vegetable and fruit garden, orchard, special products, beehives, water buffaloes, in addition to occasional revenues, marked toll and a water mill; totalling 26,476 akçe. All of the revenue went to a waqf for Madrasa Tahiriyya (com) in Quds Sarif.

Parts of the ruin were used as a water reservoir (likely for a mill) and later a large brick oven was built in the south wing and used to process sugar cane from nearby plantations. In the 19th century locals built huts on the rubble heaps.

=== Rediscovery and excavations ===
In the second half of the 19th century, Charles William Wilson and other European travellers discovered ancient ruins among the huts of a local fellah settlement. Some thought it to be Capernaum where, according to the New Testament, Jesus had taught at the local synagogue. This was likely an argument for the purchase of the area along with nearby Tell el-Oreme ('Oreimeh), by the Deutscher Verein vom Heiligen Lande (German Association of the Holy Land), a Catholic society from Germany, in 1895.

==== Pre-WW II excavations ====
After the true Capernaum synagogue was discovered in 1904, de:Andreas Evaristus Mader (1881–1949), an archaeologist and Salvatorian patre, conducted exploratory excavations at the ruin and its environments on behalf of the Görres Society in 1911-4 and again in 1931. Identifying a large square structure with outer walls and corner towers, he thought it to be a Roman fort or castrum.

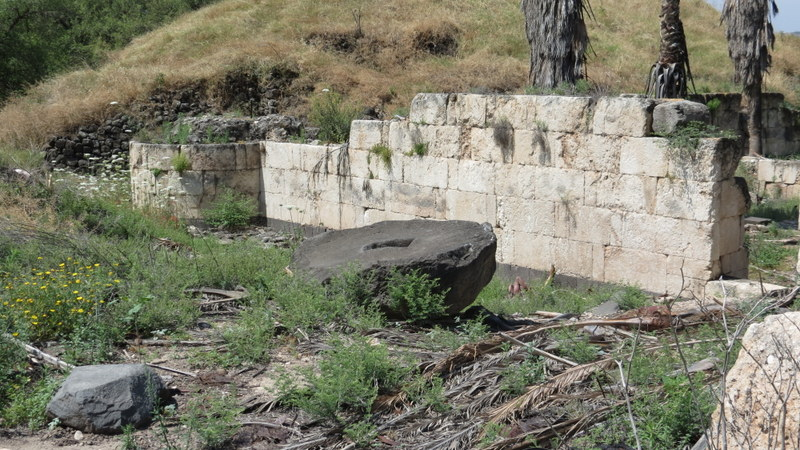
A section of a wall from Minya palace

This was corrected by further work by Alfons Maria Schneider and Oswin Puttrich-Reignard in 1932–9. The outbreak of World War II terminated German archaeological work in Palestine. At that point, Schneider and Puttrich-Reignard had excavated about half of the palace and published some of their findings. By 1937, they had uncovered the mosque and it had become obvious that the building was an early Islamic palace. The findings were evenly distributed between the Museum für Islamische Kunst at Berlin and the Palestine Archaeological Museum in Jerusalem (today the Rockefeller Museum). Whilst most of the findings left in Palestine have today been lost, the Berlin pieces remain in the care of the Prussian Cultural Heritage Foundation, and some of them are exhibited in the museum's permanent exhibition. The notes and drawings from the excavations are likewise kept in Berlin and have been the subject of recent studies by archaeologists from the universities of Berlin and Bamberg.

==== Post-1948 excavations ====
During July–August 1959, the western section of the palace was excavated by O. Grabar in collaboration with the Israel Antiquities Authority (IAA). In 1960 the site was excavated by an Israeli-American expedition, intending to refine the chronology and the plan of the palace. Several rescue digs were later conducted by the IAA in the environs of the palace, revealing a bath from late antiquity/Early Islamic times (1963), a medieval caravanserai (1988) and the remains of a medieval settlement between the palace and the lake (2011).

With the rapprochement between Israel and Germany in the 1960s, the Verein was reinstated as owner, but it handed over its rights to the palace itself to the Israel Nature and Parks Authority, which awarded the area protected status as a listed monument and has since been responsible for the palace's upkeep.

==== UNESCO application and decay ====
In 2000, it was proposed that "Horvat Minnim" should become a World Heritage Site.

In 2001, a study by the Getty Conservation Institute found severe structural damage to the ruin, caused by the climate and by vegetation. A lack of funds has since prevented countermeasures as well as investment in making the area more accessible to visitors.

== Architecture ==
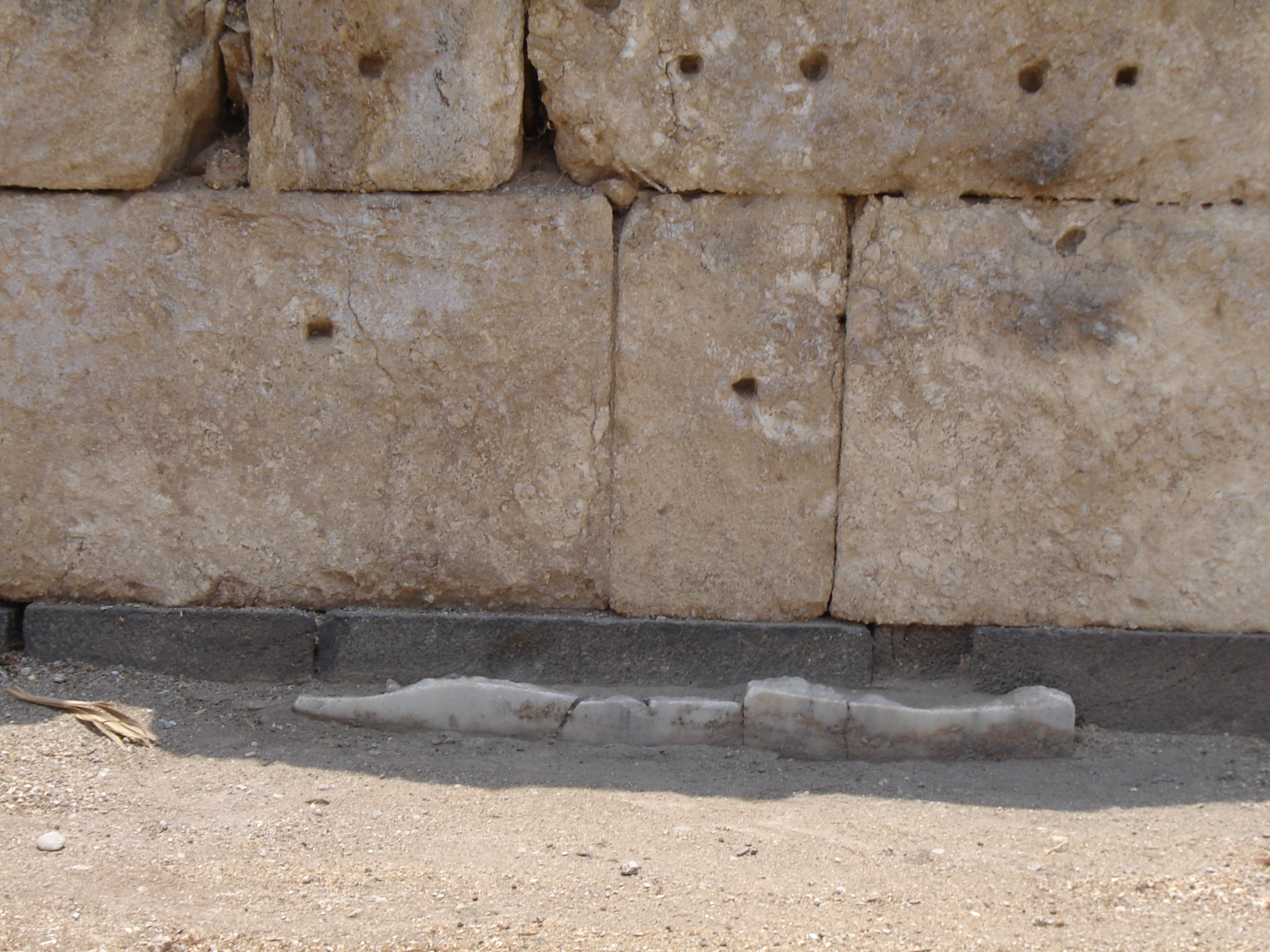
The base of Khirbat al-Minya, showing the limestone blocks laid over a lower course of black basalt stones

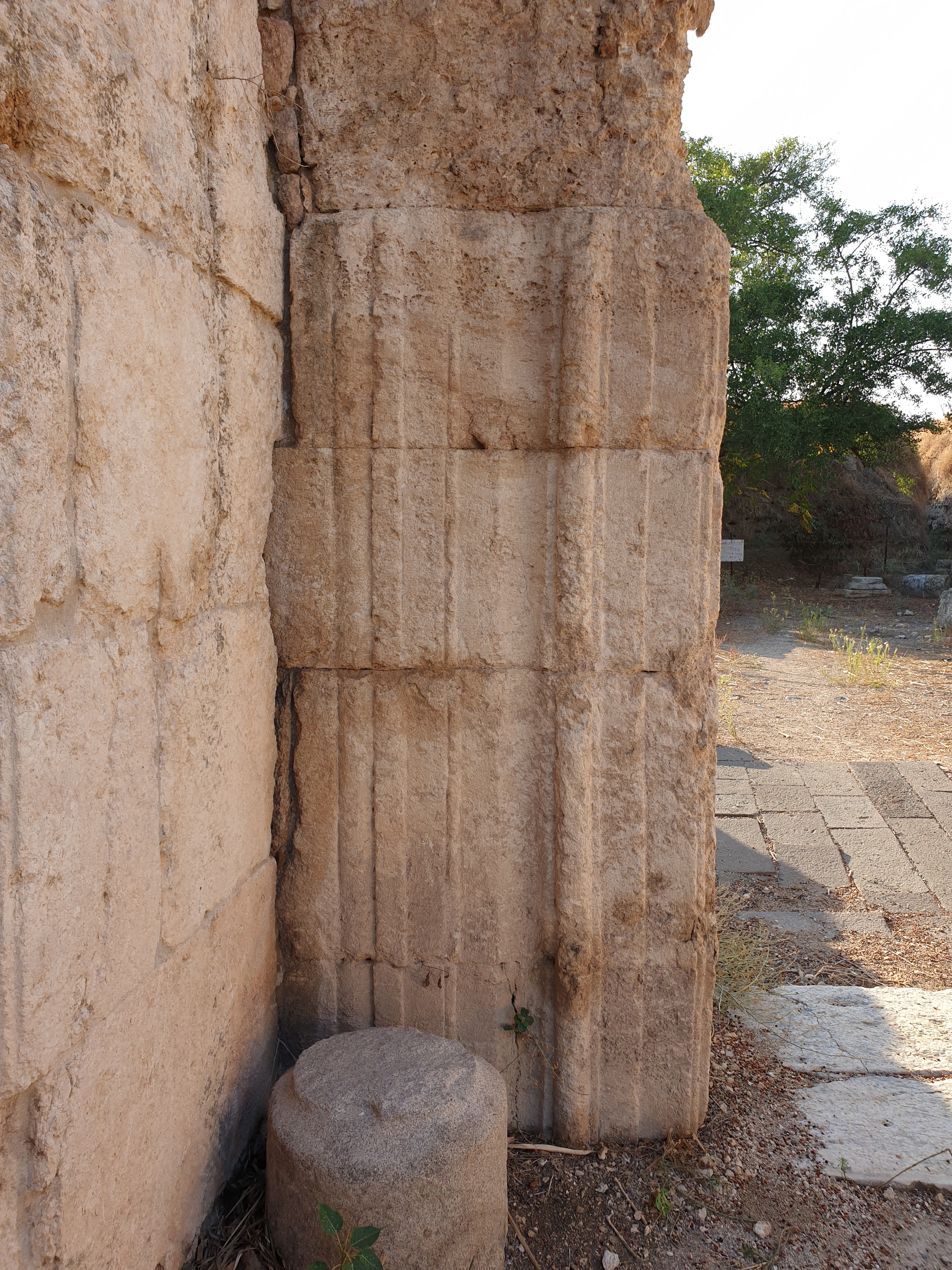
The entrance

=== Enclosure walls and gate ===
The palace of Khirbat al-Minya is contained within an irregular rectangular enclosure (66 by 73 meters) oriented north–south, facing the four cardinal points. Like other Umayyad palaces it has round towers at its corners and semi-circular towers in the middle of each wall except the eastern wall where a monumental entrance was located. The main gate in the middle of the eastern wall is formed by two projecting half-round towers separated by the arch of the gateway.

=== Throne room, mosque, bath, living quarters ===
The centre of the structure is occupied by a colonnaded courtyard with twin staircases giving access to an upper floor level. The rooms which surrounded the courtyard differ in size and arrangement and included a mosque, numerous rooms with mosaics, and a throne room.

The mosque is located in the southeastern corner and is divided into twelve bays supported on piers. Next to the mosque is a triple-aisled basilica hall. Like other Umayyad desert or country palaces, such as Qasr al-Heer al-Gharbi in the Syrian Desert and Khirbat al-Mafjar near Jericho, Khirbat al-Minya followed the Umayyad model of a five-room bait ("house"), flanking the basilica hall. To the north are the residential quarters.

=== Masonry and decoration ===
The building is constructed of finely dressed limestone blocks laid in regular courses with a lower course of black basalt stones. The mosque had a simple decoration, but the domed gateway chamber and the southern rooms were richly decorated. The top of the walls were decorated with large stepped merlons and the interior was decorated with a variety of glass and stone mosaics. Marble panels covered the dadoes of the walls and stone mosaics combined with glass cubes were set in geometric carpet-like patterns on the floors of the five southern rooms. A well-preserved floor mosaic has been discovered in the western part of the palace. Based on the foundations of the gate house, parts of the palace were at least 15 metres high.

== Today ==
The Israel Nature and Park Authority has erected a sign at the site which states that the protected monument was an Early Islamic palace built by Al-Walid I or Al-Walid II. In 2012, the Institute for Prehistory and Early History of the University of Mainz, in cooperation with the Deutscher Verein vom Heiligen Lande, presented a plan to the Israeli authorities. A guide was published and with financial support from the German Foreign Ministry, and the university is currently working with the Israel Nature and Parks Authority and the Israel Antiquities Authority to protect the masonry from further damage.

== See also ==
- Barid, Muslim postal network renewed during Mamluk period (roads, bridges, khans)
- Al-Sinnabra, the other Umayyad qasr on the Sea of Galilee, Israel
- Desert castles
- Early medieval domes
- Jerusalem, Temple Mount area: several possibly Umayyad palatial structures south (at the Ophel) and southwest of the Mount

== Bibliography ==
- Bloch, Franziska (2006). Hirbat al-Minya. Die unglasierte Keramik. In: Franziska Bloch, Verena Daiber, Peter Knötzele: Studien zur spätantiken und islamischen Keramik. Hirbat al-Minya – Baalbek – Resafa. Rahden / Westfalen. pp. 1–110
- Conder, C.R.; Kitchener, H.H. (1881). The Survey of Western Palestine: Memoirs of the Topography, Orography, Hydrography, and Archaeology. Vol. 1. London: Committee of the Palestine Exploration Fund. (p.369, p.394, p.403-p.404)
- Enderlein, Volkmar (2000). M. Hattstein and P.Delius (ed.). Building decoration: Islam: Art and Architecture. Cologne: Konemann..
- Grabar, O.; Perrot, J.; Ravani, B.; Rosen, M. (2005). "Sondages à Khirbet el-Minyeh". Early Islamic Art, 650-1100 (in French). Vol. I, Constructing the Study of Islamic Art. Hampshire: Ashgate Publishing. Archived from the original on 2011-06-04. Originally published by Israel Exploration Journal, 10 (1960), pp. 226–43.
- Guérin, V. (1880). Description Géographique Historique et Archéologique de la Palestine (in French). Vol. 3: Galilee, pt. 1. Paris: L'Imprimerie Nationale.
- Hütteroth, W.-D.; Abdulfattah, K. (1977). Historical Geography of Palestine, Transjordan and Southern Syria in the Late 16th Century. Erlanger Geographische Arbeiten, Sonderband 5. Erlangen, Germany: Vorstand der Fränkischen Geographischen Gesellschaft. ISBN 3-920405-41-2.
- Khalidi, W. (1992). All That Remains: The Palestinian Villages Occupied and Depopulated by Israel in 1948. Washington D.C.: Institute for Palestine Studies. ISBN 0-88728-224-5.
- Kuhnen, Hans-Peter; Bloch, Franziska (2014). Kalifenzeit am See Genezareth - der Palast von Khirbat al-Minya (German/English). Nünnerich-Asmus Verlag & Media GmbH. ISBN 978-3943904758.
- Oliphant, L. (1887). Haifa, or Life in Modern Palestine. Edinburgh: Blackwood.
- Petersen, Andrew (2001). A Gazetteer of Buildings in Muslim Palestine (British Academy Monographs in Archaeology). Vol. 1. Oxford University Press. ISBN 978-0-19-727011-0. Archived from the original on 2021-05-28.
- Puttrich-Reignard, O. (1938). "Die Ergebnisse der dritten und vierten Ausgrabungskampagne auf Chirbet el Minje bei Tabgha". Amtliche Berichte aus den Preuszischen Kunstsammlungen. 59. Berlin: 80–84. Cited in Petersen (2001).
- Puttrich-Reignard, O. (1939). "Die Palastanlage von Chirbet el Minje". Palästinahefte des Deutschens Vereins vom Heilige Lande, 17-29. The German Association of the Holy Land: 9–29. Cited in Petersen (2001).
- Ritter, M. (1994). Die Baudekoration des umayyadischen Palastes Ḫirbat al-Minya am See Genezareth. MA thesis University of Bamberg.
- Ritter, M. (2012). Umayyadisches Ornament und christliche Motive: Marmorrelieffriese (Champlevé) im Palast von Ḫirbat al-Minya. In: Beiträge zur Islamischen Kunst und Archäologie, Bd. 3, eds L. Korn and A. Heidenreich, Wiesbaden: Reichert, pp. 113–137.
- Ritter, M. (2016). Umayyad Foundation Inscriptions and the Inscription of Khirbat al-Minya: Text, Usage, Visual Form. In: H.-P. Kuhnen (ed.): Khirbat al-Minya: der Umayyadenpalast am See Genezareth. Rahden / Westfalen. pp. 59–84.
- Ritter, M. (2017). Der umayyadische Palast des 8. Jahrhunderts in Ḫirbat al-Minya am See von Tiberias: Bau und Baudekor. Wiesbaden: Reichert Studien zur islamischen Kunst und Archäologie | Studies in Islamic Art and Archaeology). ISBN 978-3-89500-679-1.
- Rhode, H. (1979). Administration and Population of the Sancak of Safed in the Sixteenth Century (PhD). Columbia University. Archived from the original on 2016-10-10.
- Schneider, Alfons Maria; Puttrich-Reignard, Oswin (1937). Ein frühislamischer Bau am See Genesareth. Zwei Berichte über Grabungen auf Chirbet el-Minje (German). Köln Bachem.
- Wilson, C.W. (c. 1881). Picturesque Palestine, Sinai and Egypt. Vol. 2. New York: D. Appleton.(p.73, p.75, p.76, p.82, p.83, p.84 )
