= Dima Juma Samman =

Palestinian writer and scholar (born 1963)

- ديمة جمعة السمان
- Born: 1963 (age 61–62); Palestine
- Occupation: writer

Dima Juma Samman (Arabic: ديمة جمعة السمان; 1963), is a scholar from the State of Palestine who specializes in writing about Jerusalem. She was educated at the Schmidt's Girls College. After high school, she studied "linguistics" at Birzeit University, taking senior positions in the educational and media service, and was awarded the Adibba of the Palestinian Ministry of Culture as the Cultural Figure of Jerusalem for 2013.

== Career ==
Samman was born in Jerusalem, Al-Saman Al-Sharif in 1963, her father Adib and her mother an Arabic language teacher, who was influenced by literary work even if she was an emerging writer, Hanna Minh, Anis Mansour and Najib Mahfouz.

All her anecdotal work passed through a message about the daily reality and social and cultural life in the Palestinian interior of the reader, and was honoured with one of her novels from Palestinian and Arab institutions in 2008. She worked on press patrols in Jerusalem, including: New Week, Magazine with People, Al-Sada, Al-Maraya, published a range of literary, political, educational, analytical and critical articles and short stories. In addition, a series of critical studies have been published around her writings in a number of periodicals within the country, abroad and on web pages, and she has prepared masters and doctorates on her literature and novels, and has manuscripts awaiting publication.

== Novels ==
• (1992) Convoy: Dar Al-Huda Publications, Kafr Al-Qurr

• (1992) Lost rib: Return House for Studies and Publishing, Jerusalem

• (1992) Invisible Fingers: Publications of the Book House, Jerusalem

• (1995) Heaven Narrows Suite: Creative Publishing, or Coal

• (2005) Stork Tower – Two-Part Novel by the Egyptian General Book Authority, Cairo

• (2011) Asset Building: Egyptian Public Authority for Writers, Cairo

• (2011) Lost Journey: Soldier Publishing and Distribution House, Jerusalem

• (2012) Directed from another time: Egyptian Public Authority for Writers, Cairo

• (2015) Forgive you my heart: Soldier Publishing and Distribution House, Jerusalem

• (2018) This man I don't know: The Library of Everything in Haifa, Haifa

== Awards ==
• She received the Award for Best Written Novel on Jerusalem for 2008 on the occasion of Jerusalem, the Arab Capital of Culture, 2009, and was honored by the Meeting of Sacred Adventists in 2009, by the Hebrew University of Jerusalem and Arab institutions.

• The Palestinian Ministry of Culture granted her the title of Cultural Figure of Jerusalem for 2013.

== Position ==
• Director of the Educational Information Service of the Palestinian Ministry of Education to date.

• Director-General of the Jerusalem Affairs Unit of the Palestinian Ministry of Education and Education to date.

• Member of the General Body of the Arab Journalists Association of Palestine to date.

• Member of the governing body of the Palestinian Writers' Union to date.

• Director of the weekly Seventh Day Cultural Symposium, launched in Jerusalem in 1991.

• Editorial Director of Palestinian newspapers: The Weekly Al-Sada Newspaper, the Ministry's Educational March, the New Week Magazine, and a Magazine with the People. She also served as Editorial Secretary of the Al-Sada Newspaper, the Mraya Newspaper, all published in Palestine.

== Personal life ==
Married to Palestinian lawyer Ali Abu Hilal, they had three children: Yara, Yazan, and Rani.
