= Markus Ritter =

Markus Ritter may refer to:

- Markus Ritter (art historian)
- Markus Ritter (politician)
