= Wilhelm II's voyage to the Levant in 1898 =

Political visit of Wilhelm II of Germany to the Ottoman Empire

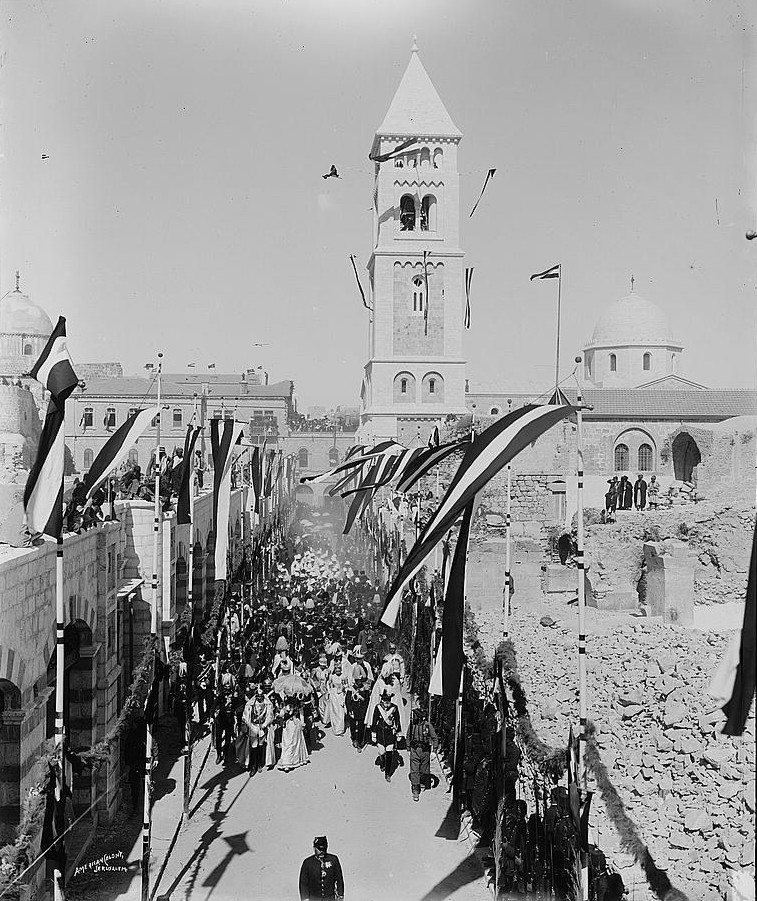
Wilhelm II and his wife Augusta Victoria (under the umbrella) lead the royal cortege past the Lutheran Church of the Redeemer, Jerusalem, which they had come to dedicate on 31 October 1898

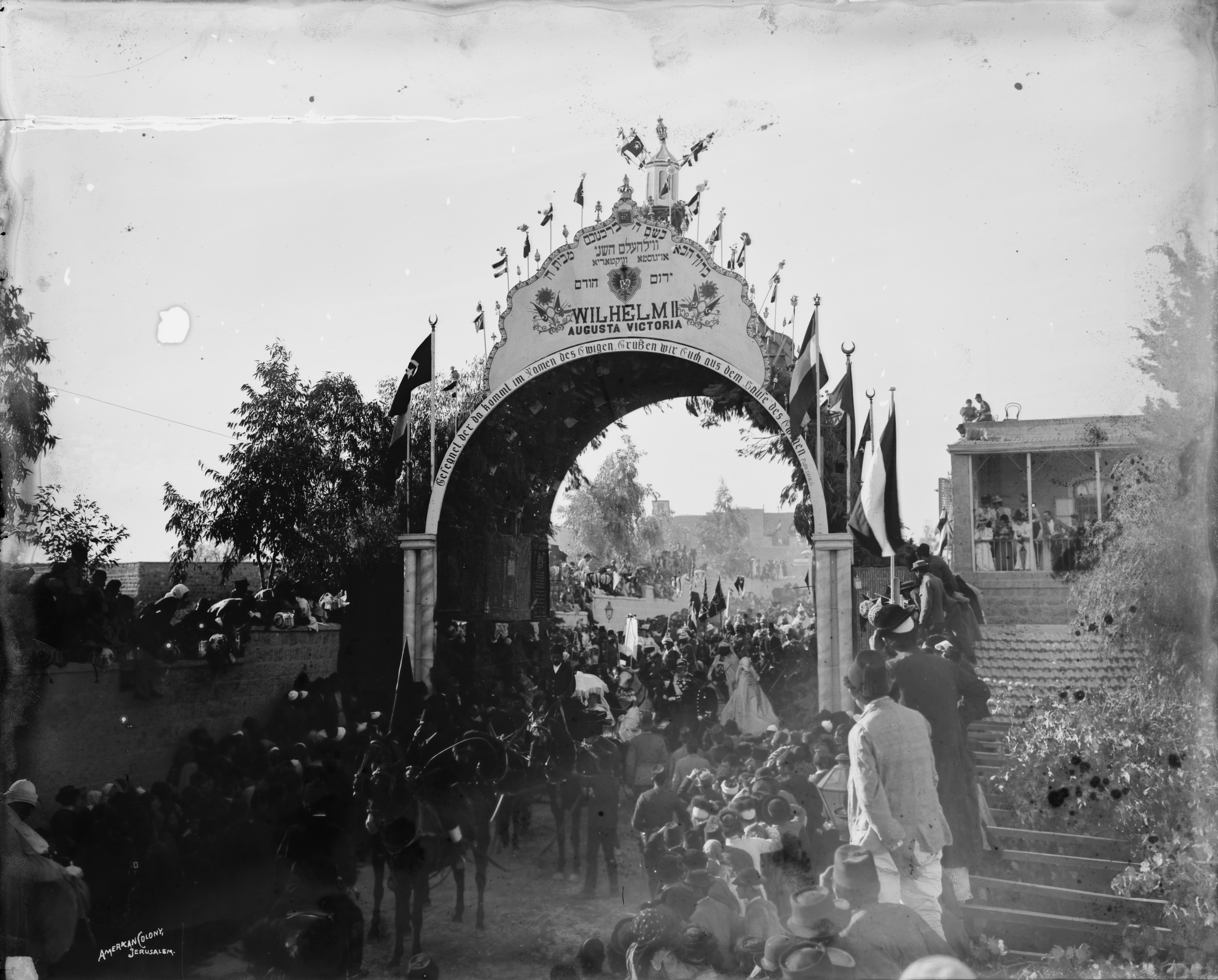
The Kaiser passing through an arch erected by the Jewish community of Jerusalem.

German Emperor Wilhelm II made a state visit to the Ottoman Empire between 25 October and 12 November 1898.

== Journey ==
The Kaiser started his journey to the Ottoman Eyalets with Istanbul on 16 October 1898; then he went by yacht to Haifa on 25 October. After visiting Jerusalem and Bethlehem, the Kaiser went back to Jaffa to embark to Beirut, where he took the train passing Aley and Zahlé to reach Damascus on 7 November. While visiting the Mausoleum of Saladin the following day, the Kaiser made a speech:

In the face of all the courtesies extended to us here, I feel that I must thank you, in my name as well as that of the Empress, for them, for the hearty reception given us in all the towns and cities we have touched, and particularly for the splendid welcome extended to us by this city of Damascus. Deeply moved by this imposing spectacle, and likewise by the consciousness of standing on the spot where held sway one of the most chivalrous rulers of all times, the great Sultan Saladin, a knight sans peur et sans reproche, who often taught his adversaries the right conception of knighthood, I seize with joy the opportunity to render thanks, above all to the Sultan Abdul Hamid for his hospitality. May the Sultan rest assured, and also the three hundred million Mohammedans scattered over the globe and revering in him their caliph, that the German Emperor will be and remain at all times their friend.

— Kaiser Wilhelm II,

On 10 November, Wilhelm went to visit Baalbek before heading to Beirut to board his ship back home on 12 November.

== German settlement in Palestine ==
His visit spurred interest in the German Templer colonies in Palestine. One of the Kaiser's traveling companions, Colonel Joseph von Ellrichshausen, initiated the formation of a society for the advancement of the German settlements in Palestine, named the Gesellschaft zur Förderung der deutschen Ansiedlungen in Palästina, in Stuttgart. It enabled the settlers to acquire land for new settlements by offering them low interest loans. Subsequently second and third-born children of the original mostly Württemberg settlers founded Wilhelma (named after William II of Württemberg, king of the homeland of the parental generation of the new settlement's dwellers, now called Bnei Atarot) in 1902 near Lod, Walhalla (1903) near the original Jaffa colony, followed by Bethlehem of Galilee (1906). The 1874 schisma within the Templer movement, followed by Protestant proselytism making some schismatic Templers join local Protestant congregations supported by national Protestant churches of the states in united Germany. The non-Templar colony of Waldheim (now Alonei Abba) was subsequently founded next to Bethlehem of Galilee in 1907 by proselytised Templers now affiliated with the Old-Prussian State Church.

== Herzl and Zionism ==
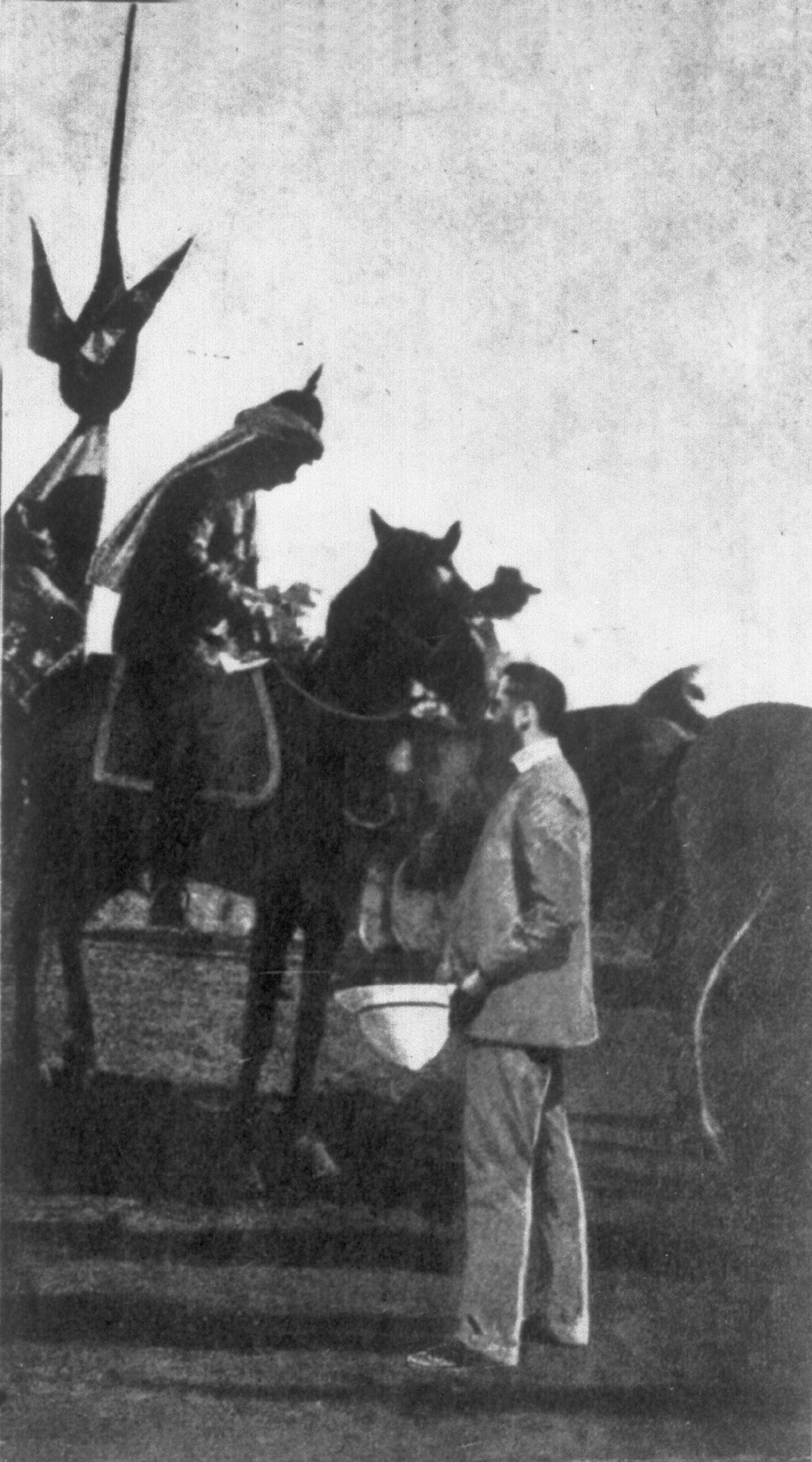
Photomontage of Herzl's brief meeting with the Kaiser, outside Mikveh Israel.

An Eastern Surprise

Important Result of the Kaiser's Tour

Sultan and Emperor Agreed in Palestine

Benevolent Sanction Given to the Zionist Movement

One of the most important results, if not the most important, of the Kaiser's visit to Palestine is the immense impetus it has given to Zionism, the movement for the return of the Jews to Palestine. The gain to this cause is the greater since it is immediate, but perhaps more important still is the wide political influence which this Imperial action is like to have.

It has not been generally reported that when the Kaiser visited Constantinople Dr. Herzl, the head of the Zionist movement, was there; again when the Kaiser entered Jerusalem he found Dr. Herzl there. These were no mere coincidences, but the visible signs of accomplished facts

— Daily Mail, 18 November 1898

The visit resulted in the highest-profile political event in the life of Theodor Herzl, considered the founder of Zionism. Through the efforts of William Hechler, via the Kaiser's uncle Frederick I, Grand Duke of Baden, Herzl publicly met Wilhelm II three times during the voyage, once in Istanbul (on 15 October 1898) and twice in Palestine (29 October and 2 November). The meetings significantly advanced Herzl's and Zionism's legitimacy in Jewish and world opinion.

During the Istanbul audience, the Kaiser asked Herzl what he wished him to ask of the Sultan: "Tell me in a word what I am to ask the Sultan," to which Herzl replied: "A Chartered Company – under German protection". The Kaiser brought the subject up twice with the Sultan; the Sultan refused, even in return for the Jews assuming the sizable Turkish foreign debt, as Zionism was highly unpopular amongst the local population in Palestine.

This was Herzl's first ever visit to Jerusalem, and was deliberately coordinated with that of Wilhelm II to secure public world recognition of himself and Zionism. Herzl and Wilhelm II first met publicly on 29 October, at Mikveh Israel, a small Rothschild-funded Jewish agricultural settlement. It was a brief but historic meeting. It was the first public acknowledgement of Herzl as the leader of the world Zionist movement by a major European power. Photographs were taken of the event but poorly positioned so that only partials of the meeting were actually recorded. A problem occurred with the photography, but a photomontage composition of the images was made later for historical and world presentation.

Herzl had a second formal, public audience with the emperor at the latter's tent camp on Street of the Prophets in Jerusalem on 2 November 1898.

At the public presentations outside of Mikveh and Jerusalem, Herzl learnt that the Kaiser's request to the Sultan had not been successful, and the Kaiser no longer had interest in Herzl or Zionism. Although Kaiser Wilhelm had backed away from supporting Herzl's project, a number of press publications positioned the meeting as momentous and successful, as some political legitimacy had been lent to Herzl and Zionism.

== Notable events ==
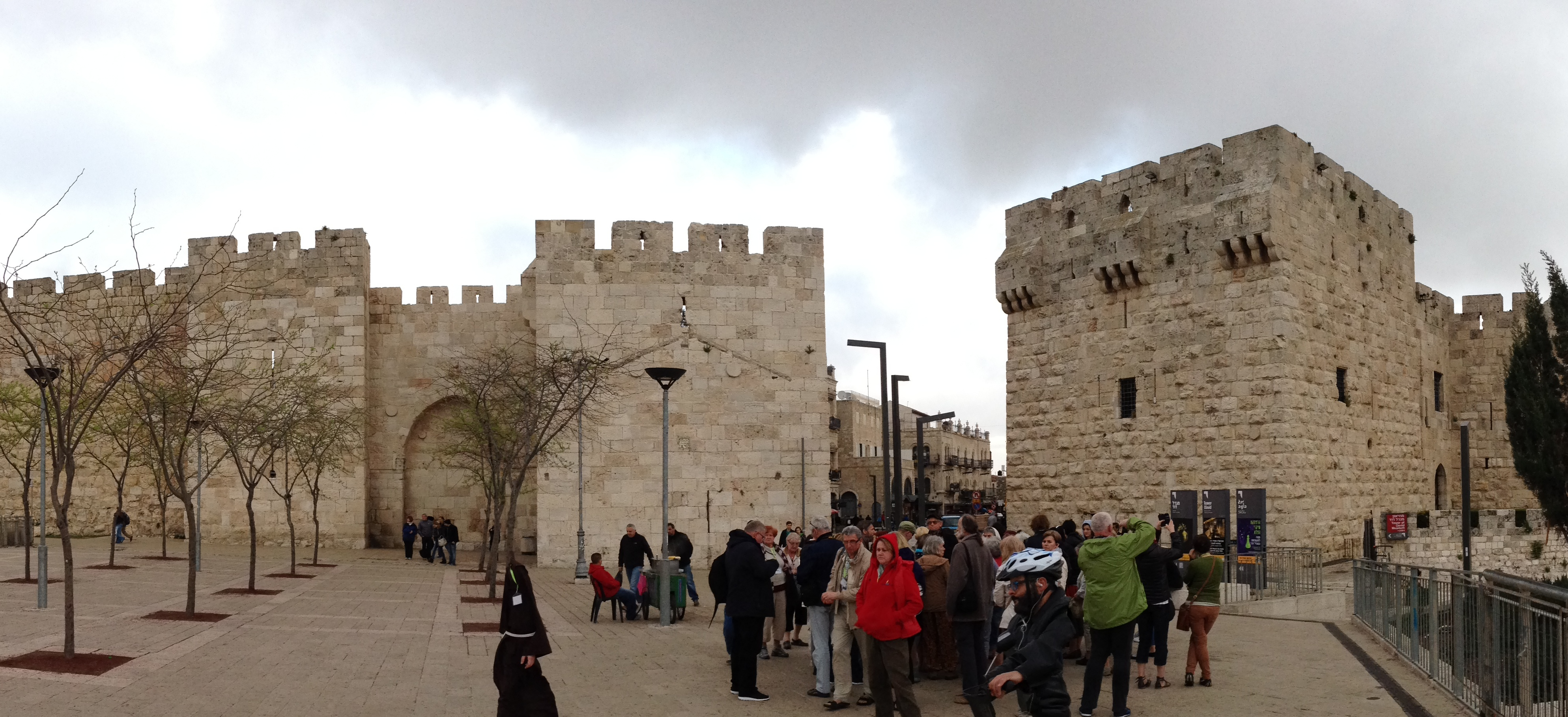
Breach in the wall of Jerusalem made at the Jaffa Gate filled in to accommodate the Kaiser's triumphal entry

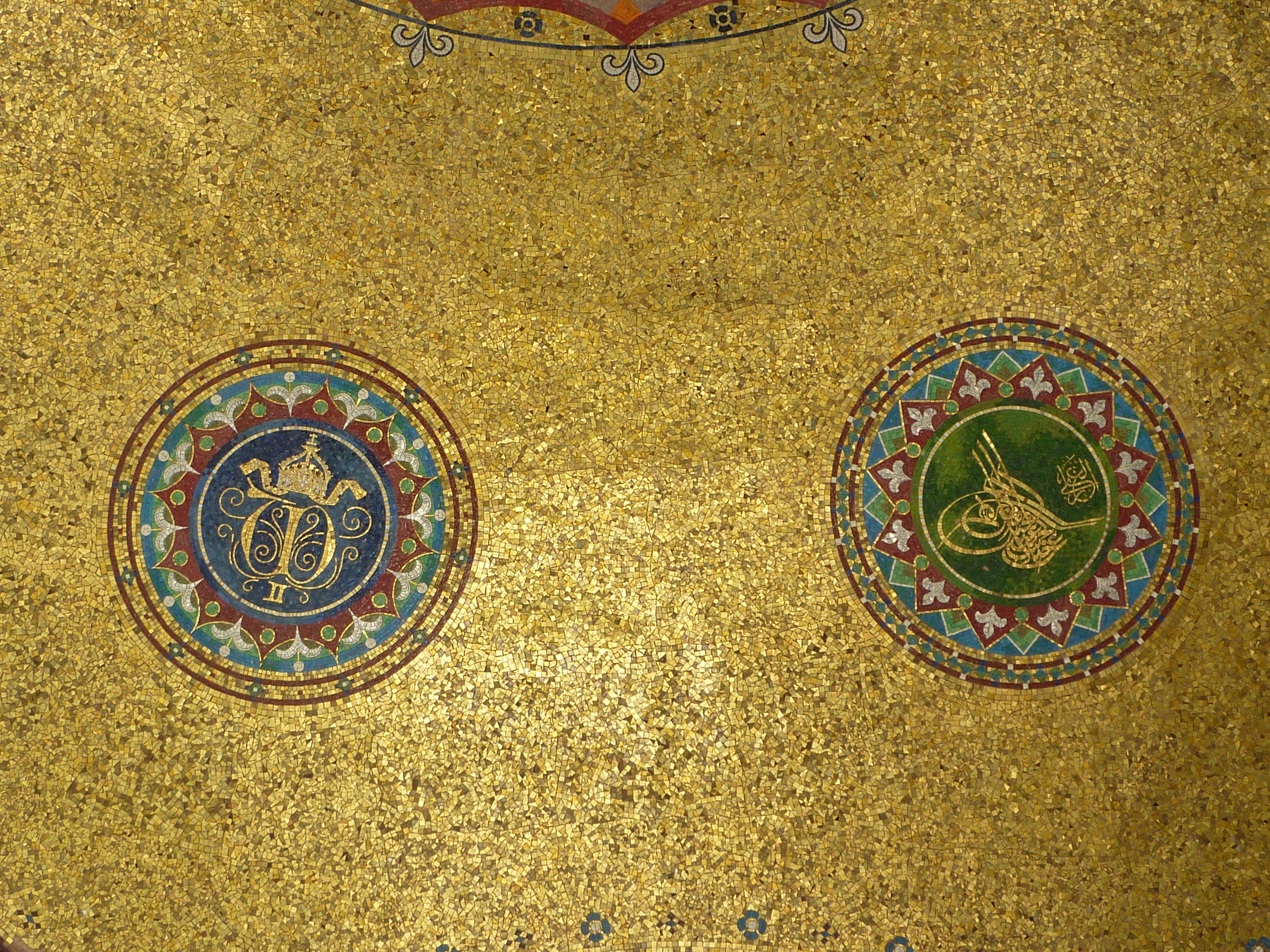
The monogram of Wilhelm II and the tughra of Abdul Hamid II on the dome of the German Fountain in Istanbul, commemorating the Kaiser's visit to the Ottoman Empire in 1898.

- In Damascus, scholars accompanying the Kaiser were allowed to examine the manuscripts in the Qubbat al-Khazna
- In Jerusalem, the Kaiser dedicated the Lutheran Church of the Redeemer, Jerusalem, donating graciously for the ongoing construction (1897-1902) of the Shaare Zedek Medical Center, initiated by Jewish Germans, gave a grant to buy the plot for the new building of the Biqqur Cholim Hospital, and acquired land to build the Abbey of the Dormition and the Paulus-Haus for The German Association of the Holy Land
- The Ottoman government planned a large opening (a "breach") in Jerusalem's city wall next to the now pedestrian Jaffa Gate to allow the Kaiser to enter triumphally. When prior to his voyage the German consulate in Jerusalem reported to William II about that Ottoman plan, to open a breach in Jerusalem's walls he noted: “This should be inhibited, I do not hope that such barbarism will really happen.” The opening which the Kaiser considered a barbarian act to the city's historic heritage, remains today
- The Jerusalem Cross (Prussia) was awarded to those who traveled on the visit to Palestine and attended the inauguration of the Lutheran Church of the Redeemer

== Bibliography ==
- Jan Stefan Richter (1997). Die Orientreise Kaiser Wilhelms II. 1898: eine Studie zur deutschen Aussenpolitik an der Wende zum 20. Jahrhundert. Kovač. ISBN 978-3-86064-621-2.
- Klaus Jaschinski (2002). Des Kaisers Reise in den Orient 1898. Trafo. ISBN 978-3-89626-257-8.
- Thomas Hartmut Benner (2001). Die Strahlen der Krone: die religiöse Dimension des Kaisertums unter Wilhelm II. vor dem Hintergrund der Orientreise 1898. Tectum Verlag DE. ISBN 978-3-8288-8227-0.
- Conrad Schick, 1898, Preparations made by the Turkish Authorities for the Visit of the German Emperor and Empress to the Holy Land in the Autumn of 1898

== See also ==
- Ali Sami Bey
