= Illés Relief =

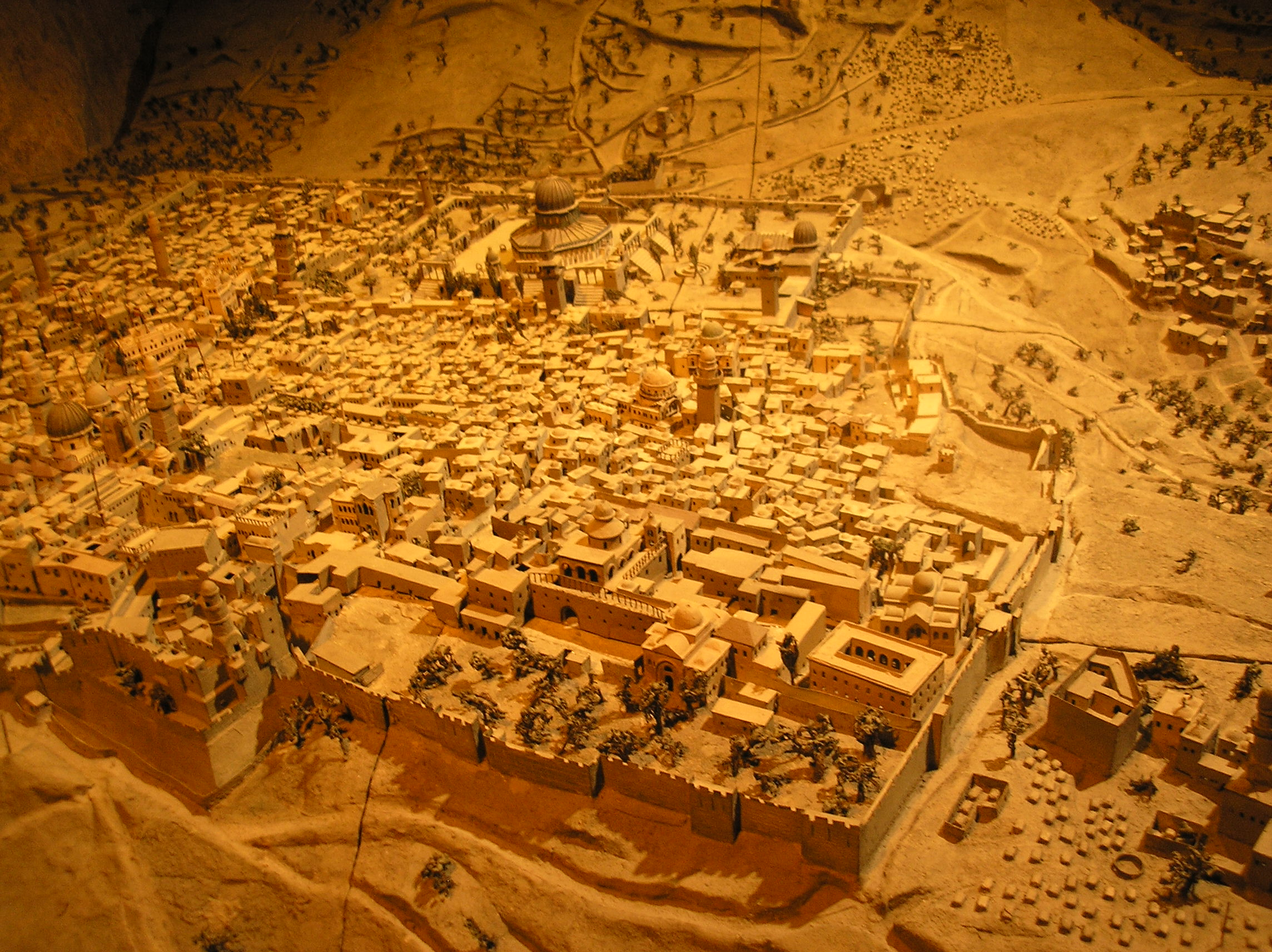
The Illés Relief

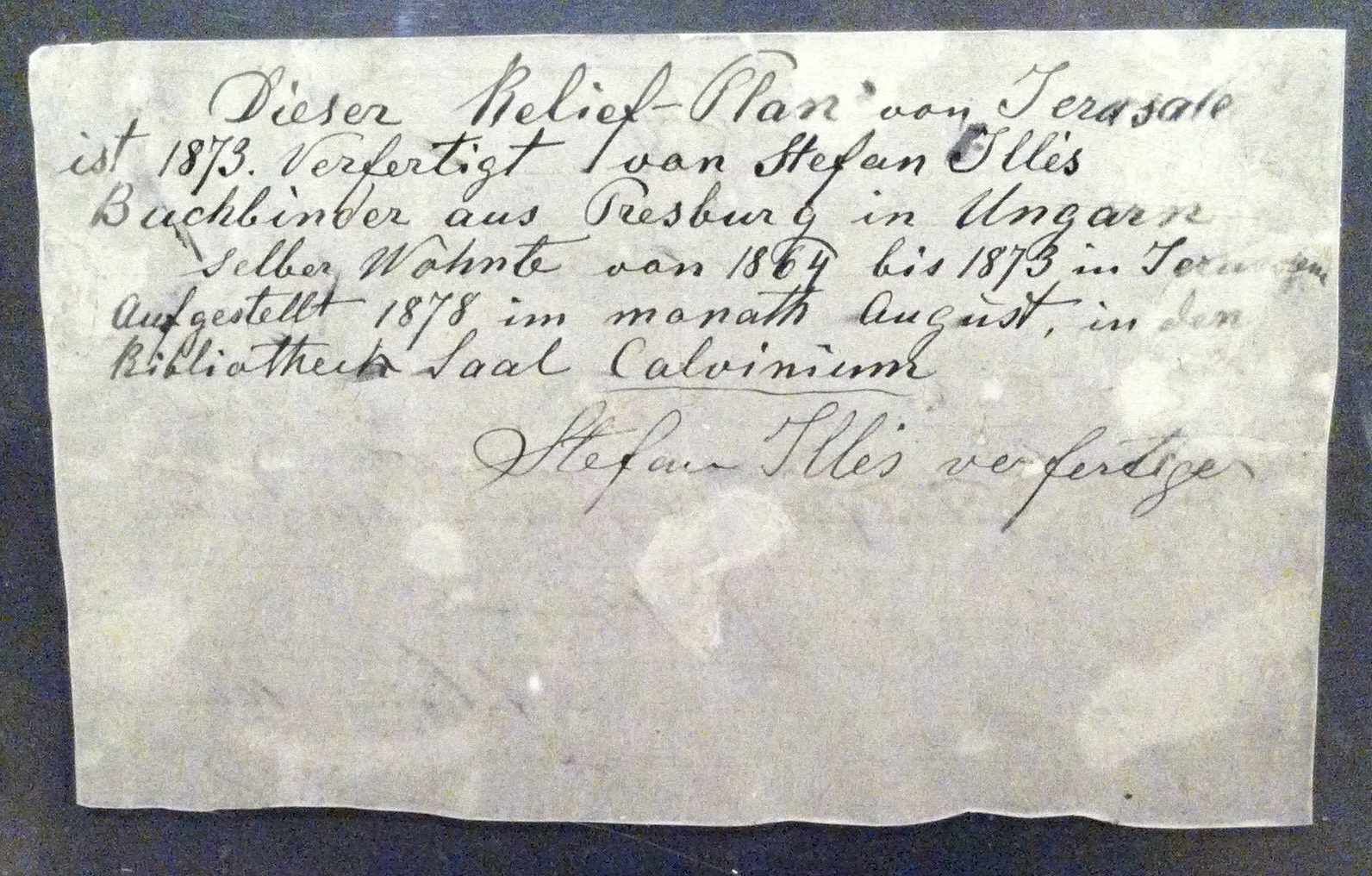
Description label on the relief

Illés Relief is a 1:500 scale model of the city of Jerusalem, built for the Ottoman Pavilion at the 1873 Vienna World's Fair.

It was based on the Ordnance Survey of Jerusalem and research by Conrad Schick. Schick also produced the Schick models of Jerusalem for the fair.

== History ==
The model is made from molten and beaten zinc and is hand-painted. It was hand-crafted between 1864 and 1873 by Stefan Illés (Hungarian: [ˈilleːʃ], Illés István), a Hungarian Catholic who lived in the city making a living from book binding. The scale model reflects the city under the later stages of Ottoman rule. The model is considered the first scientific relief model of the city.

After being displayed in the Ottoman Pavilion at the 1873 Vienna World's Fair, the model was displayed around Europe and was purchased in 1878 by community leaders in Geneva, where it was displayed in the Calvinium (the Salle de la Réformation) for 40 years. In 1920 the building in which the model was housed was leased by the League of Nations. The model was moved and soon forgotten. In 1985, then graduate student Moti Yair of the Hebrew University came across a reference to it and tried to track down its location. With the help of some friends and a librarian from the Library of Geneva, the model was found in the library's attic. Shortly afterwards the model was offered to Jerusalem on permanent loan, and it is on exhibition at the Tower of David Museum in Jerusalem.

== See also ==
- Holyland Model of Jerusalem
