= Sa'ad and Sa'eed Mosque =

Mosque in Jerusalem

- مسجد سعد و سعيد
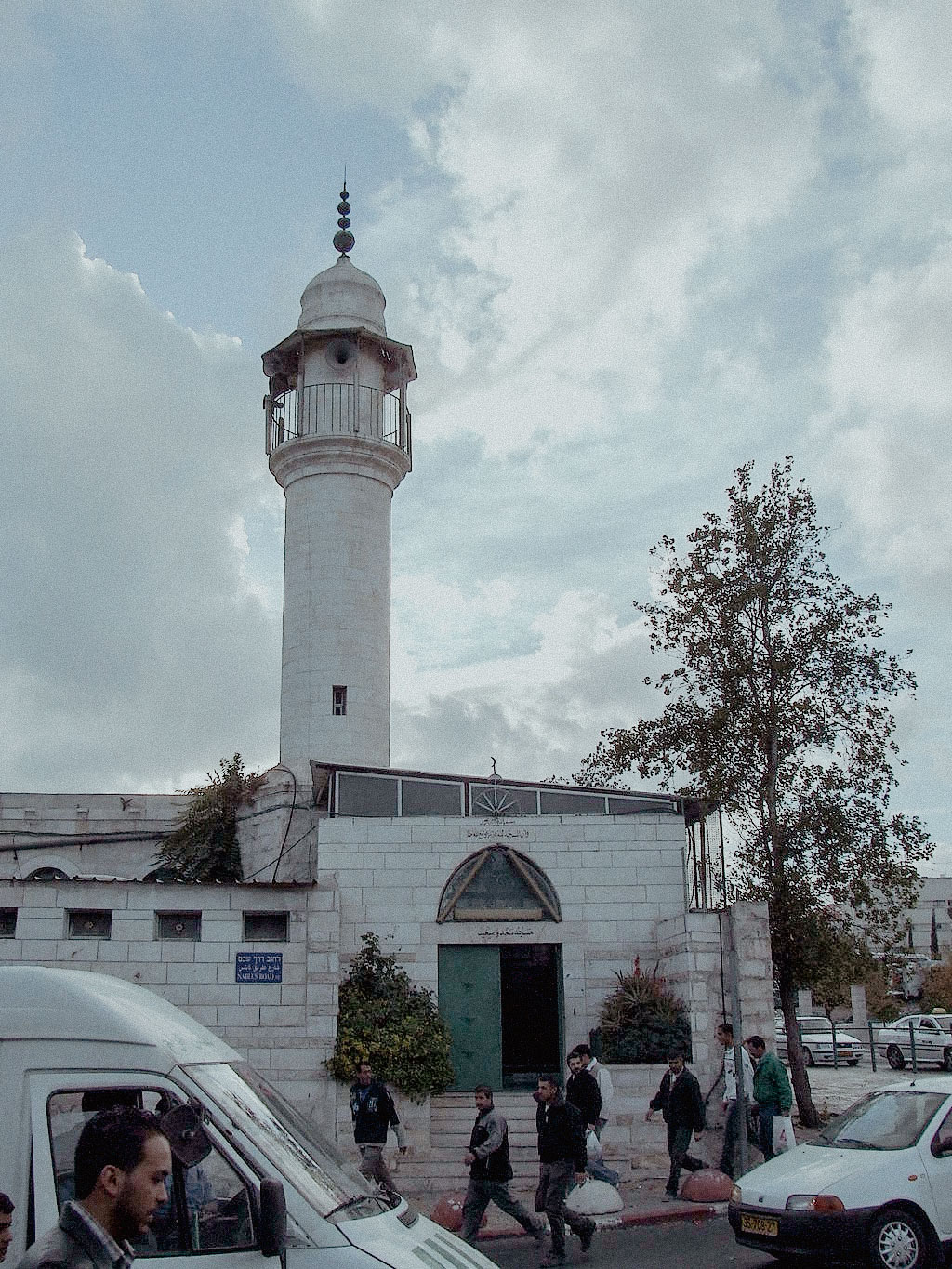

- Location of the mosque in Jerusalem

Religion
- Affiliation: Islam
- Ecclesiastical or organizational status: Mosque
- Status: Active

Location
- Location: Nablus Road, Jerusalem
- Interactive map of Sa'ad and Sa'eed Mosque
- Coordinates: 31°47′07″N 35°13′43″E

Architecture
- Completed: 1905 CE

Specifications
- Minaret: One
- Site area: 117 m^{2} (1,260 sq ft)

The Sa'ad and Sa'eed Mosque (Arabic: مسجد سعد و سعيد) is located on Nablus Road in Jerusalem, 400 metres (1,300 ft) from the Damascus Gate. It is built on a Waqf (religious endowment) property with an area of 117 square metres (1,260 sq ft).

== Historical Information ==
The Sa'ad and Sa'eed Mosque derives its name from two local merchants renowned for their dedication to preserving the Waqf in the city. It was constructed in its current state in 1905 on the Waqf property of Shams al-Din al-Bulqini.

The mosque was demolished in 1956 by the Israeli armed forces, and since 2011, there have been Israeli attempts to occupy the territory. The custodian of the endowment appeared before the court and presented a legal argument to prove that the Waqf had a history of 400 years and was duly registered in the Ottoman land registry.

On July 19, 2022, an unauthorized individual forcibly entered the mosque. Palestinians claimed the man to be an Israeli settler.

Muslims come to pray at the mosque every day, except during the Friday prayer.

== See also ==
- List of mosques in Jerusalem
- Islam in Israel
- Islam in Palestine
