= Moscheen und Madrasabauten in Iran 1785–1848 =

2005 book by Markus Ritter

Moscheen und Madrasabauten in Iran 1785–1848: Architektur zwischen Rückgriff und Neuerung
- Author: Markus Ritter
- Language: German
- Subject: Iranian architecture
- Publisher: Brill
- Publication date: 2005
- ISBN: 978-90-04-14481-1

Moscheen und Madrasabauten in Iran 1785–1848: Architektur zwischen Rückgriff und Neuerung is a 2005 book by Markus Ritter in which the author examines the late 18th- to mid-19th-century architecture of Iran in mosques and madrasas. The book won the Farabi International Award.

== Reception ==
The book has been reviewed in the Abstracta Iranica and Iranian Studies.

== See also ==
- Qajar art
