= Markus Ritter (art historian) =

German art historian

Markus Ritter (born 1967 in Brunswick and grown up in Wuppertal) is a German art historian and scholar in Oriental Studies specializing on History of Islamic Art. Since 2012 he works as a tenured professor at the Department of Art History of the University of Vienna in Austria.

Ritter studied at the University of Bamberg, the American University in Cairo, and the University of Teheran the disciplines and fields Islamic Art History and Archaeology, Turkology, Iranian Studies, Islamic and Arabic Studies, and Building Archaeology (MA 1994, Dr. phil. 2003). Subsequently, Ritter worked as a postdoc researcher at the Institute of Iranian Studies of the Austrian Academy of Sciences in Vienna. In 2010, following teaching assignments at the University of Bamberg and the Goethe University Frankfurt, he was appointed to the newly founded Assistant Professorship for History of Islamic Art at the Fine Arts Department of the University of Zurich. In 2012 he moved as founding professor to the new chair of Islamic Art History at the Department of Art History of the University of Vienna.

== Books ==
- Moscheen und Madrasabauten in Iran 1785–1848: Architektur zwischen Rückgriff und Neuerung, Brill: Leiden & Boston 2006 (Islamic History and Civilization: Studies and Texts; 62) ISBN 90-04-14481-1
- Der Goldkoran aus der Zeit der Seldschuken und Atabegs: Kommentar | The Golden Qur ’an from the Age of the Seljuks and Atabegs: Commentary, Graz: Akademische Druck- und Verlagsanstalt 2015 (with Nourane Ben Azzouna) ISBN 978-3-201-01999-6
- Der umayyadische Palast des 8. Jahrhunderts in Ḫirbat al-Minya am See von Tiberias: Bau und Baudekor, Wiesbaden 2017 (Studien zur islamischen Kunst und Archäologie | Studies in Islamic Art and Archaeology; 1) ISBN 978-3-89500-679-1

== Edited books ==
- Iran and iranisch geprägte Kulturen, Wiesbaden 2008 (Beiträge zur Iranistik; 27) (with Ralph Kauz and Birgitt Hoffmann) ISBN 978-3-89500-607-4
- Beiträge zur Islamischen Kunst und Archäologie, vol. 2, Wiesbaden 2010 (with Lorenz Korn) ISBN 978-3-89500-766-8
- Beiträge zur Islamischen Kunst und Archäologie, vol. 5, Wiesbaden 2017 (with Ilse Sturkeboom and Fernando Valdéz Fernández) ISBN 978-3-95490-238-5
