= Nablus Road =

Road in Jerusalem

Coordinates: 31°47′13.69″N 35°13′49.14″E

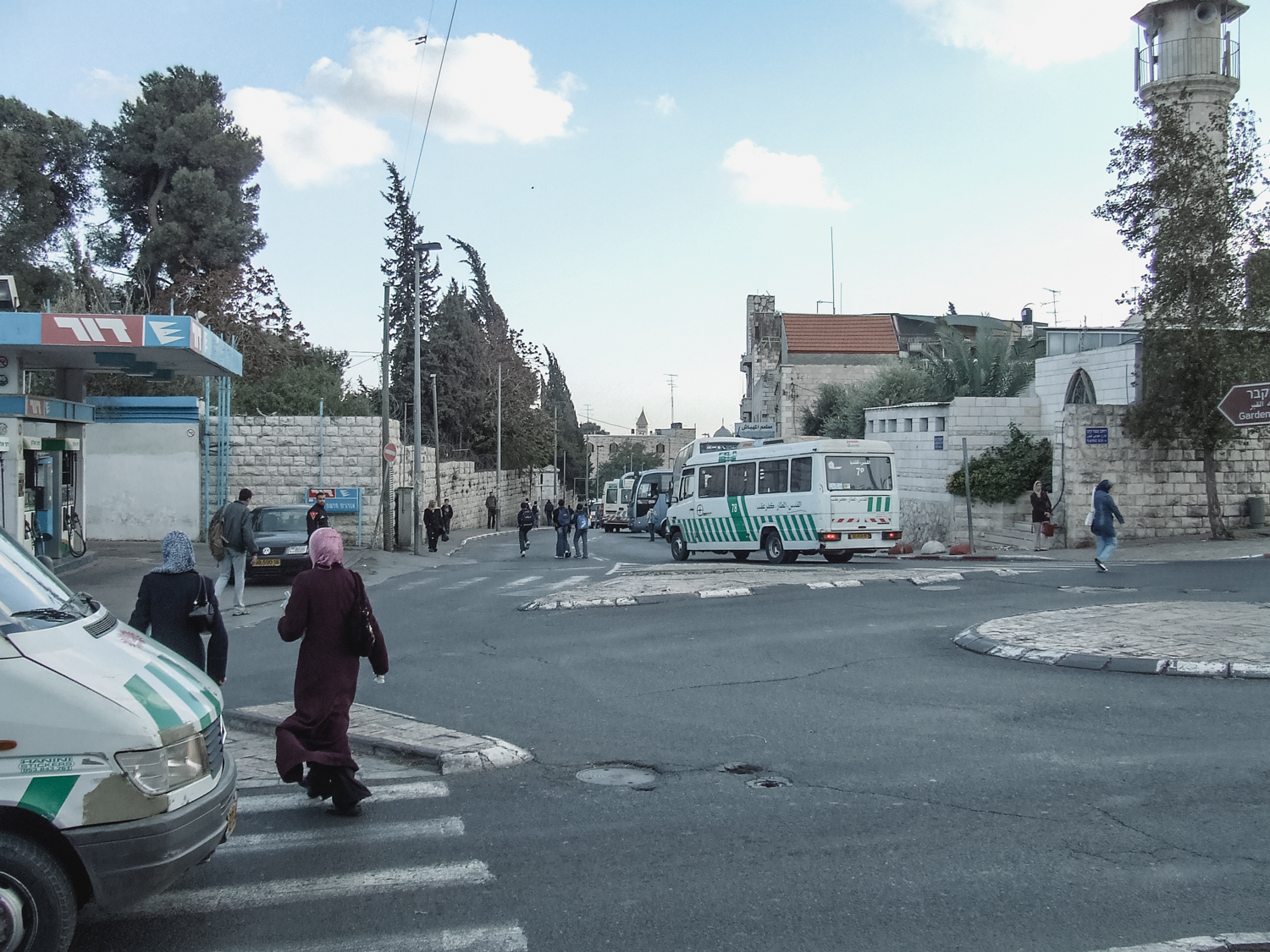
Nablus Road in 2007

Nablus Road (Arabic: شارع نابلس, romanized: Shari' Nablus, Hebrew: דרך שכם, Derekh Shekhem, "Shechem Road") is one of the oldest roads in Jerusalem. Originating at the Damascus Gate of the Old City, the road extends through several northern neighborhoods of East Jerusalem and passes notable landmarks.

== Places of interest ==
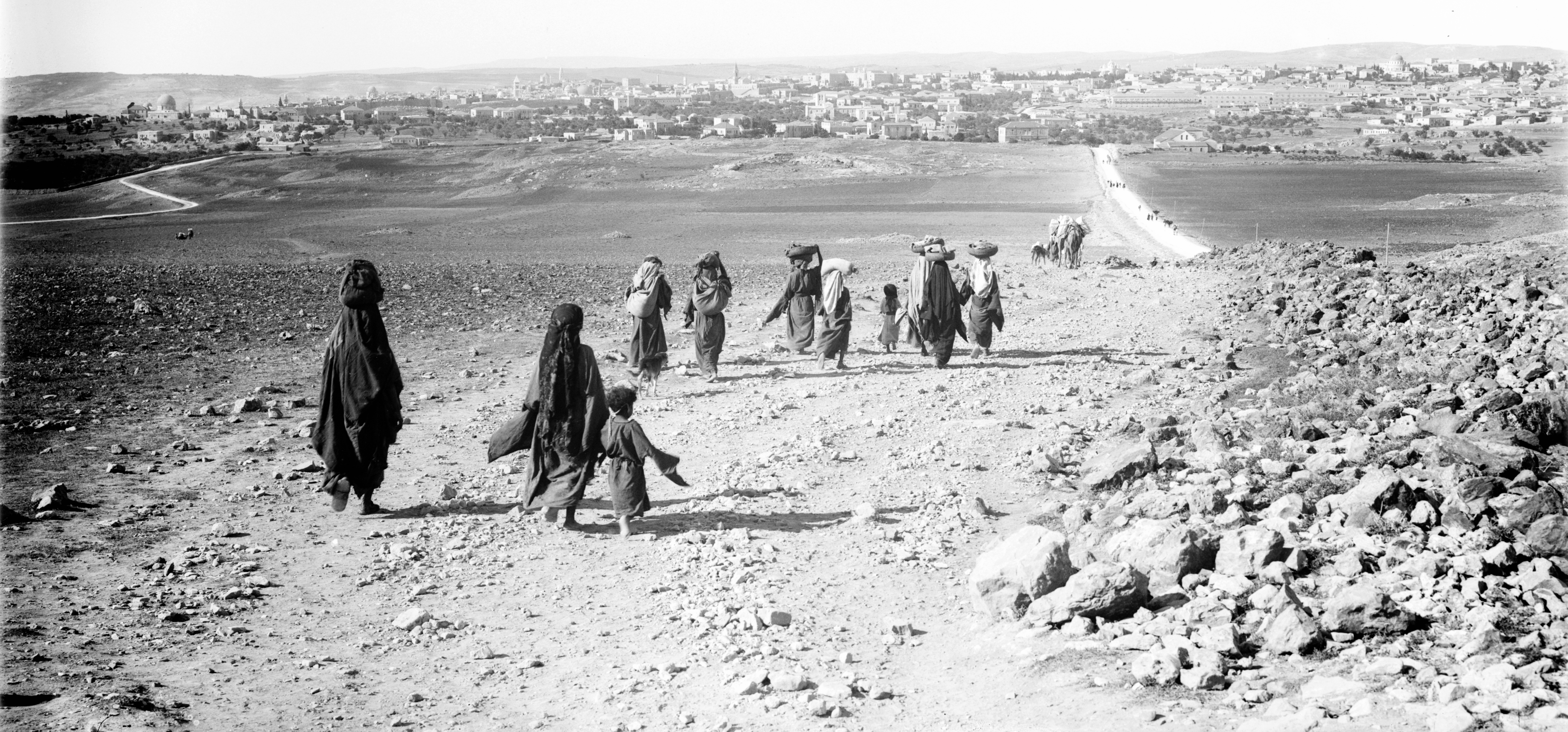
Nablus Street at the end of the Ottoman era.

- American Colony Hotel
- British Council – Jerusalem office
- Garden Tomb - Christian Protestant site
- National Headquarters of the Israel Police, police station
- Quartet on the Middle East, Office of the Quartet Representative, 54 Nablus Road
- Sa'ad and Sa'eed Mosque, mosque
- Sheikh Jarrah, neighbourhood
- Shimon HaTzadik, neighbourhood
- St. John's Eye Hospital, hospital
- St. George's Cathedral, seat of the Anglican (Episcopal) Bishop of Jerusalem
  - St. George's College, Anglican education centre
  - St. George's School, British Anglican boys' school in East Jerusalem
- St. Stephen's Basilica (Saint-Étienne) at the Dominican St. Stephen's Priory
  - École Biblique, French biblical and archaeological research centre at St. Stephen's Priory
- Tombs of the Kings, archaeological site

== See also ==
- Highway 60 (Israel–Palestine), modern Israeli intercity road connecting, among other places, Jerusalem to Nablus
- Way of the Patriarchs, the main historical north–south route in the area
