= Schmidt's Girls College =

Coordinates: 31.7827°N 35.2304°E

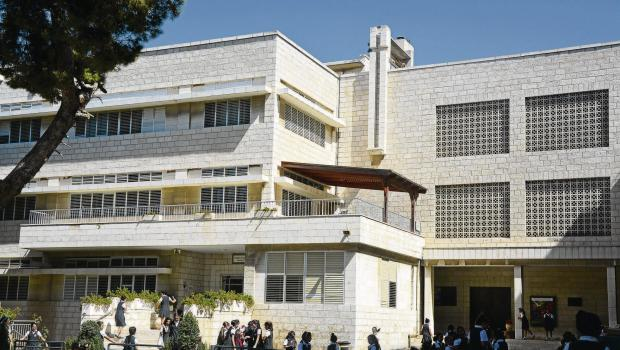
- East Jerusalem

Information
- Established: 1886
- Closed: 1914–1915, 1918–1921, 1948–1950, 1967 (several months)
- Grades: Kindergarten - High school
- Age range: 5–17
- Enrollment: approx. 500
- Website: schmidtschule.schule/index.php/en

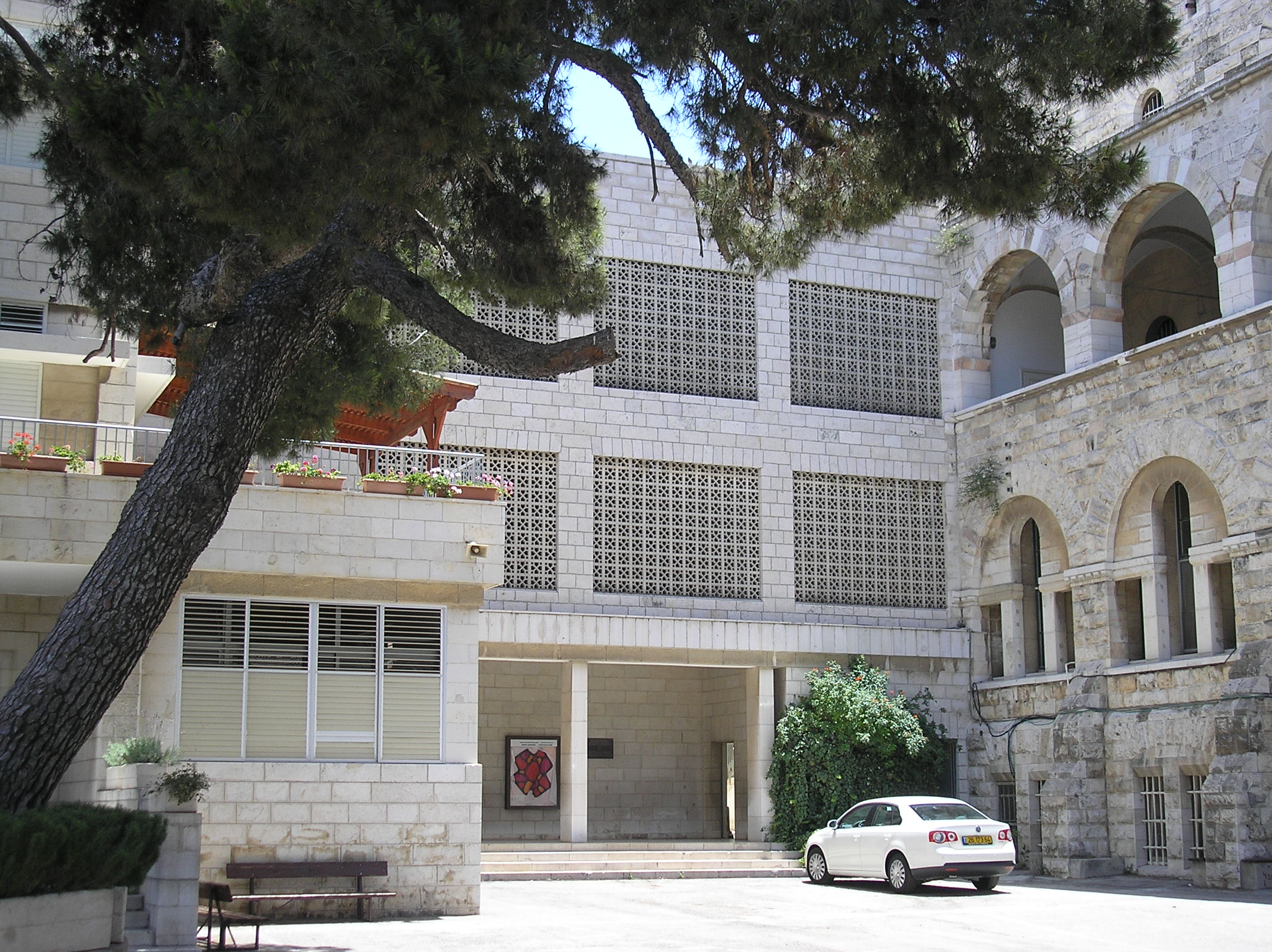
The new building is the Schmidt's Girls College

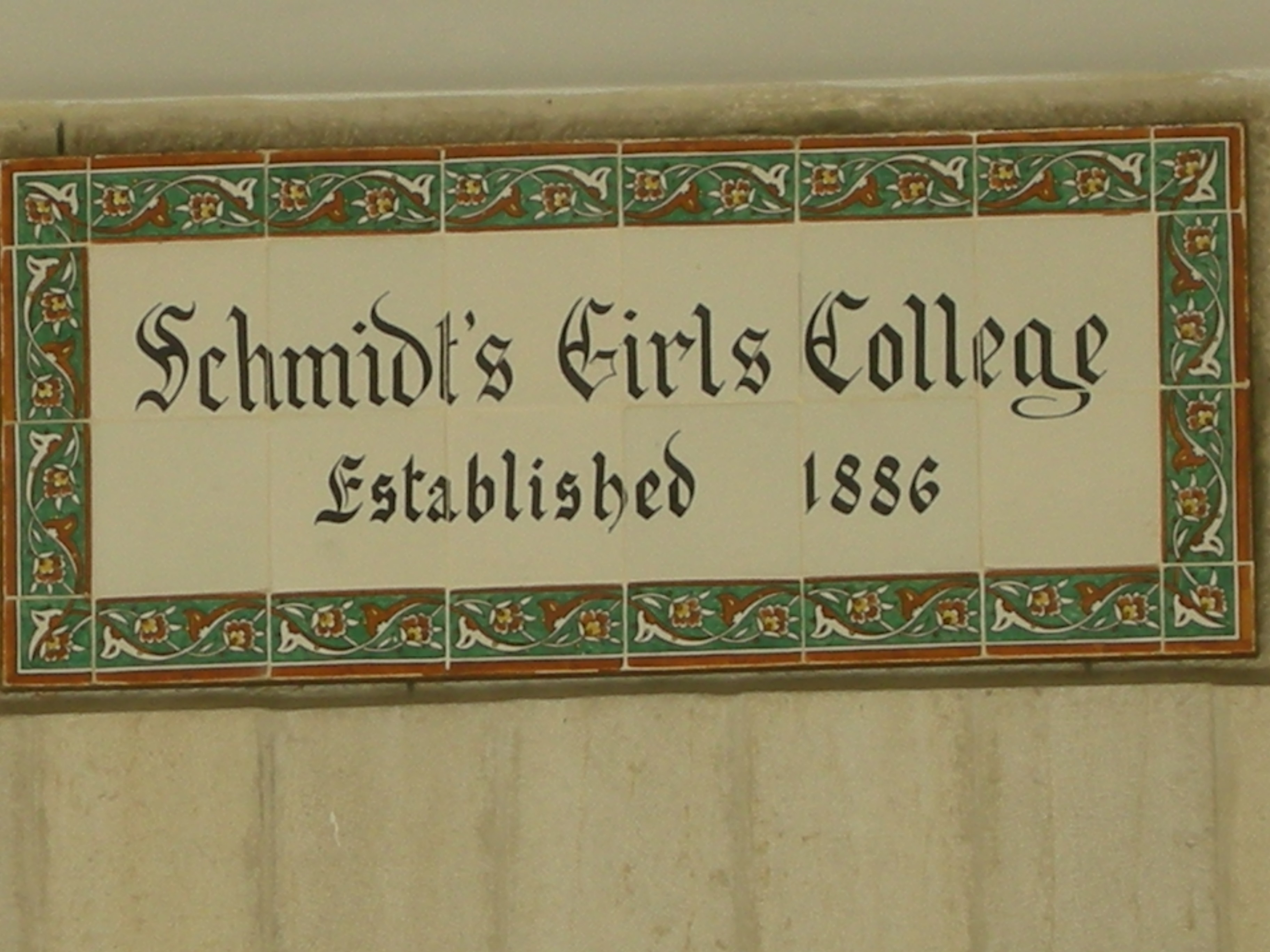
Plaque commemorating opening of the College

Schmidt's Girls College (SGC; German: Schmidt-Schule Ost-Jerusalem; Arabic: كلية شميدت) is an international German school for Christian and Muslim girls, located in East Jerusalem. It was founded in 1886 and approximately 500 pupils attend the school today. It includes a grundschule (primary school) program, as well as the Deutsche Internationale Abiturprüfung (DIAP, German International Abitur) program. It also offers a Tawjihi program. Although it is owned and supported by the German Association of the Holy Land, it is currently in the care of the international convent of the Sisters of the Congregation of Jesus. Lessons are taught in German and the spoken language outside of class is English. The teaching staff is composed of both Arab and German teachers.

== History ==
=== Ottoman period: "Old Hospice" building ===
In 1886 a school for Arab girls was established in the Mutasarrifate of Jerusalem, then part of the Ottoman Empire, in the newly built "Old Hospice", which it shared with a pilgrims hospice and a medical station, at what is today number 25 on Hillel Street, a street leading east towards the Jaffa Gate. The school and the medical station were under the care of a convent of the Catholic Sisters of Mercy of St. Borromeo. In 1890, the German Lazarist, Father Friedrich Wilhelm Schmidt (1833-1907) took on the administrative role for the school, developing it until his fatal accident. The school takes its name from him. The pupils' numbers grew from 36 in 1890 to approximately 120 in 1914, and to 138 in 1915. The syllabus followed the learning plans of German state schools.

During Kaiser Wilhelm II's journey through Palestine, he also paid a visit to the Schmidt's Girls College. At a meeting with him, Wilhelm Schmidt suggested building a new bigger and more suitable accommodation for pilgrims. The kaiser had already supported the construction of the Lutheran Church of the Redeemer in the Old City and the establishment of the Abbey of the Dormition on Mount Zion. With his support, the German Association of the Holy Land acquired two parcels directly opposite the Damascus Gate in Jerusalem, where they built the Paulus-Haus. After Schmidt died in 1907, the administrative role was passed on to Father Ernst Schmitz, who continued building the library and expanded the natural sciences collections. The pilgrims' hospice moved into the new building in 1908, where a teachers' seminary was also established. As a result, more teaching space became available in the old hospice.

At the start of the First World War, the school was initially closed, like all other international institutions, but it resumed activity at the start of 1915 due to the good relations between Germany and the Ottoman Empire. The only requirement was to include Turkish as a teaching language.

=== British period ===
After the capture of Jerusalem by the British forces in late 1917 the college closed down for three years. When it reopened, under the British Mandate of Palestine, English replaced German as the main teaching language. However, German was later used again. By adopting Palestinian learning plans, the pupils could receive Palestinian certificates of secondary education alongside their German ones, as well as take a teaching exam. Initially, the college taught 27 pupils split between two classes and a kindergarten group. Because of the small number of female pupils, boys were also accepted until 1930. By 1936 the student body had increased to 370.

German became an obligatory foreign language from the sixth grade onwards in the 1930s. A German division was composed of two classes of German students taught according to German syllabuses.

From 1925 on the German church and state increased its support for the college, however the college remained largely unaffected by the Nazi ideology after 1933.

At the start of the Second World War the German teachers were deported, including the head of the school, Sister Marina Kramm, who was replaced by the Arab Sister Elia Sa’ati. The German teaching staff returned in 1943 and the school remained active until the start of the Palestine War in May 1948.

=== Jordanian period: "Paulus-Haus" ===
The old hospice in Hillel Street, used as a school building, lay in the western, Israeli part of Jerusalem after the ceasefire agreement of 1949. However, the students mainly lived in East Jerusalem, then under Jordanian administration and had to cross the ceasefire line on their way to the college. As a result, the school was temporarily moved into the Paulus-Haus on 1 October 1950. The headmaster, Father Sonnen, was able to achieve the move quickly through the support of the Israeli authorities, enlisting the help over 60 vans for the transportation purposes. Three years later the school had approximately 400 students. (The Old Hospice buildings have since been housing the Jerusalem Italian Jews Association, with the Italian Synagogue and, since 1952, the Museum of Italian Jewish Art.)

The Paulus-Haus was not conceived as a boarding school and had to continue to serve as a hospice. In the 1950s several new buildings were constructed and in 1962 a new school site began to be built on land adjacent to the Paulus-Haus. Although it was completed on 14 May 1967, the Six-Day War began only a few days later, during which the new building suffered heavy external damage.

=== Israeli period: new building ===
In June 1967 Israel occupied East Jerusalem and the West Bank, where part of the students are coming from.

== Notable former pupils ==
- Karimeh Abbud (1893–1940), photographer
- Yusra Al Barbari (1923–2009), Palestinian teacher and activist
- Salma Khadra Jayyusi (1925–2023), Palestinian historian and literary scholar

== See also ==
- Education in the Ottoman Empire
  - List of schools in the Ottoman Empire
