= The German Association of the Holy Land =

- Abbreviation: DVHL
- Formation: 11 March 1855
- Type: Aid agency
- Purpose: Humanitarian aid
- Headquarters: Cologne, Germany
- Region served: The Holy Land
- Official language: German
- Secretary General: Heinz Thiel
- President: Rainer Maria Kardinal Woelki
- Affiliations: Archdiocese of Cologne
- Website: www.dvhl.de

The German Association of the Holy Land, German: Deutscher Verein vom Heiligen Lande (DVHL), is a Roman Catholic organisation, which aims to strengthen the relationship between Christians in Germany and the Holy Land. DHVL was founded in 1895 in Rhenish Prussia as a legal entity under state protection. The Association's main office is in Cologne.

== History ==
The German Association of the Holy Land was founded on 30 July 1895 at a general meeting. It was created through the merging of the Association of the Holy Sepulchre (German: Verein vom Heiligen Grabe) and the Palestine Union of the German Catholics. The former was founded in 1855 by the initiative of the then canon of the Cologne Cathedral Gottfried Strauß and the latter was established in 1885. A government decree signed on 11 March 1895 gives to the DVHL the status of a legal entity under the protection of the German state, valid to this day.

Following the First World War and after the outbreak of the Second World War, the meetings of the Association were under the forced administration of the British Armed Forces for several years.

In 1854, two Catholics from the Archdiocese of Cologne travelled through the Holy Land, where they learned about the difficult living conditions of the Catholic Christians in Palestine and the run down state of the holy sites. Upon their return, they encouraged the establishing of the Association of the Holy Grave, which aimed to support the Catholic Church and its institutions in the Holy Land.

In 1885 it established ties with the Palestine Union of the German Catholics, which aimed to "strengthen the German Catholic ways in the holy land of Palestine". In 1895 both organisations merged into the German Association of the Holy Land. By then, the target group had extended to all oppressed Christians in the Ottoman Empire under the control of Sultan Abdul Hamid II. Following the decisions reached at the Bishops’ Conference at Fulda in 1896, donations were gathered for the victims of the Hamidian massacres.

Through the nationwide interest in the Holy Land and the population's religious sense of mission, the German Association of the Holy Land attracted new members within the German Kingdom. As a result, the number of members increased to 30.000. The Association also constructed lavish buildings in Jerusalem, competing with other European nations and denominations doing the same. The impressive Abbey of the Dormition, which is owned by the Association, was built on a patch of land on Mount Zion gifted by Kaiser Wilhelm II. Afterwards, they began constructing a large hospice for the hundreds of pilgrims travelling to the Holy Land.

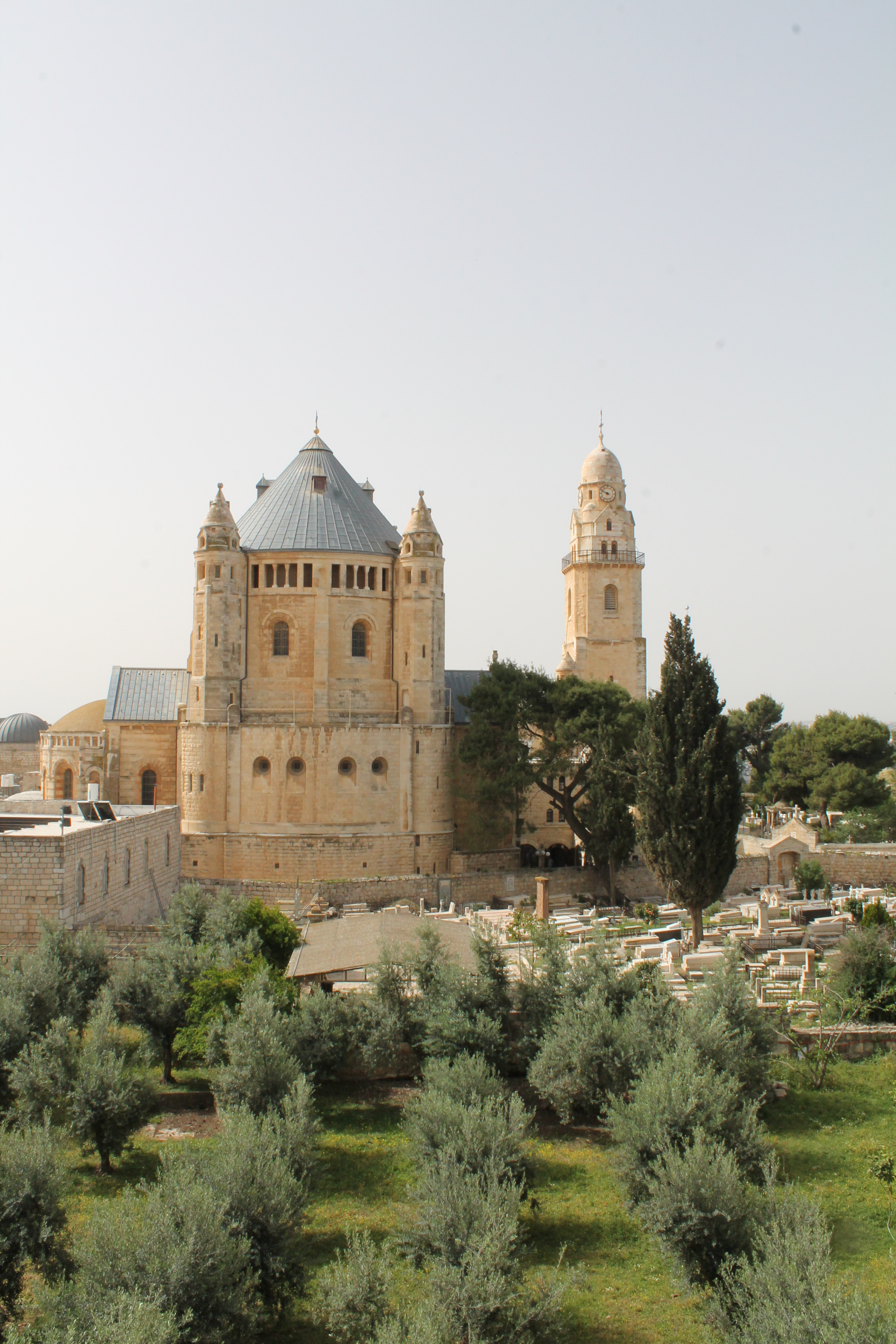
Abbey of the Dormition, Jerusalem

The Association also supported a school for young European and Arab girls. However, its original plan of establishing Catholic settlers in economic colonies in Palestine failed, as they couldn't find any volunteers. More hospices for pilgrims were raised on patches of land in Emmaus and Tabgha on the Sea of Galilee, which were cultivated with the help of local Bedouins. The work of the Association was made considerably more difficult by the two world wars and their consequences, such as the British occupation of Palestine in 1917.

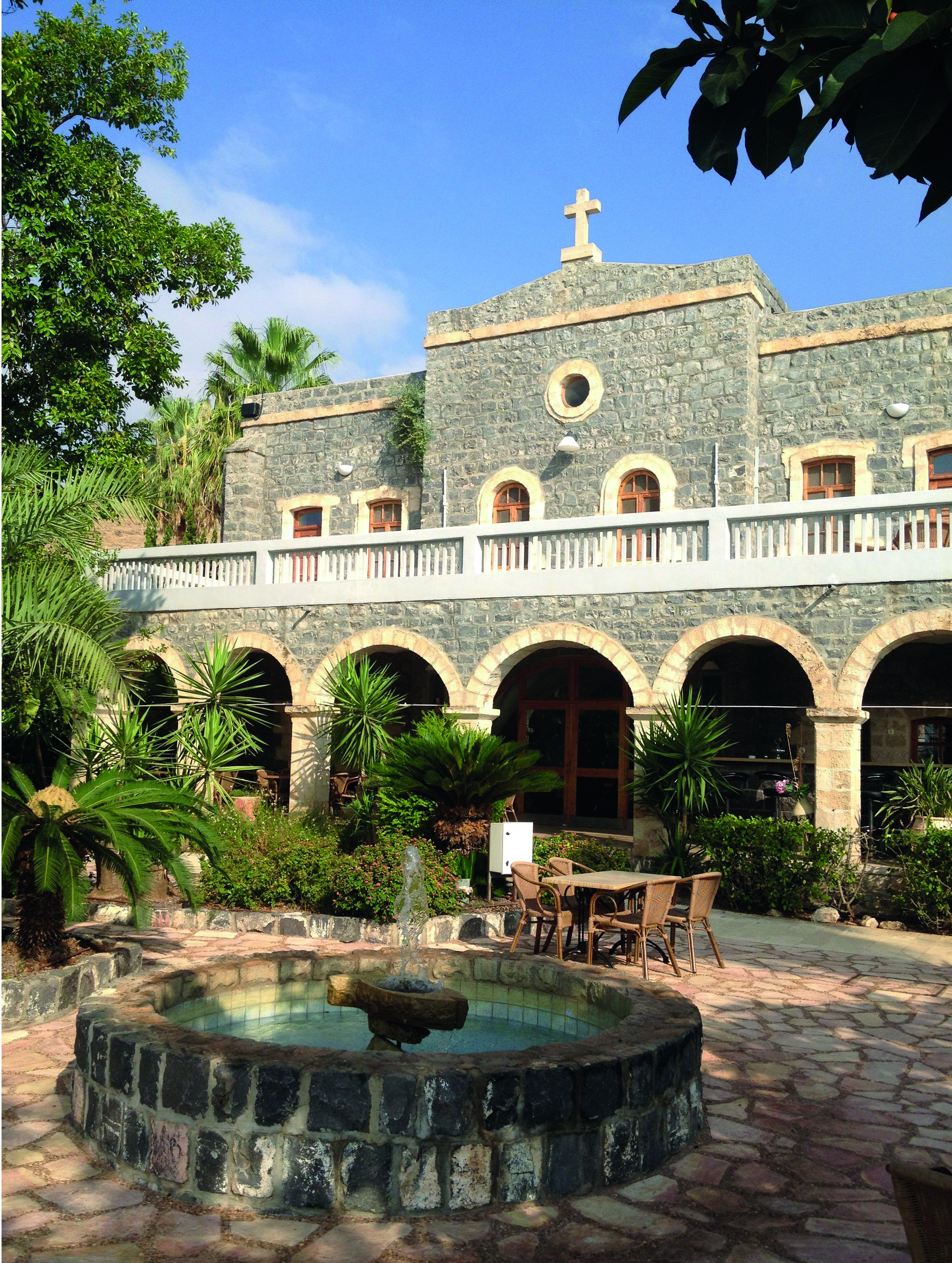
Pilgrim House Tabgha

However, the Association successfully kept and still supports its institutions, located in present-day Israel and the Palestinian areas. Today, the German Association of the Holy Land acts as a charitable organization, supporting all Christians in the Middle East. It encourages understanding and reconciliation between religions and provides help to those in need. It also fosters social and pastoral projects in its historical buildings, supporting its partnering religious orders and communities. Nowadays, with its organised pilgrimages and its member magazine in German, The Holy Land, (German, Das Heilige Land) the German Association of the Holy Land continues to be a bridge between Germany and the Holy Land, as it has been for the last 160 years.

== Mission ==
The main aims of the German Association of the Holy Land are the support of Christians in the Holy Land and assisting with pilgrimages to the Holy Land for German Christians. At the moment the Association maintains several pilgrim hospices and schools and supports these financially. Furthermore, it encourages a dialogue between the Christian and Jewish communities in the area.

The Association also provides opportunities for voluntary work in its institutions.

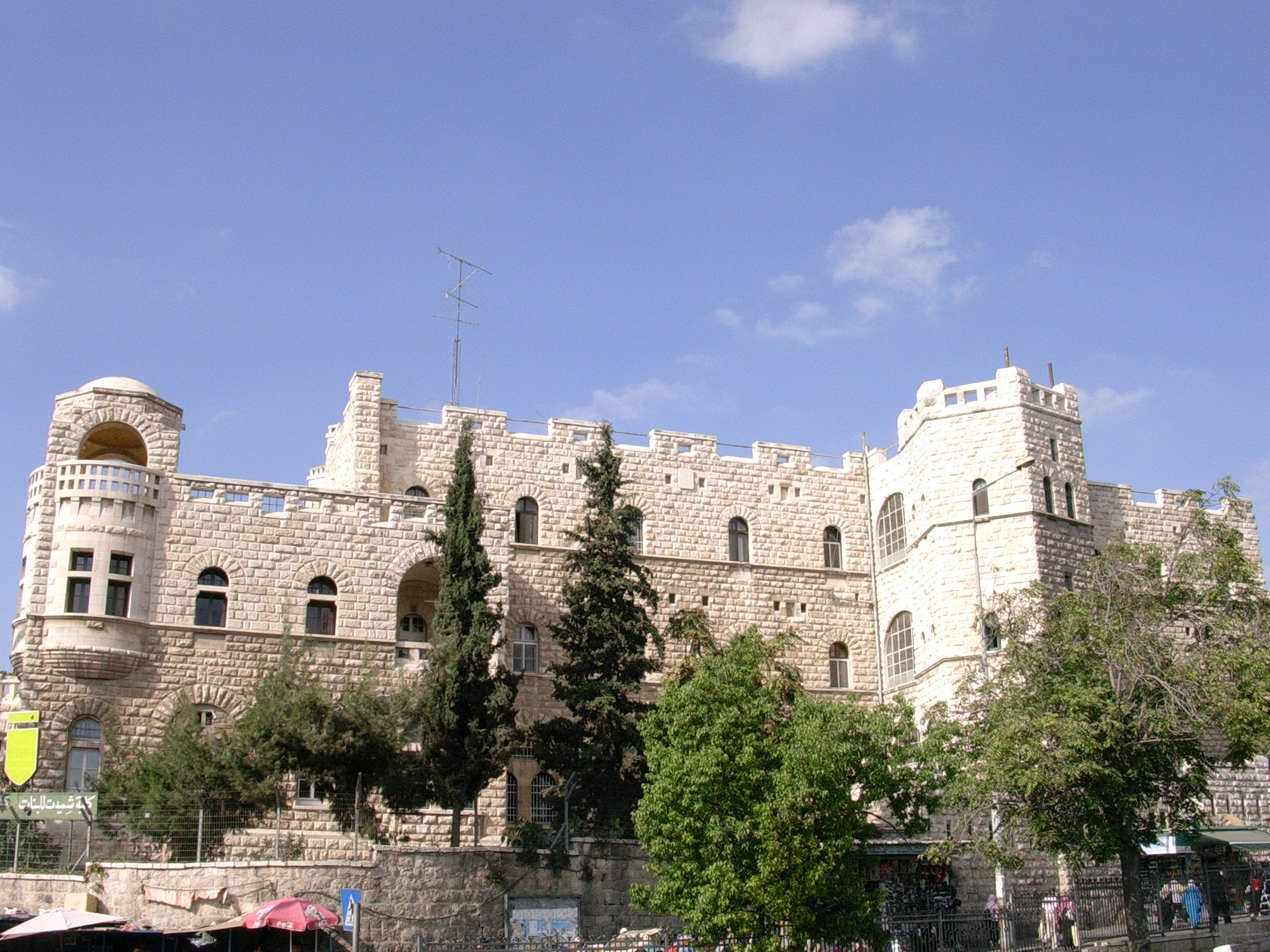
Paulus House, Jerusalem

== Administration ==
The president of the Association is the appointed Archbishop of Cologne, currently Rainer Maria Kardinal Woelki.

The board makes its business decisions by voting with the administrative council which is supported by an advisory council. The assignments in the Holy Land are coordinated by the head office in Cologne. The German Association of the Holy Land and its interests are represented by a specific presiding priest in the diocese, chosen by the respective bishop.

== General Secretaries ==
- 1908–1917 Ludwig Richen
- 1917–1922 Peter Lünskens
- 1922–1935 Josef Schröder
- 1935–1959 Gustav Meinertz
- 1969–1970 Joseph Maria Boos
- 1970–1998 Herbert Michel
- From 1998 Heinz Thiel

== Affiliated institutions ==
- Abbey of the Dormition (also Abtei Dormitio Beatae Mariae Virginis), Jerusalem. The Benedictine Abbey on the Hill of Zion is owned and maintained by the German Association of the Holy Land, but it is still in need of renovation. Adjacent to it is the Dormitio Church with its signature tower, visible through the entire Old Town of Jerusalem. The guesthouse Beit Josef is also a part of the abbey and it houses German Theology students for the academic year.
- Paulus-Haus, Jerusalem. The Paulus-Haus stands opposite the Gate of Damascus and acts as the pilgrim guest house in Jerusalem for the Association.
- Schmidt's Girls College, Jerusalem. The all-girls school founded in the latter half of the 19th century is situated near the Paulus-Haus. The well-renowned school is open to all girls regardless of their religious faith. The Association supports pupils financially.
- Beit Emmaus, El Qubeibeh, near Jerusalem. The Association maintains a nursing home and a facility for handicapped people.
- Tabgha Priory, Sea of Galilee. The German Association of the Holy Land owns and supports the famous Church of the Multiplication of the Loaves and Fish with its beautiful mosaics, as well as the Benedictine cloister at the Priory and a community center for young and handicapped people.
- Pilgrim House Tabgha, Sea of Galilee. The Association used the renovated and expanded old pilgrim hospice, which had been used between 1948 and the 1990s as the Israeli youth hospice Karei Deshe, to house its new pilgrim hospice.

== Publications ==
- Palästinahefte des Deutschens Vereins vom Heilige Lande
