= Torat Hamelekh =

Book by Yitzhak Shapira

Torat Hamelekh, or the King's Torah, is a controversial Jewish halachic (Jewish law = halakha) book by Rabbis Yitzhak Shapira and Yosef Elitzur that "discusses the circumstances in which Jews would be allowed by Jewish law to kill Gentiles (= non-Jews), based on a selective reading of Jewish texts".

The book provoked a wide public controversy. The first volume, published in 2009, mainly deals with the laws related to the killing of gentiles, in peacetime and in wartime. This part begins with the principled prohibition of killing Gentiles and continues with a discussion of situations in which it is permissible and sometimes even desirable to kill Gentiles, as a punishment for not observing the seven mitzvot of Noah's sons or in times of war. The second volume was published about six years later, at the end of 2016, and it deals with public and royal laws. This part deals with the obligation to establish a government, the individual's commitment to the government and the authority of the government to endanger the life of the individual by sending him to war.

The first volume of the book provoked a wide public controversy, with its critics claiming that it constitutes an incitement to racism and violence. In addition, an intra-rabbinic controversy arose, with his critics claiming that he is not in accordance with Orthodox law. Its writers were interrogated by the police, but were not prosecuted for it. However, the High Court severely criticized its authors and stated that "it is difficult to doubt the racist approach of the authors".

== Content ==
=== Part I: "Between Israel and the Nations" ===
The volume begins with an endorsement from Rabbi Yitzchak Ginsburgh of Chabad, on whose ideas, the authors say, the book is based. It has six chapters:

Chapter 1 – The Prohibition of Killing a Gentile: In this chapter, it is argued that the source of the prohibition of killing a gentile from the Torah is not in the commandment "Thou shalt not murder", which deals only with the murder of a Jew, but in the commandment "Whoever sheds a man's blood, his blood shall be shed", which was said after the flood, and is one of the seven commandments of the sons of Noah. The words of Rambam are cited, who writes that a Gentile who practices idolatry must not be killed, but he also must not be saved in the event that he is lost (for example, drowning in a river). The authors conclude from his words that any Gentile who is not a resident and is not at war with Israel is included in this definition.

Chapter 2 – Killing a gentile who violates the seven commandments of the sons of Noah: In this chapter, the authors discuss the conditions under which it is permissible to kill a gentile who violates one of the seven commandments of the sons of Noah, the penalty for which is death. It is stated in the chapter that "when we approach a gentile who violates seven mitzvot and kill him out of concern for the fulfillment of the seven mitzvot, there is no prohibition in the matter", however the killing is only permitted following a ruling. They present different opinions without a decision, but write that for all opinions one should not kill a gentile when the act is "corruption", such as when the gentile repents or when there is a revised legal system that is responsible for punishing him.

Chapter 3 – Sacrifice for murder among Noah's sons: In this chapter the authors discuss the question of whether it is permissible for a gentile to kill another gentile (who does not threaten to harm him) in order to save his own life. Their conclusion is that in some cases this is generally permissible (for example: when a murderer holds a hostage and shoots at other people, it is permissible to shoot the murderer even though the hostage may also be hurt), and in other cases – the permission is controversial (for example: when a person is told to kill so-and-so or we will kill you – Opinions differed on whether it is permissible for a threatened person to kill in order to be saved).

Chapter 4 – The soul of a Jew versus the soul of a gentile: In this chapter, the authors claim that "in any place where the presence of a gentile endangers the lives of Israel – it is permissible to kill him (even if he is a follower of the nations of the world and he is not at all to blame for the situation created)".

Chapter 5 – Killing Gentiles in War: According to the authors of the book, in a state of war it is permissible to kill enemy fighters, those who help the fighters and even those who support and encourage them, because all of these are defined as persecutors. It is permissible, for the benefit of the fighting, to hit enemy targets even if innocent enemy civilians may be harmed, such as bombing military targets of the enemy's army, even though people live near these targets and may be harmed.

Chapter 6 – Harming the innocent: In this chapter it is argued that it is permissible for the government to force its people to go to war and risk their lives, and even to kill those who refuse to fight or those who run away from the battle. It is easy and it is permissible to kill the enemy's citizens if it is necessary for the benefit of the war. In this section, opinions are given according to which it is permissible, in times of war, to kill gentile children as well, for example when it is clear "that they will grow up to harm us".

=== Part II: "Public and Monarchy" ===
Chapter 1 – Obligation to the state: deals with four types of mutual obligation between the state and its people, who are obligated to bear the public burden and are subject to public decisions: Bnei Sheira, neighbors, the citizens of the city and the citizens of the kingdom. Chapter 2 – Appointing a king: deals with the mitzvot of appointing a king and the authority of the king to take care of himself according to the Torah, with the understanding that his good is the good of the state. The chapter includes the question of whether the appointment of the king is initially or only as a result of the people's demand and the question of whether the appointment of the king requires the participation of a prophet. Chapter 3 – Elected officials: deals with the place of the elected officials next to the king and the relationship between a coercive government and a voluntary monarchy. Chapter 4 – The legal status of the king: deals with the question of whether the law of 'Dina Damlakuta Dina' also applies to the King of Israel. Chapter 5 – The authority of the king: deals with the authority of the king to take care of the image of the kingdom and his authority to discriminate on this basis. Chapter 6 – Sons of Noah: deals with the place of Noah in the kingdom of Israel and the right of foreigners to vote in a Jewish state.

== Controversy ==
The publication of the book provoked criticism from several rabbis who believed that the book did not conform to Halacha. Among others, Rabbi Shlomo Aviner, Rabbi Zalman Nehemiah Goldberg and Rabbi Yaakov Medan opposed the book, saying "it is a challenging book written by high-level students, and precisely because of this it should be burned and even Rabbi Shapira should be disqualified from teaching Halacha in Israel". In contrast, Rabbi Eliakim Lebanon said that he himself would not have published the book "but there are such opinions in Halacha and Rabbi Shapira bases his words on them" and "if anyone thinks of prosecuting him, then first he should do it to Prof. Sternhal who actually called for the killing of settlers and not only at the theoretical level." Rabbi Yoel Katan wrote that this is "a classic halachic Torah book, which must be measured by scholarly-halachic tests... [and] that sometimes there is a difference between the principle-theoretical halacha – and the practical halacha...".

The Anti-Defamation League released a statement on the book, asking rabbis and Orthodox leaders to condemn the book as a "blueprint for killing non-Jews".

In October 2011, the rabbi of the Shomron regional division of the Iosh Division ordered copies of the book to be removed from the synagogues at the division's bases.

Professor Yishai Rosen Zvi claims that the book suffers from decontextualization and cherry-picking, in which expressions are taken that are indeed found in the sources but while distorting their original meanings to establish the conclusions of the scripture.

== Police Investigation ==
In July 2010, Rabbi Yitzhak Shapira was arrested and taken to the police for questioning on suspicion of incitement. At the same time, the police raided his Od Yosef Chai yeshiva in Yitzhar and confiscated copies of the book. Many rabbis, including those considered moderate, condemned Rabbi Shapira's arrest. The Civil Rights Association praised the police for "opening up an investigation into this serious case" but condemned the arrest.

Rabbi Yitzhak Ginzburg was summoned for questioning following his consent to the book, and arrived at the police station accompanied by dozens of his students. Later, Rabbis Dov Lior and Yaakov Yosef were also summoned for questioning, but they announced that the position of the agreeing Rabbis had already been clarified by Rabbi Ginzburg and that they had no intention of attending. In an opinion they published they wrote: "Our holy Torah does not stand up to scrutiny. The attempt to prevent the rabbis of Israel from expressing their opinion, the Torah opinion, by means of intimidation and threats – is a very serious act and it will not succeed". The chief rabbi of Israel, Rabbi Yona Metzger, also criticized the invitation of the rabbis to the investigation.

In May 2012, the State Attorney's Office announced the closure of the investigation against the authors of the book, Rabbis Yitzhak Shapira and Yosef Elitzur, and against the book's consent givers, Rabbis Dov Lior and Yitzhak Ginzburg, due to lack of evidence. In November 2013, two petitions against the closing of the cases were submitted to the High Court of Justice. The petitions were rejected in December 2015 by a majority opinion of Supreme Court President Miriam Naor and Vice President Elyakim Rubinstein, against a minority opinion by Judge Salim Joubran. Judge Rubinstein disputed the ruling. Dino criticized the book and wrote: "Eskinen in the book wears a Jewish cover and is actually anti-Jewish, because he slanders Judaism badly"... "It is difficult to doubt the racist approach of the authors".

Petah Tikva Magistrate's Court Judge, Eliana Danieli, convicted one of the authors, Yosef Elitzur, of incitement to violence for two other publications he published in May 2013 on the website "The Jewish Voice". She referred to the Supreme Court's disapproval of the book and noted that it is possible to learn from it about the ideology and intentions of Elitzur.
