= Yitzchak Ginsburgh =

Israeli rabbi and author (b. 1944)

Rabbi Yitzchak Ginsburgh יצחק גינזבורג MSc
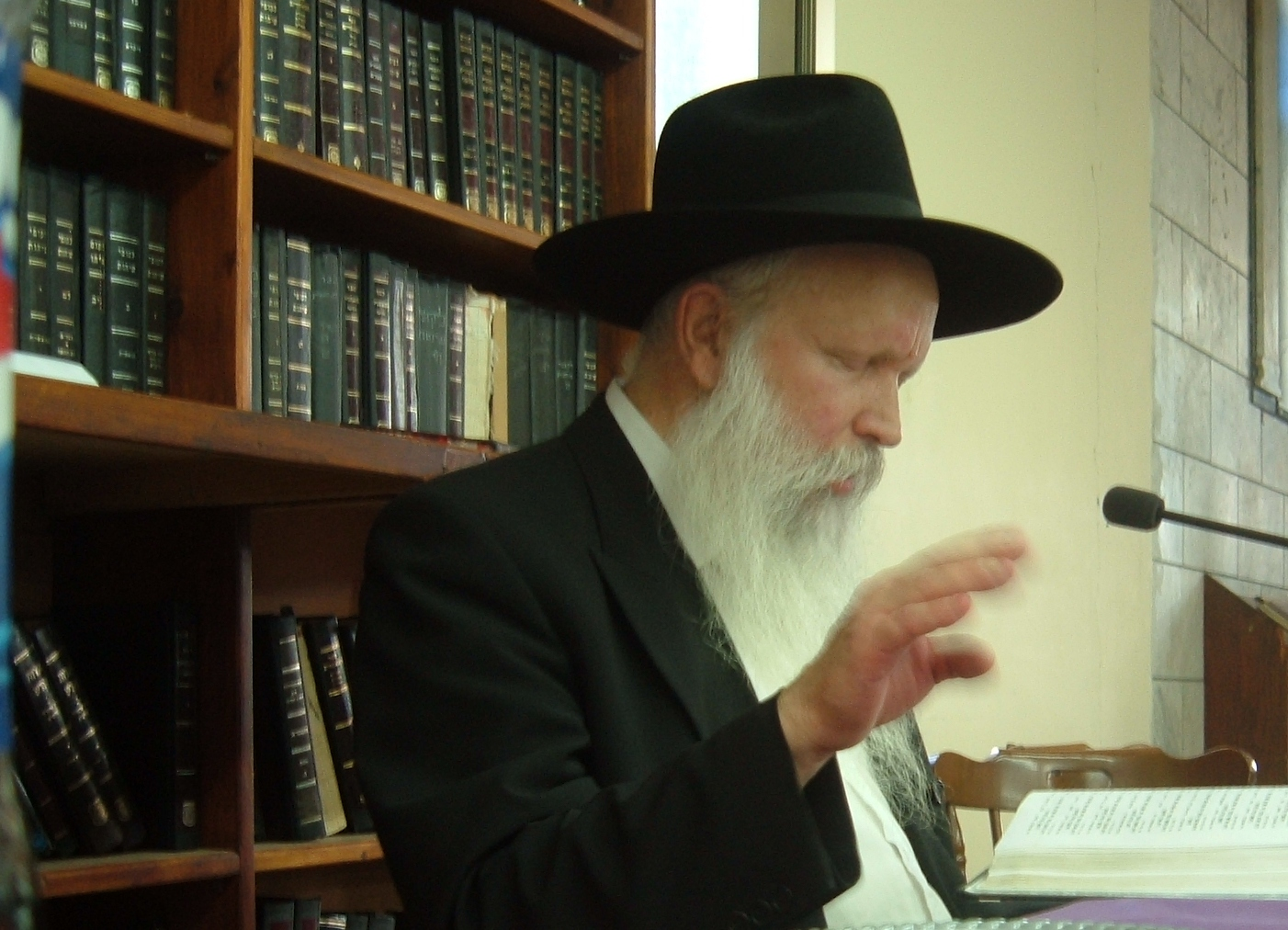

Personal life
- Born: 14 November 1944 (age 81) St. Louis, Missouri
- Spouse: Romemia nee Segal
- Parents: Shimshon Ya'akov (father); Bryna Malka (mother)

Religious life
- Religion: Judaism

Jewish leader
- Yeshiva: Tom VaDa'at (president)
- Organisation: Derech Chaim Movement (leader)
- Other: Founder of Gal Einai Institute; President of Od Yosef Chai Yeshiva, Yitzhar; Dean of Torat Hanefesh School of Jewish Psychology
- Residence: Kfar Chabad

Yitzchak Feivish Ginsburgh (Hebrew: יצחק פייוויש גינזבורג; born 14 November 1944) sometimes referred to as "the Malakh" (lit. 'the angel') is an American-born Israeli rabbi affiliated with the Chabad movement. In 1996 he was regarded as one of Chabad's leading authorities on Jewish mysticism. He is the leader of the Derech Chaim ('The Way of Life') Movement and founder of the Gal Einai Institute, which publishes his written works. His students include Charedim (ultra-Orthodoxs), religious Zionists, and Chabad Chassidim, as well as ba'alei teshuvah (penitents). He is currently the president of a number of educational institutions, including the Od Yosef Chai ('Joseph Still Lives') yeshiva in the settlement of Yitzhar in the West Bank. Ginsburgh has lectured in various countries, and throughout Israel. His teachings cover subjects including science, psychology, marital harmony and monarchy in Israel. He has published over 100 books in Hebrew and English, most of which are edited by his students.

Ginsburgh is a musician and composer. Some of his music has been performed by Israeli musicians. His students include Torah scholars, academics and musicians.

Some of his statements regarding the differences between Jews and non-Jews have aroused controversy. Ginsburgh and his students have responded to the controversy by saying that his use of concepts taken from Chassidut and Kabbalah are far removed from the language that the media has adopted.

== Biography ==
=== Early life ===
Ginsburgh was born in St. Louis, Missouri, in 1944, the only child of Shimshon Ya'akov and Bryna Malka (nee Dunie) Ginsburgh. He was considered a child prodigy in music and mathematics. Both of his grandfathers were Chabad chassidim. His parents had a great affinity to their Jewish roots and a love of the Land of Israel. His father immigrated to Israel as a young man, where he was one of the founders of the City of Ra'anana, but returned to the USA to complete his higher education. His return to Israel was delayed when the Second World War broke out and he remained in the USA, where he married Ginsburgh's mother. His father held a PhD in education and served as principal of a number of Jewish schools. The family later moved to Cleveland, Ohio, where Ginsburgh grew up until the age of 14, when his parents spent a year in Israel while his father wrote his doctorate on teaching the Hebrew language.

During their year in Israel, the young Ginsburgh studied at the Hebrew Gymnasium in Rechavia, where he learned Hebrew and began his path to Torah study by reading Ethics of the Fathers, which left a great impression upon him. Upon their return to Philadelphia, he met the Rebbe of the Nadvorna Chassidic dynasty, Rabbi Meir Isaacson, author of the Mevasser Tov responsa, and at the age of 15 became a baal teshuva. He attended the University of Chicago, majoring in mathematics and philosophy. He then completed a Masters in Mathematics at the Belfer Graduate School of Science of Yeshiva University. At the age of 20, he abandoned his doctorate studies to devote himself entirely to Torah study.

=== Israel ===
In 1965, he returned to Israel and studied at the Yeshivah of Kamenitz in Jerusalem. He spent 1966 through 1967 at the Slonim shul in Tiberias. After the Six-Day War, Ginsburgh went to Jerusalem and was one of the first to move into the old Jewish quarter. There, together with his future father-in-law, Rabbi Moshe Zvi Segal, he began renovating the ruins, sleeping at night in the Tzemach Tzedek synagogue.

In the summer of 1967, he went to the Torat Emet Chabad yeshivah in Jerusalem, where he studied the Chabad school of Chassidus in depth. That year he visited the Lubavitcher Rebbe, Rabbi Menachem Mendel Schneerson, and remained in Crown Heights, Brooklyn for several months. There, he was accepted for private audience with the Rebbe, whose guidance became his leading influence.

When he returned to Israel, he married Rabbi Segal's daughter, Romemia. They lived in Jerusalem, where Ginsburgh studied with Reb Asher Freund, helping to establish Freund's charity organization, Yad Ezrah. He also took part in founding Freund's Or Yerushalaim yeshivah in Jerusalem, where he taught Talmud, Shulchan Aruch, and Chassidut. During this period, a kernel of students developed around him.

In 1971, following an instruction from the Lubavitcher Rebbe, he moved with his wife and growing family to Kfar Chabad. In 1973, at the beginning of the Yom Kippur War, under instruction from the Lubavitcher Rebbe, Ginsburgh visited the warfront to transmit the Rebbe's blessing to officer Ariel Sharon, who later became 11th Prime Minister of Israel. The next morning, after a successful battle, Ginsburgh presented Sharon with a lulav and etrog.

Ginsburgh founded the Chabad house in the Yamit settlement in Sinai, where he lived during the last few weeks before the settlement's destruction by the Israeli government in 1982. He returned to Kfar Chabad in 1982, and was asked by Jerusalem rabbi and philanthropist Yosef Eliyahu Deutch to serve as head of the Shuva Yisra'el Yeshivah on Yo'el Street. Rabbi Ginsburgh gave frequent classes on a wide variety of subjects, from the exoteric to the esoteric parts of the Torah. Many were taped and form a large part of the 15,000 lecture archive of his classes.

Ginsburgh served as the Rosh Yeshivah of the Od Yosef Chai Yeshivah (then located at Joseph's Tomb) from 1987 until the retreat of the IDF from the Tomb in Nablus during the Al-Aqsa Intifada (2001). He also served as the head of a Kollel in the Menuchah Rachel Synagogue in Hebron and as the head of a Kollel in the ancient Shalom Al Yisrael Synagogue in Jericho. As of 2014, he served as the president of a number of educational institutes run by his students, including the Torat Chaim elementary school for boys (Jerusalem), the Ya'alat Chen elementary school for girls (Jerusalem), Ma'ale Levonah high school for girls, and the Tom Vada'at Yeshivah in Jerusalem. He is also president of the Od Yosef Chai Yeshivah since its relocation to Yitzhar. In addition, he is the dean of the Torat Hanefesh School of Chassidic Psychology, founded and run by his students.

Ginsburgh lives with his wife in Kfar Chabad. One of his sons is Rabbi Yossi Ginsburgh, the Rosh Yeshivah of Tomchei Temimim Yeshivah in Ramat Aviv.

== Teachings ==
Ginsburgh follows Chassidic practices in his teaching style and is proficient in many aspects of Chassidic literature. He bases his teachings on Kabbalah and Chassidut and presents them in practical terms, rendering the profound concepts of the original Kabbalistic texts relevant to today's world and presenting them in modern language. Although the media has dealt almost exclusively with his two booklets that address politics, the great majority of his work is of a broader and deeper scope.He has written books on Jewish law, Kabbalah, Torah and science, psychology, love, marriage and education. He has also published a book addressed to children, named Anochi Ve'Hayeladim ("Myself and the Children"). Ginsburgh specializes in analyzing modern cultural phenomena in the light of Kabbalah. These include psychology, psychoanalysis, homeopathy and economics.

He has published over 100 volumes of original work in Hebrew and more than 20 in English. Some of his books have been translated into French, Russian, Spanish and Portuguese.

Ginsburgh's teachings form a methodical ideology that covers three major areas: the individual, society and the Jewish national state. He has also developed a social and economical renewal strategy based on Torah teachings, called "The Dynamic Corporation." One of his seminars was recognized by the Israeli Ministry of Education as a supplementary teachers' training course. His books are published by the not-for-profit Gal Einai Institute, which he founded in 1991. The Hebrew name Gal Einai is taken from Psalms 119:18, meaning "Open my eyes."

He delivers classes in Israel, and has lectured in the United States and other countries including France, Canada and England.

Since December 2012, Ginsburgh has been a lead speaker at an annual gala evening commemorating the Chassidic festival 19 Kislev. The event includes performance of many of his musical compositions. In 2015, the event was held at Culture Palace in Tel Aviv, with an audience of approximately 3000 people.

Ginsburgh's style of teaching combines structured thought together with a freer, associative component that manifests in his generous use of the ancient tradition of gematria (Hebrew numerology), by which he translates between words and numbers. He also implements the use of figurate numbers in interpreting Torah verses.

=== Psychology ===
Ginsburgh's contribution to Chassidic psychotherapy has opened up new horizons in therapeutic practice, whose processes are already evident in modern clinical psychology. Ginsburgh sees awareness of the Divine as the key to successful psychological therapy. He aims to find the balance between science and the Torah, which will allow establishing psychology on the Torah together with empirical analysis of the data in order to develop working theories.

Ginsburgh's writings on psychology develop the three-stage Chassidic model of submission, separation and sweetening that originated in the study halls of the Ba'al Shem Tov and his followers. He has thus severed the chain of non-Jewish religious sources upon which all western schools of psychotherapy are founded.

=== Meditation ===
Ginsburgh does not adopt foreign meditative methods. He remains faithful to the Chabad system of meditation, which consists of Torah study, pre-prayer meditation, and meditation during prayer. His particular innovation is the connection between personal consciousness achieved through meditation, and a change in the collective consciousness.

Ginsburgh defines two types of meditation, "general meditation" (הִתְבּוֹנְנוּת כְּלָלִית) and "detailed meditation" (הִתְבּוֹנְנוּת פְּרָטִית) The purpose of general meditation, according to Ginsburgh, is to arouse one's natural love and awe of God. In order to arouse love, he recommends meditating on how God vitalizes the individual and the entire world at every single moment of time. Similarly, he recommends meditating on God's omniscience to arouse fear of God in one's heart.

According to Ginsburgh, three general meditative aids are music, movement and breathing exercises.

== Music and art ==
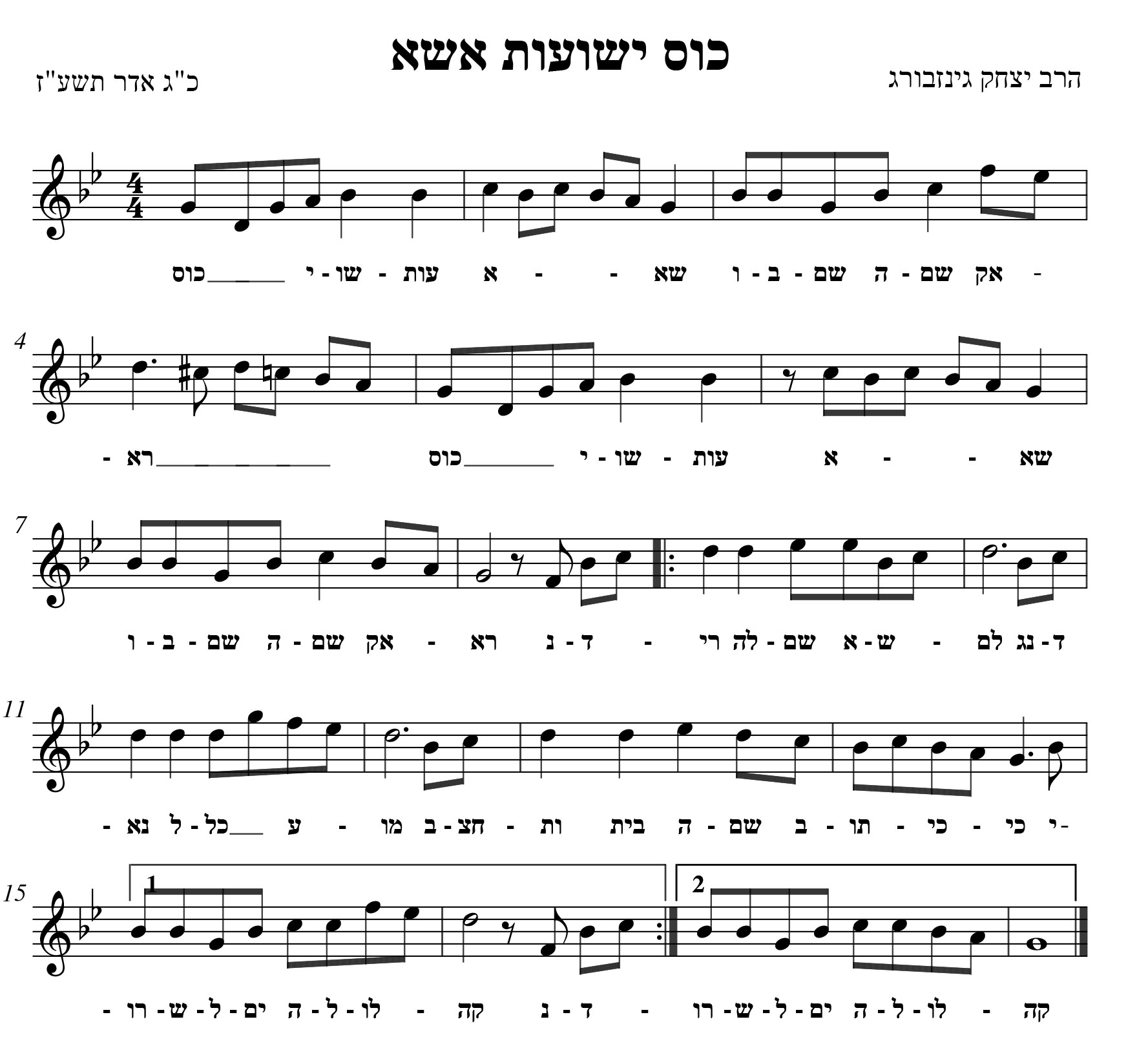
Musical score for Ginsburgh's Kos-Yeshuois melody

Ginsburgh began composing at a very young age. He has composed hundreds of songs and original melodies in the Chassidic tradition. He has also composed a number of musical compositions in the genre of world music. His music has been published in dozens of discs, which include discs that conserve Chassidic songs and melodies from bygone eras.

Rabbi Ginsburgh has appeared and sung together with Rabbi Shlomo Carlebach.

Russian violin virtuoso Sanya Kroytor has performed renderings of some of Rabbi Ginsburgh's compositions, and has played violin accompaniment to Rabbi Ginsburgh singing the Chassidic melody Tzama Lecha Nafshi.

Ginsburgh's compositions are performed by a number of musicians and singers, including Shuli Rand, Erez Lev Ari, Yosef Karduner, Yishai Ribo, Aharon Razel, Shlomo Katz, and Daniel Zamir.

Niggun Hitkashrut
A melody composed by Rabbi Ginsburgh

Israeli musician, Ariel Zilber, performs some of Ginsburgh's works.

Ginsburgh has also co-designed a number of pieces of Jewelry based on ancient Kabbalistic ideas, expressing love, peace and grace.

== Students ==
Over the years, Ginsburgh has accumulated a large number of students from all over the world.

In the 1980s, a group of ba'alei teshuvah crystallized around him, some of whom were inspired to found the Bat Ayin settlement in Gush Etzion. Following the death of Rabbi Tzvi Yehuda Kook, another group of students joined him from the Merkaz Harav yeshivah. They sought to fill the gap left by their rabbi's death by heading for new spiritual horizons in Kabbalah and Chassidut. They founded the original Od Yosef Chai yeshivah at Joseph's Tomb, and sought a significant spiritual leader in these spiritual fields to serve as their head. Ginsburgh later conceded to their request to join them as their rosh yeshivah.

In Israel today, there are communities of his students in Jerusalem, Bat Ayin, Yitzhar, Kfar Chabad, and Rechovot. His students include Charedim, religious Zionists, and Chabad Chassidim, as well as ba'alei teshuva.

Amongst the most notable are:

- Rabbi Shalom Arush, Head of the Chut shel Chesed Yeshivah and Institute.
- David Refael ben Ami, Israeli singer.
- Meir Ettinger, activist known for leading Hilltop Youth
- Shlomo Kalish, hi-tech investor.
- Daniel Shalit, conductor, composer and doctor of musicology.
- Yitzhak Shapira, rabbi of Yitzhar.
- Shmuel Yaniv, Chief Rabbi of Givat Shmuel, Israel and author of books on Bible codes.
- Eliezer Zeiger, professor emeritus at the University of California, Los Angeles and executive director of the Torah Science Foundation. Zeiger has been a student of Rabbi Ginsburgh since 1992. Together, Ginsburgh and Zeiger have co-authored integrative Torah biology textbooks for Jewish high schools on nutrition and the nervous system.
- Ariel Zilber, Israeli musician and songwriter.

== Religious and political views ==
Ginsburgh advocates the reinstitution of Jewish monarchy in the Land of Israel. Some of his own followers want him to be the king. He opposes efforts to remove Jewish settlements from the West Bank and encourages his followers to attempt to dissuade soldiers and police officers from carrying out evacuations. He advocates "Jewish labor" − the idea that under the current state of affairs in the land of Israel, Jews should employ other Jews. In accordance with Maimonides' ruling and many rabbinical authorities, he believes that taking the current security risks into consideration, Gentiles should not be allowed to live in the Land of Israel, unless they become the "righteous of the nations".

Ginsburgh also supports the rebuilding of the Jewish temple, believing that this would facilitate spiritual elevation and hasten redemption. Following a response from the Lubavitcher Rebbe, he does not currently advocate visiting the Temple Mount, the site of the Dome of the Rock and Al-Aqsa Mosque.

Ginsburgh has repeatedly said that he does not promote violence. His students say that they seek to actualize the messianic vision not by violent revolution, but by a change of consciousness that will take place within individuals and will eventually encompass the collective. In his 2007 book Kabbalah and Meditation for the Nations Ginsburgh writes, "Ours is the first generation in modern times to understand the truly universal human condition and to seek to bring all peoples of the earth together in peace and harmony." In April 2014, after the confiscation of the Od Yosef Chai Yeshivah complex following assaults by residents on an IDF unit, Gershon Mesika, then head of the Shomron Council, visited Rabbi Ginsburgh in his home in Kfar Chabad together with a group of rabbis headed by the Chief Rabbi of the Shomron Elyakim Levanon. During the visit, Ginsburgh expressed his opposition to causing any harm to IDF soldiers.

=== Time to Crack the Nut ===
Ginsburgh's theocratic worldview is to take control of Israel's state institutions to pave the way for the Messiah's arrival. Ginsburgh details his approach in an essay Time to Crack the Nut (in Hebrew). Using Kabbalistic imagery, he compares Israel to a walnut surrounded by four shells or Qlippoth, which represent the forces of darkness and impurity. The outermost shell is (secular) Zionist thought which may not align with the vision of a religious theocracy. The second shell is the judicial system, the courts, the media and the education system which in his view promote negative values, i.e. universal values like liberalism, assimilation and equality between Jews and Arabs. The third shell comprises government apparatuses including the Knesset, which are considered dangerous because they allow for compromise and territorial withdrawal. The fourth and innermost shell is the army, which Ginsburgh deems necessary with changes such as soldiers ignoring the principle of purity of arms if it contradicts the will of God. According to Ginsburgh, the first three shells must be crushed by dismantling Zionist-secular ideology and overthrowing the government in order to pave the way for a Torah-based rule. This way of thinking is similar to ISIS and Al-Qaida, except Ginsburgh would impose a halakhic-style regime instead of sharia law.

=== Violence against Palestinians ===
In 1989, following the arrest of seven of his students after the shooting of an Arab girl during a settler rampage through the Palestinian West Bank village of Kifl Haris (in response to rock-throwing by the Arab villagers), Ginsburgh reportedly "offered biblical justification for the view that the spilling of non-Jewish blood was a lesser offense than the spilling of Jewish blood." He stated that threatening to kill Jews comes under the ruling, 'He who comes to kill you, you should kill him first.' The Ashkenazi chief rabbi Avraham Shapira criticized Ginsburgh's views. In 1993 Ginsburgh defended another student of his guilty of firing indiscriminately at Arab labourers in Tel Aviv.

In 1994, Ginsburgh received widespread criticism for his article "Baruch Hagever" in which he defended Baruch Goldstein who had massacred 29 Palestinian worshippers at the Cave of the Patriarchs in Hebron. Rabbi Ginsburgh wrote that it is possible to view Baruch Goldstein's act as either following or defying five Halachic principles, namely "sanctification of God's name", "saving life" (referring to allegations that Goldstein had received prior warning from the IDF regarding a planned Arab massacre of Jews), "revenge", "eradication of the seed of Amalek" and "war". The conclusion to the article is that Goldstein's act emanated from the super-rational powers of his soul, therefore one cannot rely on logical reasoning to determine whether the act was worthy or condemnable.

The Jerusalem Post asserted that Ginsburgh had called the massacre a mitzvah. Motti Inbari commented on this:

In his writings, Ginzburg (sic) gives prominence to Halachic and kabbalistic approaches that emphasize the distinction between Jew and non-Jew (Gentile), imposing a clear separation and hierarchy in this respect. He claims that while the Jews are the Chosen People and were created in God's image, the Gentiles do not have this status... Ginzburg stated that, on the theoretical level, if a Jew requires a liver transplant to survive, it would be permissible to seize a Gentile and take their liver forcefully. From this point only a small further step is required to actively encourage and support the killing of non-Jews, as Ginzburg did in the case of Goldstein.

Ginsburgh responded to claims that he permits the murder of non-Jews:

Never did I advocate taking non-Jewish life, except when tragically forced by war. The Torah forbids this, emphasizing that ALL human life is sacred. It is our task, as G-d's chosen people to enlighten all humanity and raise the consciousness of mankind to fully recognize the sanctity of all life... When G-d deemed it necessary that the Egyptians drown in the Red Sea to save and liberate His chosen people, Israel, He nonetheless forbade His ministering angels to rejoice at the death of the Egyptians, His own creations. The Torah instructs us to "emulate His ways" of mercy and loving kindness to all.

On March 10, 1996, Ginsburgh was arrested for administrative detention for 60 days for his pronouncements that the state should take action against Arabs in response to the recent wave of terror attacks. An article in the Jewish Week stated that the detention was "an attempt to stifle Rabbi Ginsburgh's teaching and lectures to his followers". After an appeal against the detention, on March 28 Ginsburgh was released without charge. The judge declared that the accusations were baseless and that Ginsburgh was not a danger to the public. Prior to the court ruling, the government had circulated to all its embassies abroad a statement that Ginsburgh had "a long record of incitement to violence, inflammatory rhetoric, and has developed a theology of revenge whose tenets he spreads wherever he can." Following his release, Ginsburgh wrote, "The court recognized that my arrest entailed not only a violation of freedom of speech, but an attack against teaching Torah in general and Chassidic philosophy in particular."

In 2003, Ginsburgh was indicted on charges of encouraging racism against Arabs in his booklet "Tsav Hasha'a – Tipul Shoresh" (טִיפּוּל שׁוֹרֶשׁ, "Order of the Day – Root Treatment"). The charges were dropped after he issued a clarification letter. In 2010, the Israeli newspaper Haaretz called Ginsburgh "a well known radical on his views on Israel Arab public." A former head of the Shin Bet, Carmi Gillon, told The Forward in 2016 that, in his view, "[Ginsburgh's] words count as incitement and he should have faced charges a long time ago."

In 2009 Ginsburgh wrote an endorsing introduction to the first volume of the highly controversial book Torat Hamelekh. The volume, which endorses the killing of innocent children as a way to take revenge on their parents, and has been condemned by spokespeople for both the Conservative and Reform movements and the Anti-Defamation League is said by its authors to have been based on Ginsburgh’s ideas.

In April 2014, Ginsburgh called price-tag acts of vandalism "unsupervised acts", and stated that there is no need to use hands-on tactics. Instead, he suggested achieving goals by power of word alone, speaking out firmly but calmly to transmit the message. The following month the Shin Bet claimed that the price-tag acts were the handiwork of about 100 individuals who were inspired by Ginsburgh's ideas. Tzvi Sukkot, self-identified as a prior "hill top youth", says that it was Rabbi Ginsburgh who convinced him to stop his violent activities against Arabs and find more legitimate ways to express his frustration. "Ginsburgh spoke out very clearly against violence. He said that we should act... within the framework of the law." Ginsburgh and his students have responded to the accusations made against him by stating that he has been misunderstood and that his words have been taken out of context.

"The wicked acts of the people of Gaza underscores their Amalek-like features," he wrote in his "Niflaot" pamphlet a few weeks after the Oct. 7 massacre. These features, he added, "demands that we observe the command 'Blot out the memory of Amalek from under heaven, you shall not forget it' – total annihilation, not sifting," that is not checking who is innocent and who is guilty.

== List of works in English ==
- The Hebrew Letters: Channels of Creative Consciousness (1995, hardcover, 501 pp.)
- The Mystery of Marriage: How to Find Love and Happiness in Married Life (1999, hardcover, 499 pp.)
- Awakening the Spark Within: Five Dynamics of Leadership That Can Change the World (2001, hardcover, 200 pp.)
- Transforming Darkness into Light: Kabbalah and Psychology (2002, hardcover, 192 pp.)
- Rectifying the State of Israel: A Political Platform Based on Kabbalah (2002, hardcover, 230 pp.)
- Living in Divine Space: Kabbalah and Meditation (2003, hardcover, 288 pp.)
- Body, Mind, Soul: Kabbalah on Human Physiology, Disease and Healing (2004, hardcover, 341 pp.)
- Consciousness & Choice: Finding Your Soulmate (2004, hardcover, 283 pp.)
- The Art of Education: Integrating Ever-New Horizons (2005, hardcover, 303 pp.)
- What You Need to Know About Kabbalah (2006, hardcover, 190 pp.)
- Kabbalah and Meditation for the Nations (2007, hardcover 200 pp.)
- Anatomy of the Soul (2008, hardcover 144 pp.)
- A Sense of the Supernatural: Interpretation of Dreams and Paranormal Experiences (2008, hardcover 207pp.)
- Lectures on Torah and Modern Physics (2013, hardcover 180pp.)
- The Wondering Jew: Mystical Musings & Inspirational Insights (2014, softcover 275pp.)
- 913: The Secret Wisdom of Genesis (2015, hardcover 157pp.)
- Frames of Mind: Motivation According to Kabbalah (2015, softcover 255pp.)
- The Twinkle in Your Eye: Kabbalistic Remedies for Preserving Youth and Memory (2017, hardcover 203pp.)
- Wisdom: Integrating Torah and Science; coauthored with Rabbi Moshe Genuth (2018, hardcover 218pp.)
- The Breath of Life: Torah, Intelligent Design and Evolution (2018, hardcover 286pp.)
- 137: The Riddle of Creation (2018, hardcover 399pp.)
- The Inner Dimension: Insight into the Weekly Torah Portion (2021, hardcover 418pp.)

== Partial list of works in Hebrew ==
- Adamah Shamayim Tehom, 5759 (1999, hardcover, 374 pp.)
- Ahava, 5771 (2010, hardcover, 264 pp.)
- Al Yisrael Ga'avato, 5759 (1999, hardcover, pp. 392)
- Ani L'Dodi, 5758 (1998, hardcover, 188 pp.)
- Anochi V'HaYeladim, 5759 (1999, hardcover, 126 pp.)
- B'Ita Achisheina, 5763 (2003, hardcover, 372 pp.)
- Brit Hanisuin, 5757 (1997, hardcover, 142 pp.)
- Chasdei David HaNe'emanim, 5764 (2004, hardcover, 500–600 pp. ea. 11 vols.)
- Chatan Im Kallah, 5765 (2005, hardcover, 354 pp.)
- Einayich Breichot B'Cheshbon, 5771 (2010, hardcover, 288pp.)
- Eisa Einai, 5758 (1998, hardcover, 412 pp.)
- El Olam Hakabala, 5768 (2008, hardcover, 280 pp.)
- Emunah v'Muda'ut, 5759 (1999, hardcover, 324 pp.)
- Guf Nefesh V'Neshama, 5767 (2007, hardcover, 306 pp.)
- HaNefesh, 5767 (2007, hardcover, 424 pp.)
- HaTeva HaYehudi, 5765 (2005, hardcover, 250 pp.)
- Hameimad Hapenimi, 5774 (2014, softcover, 312 pp.)
- Hazman Hapenimi, 5775 (2015, softcover, 375 pp.)
- Herkavta Enosh L'Rosheinu, 5744 (1984, hardcover, 78 pp.)
- K'Matmonim Techapsena, 5768 (2008, hardcover, 220 pp. ea. 2 vols.)
- Klal Gadol B'Torah, 5759 (1999, hardcover, 202 pp.)
- Kumi Ori, 5766 (2006, hardcover, 274 pp.)
- Lahafoch Et Hachoshech L'or, 5764 (2004, hardcover, 204 pp.)
- Lechiyot B'Merchav HaEloki, 5767 (2007, hardcover, 210 pp.)
- Lechiyot Im HaZman – Breishit, Shemot, 5770 (2010, hardcover,~300 pp. ea 2 vols.)
- Lev Ladaat, 5750 (1990, hardcover, 230 pp.)
- Maamarei HaRebbe MiLubavitch, 5769 (2009, hardcover, 174 pp.)
- Maayan Ganim – Parshat HaShavua, 5762 (2002, hardcover,~220 pp. ea. 4 vols.)
- Machol HaKramim, 5767 (2007, hardcover, 166 pp.)
- Malchut Yisrael, 5756 (2006, hardcover, 1244 pp. 3 vols.)
- Melech B'Yofyo, 5766 (2006, hardcover, 248 pp.)
- Mevo L'Kabbalat HaAriza"l, 5766 (2006, hardcover, 330 pp.)
- Mivchar Shiurei Hitbonnenut, 5768 (2008, hardcover, ~ 250 pp. ea. 21 vols.)
- Mudaut Tivit, 5759 (1999, hardcover, 192 pp.)
- Nefesh Briah, 5764 (2004, softcover, 140 pp.)
- Or Yisrael, 5766 (2006, hardcover, 768 pp.)
- Otiot Lashon HaKodesh, 5769 (2009, hardcover, 480 pp.)
- Otzar HaNefesh, 5770 (2010, softcover, 254 pp. ea. 3 vols.)
- Panim El Panim, 5760 (2000, hardcover, 312 pp.)
- Rucho Shel Mashiach, 5764 (2004, hardcover, 440 pp.)
- Sha'arei Ahava V'Ratzon, 5756 (1996, Hardcover, 278 pp.)
- Shechinah Beinehem, 5752 (1992, hardcover, 208 pp.)
- Shiurim B'Sefer Sod Hashem Lirei'av, 5771 (2010, hardcover, 420 pp.)
- Shlosha Ketarim, 5770 (2010, hardcover, 440 pp.)
- Sod Hashem Lirei'av, 5745 (1985, hardcover, 572 pp.)
- Teshuvat HaShana, 5757 (1997, hardcover, 316 pp.)
- Tikkun HaMedinah,5765 (2005, hardcover, 196 pp.)
- Tom V'Daat, 5764 (2004, hardcover, 418 pp.)
- Tzav HaSha'ah – Tipul Shoresh, 5761 (2001, softcover, 162 pp.)
- U'Mimena Yivashea, 5766 (2006, hardcover, 146 pp.)
- Yayin Mesameach, 5764 (2004, hardcover, 160 pp. ea. 5 vols.)
- Yayin Yitzchak, 5770 (2010, hardcover, 476 pp.)

== Discography ==
- Chassidic Nigunim (Melodies) 1–12, Arrangements and Piano: R. Ferency.
- Escorting the Shabbat Queen, Sung by Rabbi Yitzchak Ginsburgh.
- Medidative Melodies for Chanukah, compiled and sung by Rabbi Yitzchak Ginsburgh, violin: Mordechai Brodsky.
- Music's Hidden Soul, Chassidic melodies by Rabbi Yitzchak Ginsburgh, arranged by Doron Toister
- My Entire Being, Chassidic songs sung by Rabbi Shneur Zalman Levine,
- Niggunei Chen, Eleven Mystic Melodies of Faith by Rabbi Yitzchak Ginsburgh, violin: Mordechai Brodsky.
- Perek Shirah, the Song of Creation, composed and sung with children by Rabbi Yitzchak Ginsburgh.
- Praise His Name with Dance, composed by Rabbi Yitzchak Ginsburgh.
- Purim All Year Round, composed by Rabbi Yitzchak Ginsburgh.
- Quill of the Soul I-II, Chassidic Melodies by Rabbi Yitzchak Ginsburgh, arranged by Yonatan Goodman.
- Quill of the Soul III-IV, Chassidic Melodies by Rabbi Yitzchak Ginsburgh, arranged by Yonatan Goodman.
- Shabbat Night Melodies, Chassidic Nigunim composed and sung by Rabbi Yitzchak Ginsburgh, violin: Mordechai Brodsky
- Simchat Olam, composed by Rabbi Yitzchak Ginsburgh.
- Umka Deliba, Composed and sung by Rabbi Yitzchak Ginsburgh.
