= Price tag attack policy =

Acts of vandalism and violence committed by extremist Israeli settler youths

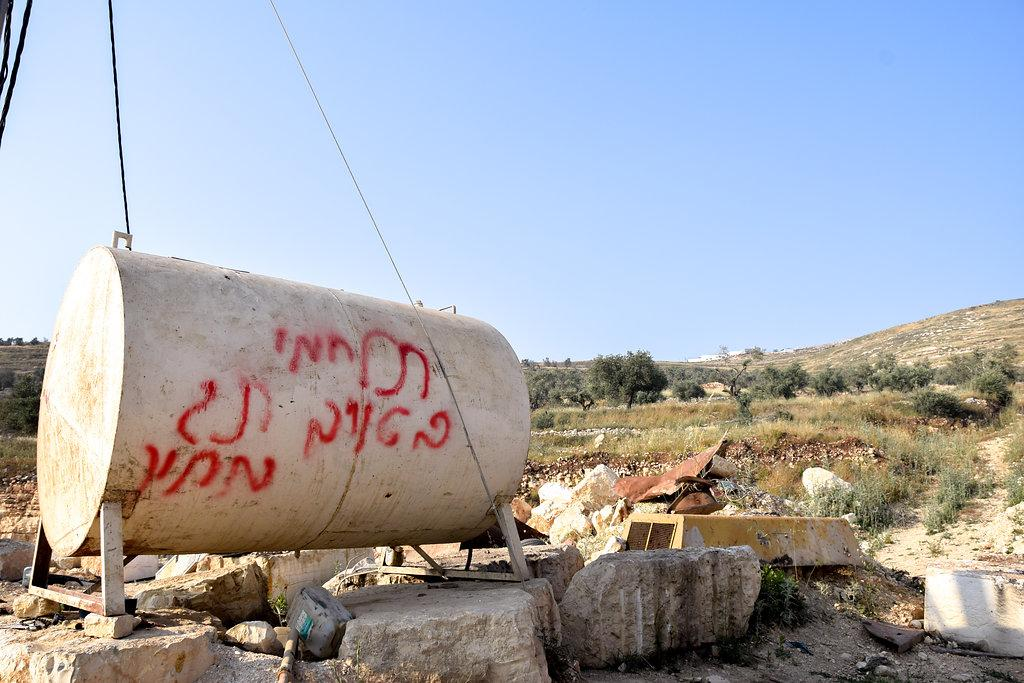
- "Fight the enemy; price tag." Graffiti spray-painted by Israeli settlers in ‘Urif
- Native name: מדיניות תג מחיר
- Location: Occupied West Bank
- Date: 23 July 2008 – present
- Target: Palestinians
- Perpetrator: Hilltop Youth

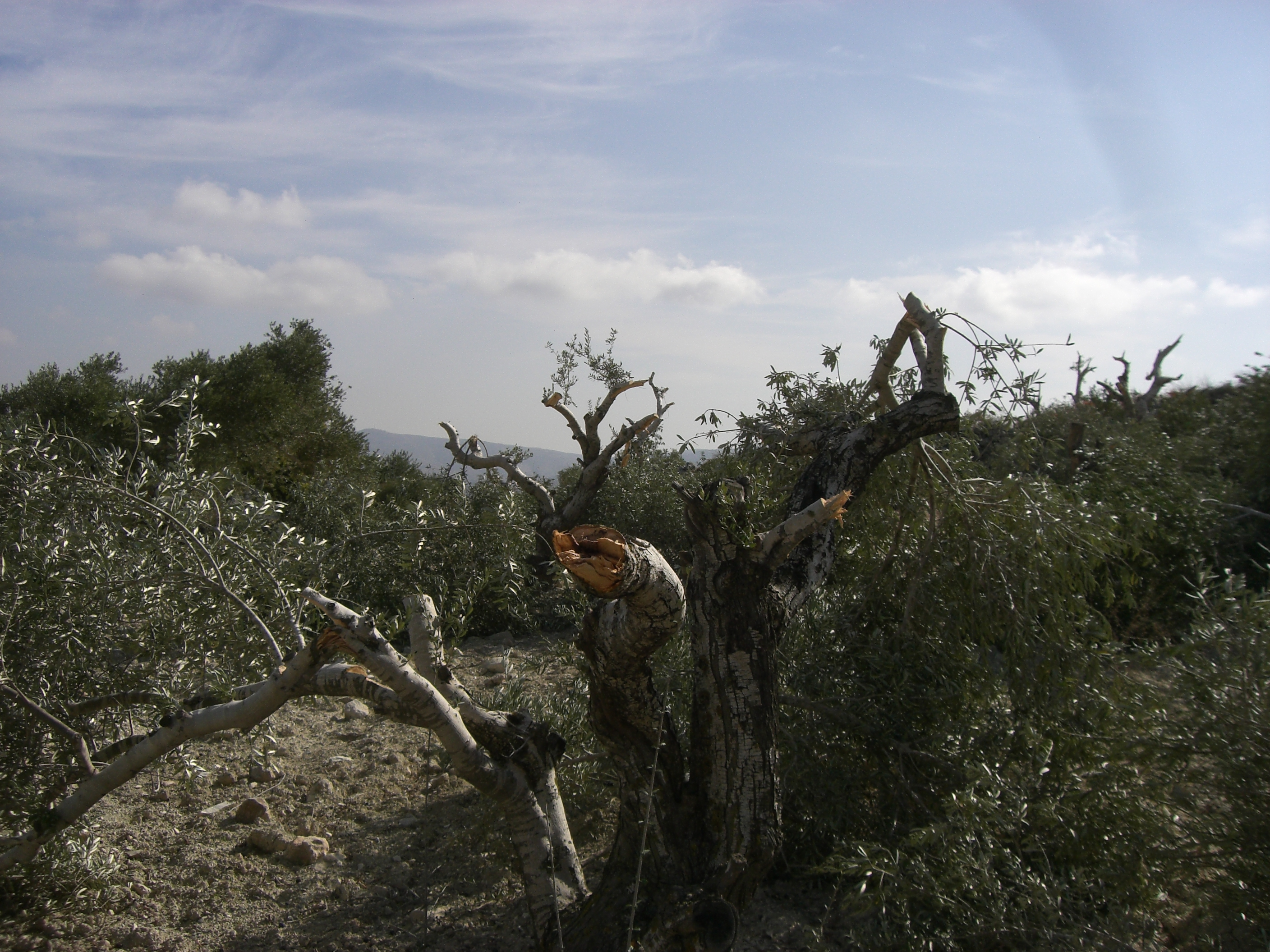
Olive tree in the village of Burin which was stated to be vandalized by settlers from Yitzhar

The price tag attack policy (Hebrew: מדיניות תג מחיר), also sometimes referred to as mutual responsibility (אחריות הדדית), is the name originally given to the attacks and acts of vandalism committed primarily in the occupied West Bank by extremist Israeli settler youths against Palestinian Arabs, and to a lesser extent, against left-wing Israeli Jews, Israeli Arabs, Christians, and Israeli security forces. The youths officially claim that the acts are committed to "exact a price from local Palestinians or from the Israeli security forces for any action taken against their settlement enterprise".

B'Tselem has documented many acts of this kind, which have included violent attacks carried out against random Palestinian civilians, burning of mosques and fields, stone throwing, uprooting trees, and incursions into Palestinian villages and land. These actions come as retaliation for Palestinian acts of violence against settlers, or decisions by the Israeli government to curb Jewish construction in the West Bank, where 80% of the attacks take place, while some 10–15% take place in the area of Jerusalem. Such vandalism also embraces damaging the property, or injuring members of the Israel Police and the Israel Defense Forces, and defacing the homes of left-wing activists.

The Israel Security Agency, known as Shin Bet, estimates of the extent of the perpetrator group vary: one figure calculates that from several hundred to about 3,000 people implement the price tag policy, while a recent analysis sets the figure at a few dozen individuals, organized in small close-knit and well-organised cells and backed by a few hundred right-wing activists. Yizhar Hess, comparing hate crimes against Arabs in Israel and antisemitic acts against Jews in France, notes that incidents of price tag attacks are proportionately higher, and argues that price tag acts are Israel's antisemitism. The roots of the price tag policy were traced to the August 2005 dismantling of settlements in the Gaza Strip as part of Israel's unilateral disengagement plan. Ever since then, extreme right wing settlers have sought to establish a "balance of terror", in which every state action aimed at them generates an immediate violent reaction. The definition of such acts as terroristic, however, is the subject of considerable political controversy in Israel.

The "price tag" concept and violence have been publicly rejected by Israeli officials, including Prime Minister Benjamin Netanyahu, who have demanded that those responsible be brought to justice. Cabinet member Benny Begin stated: "These people are scoundrels, but we have not been terribly successful in catching them." Many people across the political spectrum in Israel have denounced such attacks and some have made efforts to redress the harm. The attacks are widely reported in the Arab media, and have been strongly condemned by the Organization of the Islamic Conference. The settler leadership have "fiercely condemned" the price tag policy, and the vast majority of Yesha rabbis have expressed their reservations about it. According to Shin Bet, the vast majority of the settlers also reject such actions.

== Terminology ==
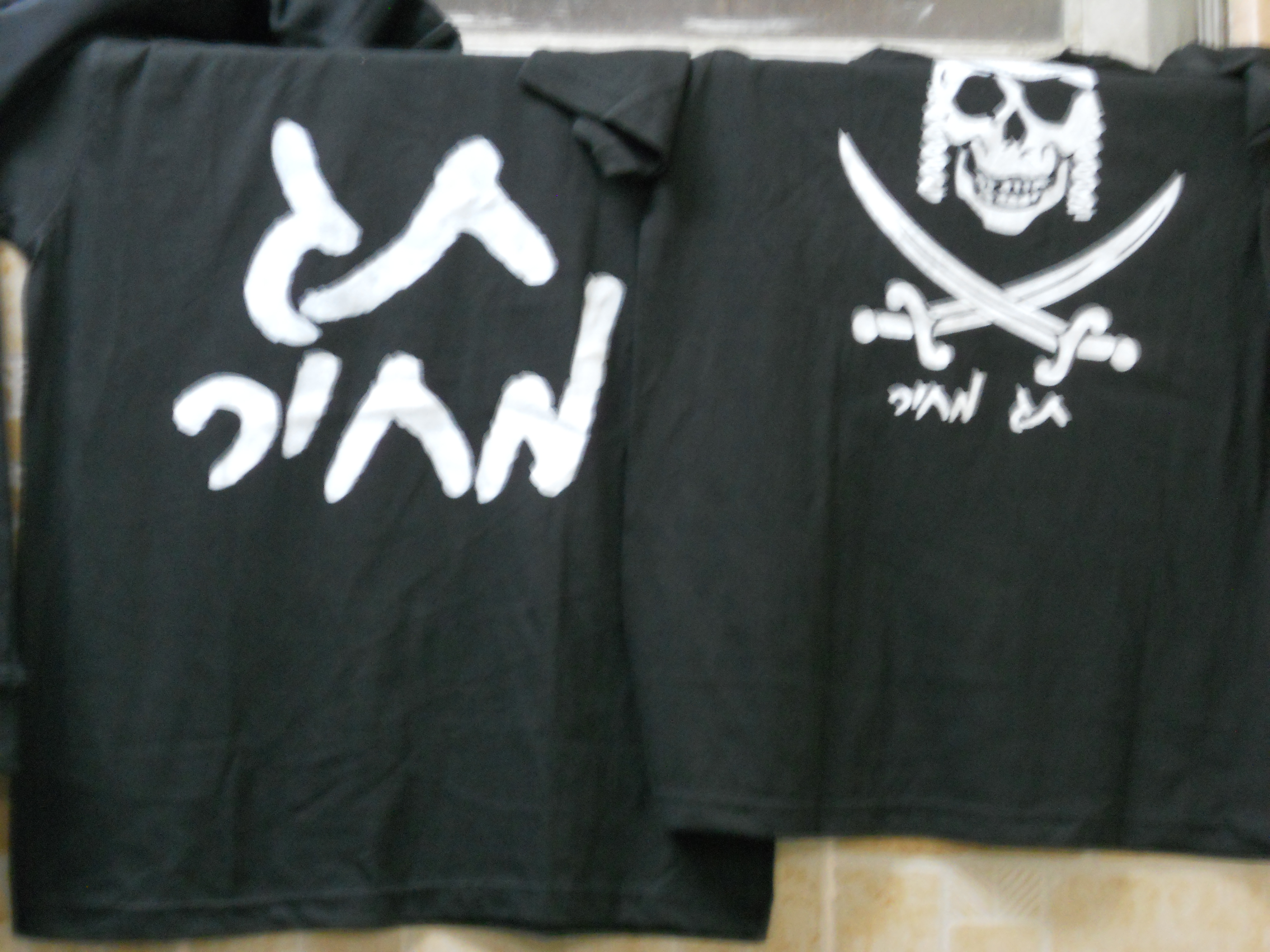
Price tag shirts, 2012

The acts also referred to as "tactic", "strategy", "doctrine", "campaign", or "principle". The term "price tag attack" now extends to acts of vandalism, and especially to acts of anti-Arab vandalism, suspected to be the work of lone individuals, against the Israeli army and security services, as well as against Christian and Muslim places of worship, and also against left-wing institutions that criticize settlers. In May 2014, Shin Bet said the price-tag hate crimes were the handiwork of about 100 individuals mainly hailing from the Yitzhar settlement and hilltop outposts, and were inspired by the ideas of rabbi Yitzchak Ginsburgh.

One objection to the use of the term is that it dehumanizes Palestinians. Ron Ben-Tovim argues that it is a supermarket label used as a euphemism for violent acts aimed to instill terror into the hearts of Palestinians, applied to acts against Palestinians by Jews, whereas it is standard in Israeli usage to brand all acts perpetrated by Palestinians against Israeli Jews as terrorism. "Cutting off the head of the terror snake" and "tentacles of terror" are commonly used metaphors. To use a special term, "price tag" for acts of violence against Palestinians is to reduce the terror to a message by settlers to their government, and ignore the victim.

The price-tag campaign includes attacks on Palestinian villages and property by Israeli settlers as retaliation for attacks on Israeli targets and for government demolition of structures at West Bank settlements and the removal of outposts which are variously described as being either unauthorised or illegal, and in recent years (2012–2013), dozens of such attacks have targeted Christian sites and the Christian community in Jerusalem. They generally follow actions by Israeli authorities that are perceived as harming the settlement enterprise, or follow Palestinian violence against settlers.

== History of the price tag policy ==
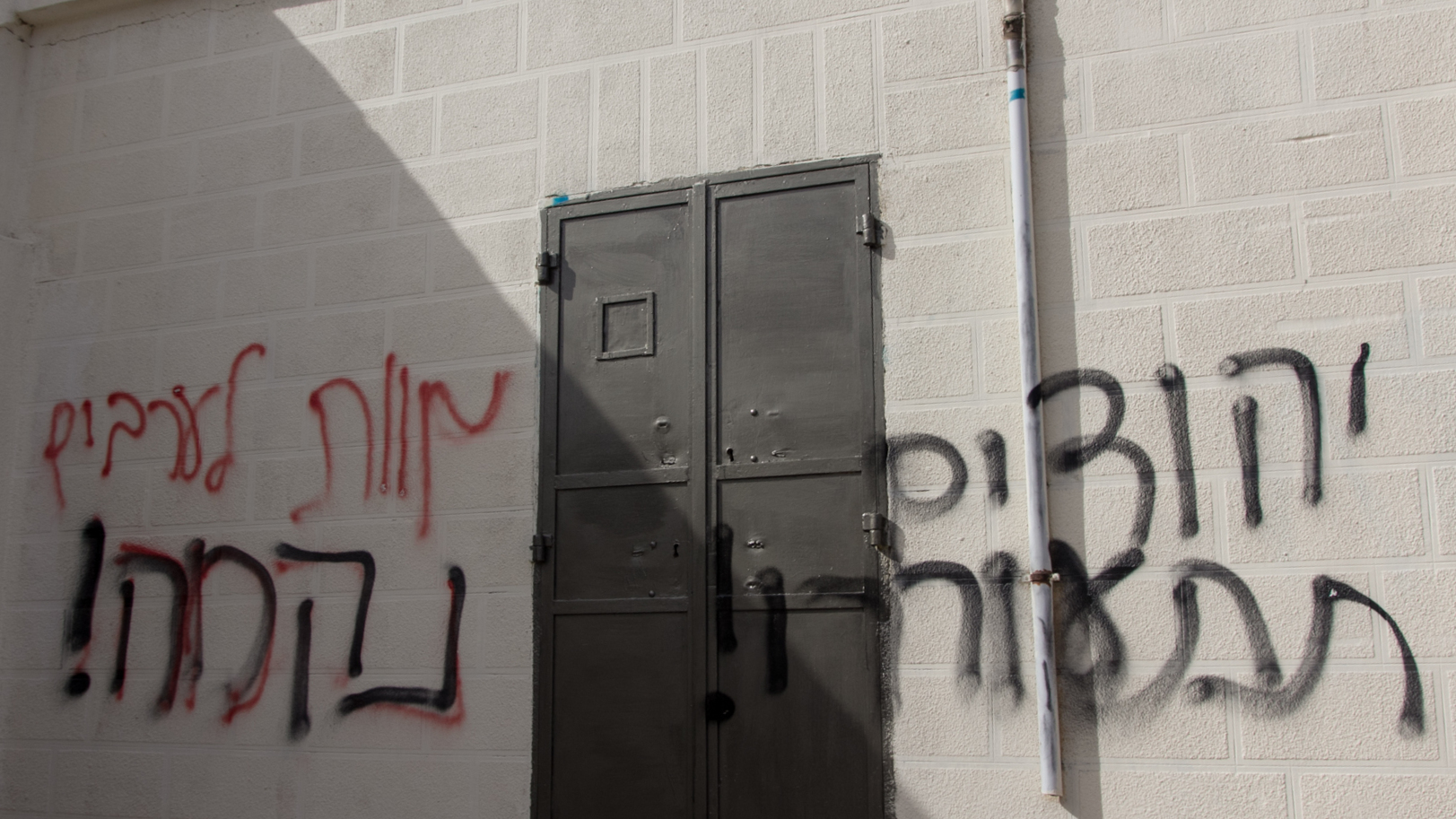
Graffiti on a Palestinian house outside Ma'ale Levona. "Jews Wake Up!", "Death to the Arabs", "Revenge!" (31 January 2014)

According to the military correspondent of the Israeli newspaper Haaretz Amos Harel, the roots of the policy go back to Ariel Sharon's policy of disengagement from Gaza in August 2005 and the demolition in 2006 of the illegal settlement at Amona. The expression is occasionally used for acts that took place before this date, to denote a retributive act. Gideon Levy, for example, describes the settlement of Mitzpe Yair, established in 1998 after the murder of settler Yair Har-Sinai, as "an early 'price tag' operation – an act of retribution for some incident." The term has also been used to describe Israeli retaliative policy against Palestinians, and on behalf of the settler enterprise, by describing PM Benjamin Netanyahu's decision to permit Jews to move into a contested property, Machpela House, in response to the shooting of an Israeli border policeman near the Tomb of the Patriarchs in Hebron.

The Kahane Chai member and IDF soldier Eden Natan-Zada's gunning down of Israeli Arabs on a bus in the town of Shfar'am, in which four Arabs were killed and twenty-two were wounded, took place on 4 August 2005, just before the Gaza evacuation. It has been interpreted as a possible price-tag assault aimed at provoking riots that would make the IDF too busy to execute the evacuation on the Gaza Strip. Later that same year, Asher Weisgan of the Shiloh settlement killed four Palestinians in a similar terror attack perpetrated as a "protest" at the withdrawal from Amona.

According to Harel, since the Gaza and Amona withdrawals:

the extreme right has sought to establish a 'balance of terror', in which every state action aimed at them – from demolishing a caravan in an outpost to restricting the movements of those suspected of harassing Palestinian olive harvesters – generates an immediate, violent reaction.

In July 2008, after the evacuation of a bus from the Israeli outpost of Adei Ad, followed by clashes between settler groups with Palestinians and the IDF, settler Itay Zar from the Israeli outpost of Havat Gilad alluded to the price-tag policy in stating: "Whenever an evacuation is carried out – whether it is a bus, a trailer or a small outpost – we will respond."

In the wake of the dismantlement of Noam Federman's farm outside Hebron in October 2008, opponents of the evacuation called for revenge attacks against the security forces, telling soldiers "you should all be defeated by your enemies, you should all become Gilad Shalit, you should all be killed, you should all be slaughtered, because that's what you deserve", and "set a price tag" on the event by stoning soldiers and local Palestinians, wounding two Israel Border Police officers, vandalizing cars, and destroying graves in a Muslim graveyard.

Price tag operations were originally envisaged as mobilizing actions by settlers throughout the West Bank – retaliating in the north when outposts in the south were threatened with dismantlement, and "exacting a price" in the south when outposts risked removal in the north. However, by 2009, though considerable damage was wrought to Palestinian property and persons, a coordinated north–south campaign still hadn't been realized. Price tag attacks could, furthermore, also be triggered purely on the basis of an announcement of government measures or by rumors of an imminent evacuation.

The acts of random violence generally follow actions by Israeli authorities that are perceived as harming the settlement enterprise, or follow Palestinian violence against settlers. "Price tag" acts include demonstrations, blocking of roads, clashes with Israeli security forces and even attacks against Israeli security forces personnel. Usually, however, the term refers to actions carried out by radical right-wing Israeli activists against Palestinians and their property. These include throwing stones at Palestinian cars, the torching of Palestinian fields and orchards, as well as the destruction and uprooting of trees belonging to Palestinians.

According to Israeli human rights group, Yesh Din, "The goal is to create a price for each evacuation, causing the Israeli authorities to think twice about carrying them out."

Towards the end of 2009, following an Israeli government decision to freeze any Israeli construction in the West Bank for a period of 10 months, several suspicious attacks were carried out in the West Bank, including the arson of a mosque in the Palestinian town of Yasuf, during which graffiti was sprayed on a building saying "Prepare for the price tag". The Shin Bet estimates of the extent of the perpetrator group vary: one figure calculates that from several hundred to about 3,000 people implement the price tag policy, while a recent analysis sets the figure at a few dozen individuals backed a few hundred right-wing activists. The vast majority of the settlers reject such actions, Shin Bet officials say. The perpetrators are organized in small close-knit and well-organised cells.

A 2009 summary report published by the Israel Police stated that during 2009 there was a decline in these types of attacks. According to a report of the Office for the Coordination of Humanitarian Affairs (OCHA) published in November 2009, if Israel were to begin evacuating settlements in the West Bank, 248,700 Palestinians living in 83 communities would be exposed to this policy, of which 22 communities with 75,900 inhabitants would be at high risk.

According to Yesh Din, which monitored a selection of incidents over 4 years, Israel Police did not file a single indictment following 69 cases that included price tag operations, where thousands of olive trees were burnt down between 2005 and 2009.

In an article published in May 2010, Zar stated that these actions represent a legitimate struggle which includes mainly the blocking of intersections and roads in order to disrupt the regular operations of Israeli security forces, preventing them from demolishing settler houses. Zar referred to the criminal activity involved in these actions as "marginal and uncontrolled acts".

According to Reuters, there was a 57% upswing in such attacks in the first seven months of 2011. No charges had yet been brought against suspects in price tag incidents.

A September 2011 article in The Economist suggested that one motive for these attacks might be to instigate violent Palestinian reaction, because the settlers are better-armed and believe that they could defeat the Palestinians.

In September 2011 the Shin Beit advised the government to withhold funding from one yeshiva, Od Yosef Chai in the settlement of Yitzhar, on the basis of intelligence reports that its rabbis encourage students to attack Arabs, including 'price tag' assaults.

Daniel Byman and Natan Sachs, writing for the Council on Foreign Relations's in-house journal Foreign Affairs, state that arson and the destruction of trees do not belong in the same category and aren't morally equivalent to suicide bombing though they, as well as Israeli politicians such as Moshe Ya'alon, define these acts of vandalism as a form of terrorism.

Price tag attacks have been made on Christian holy sites. In response to one on the Dormition Abbey on Mount Zion early in October 2012, Rabbi Gilad Kariv commented:"This price tag epidemic threatens to become a routine part of Israeli public life, causing moral, social and international damage. Law enforcement, which has failed to deal with the phenomenon, must make this a much higher priority than it has until now." In December 2012, two yarmulke-clad youths, one a candidate for the Shin Bet security service, handed out flyers, promoting price-tag attacks against Palestinians, at an IDF induction centre in Tel Hashomer. The IDF issued a statement condemning political propaganda within the army, the centre was notified and the distribution of flyers stopped.

In June 2013, according to Zehava Gal-On, the Israeli Cabinet was pressured, despite a recommendation by the Attorney-General to the contrary, to define perpetrators of such attacks as members of "forbidden organizations" as opposed to "terror groups". The implications are significant, in that belonging to the latter carries prison sentences of up to 20 years, whereas "forbidden organizations" only risk confiscation of their property, and under the definition, arrested members of price tag activist groups can avoid criminal prosecution.

Settlers have used the term to describe Israeli government operations that demolish the illegal structures they have built.

=== Allegations of staged price tag attacks ===
Settlers have at times claimed that Palestinians cut down trees on their own land and blame settlers.

In 2011 two boys from the Arab village of Beit Zarzir admitted that they had sprayed swastikas and "Death to Arabs" on the walls of their school. In May 2011 the Israel Police arrested several members of the Israeli-Arab Bakri family from Jaffa under the suspicion of plotting to kill an imam in the Hassan Bek Mosque in Jaffa, due to a business dispute. The murder was intended to appear as a "price tag" attack carried out by Israeli right-wing activists.

Israeli settlers were accused by an Arab farmer of having gathered his sheep into an area thick with brush and setting fire to the bushes, burning alive his 12 pregnant ewes. This claim was supported by the Israeli human rights group B'Tselem and reported by the Palestinian Ma'an News Agency and Israeli newspaper Haaretz. The police questioned the farmer's description of religious settlers wearing skullcaps driving a car on Sabbath as most Orthodox Jews do not drive on this day. Caroline Glick writing in The Jerusalem Post reported that the farmer later admitted that he lost control of a brush fire that was responsible for the damage.

Two 15-year-old Bedouin students of Beit Zarzir confessed, after being arrested in March 2012, their responsibility for damaging a school for Arab and Jewish students, and spraying on the wall of the school, "Death to Arabs", "price tag", and" "Holocaust to the Arabs".

In February 2013, Israel Police investigated an incident in the Qusra village, where six cars were vandalized. A Palestinian was later arrested.

In January 2014, near Eli, a settler said he photographed Palestinians chopping down an olive tree. A later report on Ma'an News blamed 'settlers' for the incident.

=== Jewish settler stages fake Palestinian attack ===
In July 2013, an Israeli settler was arrested by police for staging a 'price tag' assault on his own car. While visiting his family at the Kiryat Moshe neighbourhood in Jerusalem, he phoned the police to complain that someone had slashed the tires of his car and sprayed it with Arabic graffiti reading 'slaughter the Jews' (itbah al-Yahud). Investigations led to an admission that he himself was responsible for the damage and the motivation for the act was to "raise awareness" about Arab price tag acts conducted against Jews.

== Police investigations ==
The Israeli government has set up a national task force, forming part of the elite Lahav police unit, to coordinate investigations and gather intelligence on these attacks. Allocated 80 positions, the price tag crimes unit has, after 18 months, filled them with 30 police officers, only for operations in the West Bank.

After a number of mosques were torched over 2011, all suspects subsequently detailed were later released, since law enforcement officers encountered difficulties in securing evidence against them. Dan Halutz, former Chief of Staff of the Israel Defense Forces, in June 2012, commented to Army Radio that the authorities were not doing enough to crack down on "price tag" vandalism, or what he called "counterterrorism". "If we wanted, we could catch them and when we want to, we will," he added.

The opposition leader in the Knesset, Shelly Yachimovich, commented in mid-June, after another tire-slashing price tag attack on Palestinian vehicles that "It is not logical that Israel, which is blessed with intelligence and operational capabilities that are among the best in the world, cannot catch an extremist group that causes indescribable damage."

In response to such allegations, a Shin Bet officer has stated that finding culprits for price tag incidents is extremely difficult because the hilltop youth believed to be behind much of the vandalism are harder to penetrate and recruit as informers than has been the case with Hamas and Islamic Jihad militants. In January 2014, following an incident in which a groups of vandals from an illegal settlement near Esh Kodesh were captured by Palestinian villagers and handed over to the IDF, Uri Misgav wrote that "the strongest army in the Middle East along with the Shin Bet security service, with all its effectiveness, have not been able to rein in" the settler militia thought responsible for these assaults "over all these long years".

In February 2015, the Lod District Court convicted a West bank settler, Binyamin Richter, of a racially inspired hate attack, for what it deemed a 'price tag' attack in 2013. Richter was sentenced to 3 years imprisonment, and ordered him to compensate the proprietors of the damaged property to the tune of $3,900.

In January 2016, Corporal Elad Sela, an Etzion Brigade soldier from the settlement of Bat Ayin, who had been arrested in March 2015, was sentenced to 3 years and 9 months imprisonment for passing on secret information to price tag activists concerning future IDF operations.

== Legal redress ==
In 2006, the Supreme Court of Israel laid down a decision that the State was obliged to "devote manpower for the protection of Palestinian property, must open an immediate inquiry when reports of harassment are received, and send out patrols by security forces to locate such activities." In one recent case, the Amour family sued for compensation after their olive grove near at-Tuwani, and the settlements of Ma'on and Havat Ma'on, was subject to a price tag assault. Unknown vandals had cut down 120 trees in 2006; a further tree was felled and the fencing destroyed in 2011; and on 9 May 2013 half of the trees were chopped down and a slogan left reading: "price tag is fed up with thieves – mutual responsibility" and "regards from Eviatar". After initial requests for action from the Civil Administration were ignored, the family filed a claim for damages on the basis of negligence. The state replied to the petition by contending that most of the blame play with the plaintiff, since the Amour family had failed to take appropriate measures to prevent the incident. It further said that the vandals' acts were not sanctioned by the state of Israel. The IDF is investigating the matter.

== Israeli reactions ==
=== Official Israeli reactions ===
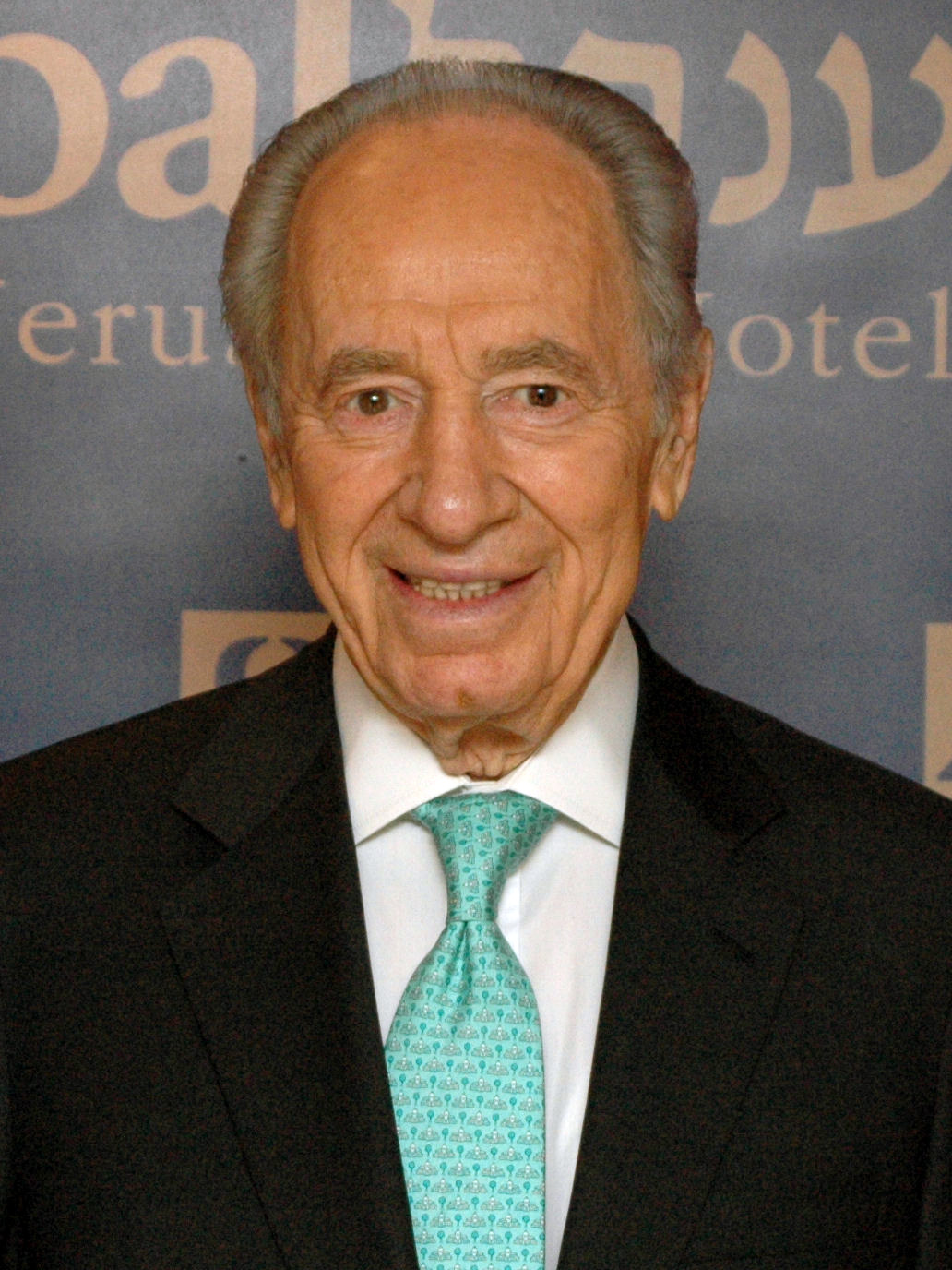
Israeli President Shimon Peres: "It is unconscionable that a Jew would harm something that is holy to another religion ... We will not allow extremists and criminals to undercut the need to live together equally in equality and mutual respect." October, 2011

The "price tag" policy has also been denounced by the Israeli Prime Minister Benjamin Netanyahu and many people across the political spectrum in Israel. Former Knesset member and settler leader Hanan Porat has also condemned the price tag policy. "The 'price tag' response is immoral," Porat said. "It's unheard of that one needs to burn the vineyards and fields of Arabs. It's immoral ... and it gives legitimacy to those who are interested in undermining the outpost issue. It's a very grave matter."

The Chief Ashkenazi Rabbi of Israel, Yona Metzger, visited a mosque in Yasuf 2009 to express his revulsion at the idea of price tag attacks and to deliver a Quran to the local imam. He was escorted by Israeli security forces and Palestinian police, and although the imam had welcomed him, he and his escorts were pelted by rocks upon leaving the village.

The burning of a mosque at the Bedouin town Tuba-Zangariyye on 3 October 2011 shocked Israelis, as many Bedouins, including those from this village, serve in the Israeli army. The Israeli President Shimon Peres, accompanied by Israel's two chief rabbis, visited the mosque, and after surveying the damage stated he was "full of shame". Peres also stated that the mosque burning is "an un-Jewish act". In denouncing the attack he added: "It is unconscionable that a Jew would harm something that is holy to another religion ... We will not allow extremists and criminals to undercut the need to live together equally in equality and mutual respect."

During the visit, the chief Sephardic rabbi of Israel, Shlomo Amar, and chief Ashkenazi Rabbi Yona Metzger, jointly condemned the act and conveyed a message of reconciliation to the village residents. Amar said that he saw it as his duty to set a personal example for the respect one must show to places holy to different religions. He stresses that in the absence of proof, the act may have not been committed by Jews, and the attempt to ascribe the act to price tag activists may be in fact a blood libel. He also added that if the arsonist was in fact Jewish – he was subject to some of the Jewish laws of Dinei Rodef. Dan Margalit writing for the pro-government newspaper Israel Hayom in January 2014 asked "why the voice of the leaders of the settlement movement and its leading rabbis has fallen silent".

=== Reactions of the Israeli public ===
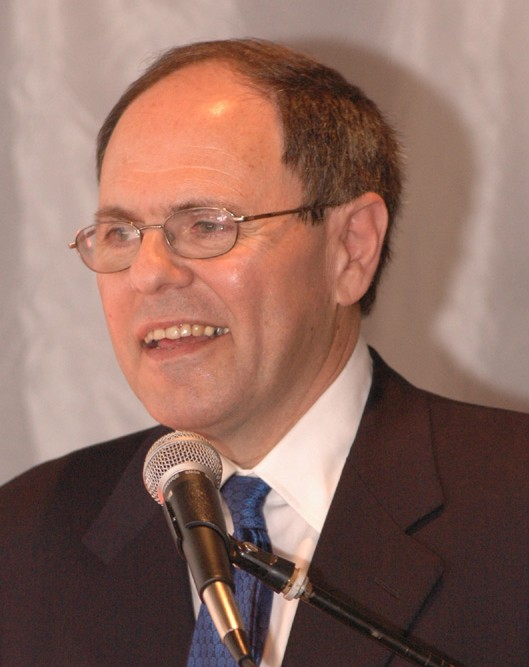
Danny Dayan, Chairman of the Yesha Council: "price tag policy is a moral and tactical disaster ... It is in opposition to Jewish moral values and it damages the settlement enterprise. But I would expect that as we condemn the price tag policy we would expect Netanyahu to condemn the excessive use of force and of arms at Gilad Farm."

Amos Oz has branded perpetrators of price-tag hate crimes 'Hebrew Neo-Nazis'.

The settler leadership have "fiercely condemned" the "price tag" attacks, against either Palestinians or Israeli security forces A Haaretz editorial expressed scepticism over Yesha declarations, asserting that the response of condemnation to an earlier episode was marked by 'feigned and hypocritical shock'. Some settler leaders who have publicly expressed their opposition to some price tag incidents include Danny Dayan, Chairman of the Yesha Council, and Pinhas Wallerstein, former secretary general of the Yesha Council.

Elyakim Haetzni, an Israeli lawyer, pro-settlement activist and former right wing politician, wrote that price tag is "an infuriating term in terms of both morality and logic", and called it a "despicable method".

Former mayor of Kedumim Daniella Weiss, whom senior political and military figures reportedly believed was behind much of the settler violence classified as price tag actions after the evacuation of Beit HaShalom, is on record as rejecting the policy, saying that it had diverted settlers from what she considered to be their most important task – setting up additional caravans and tents to lay claim to ever more hilltops in the West Bank. She stated that the only "price tag" action acceptable to her is the establishment of a new outpost in response to every outpost that had been demolished by Israeli authorities.

According to a Ynet-Gesher survey conducted in March 2011, it was found that 46% of Israelis believe that "price tag" attacks are justified to a certain extent. A breakdown of attitudes among religious nationalist and ultra-orthodox respondents revealed that a large majority are supportive of such price-tag attacks, with 70% of Orthodox and 71% religious nationalists Jews surveyed justifying the policy. Ori Nir of Peace Now evaluated the poll as indicating significant support for violent actions among the Israeli public, yet estimated that it is likely that the timing of the poll influenced the respondents' views. Israelis were still under the influence of the Fogel family massacre, when five Jewish family members, including young children, were massacred in their beds on Sabbath. A later survey, conducted in November 2011 by Tel Aviv University, found that 88% of Jewish Israelis said they were opposed to the "price tag" attacks, with 38% believing the government's response to the attacks to be "too mild" and another 38% finding the response appropriate. The remaining 13% called the state response "too harsh". In some cases, Israeli settlers have claimed that Palestinians and left-wing activists staged "price tag" attacks as a means of provocation, in an attempt to tarnish the image of Jewish settlers in the West Bank.

In a 2011 analysis, Zeev Sternhell argues that while the vast majority in Israel is disgusted by these attacks, and the right is distancing itself from those torching mosques, there is little evidence that they condemn the daily harassment of Palestinians by settlers. The "price tag hooligans" are, he maintains, "the vanguard of the entire settlement movement settler" and "are increasingly reminiscent of phenomena in Europe in the interwar period."

=== Reactions among Israeli rabbis ===
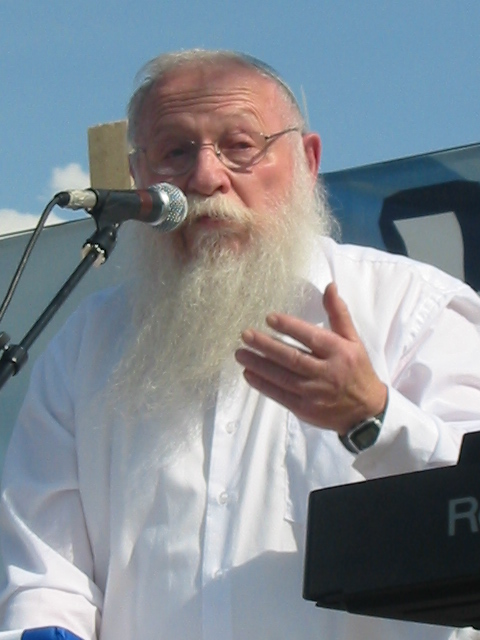
Rabbi Haim Drukman: "'Price Tag' are horrible, shocking, anti-Jewish and anti-morality"

According to Haaretz, Shin Bet officials believe that the vast majority of settlers reject price tag attacks both on moral grounds, prohibiting harm to innocent people and due to the Halachic prohibition which such actions, and on practical grounds, due to the fear that such acts are actually harmful to the settlement movement in the West Bank.

Rabbis who have publicly expressed their opposition include Yuval Cherlow, Haim Druckman, Nahum Rabinovich, Shlomo Aviner, Aharon Lichtenstein, Yaakov Medan, Eliakim Levanon, Avichai Rontzki, Menachem Froman, Ron Kronish, Benny Lau, Samuel Reiner and Haim Navon.

According to the Israeli journalist Nadav Shragai, there is no Israeli leader or rabbi who openly supports this policy, yet some of the young activists who carry out these acts are students of the rabbis Yitzchak Ginsburgh, David Dudkavich and Yitzhak Shapira, who head the "Od Yosef Chai" Yeshiva in the Israeli settlement of Yitzhar. In an interview on Galei Tzahal in February 2010, Ginsburgh explicitly called to refrain from violence against Palestinians. Shapira, while urging a "fierce defense" of outposts, holds the IDF responsible for the atmosphere in which such acts are undertaken, and for implementing a price tag policy against the yeshiva. Shapira, who has called for retaliatory attacks against Palestinians, was arrested in January 2010 for his alleged involvement in the torching of a Palestinian mosque. He denied any involvement, and was released due to lack of evidence.

After an arson attack on a West Bank mosque in 2010, six prominent rabbis from the nearby settlement of Gush Etzion visited the mosque to deliver new copies of the Koran that had been burned.

In July 2011, police announced that they would question prominent rabbis Dov Lior and Ya'akov Yosef over whether their endorsements of Yitzhak Shapira and Yosef Elitzur's book, Torat Hamelech (The King's Torah) which argues that killing non-Jews is acceptable as part of a religious war, constituted an incitement. Security officials said that the book could be used by settlers to justify price tag retributive attacks on Palestinians.

According to ynet news, in 2011, the Israeli Education Ministry decided to shut down the Dorshei Yehudcha Yeshiva high school and withhold funds from the Od Yosef Chai yeshiva due to the involvement of students in violence against Palestinians and security forces. The two yeshivas based in Yitzhar were headed by Rabbi Yitzchak Ginsburgh. Education Ministry Director-General Dr. Shimshon Shoshani harshly criticized the establishments writing that "The students are involved in many violent acts against Palestinian residents and security forces, including during yeshiva study hours. Prominent rabbis in the yeshiva support and/or are involved in this violent activity and go as far as to incite the students to this sort of activity." Knesset member Michael Ben-Ari (National Union) said that the shut down of the yeshiva constituted "capitulation to leftist terror".

The rabbi of Har Brakha, Eliezer Melamed, who according to Chaim Levinson of Haaretz, is considered one of the more extreme settler rabbis, used his weekly column in the newspaper Basheva to denounce the price tag policy. He wrote, "We don't aspire to private vengeance, but to state vengeance led by the Israel Defense Forces and all the systems of government".

According to rabbi Barry Leff of the Israeli NGO Rabbis for Human Rights, the price tag policy is forbidden by halacha (Jewish religious law). Citing the Book of Deuteronomy 24:16, he writes that the Torah clearly forbids vicarious punishment, punishing someone other than the offender. Furthermore, according to Leff, when the perpetrators attack a mosque, a house of God, they are also guilty of violating the principle of bal tashchit, not to carry out wanton destruction, as well as the sin of Chillul Hashem, the desecration of God's name.

== Reactions ==
=== Palestinian ===
A Palestinian Authority spokesman, Ghassan Khatib, has stated that Israeli settler attacks on Palestinian agricultural land are "not random events", and that they are "condoned and supported by the Israeli government" who provide settlers with "full impunity and army protection while they destroy Palestinian land".

An Abu Ghosh resident, Jawdat Ibrahim, writing an op-ed for Ynet in response to the slashing of the tires of 22 cars in his own town in June 2013, wrote that it was bizarre that the state of Israel managed to catch the enemies of the State in operations abroad, yet could not arrest the "bunch of local punks" who terrorize Arabs with their vandalism. Such acts are, in his view, the "direct result" of racist remarks by Israeli politicians, humiliation of Arabs by the police and officials in government offices, and the general atmosphere these attitudes create. His town's response, he affirmed would be different: "Here in Abu Ghosh, we implement a 'price tag' policy of a different kind: Wherever the hooligans destroy, we will build; whatever filth they leave behind, we will clean up. We will not let them destroy the co-existence we have worked so hard to maintain for so many years."

=== Christian ===
In 2014, after the Notre Dame of Jerusalem Center, the local headquarters of the Roman Catholic church, was defaced with words in Hebrew saying "Death to Arabs and Christians and to everyone who hates Israel," and a senior Catholic official received a letter threatening to kill him and other Catholic clergy in Israel, Fouad Twal, the Vatican's most senior cleric in Israel, said, "The unrestrained acts of vandalism poison the atmosphere, the atmosphere of coexistence and the atmosphere of collaboration, calling the price tag attacks acts of "terror". He said Israeli authorities were making an insufficient effort to bring the perpetrators to justice.

"This wave of extremist actions of terror is surely of grave concern to all reasonable persons," Twal said. "The government of Israel must be concerned, because it is very bad for the State of Israel's image abroad. It is also a blight on the democracy that Israel ascribes to itself."

=== International ===
- US
  - On 9 September 2011, the U.S. government condemned the recent "price tag" attacks in the West Bank and demanded that the culprits be arrested.
  - In November 2011, the United Nations Office for the Coordination of Humanitarian Affairs (OCHA) in the Palestinian territories published a report on settler violence against Palestinians in the West Bank that showed significant rises since 2010, and 2009. The report covered not only physical harm to Palestinians, but also property damage such as the impact of uprooted olive trees, damaged tractors or murdered sheep. These incidents include attacks on Palestinians and their property as a means of discouraging the Israeli authorities from dismantling "small satellite settlements built without official authorization, many on privately-owned Palestinian land", which the report refers to as "the so-called 'price tag' strategy". The report states that 90% of complaints filed with the Israeli police by Palestinians of settler violence have been closed without any indictments.
  - In August 2012, the United States defined the attacks as "terrorist incidents".

== See also ==
- Hilltop Youth
- Israeli settler violence
- Racism in Israel
