= Central Fund of Israel =

Non-profit organization

- Type: 501(c) organization
- Tax ID no.: 13-2992985
- Location: United States
- Website: www.centralfundofisrael.org

The Central Fund of Israel is an American non-profit association which funds projects in Israel, including pro-settler groups. It is run out of the Marcus Brothers Textiles store on Sixth Avenue in Manhattan. Its director is Jay Marcus. Itamar Marcus is a former vice president of the fund.

== Fund recipients ==
According to its director, the CFI donated in 2009 approximately $13 million to programs that included social-humanitarian, medical, education, religious, security and community projects.

The fund also supports Women in Green and Honenu, a legal aid group which supports right-wing activists. There are financial links between the fund and Im Tirtzu, for whom it is the main channel for donations.

In May 2021, The Intercept reported, "Since 2011, the CFI has given the Israel Land Fund over $720,000 for its settlement activities, according to documents filed to Israeli regulators and reviewed by The Intercept. In 2017, the Central Fund of Israel’s donation constituted 99.2 percent of the Israel Land Fund’s total budget."

The organization was among a number of US groups reported by The New York Times as using tax exempt status to help fund the Israeli settlement project in the occupied territories. The New York Times described the fund as a "prominent clearing house" used by dozens of West Bank organisations as "a vehicle for channeling donations back to themselves" in order for donors to receive US tax breaks.

The Central Fund of Israel funds right-wing Zionist organisations operating in the occupied territories. Funds were reportedly directed to the Od Yosef Chai yeshiva. The yeshiva, located in the West Bank had come under scrutiny after Yitzhak Shapira, a rabbi at the yeshiva, said it is permissible to kill Palestinian babies because of "the future danger that will arise if they are allowed to grow into evil people like their parents."

The Israel Land Fund, a benefactor of the Central Fund of Israel, "assisted in the eviction of a Palestinian family in Sheikh Jarrah in 2017".

== Opposition ==
The American-Arab Anti-Discrimination Committee has filed a number of complaints with the US Treasury Department and Internal Revenue Service over organizations, such as the Central Fund of Israel, that fund settlement development in the West Bank.
