= Israel Land Fund =

The Israel Land Fund is an Israeli right-wing organization that seeks to encourage Jewish settlement in the West Bank and East Jerusalem. It was founded by Aryeh King in 2007. In 2017 almost all of its funding came from the American Central Fund of Israel.

In 2009 the group announced that it was seeking to buy historically Jewish-owned land in Jordan.

In 2017 a Palestinian family was evicted from a house in Sheikh Jarrah that the fund had purchased, after a lengthy court battle. This was the first such eviction in the neighborhood since 2009.
