= Ami Popper =

Israeli mass murderer (born 1969)

- עמי פופר
- Born: 1969 (age 56–57); Israel
- Occupation: IDF soldier (discharged)
- Status: Incarcerated
- Conviction: Murder (7 counts)
- Penalty: Life imprisonment; commuted to 40 years imprisonment

Details
- Date: 20 May, 1990
- Location: Rishon Lizon
- Target: Palestinian Arab workers
- Killed: 7
- Injured: 10-11
- Weapon: IMI Galil rifle
- Date apprehended: 20 May, 1990

Ami Popper (Hebrew: עמי פופר; born 2 June 1969 in Rishon Lezion) is an Israeli mass murderer and Jewish terrorist who committed the Oyoun Qara massacre on 20 May 1990, killing seven Palestinians at a bus stop in Rishon Lezion, Israel. Popper was arrested and charged with seven counts of murder for which he was sentenced to life imprisonment, later commuted to 40 years.

== Background ==
Ami Popper was born in 1969 in Rishon Lezion, Israel, and had served in the Israel Defense Force (IDF) until he was dishonorably discharged. Reportedly, Popper was punished for inappropriate use of weapons during his military service, where he had attempted to commit suicide, for which he was imprisoned.

== Murders ==
On May 20, 1990, Popper stole IDF uniform trousers, an IMI Galil, and five box magazines full of ammunition from his brother, an active-duty soldier. At around 6:15 a.m., Popper spotted a group of Palestinian Arab workers from the Gaza Strip at a bus stop in Rishon Lezion, who were waiting to be picked up from their laboring jobs in Israel. Suspecting they were Arab, he demanded to see their identity cards, and after confirming they were Arabs, he ordered them to line up in three rows, on their knees. A group of passengers in a passing car with Gaza plates were also stopped and forced to kneel with them. Popper then opened fire with the Galil rifle, killing 7 Palestinians immediately and a further 10/11 were wounded badly, before leaving the scene in his car. Palestinian reports allege that, on arriving at the scene, Israeli police proceeded to beat up the surviving victims. Popper was arrested within an hour.

=== Fatalities ===
- Abed al-Rahim Muhammad Salem Breika (23 years) from Khan Yunis.
- Ziad Moussa Muhammad Sweid (22 years) from Rafah;
- Zayid Zeidan Abd al-Hamid al-Umour (23 years) from Khan Yunis.
- Suleiman Abd al-Razeq Abu Anzeh (22 years) from Khan Yunis.
- Omar Hamdan Ahmad Dehliz (27 years) from Rafah;
- Zaki Muhammad Muhammadan Qudeih (35 years) from Khan Yunis;
- Youssef Mansour Ibrahim Abu Duqqa (36 years) from Khan Yunis.

Palestinians throughout the territories protested, resulting in clashes between protesters and Israeli security forces. While suppressing the protests, a further seven people were killed, including a 14-year-old boy. After a week of clashes, 19 Palestinians were killed, while around 700 more suffered injuries. Prime Minister Yitzhak Shamir dismissed the murders as an act of no political significance since Popper was "deranged", however the court found Popper sane and fit to stand trial. Popper first told police that his attacks were a reaction to the First Intifada, later claiming to have been distraught because his girlfriend had decided to leave him. He also stated that he had been raped by an Arab when he was 13 years old and had committed these killings out of shame and a desire for revenge. Two days later rabbi Meir Kahane held a celebration of his deed in Rishon LeZion.

== Conviction and aftermath ==
Popper was charged and convicted of seven acts of murder in March 1991, and he was sentenced to seven terms of life imprisonment. While in prison Popper became devoutly religious, and in June 1993 he married a Canadian-Jewish woman from a family of Kach activists. Popper and his wife were granted conjugal visits, and they had three children. In 1999, his sentence was reduced to 40 years imprisonment by a presidential amnesty. Popper was initially imprisoned in Maasiyahu Prison, and was placed in the Torani cellblock, a special cellblock for religious inmates. Prisoners there pray three times a day and spend most of the day studying the Torah and other sacred texts. At one point, his cellmate was former minister Shlomo Benizri. After Benizri's release, Popper's influence in the Torani bloc grew, and he began harassing former President Moshe Katsav, serving a seven-year sentence for rape and other sexual offenses, as Katsav had refused Popper's request for a pardon while he was president. According to the Israel Prison Service, Popper had verbally abused Katsav and sent other inmates to harass him. In October 2012, Popper was transferred to the maximum-security Ayalon Prison. Right wing and Orthodox politicians in Israel have demanded his release along with other Israeli prisoners who were convicted of murder or other violence committed against Palestinians, in exchange for the release of Palestinian prisoners who committed murder or violence against Israelis.

On 17 January 2007, while on a 48-hour furlough from prison, Popper was involved in a car accident he caused by crossing a solid line, hitting oncoming traffic. His wife and one of his sons were killed in the accident. Popper himself was moderately injured. Police reported that Popper's driver's license had expired in 1999, and that he was driving illegally without a license. Initial reports indicate Popper's children were not wearing seatbelts in the backseat.

Popper later remarried and then divorced. In May 2013, he married his third wife, a woman known only as "M" who had previously made headlines by allegedly allowing her children to be abused. The couple was married in a small ceremony in Jerusalem, after Popper was granted a prison furlough. Popper's family has been the recipient of financial support from the Israeli NGO Honenu, and indirectly from tax deductible U.S. donations, according to journalist Uri Blau.

== See also ==
- First Intifada
- Jewish terrorism
- Zionist political violence
