= Honenu =

Israeli right wing legal aid nonprofit

Honenu (Hebrew: חוננו) is an Israeli right-wing legal aid nonprofit. The organization has provided legal support to Israelis charged with violence against Palestinians, as well as financial support to the families of right-wing Israeli prisoners. Honenu describes itself as "a non-profit legal aid organization providing legal assistance to soldiers and citizens, who at times due to the security situation are persecuted by certain government authorities and a court system heavily influenced and pressured by anti-Israel 'human rights' groups." It was founded in 2001 by Shmuel Meidad, a resident of Kiryat Arba. In 2019 it had 10 employees.

== Name ==
Honenu's name derives from Psalm 123: “Favor us [Honenu], Hashem, favor us, for we are fully sated with contempt.”

== Activities ==
Most of Honenu's budget goes towards legal aid. Honenu's national profile increased during the 2005 Israeli disengagement from the Gaza Strip, when the organization provided legal representation to many protestors. The bulk of its clients since then have been young Israeli settlers (hilltop youth) detained after confrontations with Palestinians or the Israeli security services. Honenu has also represented Israeli soldiers and Border Police officers under investigation for incidents that occurred on duty. The organization also provides legal counsel to prisoners and financial aid to their families--this has included the families of Yigal Amir and Ami Popper. It has also provided legal counsel to the families of people killed in terrorist attacks.

== Funding ==
In 2019 Ynet reported that Honenu's annual donations exceeded 4 million shekels. In its early years, about half of its funding came from the United States. In 2010 it began receiving funding from the Central Fund of Israel, which gave Honenu 1.135 million shekels in 2015.
