= Eliezer (Eduardo) Zeiger =

Biologist

Eliezer (Eduardo) Zeiger is a professor of biology. He has taught at the University of California, Los Angeles. In 1970, he received his doctorate degree in genetics from the University of California, Davis.

Zeiger has published almost 100 scientific papers on the subjects of photothynsesis and the sensory transduction of internal and external signals in plant cells. He is co-author of the "Plant Physiology and Development" textbook published by Oxford University Press, which is a widely used upper-division plant physiology textbook that has been translated into numerous languages and published in six editions.

Zeiger's research includes stomatal function and the transfer of genetic material in response to blue-light. In 1987 he compiled a book on stomatal function, published by Stanford University Press. He has also researched the types of acclimatizations of stomata that are reflected by larger yields in commercial agriculture.

== Biography ==
Zeiger grew up in Northern Argentina. He is a professor emeritus at the University of California, Los Angeles He is founder and executive director of the Torah Science Foundation, which was founded for the purpose of integrating Torah wisdom and the wisdom of secular sciences.

Since 1992, Zeiger has been a student of Rabbi Yitzchak Ginsburgh, a leading authority on Jewish mysticism. Together, Ginsburgh and Zeiger have co-authored part of a series of integrative Torah biology textbooks for Jewish high schools on nutrition and the nervous system.

== Selected publications ==
- Plant Physiology and Development Taiz, L.; Zeiger, E.; Møller, I; Murphy, A. (2014) Oxford University Press. 6th edition.
