= Daniel Shalit =

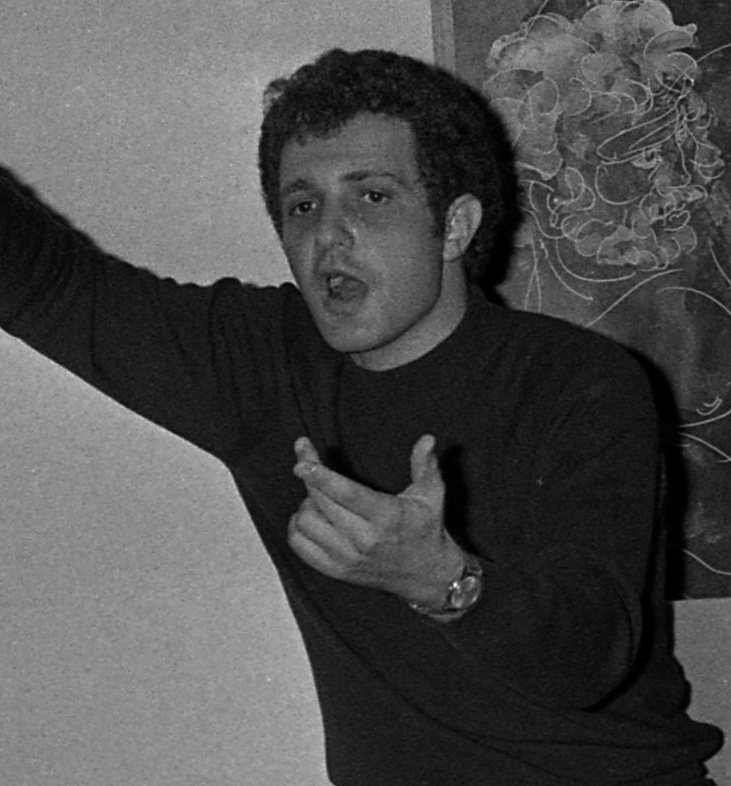
Daniel Shalit, 1969

Daniel Shalit (Hebrew: דניאל שליט; born 1940) is an Israeli conductor, composer, and doctor of musicology and philosophy.

Shalit studied at Tel-Aviv University. In the past, he served as conductor of the Israel Chamber Orchestra. He has written many books and articles about Jewish philosophy and culture. He is a lecturer at the Jewish Statesmanship Center.
