= Dov Lior =

Israeli Orthodox rabbi (born 1933)

Rabbi Dov Lior
- דוב ליאור
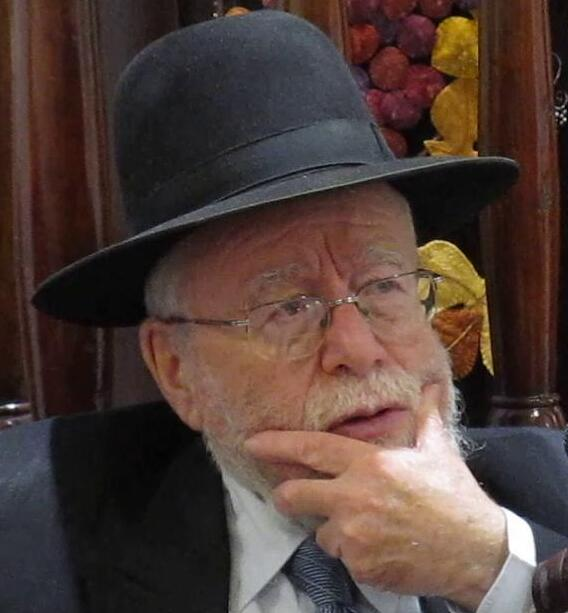
- Lior at Beit HaRav, Jerusalem in 2013

Chief Rabbi of Hebron, Kiryat Arba, and Moshav Kfar Haroeh

Rosh Yeshiva of Kiryat Arba Hesder Yeshiva

Head of the Council of Rabbis of Judea and Samaria

Personal details
- Born: Dov Leinwand; 30 October 1933 (age 92) Jarosław, Galicia, Poland
- Spouse(s): Bitya Goldberger (m. 1960–1988; her death), Esther Shahor
- Children: 11
- Education: Mercaz HaRav
- Occupation: Rabbi, political figure

Dov Lior (Hebrew: דוב ליאור; born 30 October 1933) is an Israeli Orthodox rabbi and political figure part of a far-right, nationalist movement for an ethnic and religious state. He served as the Chief Rabbi of Kiryat Arba, a Jewish settlement near the West Bank town of Hebron, until late 2014.

He is the dean (or rosh yeshiva) of the Kiryat Arba IDF-Hesder Yeshiva and leads the council of rabbis for the West Bank settlements. Lior founded the hard-right Tekumah party together with Arutz 7's owner Rabbi Zalman Melamed and Rabbi Chaim Steiner.

Lior is a longtime symbol of religious and nationalist extremism in Israel. Lior has also expressed support for mass murderers, such as Israeli-American mass murderer Baruch Goldstein, who killed 29 Muslims in a Hebron mosque. He claimed the 2015 Islamic State attacks on Paris, which left 130 civilians dead, were deserved as payback for the Holocaust. When Israel invaded the Gaza Strip in 2014, he issued a religious ruling that allowed soldiers to kill civilians if that's what's needed for the safety of Israel and, if necessary, destroy Gaza entirely.

== Biography ==
Dov Leinwand (later Lior) was born to a Belz Hasidic family, son to Moshe Leinwand, in Jarosław, western Galicia, Poland. During World War II, he fled the Nazis with his family to the Soviet Union. They went deep into Soviet territory, including Siberia and Kazakhstan, and suffered from hunger and disease. Both of his parents died. In 1944, he was placed in an orphanage for Polish citizens. In 1945, he arrived in Poland. Using a false identity, he managed to pass into the American occupation zone in Germany, where Jewish institutions operated. There, he reunited with an older brother who had served in the Red Army during the war, while another brother who was with him during the war joined the Hashomer Hatzair movement. Lior was placed in a Jewish children's home, where he began to study Hebrew.

In 1947, Lior was one of the passengers on the SS Exodus, which was intercepted by the Royal Navy after defying the British blockade of Palestine. He and the other refugees were deported by the British back to Germany. He eventually managed to reach Mandatory Palestine aboard the ship Negba, which arrived a few weeks before the establishment of the State of Israel. Once there, he changed his surname to the Hebrew Lior. In Israel, he first studied at the Bnei Akiva Kfar HaRoeh yeshiva, and then at Zvi Yehuda Kook's Mercaz haRav yeshiva, where, owing to Lior's being an orphan, Kook treated him like a son. He served in the Israel Defense Forces for one month in 1964.

Lior married Bitya Goldberger in 1960. She died of cancer in 1988. He later married Esther, widow of Ephraim Shahor. Lior has 11 children, 55 grandchildren, and two great-grandchildren. His two brothers arrived in Israel after him, and joined the Hashomer Hatzair kibbutz HaMa'apil.

== Rabbinic career ==
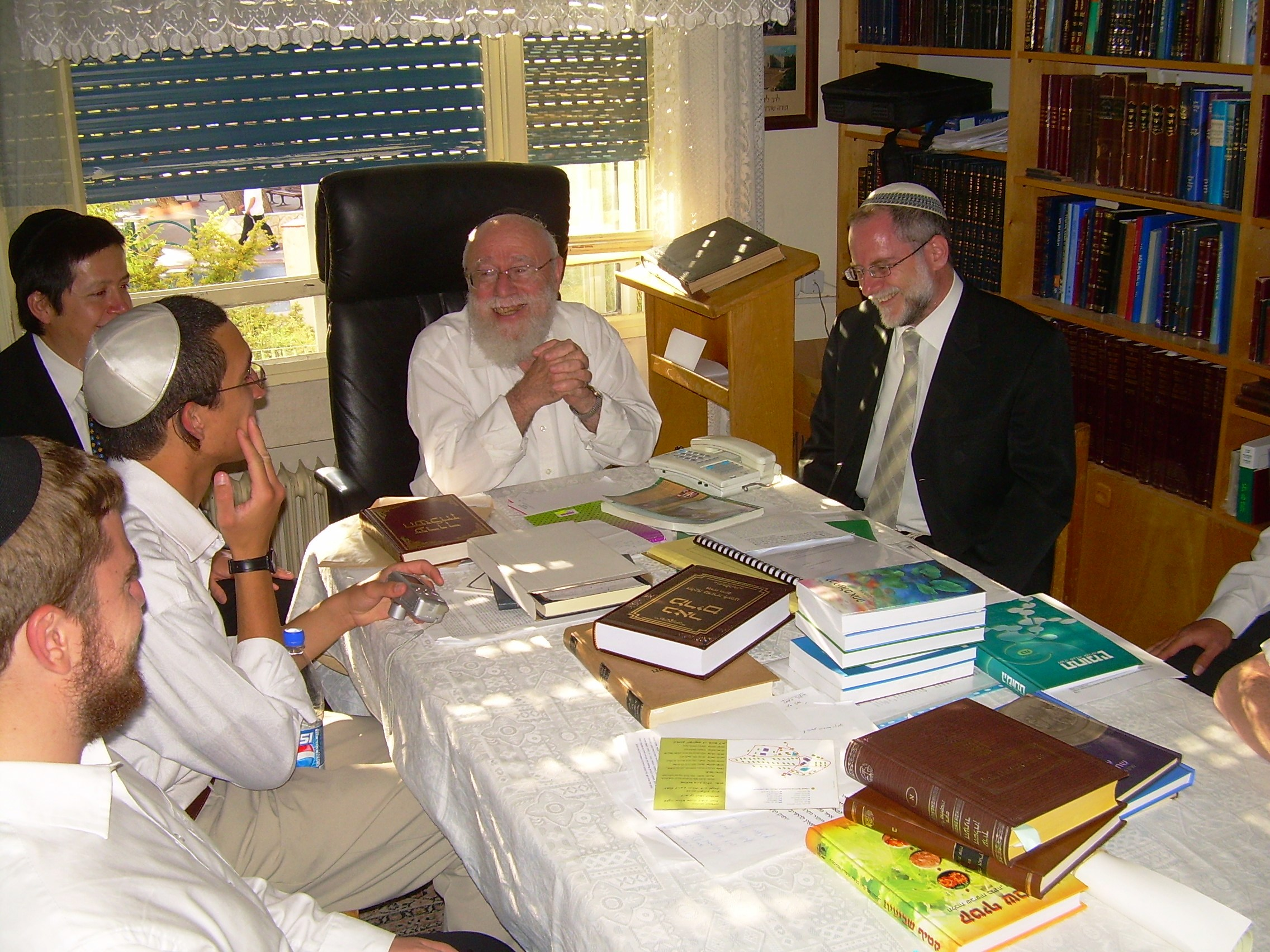
Lior (center) in a meeting with students of Machon Meir at his house in Kiryat Arba in June 2008

Lior is a Religious Zionist leader. He served as Rabbi of Moshav Kfar Haroeh for 10 years. He subsequently became Chief Rabbi of Kiryat Arba. He serves along with Eliezer Waldman as head of the Hesder Yeshiva Nir Kiryat Arba. In 1978, he ran for the post of Chief Rabbi of Jerusalem, but was defeated 37-25 by Bezalel Zolty. He served as Av Beit Din of the Beersheva Rabbinical Court. One of his rulings, that Jews should be prepared to sacrifice their lives to defend the settlement of Hebron, has been interpreted as support for acts of suicide if the government tries to force evacuation. In the late 1980s, Israel's Attorney General barred Lior's almost certain election to the Supreme Rabbinical Council of Israel following a public outcry over his remark that captured Arab terrorists could be used to conduct medical experiments. After the Mercaz HaRav massacre, he said it was forbidden by halakha (Jewish law) to employ or rent homes to Arabs.

In 2008 Lior and other right-wing rabbis declared the government's policies on Israeli settlements to be "worse than the British Mandate's White Paper". Evaluating the Israeli invasion of Lebanon, Lior said it proved Israel was the one Middle Eastern state with sufficient military force to be considered a real power, a state all nations, bar none, must reckon with, and that "rooting out the iniquity" (of the terrorists) was "but a preliminary to the eventual rooting out of all evil in the world". According to Professor Uriel Simon, Lior is also reported to have said at a rally that, "(i)n order to prevent the death of one (Israeli) soldier, I am willing to destroy all of Beirut".

Lior denounced the possible transfer of jurisdiction of Christian sites in Israel to the Holy See in 2009, saying it was "unthinkable to hand over to the Vatican any piece of our Holy Land". In 2011 he suggested that the Israeli government should offer incentives to the Bedouin to return to what he considered as their places of origin, Saudi Arabia and Libya.

In late 2014, Lior stepped down as chief rabbi. In February 2015, he moved from Kiryat Arba to the Mount of Olives in Jerusalem.

== Controversies ==
Lior has stated that the killing of non-Jews during wartime is sanctioned by halakha. He asserted that Jewish women should not use sperm donated by a non-Jewish man, and that a baby born through such an insemination will have the "negative genetic traits that characterize non-Jews", and that, "If the father is not Jewish, what character traits could he have? Traits of cruelty, of barbarism."

In 2007, commenting on the situation of African refugees in Israel, Lior said that a much more important issue was the situation of Jewish settlers - whom he termed "refugees" - expelled from Gaza in 2005.

In 2008 Foreign Policy magazine included him on a list of "The World’s Worst Religious Leaders" known for "preaching messages of hatred and violence".

Leading rabbis have testified that Lior was the source of rulings labeling the late Prime Minister Yitzhak Rabin a rodef and a moser (traitor who endangers Jewish lives). Rabin's assassin, Yigal Amir, is known to have visited Lior. Baruch Goldstein also met with Lior. After Goldstein murdered 29 Palestinian worshipers at the Cave of the Patriarchs, Lior declared him "as holy as the martyrs of the Holocaust". Lior gave a eulogy at the funeral of Baruch Goldstein.

In June 2011, Lior was arrested by Israeli police and questioned on suspicion of inciting violence for endorsing a religious book, the King's Torah, that gives Jews permission to kill innocent non-Jews, including children. Lior had been summoned for questioning by authorities, but refused to appear. Spontaneous demonstrations erupted in and around Jerusalem as outraged supporters assembled in various parts of the city and on Route 1 to protest Lior's arrest. Israeli chief rabbis Yona Metzger and Shlomo Amar condemned the arrest as a "grave offense to an important rabbi's honor", and 25 members of the Knesset signed a petition denouncing it as "shameful" and as having been orchestrated by Deputy State Prosecutor Shai Nitzan. Lior was released after an hour of questioning.

Both opposition leader Tzipi Livni and Prime Minister Benjamin Netanyahu called for a full judicial investigation of Lior's remarks, and said that rabbis were not above the law.

In September 2011, Lior stated that Arabs are "evil camel riders".

In 2012, Lior referred to US President Barack Obama with what was possibly a racial slur, "kushi of the West"—which is akin to the modern pejorative use of the word negro in certain contexts—and likened him to the genocidal enemy of the Jews, Haman. He also compared Western European leaders to Nazi collaborators.

In July 2014, he said it was acceptable to kill Palestinian civilians and destroy the entire Gaza Strip in order to protect Jewish people in the South.

In November 2015, during a eulogy at a funeral in Jerusalem for a father and son killed in West Bank, Lior said of the Paris attacks: "The wicked ones in blood-soaked Europe deserve it for what they did to our people 70 years ago."

In July 2024, Lior with several rabbis of the right-wing religious Zionist community came out against a hostage deal.

On 16 October 2026, Lior issued a religious ruling that allowed Israeli settlers to pick olives from Palestinian lands in the West Bank to "claim" ownership, stating that Palestinian landowners were not permitted to access to their orchards during harvest season due to restrictions by Israeli authorities have been "sufficiently compensated" in the years they had access to. Lior also considered the theft of olives by settlers as an "additional virtue" and advocated for expansion of the West Bank.
