= Od Yosef Chai =

Yeshiva in Israel

Coordinates: 32.17161°N 35.23653°E

Od Yosef Chai, also known as Od Yosef Hai (Hebrew: עוד יוסף חי, Joseph still lives) is a yeshiva situated in the West Bank settlement of Yitzhar. Od Yosef Chai includes several related institutions; a yeshiva high school, a yeshiva gedola (post-high school yeshiva), a kollel (yeshiva for married men) and the publishing house that released "The King's Torah", and other materials.

The yeshiva was initially located at Joseph's Tomb in Nablus, but was relocated to the settlement of Yitzhar after the original site was abandoned following the outbreak of the Al-Aqsa Intifada. In April 2014, the IDF seized the yeshiva, which functioned as the headquarters from where violent attacks on both nearby Palestinian villages and Israeli security forces were launched, and Talmudic studies there were suspended.

== Leadership ==
In 2003, the president of the yeshiva Yitzhak Ginzburg was charged with incitement to racism for authoring a book calling Arabs a "cancer". One of the yeshiva heads, Yitzhak Shapira, was investigated by Israeli police for his book, The King's Torah whose main focus is the halachic adjudications of killing non-Jews. The book proved controversial in its declaration that the killing of gentile babies was permissible because of "the future danger that will arise if they are allowed to grow into evil people like their parents." Shapira was arrested for direct involvement in an arson attack on a West Bank mosque. He denied involvement and was later released due to lack of evidence. Shapira was filmed accompanying some of his students to an Arab village where he watched them throwing stones.

== Yeshiva high school closure ==
On 29 May 1989 a group of several dozen students from the original Nablus Yeshiva rampaged through Kifl Haris killing a 16-year-old and injuring two others. A number of them were detained by Israeli police.

In November 2011 the Israeli Education Ministry closed the religious school associated with the yeshiva. The closure was approved by Attorney General Yehuda Weinstein following the recommendation of Shin Bet on the basis of student and staff involvement in violence against Palestinians and Israeli security services. Over a period of years students had been arrested in connection with price tag attacks.

Shimshon Shoshani, the Director General of the Education Ministry, stated that evidence showed the students were perpetrating violent acts against Arabs and Israeli security services with the active support of the Yeshiva Rabbis. He said that the Rabbis were both involved in the violence and the incitement of their students to commit violent acts. Shimshon stated that the violence even occurred during class time and that the school's activities were of minimal educational value. In April 2014, following assaults by Yitzhar residents on an IDF unit sent to supervise the dismantlement of illegal outposts in the settlement, the Israeli government, under the approval of Defence Minister Moshe Ya'alon, cracked down by setting up an army post in Yitzhar, and occupying the yeshiva. Major General Avi Mizrahi said to the press that, "This yeshiva doesn't teach Torah. It teaches evil that needs to be eliminated." Yeshiva authorities denounced the precedent of a government closing a place of Torah study and branded the transformation of the yeshiva building into a military post as desecration of a holy place, according to the Jewish halacha.

== Funding ==
Prior to 2013, the yeshiva received government funding associated with four different line items of the Israeli state budget: As of 2009, it received NIS 468,000 from the Education Ministry for the yeshiva high school and NIS 847,000 for the yeshiva gedola (post-high school yeshiva); NIS 707,000 from the Social Affairs Ministry for a rehabilitation project for ultra-Orthodox drop-outs and plus NIS 156,000 for the running costs of a dormitory.

Philip Weiss reported on the Mondoweiss website that payments to the New York-based Central Fund of Israel were directed to the yeshiva. According to Weiss, the yeshiva received $27,000 from the fund in 2007 and 2008. The report that the yeshiva was subsidized by funds from an office in a New York Textile company was confirmed by investigative reporter Uri Blau in 2015.

As of 2013, the government had ceased funding the yeshiva, asserting that it would be "grossly unreasonable" to continue funding it in light of the yeshiva's encouragement of violent actions against Palestinians and the security services.

== Sanctions ==
In October 2024, the government of the United Kingdom imposed sanctions on the yeshiva for encouraging violence against non-Jews.
