= Yitzhak Shapira =

Israeli rabbi

Yitzhak Shapira (Hebrew: יצחק שפירא) is an Israeli rabbi who lived in Kiryat Moshe neighborhood in Jerusalem, and is head of the Od Yosef Chai Yeshiva.

== The King's Torah ==
In 2009, he published a book (The King's Torah) in which he argues that it is permissible for Jews to kill non-Jews, including children, under certain circumstances. The book suggests that there may be a reason to kill babies on the enemy side, even if they have not violated any laws, due to the potential future danger they might pose based on the assumption that they will grow up to be evil like their parents. The author also proposes that indirect killing of children could be justified as a means of exerting pressure on enemy leaders or if the children are obstructing a rescue operation and their presence contributes to murder. Shapira also argues that children of a king can be harmed to pressure him if he is considered wicked and harming them would prevent him from acting wickedly. He argues that it is preferable to kill one person who is pursuing another with the intent to murder, rather than killing multiple individuals.

The book was distributed by Yeshivat HaRaayon HaYehudi in Jerusalem, which adheres to the ideas of the right-wing Rabbi Meir Kahane.

Yehuda Bauer described the book as a "mortal danger to the Jewish people as a whole". Ophir Pines-Paz, a member of the Israeli Knesset at the time, called on the attorney general to open a criminal investigation against Shapira on account of the book.

== Anti-Palestinian sentiments and incidents ==
Shapira was detained for questioning in 2006 over an article that advocated expelling or killing all male Palestinians above the age of 13 in the West Bank. In 2008 he signed a "manifesto" in support of Israelis suspected of beating two Arab youths during that year's Holocaust Remembrance Day.

In January 2010, he was arrested for his "alleged involvement in the torching of a Palestinian mosque in the village of Yasuf." He denied any involvement, and was released due to lack of evidence.

In October 2010, Shapira urged Israel Defense Forces soldiers to use Palestinian civilians as human shields, claiming that it was against "true Jewish values" for a soldier to endanger his life for the sake of enemy soldiers or civilians.
