= Hardal =

Haredi portion of the religious Zionist Jewish community in Israel

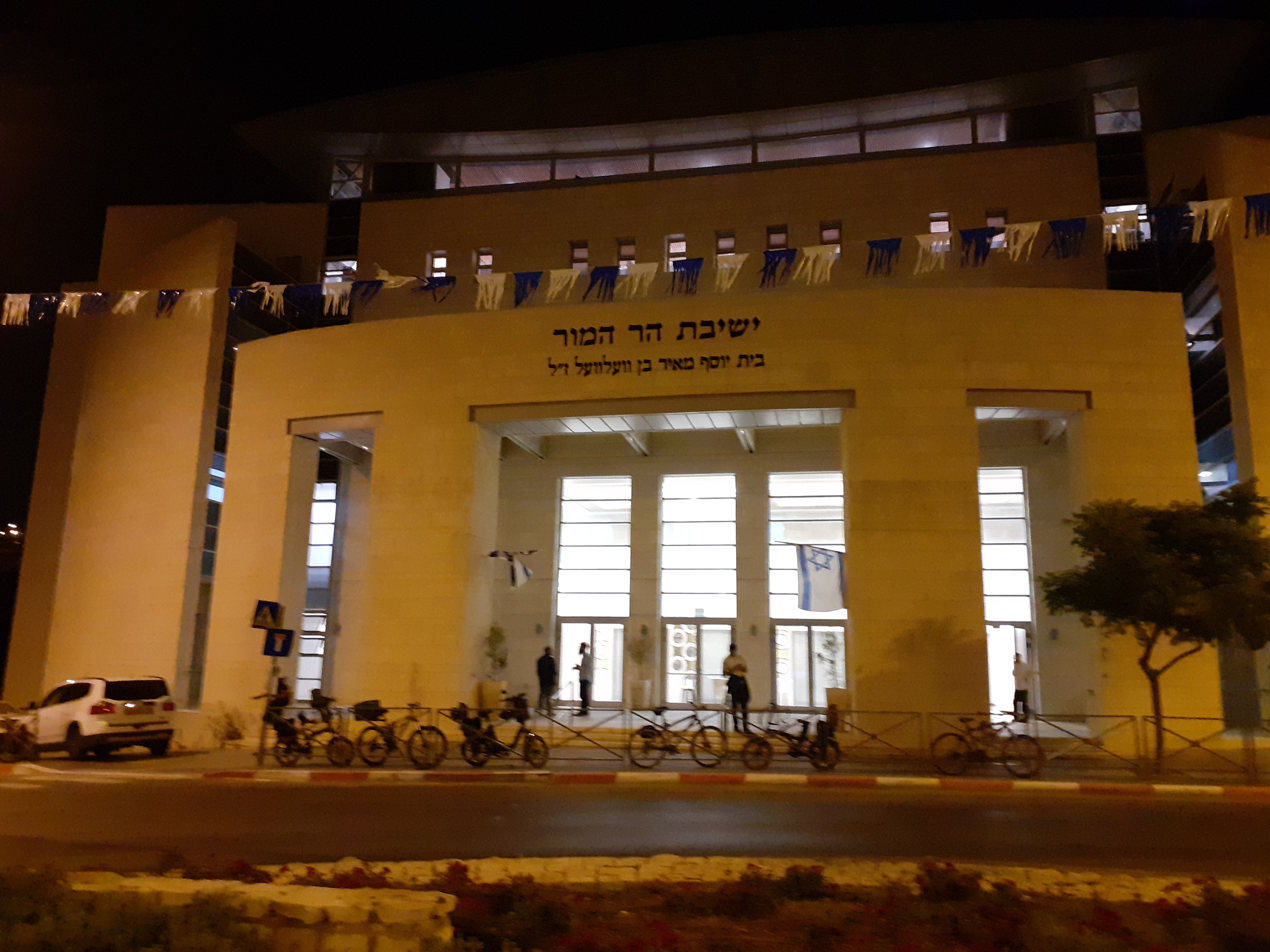
Har Hamor Yeshiva - a renowned institution of the Hardal community

Hardal (also spelled Chardal; Hebrew: חרד״ל, acronym for חרדי לאומי Ḥaredi Le'umi, lit. 'Nationalist Haredi', plural Hardalim) usually refers to the portion of the Religious Zionist Jewish community in Israel which inclines significantly toward Haredi ideology (in terms of outlook on the secular world, or in their stringent khumra approach to Halakha). In their approach to the State of Israel, though, they are Zionist, and they believe that Israel is Atchalta De'Geulah (the beginning of the redemption).

Hardal Jews are also known as Torani (lit., "Torah-oriented"), or Torani-Leumi ("Torah Nationalist").

== Overview ==
On yeshiva.org.il, "Chardal" is described as, "The people who classify themselves as 'Charedi Leumi', or 'Chardal', try to keep the Mitzvot strictly, Kalah Kechamurah [light and weighty matters alike], while being involved in the national life in the state, and in the settling of Eretz Yisrael". It has also been explained as the "Anglo Orthodox religious sector who follow a Charedi lifestyle, yet may also serve in the army in religious units, attend a Hesder yeshiva, and pursue a work career". Yet another explanation is, "those connected to the seriousness of Torah learning and stricter observance of Jewish Law - like the Charedim - but who are Zionist and have a more positive view of the secular world and Israel, like the dati leumi camp".

The term Hardal is sometimes used to refer to those coming from the Haredi world who join Nahal Haredi (the shortened army service for Yeshiva graduates) and continue to live within the broader Hardal world. It is also sometimes used for American yeshivish Jews who moved to Israel and support the state.

== History ==
The term Hardal is part of a broad process of certain groups of Religious Zionist youth becoming more strict in certain religious observances, and more ideologically driven by the thought of Zvi Yehuda Kook (son of Abraham Isaac Kook). In the late 1970s, graduates of Mercaz HaRav yeshiva began to reject certain aspects of the Religious Zionist and Bnei Akiva lifestyle.

According to some sources, the term Hardal was created at a meeting of the youth group EZRA in 1990. (Ezra is the Poalei Agudah youth group associated with Torah im Derech Eretz.) In later years, the term Hardal became a group that actually started separating itself from the broader religious Zionist community in order to dedicate itself to leading a life dedicated to strict Jewish practice, without the influence of outside culture. There was emphasis placed on modesty in dress, and early marriage. Shlomo Aviner was a major ideologue for this group.

In recent years, it refers to those under the influence of Zvi Thau, who left Yeshivat Merkaz HaRav to found the more Hardalic Yeshivat Har Hamor. Thau rejects secular studies and secular influences. He is also against any academic influence on teachers colleges, rejecting the influence of modern educational psychology, and modern approaches to the study of the Bible. Those who follow this approach are called followers of Yeshivat HaKav - "Yeshivot that follow the line".

== Schools ==
There are schools for both boys and girls located in Jerusalem, as well as in Ramat Beit Shemesh (Ahavat Yisrael). Their philosophy is, "To adhere to an open Haredi approach to Halakha and lifestyle, while at the same time leaving the possibility for army service and university studies as a goal".

== Leadership ==
Past leaders (deceased)

- Eliezer Waldman, dean of the Kiryat Arba yeshiva (1937-2021)
- Mordechai Eliyahu, former Chief Rabbi of Israel (1929–2010)
- Avraham Shapira, former Chief Rabbi of Israel, and dean of the Merkaz HaRav yeshiva (1914–2007)
- Zvi Yehuda Kook, former dean of the Mercaz HaRav yeshiva (1891–1982)
- Noah Weinberg, former dean of the Aish HaTorah yeshiva (1930–2009)
- Meir Kahane, former leader of Kach (1932–1990), editor of the Jewish Press
- Binyamin Ze'ev Kahane, son of Meir Kahane and former leader of Kahane Chai (1966–2000)
- Baruch Kahane, son of Meir Kahana and a Nascent Sanhedrin-appointed High Priest.
- Shaul Yisraeli, former rabbi of Kfar Haroeh and dean of the Mercaz HaRav yeshiva (1909–1995)
- Ya'akov Yosef, former dean of the Hazon Ya'akov yeshiva (1946–2013)
- Moshe Levinger, an Israeli advocate of Jewish settlement in Hebron, and cofounder of Israeli settler ultranationalist Gush Emunim (1935–2015).
- Yeshayahu Hadari, former dean of the HaKotel yeshiva (1933–2018).
- Haim Drukman, dean of the Or Etzion yeshiva (1932–2022).

Current leaders:

- Bezalel Smotrich, member of Knesset, the twenty-eighth Finance Minister, leader of the Religious Zionist Party, and co-founder of Regavim
- Rafi Peretz, former Education Minister, and former leader of The Jewish Home (party)
- Eli Yishai, leader of Yachad
- Avi Maoz, Noam MK
- Eli Ben-Dahan, former Deputy Defense Minister and leader of Ahi
- Baruch Marzel, right-hand man of Meir Kahane, and former leader of the Jewish National Front
- Ya'akov Katz, former leader of the National Union
- Michael Ben-Ari, former spokesman for Otzma Yehudit
- Benzi Gopstein, leader of Lehava
- Shalom Dov Wolpo, leader of Eretz Yisrael Shelanu and SOS Israel
- Yehuda Glick, leader of Ha-Liba and former Likud MK
- Hillel Horowitz, former Jewish Home MK
- David Bar-Hayim, head of the Machon Shilo Institute
- Yonatan Yosef, spokesman for Jewish-Israeli settlers in Sheikh Jarrah
- Yaakov Ariel, former rabbi of Ramat Gan and co-founder of Israeli settler movement Gush Emunim.
- Shmuel Eliyahu, rabbi of Safed
- Dov Lior, rabbi of Kiryat Arba
- Nahmane Kahane, member of the Nascent Sanhedrin and brother of Meir Kahana.
- Zephaniah Drori, rabbi of Kiryat Shmona
- Zvi Thau, dean of the Har Hamor yeshiva and spiritual leader of Noam
- Mordechai Elon, former dean of the HaKotel yeshiva
- Meir Mazuz, dean of the Kisse Rahamim yeshiva
- Zalman Melamed, dean of Beit El yeshiva
- Yitzhak Shapira, dean of Od Yosef Chai yeshiva
- Shlomo Aviner, dean of Ateret Yerushalayim yeshiva and cofounder of Gush Emunim.
- Israel Ariel, former rabbi of Yamit, number two candidate of the Kach Party, Cofounder of the Temple Institute and member of the Nascent Sanhedrin.
- Eli Sadan, founder and head of Bnei David Academy
- Daniella Weiss, former mayor of Samarian village Kedumim, cofounder of Gush Emunim.
- Menachem Froman, co-founder of Gush Emunim and an Israeli negotiator.
- Hillel Weiss, of "Professors for a Strong Israel"
- Oury Amos Cherki, senior lecturer at Machon Meir
- Robert Aumann, Nobel Prize winner and professor at the Hebrew University of Jerusalem

== See also ==
- Orthodox Judaism
- Haredim and Zionism
- National Catholicism
- Religious nationalism
- Modern Orthodox Judaism § Ideological spectrum
