= Kach =

Kach כך
- Leader: Meir Kahane
- Founded: 1971
- Banned: 13 March 1994
- Headquarters: Jerusalem
- Paramilitary wing: Jewish Defense League
- Ideology: Kahanism; Religious Zionism; Neo-Zionism; Halachic state; Religious conservatism; Economic liberalism; Population transfer; Anti-communism; Anti-Arabism; Anti-Islam sentiment; Ultranationalism; Greater Israel
- Political position: Far-right
- Religion: Orthodox Judaism (mainly Hardal)
- International affiliation: None
- Colors: Gold
- Most MKs: 1 (1984)

Election symbol
- כך

Party flag

Kach (Hebrew: כך, lit. 'Thus') was a radical Orthodox Jewish, religious Zionist political party in Israel, existing from 1971 to 1994. Founded by Rabbi Meir Kahane in 1971 based on his Jewish-Orthodox-nationalist ideology (subsequently dubbed Kahanism), the party won a single seat in the Knesset in the 1984 elections, after several electoral failures. However, it was barred from participating in the next elections in 1988 under the revised Knesset Elections Law banning parties that incited racism. After Kahane's assassination in 1990 the party split, with Kahane Chai ("Kahane Lives") breaking away from the main Kach faction.

The party was ultimately also barred from standing in the 1992 elections and both organisations were banned outright in 1994 by the Israeli cabinet under 1948 anti-terrorism laws, following statements in support of Baruch Goldstein's massacre of 29 Palestinians at the Cave of the Patriarchs (Goldstein himself was a Kach supporter).

Both groups are designated as terrorist organisations by Israel, Canada, Japan, and formerly the European Union, as well as the United States. They are believed to have an overlapping core membership of fewer than 100 people, with links to the modern party Otzma Yehudit.

== Background ==
=== Early history ===
Kahane immigrated to Israel from the United States in September 1971, at first declaring that he would only involve himself in Jewish education. However, he soon became involved in controversy, initiating protests advocating the expulsion of most Arabs from Israel and the Palestinian territories. In 1972, Jewish Defense League leaflets were distributed around Hebron, calling for the mayor to stand trial for the 1929 Hebron massacre.

In 1971, Kahane founded a new party, which ran in the 1973 elections under the name "The League List". The party won 12,811 votes (0.82%), just 2,857 (0.18%) short of the electoral threshold at the time (1%) for winning a seat. Following the elections, the party's name was changed to Kach, taken from the Irgun motto "Rak Kach" ("Only thus"). The party was less successful in the 1977 elections, in which it won 4,396 votes (0.25%), and in 1980 Kahane was sentenced to six months in prison for his involvement in a plan to commit an "act of provocation" on the Temple Mount. The 1981 elections were another failure, with Kach receiving only 5,128 votes (0.27%).

=== Kahane enters the Knesset ===
Kach poster from the 1984 elections. It reads "This time Kahane: Because he is one of us! Give him the power to finally take care of them! We'll vote Kach."

Events in the next couple of years increased the party's profile. In 1982, Israel returned the Sinai Peninsula to Egypt, as part of the Egypt–Israel peace treaty which involved evacuating Israeli settlers living in the peninsula. There was fierce resistance, particularly in Yamit, the largest settlement, where several extremists had barricaded themselves inside a synagogue and were threatening to commit suicide. Menachem Begin's government asked Kahane to act as an intermediary and convince them to give in.

Prior to the 1984 legislative elections, the party was barred by the Central Elections Committee for racism. It successfully appealed to the Supreme Court, which reversed the CEC's decision, ruling that the Knesset Elections Law (one of the Basic Laws of Israel) did not allow a party to be barred on the grounds of racism, but did suggest that the law be amended. In the elections, the party won 25,907 votes (1.2%), passing the electoral threshold for the first time, and winning one seat, which was duly taken by Kahane.

Kahane's legislative proposals focused on revoking the Israeli citizenship for non-Jews and banning Jewish-Gentile marriages and sexual relations, based on the Code of Jewish Law compiled by Maimonides in the Mishneh Torah.

As his political career progressed, Kahane became increasingly isolated in the Knesset. His speeches, boycotted by Knesset members, were made to an empty parliament, except for the duty chairman and the transcriptionist. Kahane's legislative proposals and motions of no-confidence against the government were ignored or rejected by fellow Knesset members. Kahane often pejoratively called other Knesset members "Hellenists" in Hebrew (a reference from Jewish religious texts describing ancient Jews who assimilated into Greek culture after Judea's occupation by Alexander the Great). In 1987, Kahane opened a yeshiva (HaRaayon HaYehudi) with funding from U.S. supporters, for the teaching of "the Authentic Jewish Idea".

Despite the boycott, polls showed that Kahane's Kach would have likely received three to four seats in the coming November 1988 elections, with some earlier polls forecasting as many as twelve seats, possibly making Kach the third largest party.

=== Ban from running in elections ===
In response to the election of Kach's single representative and following up on the recommendation of the Supreme Court, the Knesset passed an amendment to the Elections Law, which stated:

A list of candidates shall not participate in elections to the Knesset if its objects or actions, expressly or by implication, include one of the following:

1. negation of the existence of the State of Israel as the state of the Jewish people;
2. negation of the democratic character of the State
3. incitement to racism

As a result, Kach was disqualified from running in the 1988 elections by the Central Elections Committee. The party once again appealed against the decision, with Kahane claiming that security needs were justification for discrimination against Arabs. This time the appeal was unsuccessful, with the court stating that the aims and action of Kach were "manifestly racist".

To protest their electoral ban, a group of Kach activists founded the Sicarii terrorist group in 1989. Their protests took the form of arson and graffiti attacks against Jewish left-wing political figures.

=== Kahane's death and party split ===
On 5 November 1990, Kahane was assassinated after making a speech in New York City. The prime suspect, El Sayyid Nosair, an Egyptian-born American citizen, was subsequently acquitted of murder, but convicted on gun possession charges. The party subsequently split in two due to disputes over tactics and personal conflicts within the party, with Binyamin Ze'ev Kahane (Kahane's son) leading a breakaway faction, Kahane Chai, based in Kfar Tapuach (an Israeli settlement in the West Bank), and Kach initially under the leadership of Rabbi Avraham Toledano (later replaced by Baruch Marzel) in Kiryat Arba. Both parties were banned from participating in the 1992 elections on the basis that they were followers of the original Kach.

=== Party ban on Kach and Kahane Chai ===
Following both parties noting their support of a 1992 grenade attack on the butchers' market of Jerusalem's Old City, government minister Amnon Rubinstein asked the Attorney General to launch criminal proceedings against both Kahane and Marzel on the charges of incitement to terrorism.

In 1994, both groups were banned outright by the Israeli cabinet under 1948 anti-terrorism laws, following statements in support of Baruch Goldstein's massacre of 29 Palestinians at the Cave of the Patriarchs (Goldstein himself was a Kach supporter). Many of their leaders spent time in Israeli jail under administrative detention, particularly Noam Federman, who spent more than 6 months in lockup without being indicted. Yigal Amir, who assassinated Prime Minister Yitzhak Rabin in 1995 who was in contact with "EYAL" (the Jewish Fighting Organization), a group established and headed by Avishai Raviv (a paid government informant) and portrayed as linked to Kach and Kahane Chai.

After being convicted for sedition for distributing pamphlets advocating violence against Arabs, Binyamin Ze'ev Kahane and his wife were killed in a Palestinian ambush in December 2000.

=== Aftermath ===
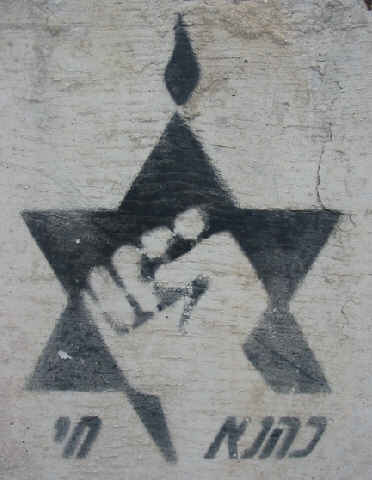
Kach logo spraypainted on a cement block reading "Kahane Chai"

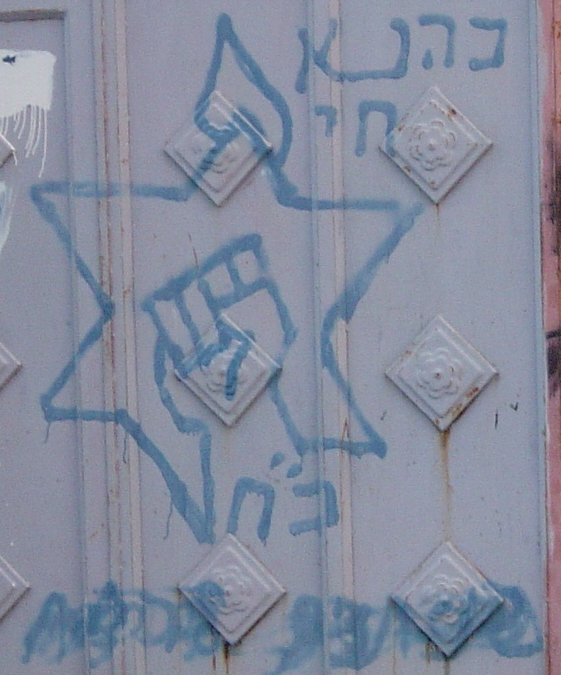
Kahanist graffiti in Hebron on a Palestinian home. The words to the top right say "Kahane Chai". The fist inside the Star of David is the party logo. Below is the acronym for "Kahane Chai" which is also the Hebrew word for strength.

Following the banning of Kach and Kahane Chai, the movements officially disbanded. The United States continued to designate the group as a terrorist organization by the early 2000s, saying that it engaged in terrorist activity by:

- using explosives or firearms with intent to endanger the safety of individuals or cause substantial damage to property (including an attempt to car bomb a Palestinian girls school in East Jerusalem)
- threatening and conspiring to carry out assassinations
- soliciting funds and members for a terrorist organization

The State Department also says that the group is suspected of involvement in a number of low-level attacks since the start of the Second Intifada in 2000.

In the 2003 elections, former Kach leader Baruch Marzel ran as number two on the Herut – The National Movement party list. The party narrowly missed obtaining a seat. In 2004, he founded the Jewish National Front, which gained 24,824 votes (0.7%) in the 2006 elections, less than half needed to win a seat. Michael Ben-Ari, elected to the Knesset in 2009 on the National Union list, where he represents Eretz Yisrael Shelanu, is a self-declared follower of Kahane who was involved with Kach for many years. Jewish National Front merged into Eretz Yisrael Shelanu prior to the election.

Former Kahane Chai chief executive Mike Guzofsky continues to solicit funds in the U.S., with the support of American Kahanists.

A 2009 Haaretz story accused Avigdor Lieberman of past membership in Kach, an accusation Lieberman denies.

A number of Kach followers, including Ben-Zion Gopstein, Baruch Marzel, Michael Ben-Ari, and Itamar Ben-Gvir, later became founding members and spokespeople for the segregationist Lehava movement. Otzma Yehudit is a Kahanist political party that includes many of the same followers, including Ben-Gvir and Marzel.

In May 2022, the United States removed the group from its list of terrorist organizations, citing inactivity.

== Political platform ==
The Kach party platform called for legislation on a variety of issues:

=== Arabs ===
- Every Arab inside Israel is to be offered the right of residence as a non-citizen. All non-Jews will have total personal rights and no national ones. Those who refuse the offer, and agree to leave quickly and peacefully, will receive compensation for their property, with 10% taken off and placed in a special fund for Sephardic Jews who left property behind in Arab countries and were never compensated.
- Until then, every Israeli Arab from the age of 18 will serve three years of manual labor, plus yearly manual duty as part of the reserves. The National Insurance Institute, which pays monthly checks for every Arab child until the age of 18, will be transferred to the Jewish Agency, and payment made only to Jews.
- An automatic death penalty shall be in force for every Arab terrorist caught.

=== Economy and employment ===
- A five-day-week of work will be introduced throughout the country, with Shabbat and Sunday being full days of rest. Sunday will be a day for freedom of entertainment, sport, and general pleasure, while the Shabbat will be a day of spiritual rest with no public desecration of the day.
- A free economy will be put into force, with regulations and licenses cut to a minimum, and the bureaucracy cut to the bone. Taxes will be cut, and capital investment welcome. Worker-participation in factories will be encouraged. The Histadrut will be limited to being a union only and will have to sell off its holdings. Only free enterprise that brings in foreign investment, and that encourages domestic capitalism and incentive, will allow Israel to escape its position as a beggar basket-case.
- Minimum wages will be raised to high levels, and underemployment compensation limited only to those who are incapable of working or can prove that they have not been able to find work. Jewish labor will be advocated.
- The huge amounts of budgetary funds that go to the Arab sector will be diverted to the needs of the Jewish underprivileged in the urban neighborhoods and the development towns.

=== Education ===
- A total re-organization of Jewish education in Israel shall be undertaken, including schools, the army, and state news media. All schools in Israel will be given a basic curriculum in Judaism and Jewish national pride. Parents who do not wish this can organize their own private schools, but with no government funding.

=== Foreign affairs ===
- The Aliyah Department shall be re-organized, with all emissaries recalled and a new system implemented under which a shaliach (emissary) sent to a foreign country will be one who himself came from this country.
- A special unit to deal properly with Jew-haters outside of Israel who threaten Jews there will be set up. There will be no sanctuary for murderers of Jews, Israelis or not.
- A special office to deal with the suffering Jews outside of Israel (Syria, Yemen, Ethiopia, etc.) will coordinate non-stop protests and pressures throughout the world.
- Political, cultural, social, and all non-economic ties with Germany and Austria will be ended. "We will expect the Germans to continue fully their obligations to Israel and victims of German atrocities. The Germans owe us reparations for property, and we owe them nothing. The money does not absolve them of one sin, of one crime, of one murder."
- The humiliation of United Nations defamation and degradation of Israel will be put to an end with Israel's withdrawal.

=== Land and sovereignty ===
- Immediate annexation of every part of Israel that is in our hands, and unlimited settlement for Jews everywhere in that area.
- Sovereignty from the Temple Mount shall be taken from the Muslims, and given to the Rabbinate. Jews will have unlimited access to those areas of the Temple Mount that are permitted entry by halakha, and a synagogue will be built immediately.
- Every young couple will be offered a dunam of free land to build a home with minimum mortgage. This will encourage young couples to leave the cities, and also to live in an environment of air and land, rather than cramped into tiny apartments in high-rise buildings.

=== Military ===
- The Army shall be given a free hand to shoot when it feels necessary at any attacker, including stone-throwers. The entire village of any terrorist, including stone-throwers, shall be expelled from the country.
- Every soldier during his three years of basic army service will learn a manual trade and will be given an opportunity, while in the army, to spend much of his last year at home working in that trade.
- All women will be exempt from army service but will be compelled to do national service in their neighborhoods and come home every night.
- A separate large army base shall be set up in which Haredi Jews will do their army service. Any full-time yeshiva student who does absolutely nothing else will be exempt. The many thousands of part-time yeshiva students will be doing army service at the special base.

=== Press ===
- Freedom of the press will be strictly enforced, with obligations. All correspondents and papers will be held to strict and truthful reporting of events, and no boycott of events will be allowed.

=== Religion ===
- A Jew will be defined only as one born to a Jewish mother or converted according to authentic halakha.
- Non-Orthodox temples and rabbis will be allowed the freedom to practice in Israel, but the use of the word "rav" will not be allowed ("rabbi" may be used), and no such place may use the word Beit Knesset ("temple" or "center" may be used).
- Re-organization of the religious courts will take place to ensure the choice of dayanim (judges) on merit, and to insist that procedures for divorces be streamlined and hurried.
- People of other faiths will be given total freedom to pray and worship and observe as they see fit, but never, ever, to proselytize.
- Intermarriage between Jews and Gentiles will be forbidden by law; respect for the Gentile will be demanded, but that will not include sharing his or her bed.

== Electoral history ==
Election	Leader	Votes	%	Seats	+/–
1973 (as 'The League List')	Meir Kahane	12,811	0.8	0 / 120	New
1977	Meir Kahane	4,396	0.3	0 / 120	Steady
1981	Meir Kahane	5,128	0.3	0 / 120	Steady
1984	Meir Kahane	25,907	1.2	1 / 120	▲1
1988	Meir Kahane	Party banned			▼1

== See also ==
- Arab–Israeli conflict
- Far-right politics in Israel
- Jewish Defense League
- Jewish Defense Organization
- Jewish religious terrorism
- Kahanism
