= Avraham Toledano =

Israeli politician

Avraham Toledano (Hebrew: אברהם טולדנו) is an Israeli politician. He was the Mashgiach ruchani of the Yeshivat Haraayon Hayehudi, and was number four on the Kach Knesset list in 1988. He was briefly the leader of Kach after Rabbi Meir Kahane was murdered, and before Baruch Marzel took over.

== Biography ==
Rabbi Toledano was born in Morocco and educated in France. He has a black belt in judo, and lives in the Israeli settlement of Kiryat Arba.
