= Gush Katif Museum =

Museum in Jerusalem, Israel

Coordinates: 31.7860°N 35.2091°E

- מוזיאון גוש קטיף
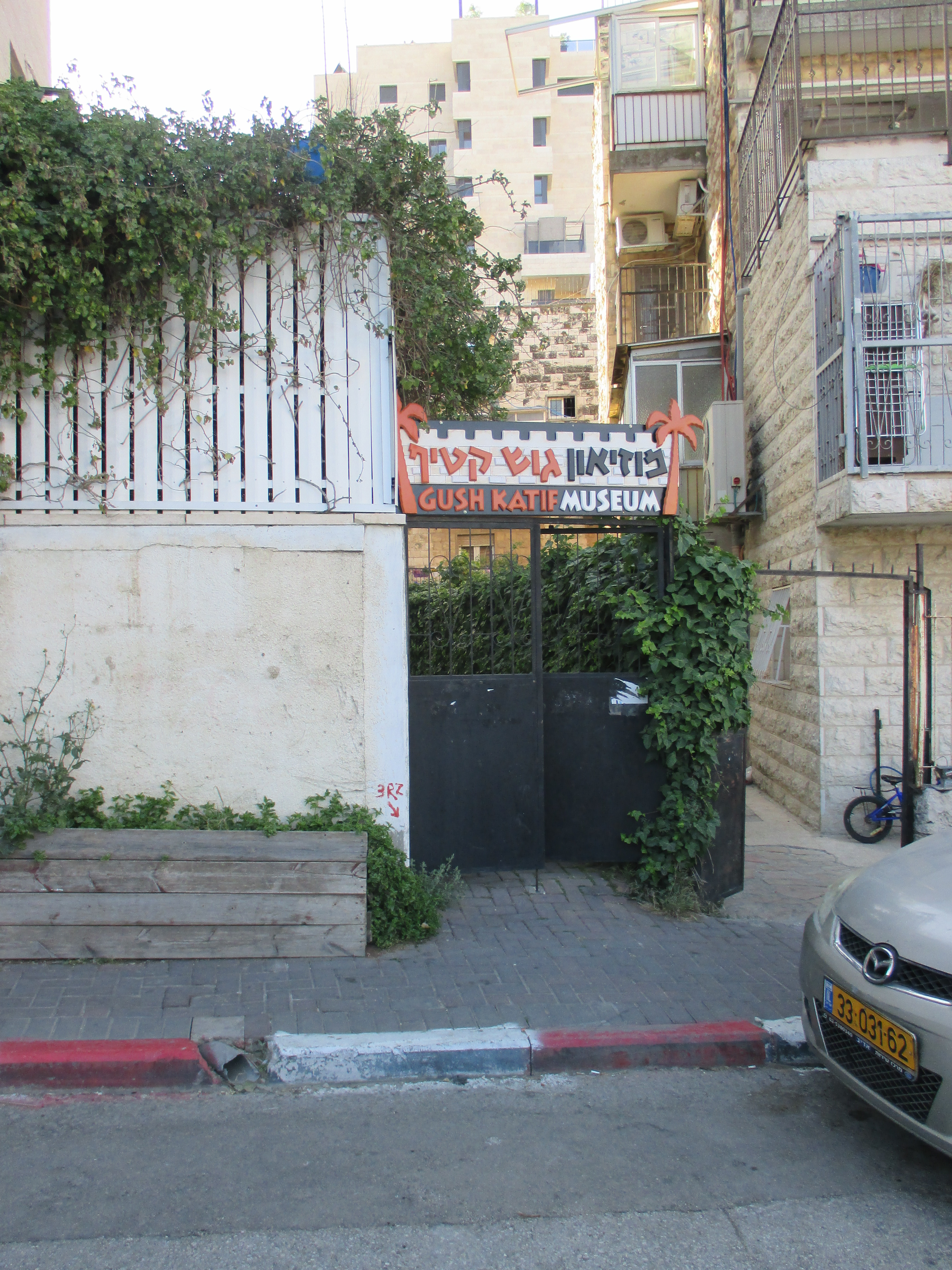
- Established: 2008
- Location: Shearei Tzedek Street 5, Jerusalem, Israel
- Type: Memorial Museum
- Owner: Gush Katif Private Museum in Jerusalem (association)
- Website: www.gushkatifmuseum.com

Gush Katif Museum (Hebrew: מוזיאון גוש קטיף) is a museum located in Jerusalem, Israel. The museum was founded in August 2008 and is mainly examining the Jewish settlement in the Gaza Strip from the Hasmonean dynasty to modern times. This includes an examination of the Jewish settlement in the Gaza Strip which, founded after the Six-Day War in 1967, existed until 2005.

The museum is located in the Nachlaot neighborhood in Jerusalem, near Mahane Yehuda Market.

One of the founders of the museum was Shalom Dov Wolpo, who was charged with "bribing soldiers to refuse to evacuate illegal West Bank outposts."

The purpose of the museum, according to its operators, is "to create a consciousness of remembrance, preservation and salute to the enterprise of Jewish settlement in the Gaza Strip, and to maintain a vigil of national consciousness in memory of the displacement of the settlements in Gush Katif and northern Samaria, as part of what was called the "disengagement plan".

The museum has 8 wings: introduction, settlement from 67, the orange wing, the black wing, the future, the movie hall, the library and the exhibition floor.

The museum was established by the association "Gush Katif Private Museum in Jerusalem", which their goal is to "Commemorate Gush Katif settlements". The association is considered to be right-leaning in Israeli politics. A large majority of the Israeli public over the years did not see the annexation of Gaza as a good or realistic idea.

After the start of the Gaza war on October 7th, 2023, museum guide Oded Mizrahi reported that the museum received an increase of visitors, as well as "interest from the international press."
