= Shalom Dov Wolpo =

Israeli rabbi and political activist (born 1948)

- שלום דוב וולפא
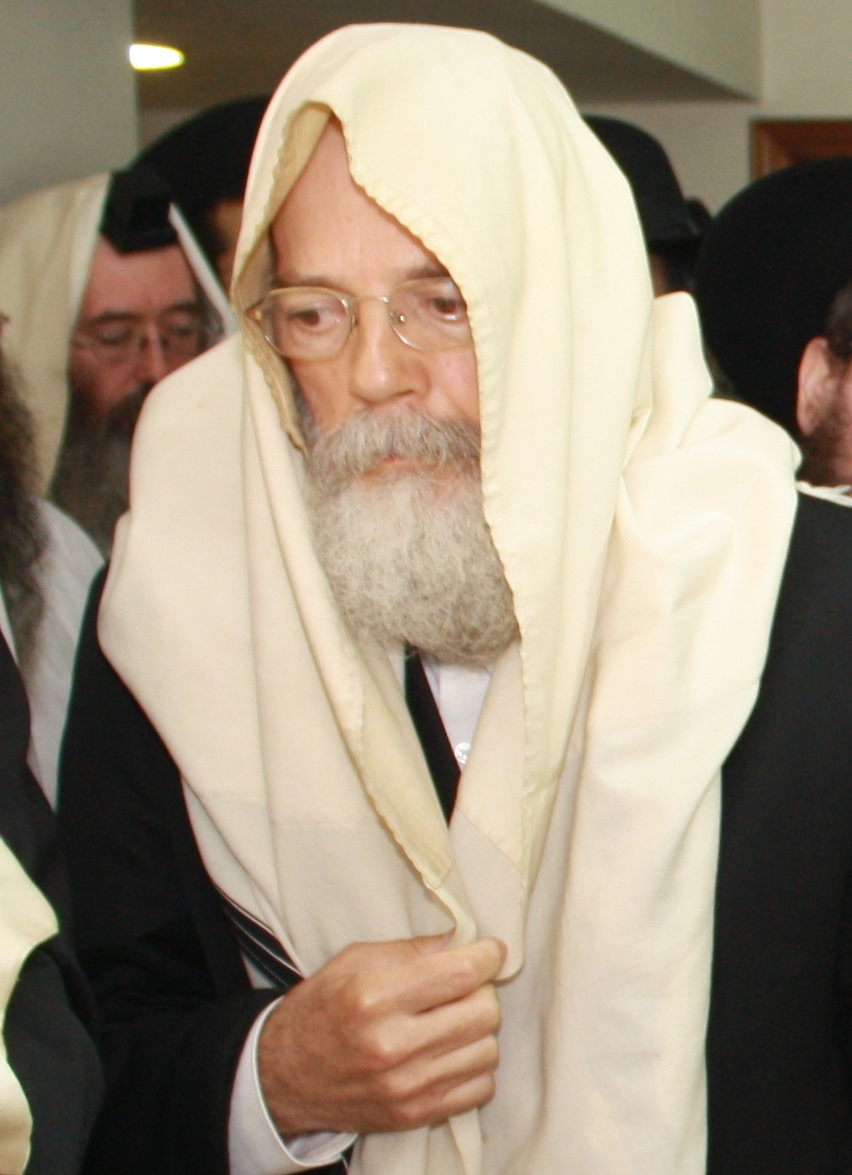
- Born: 1948 (age 77–78)
- Other name: Sholom Ber Wolpe
- Citizenship: Israel
- Occupations: Rabbi; Political activist
- Organization: SOS Israel
- Political party: Eretz Yisrael Shelanu

Rabbi Shalom Dov Wolpo, also Sholom Ber Wolpe, (Hebrew: שלום דוב וולפא; born February 21, 1948) is a rabbi and an Israeli political activist. Wolpo is the author of more than forty books.

He has become associated in recent years with right-wing political causes, and has set up a campaign group—SOS Israel—an organization that runs press and billboard campaigns promoting the belief that surrender of parts of the Land of Israel is prohibited by halacha. Later, in 2008, Wolpo established an additional group opposing land concessions, Our Land of Israel.

He also has called for an independent country called the State of Judea be established in the West Bank. According to J. J. Goldberg, he has raised funds to assist families of Jewish terrorists and called for courts to pass a sentence with a death penalty on a number of Israeli politicians such as Ehud Olmert, Ehud Barak, and Tzipi Livni.

== Chabad messianism ==
Wolpo is one of the leaders of the group of Chabad Chasidim believing that the late Lubavitcher Rebbe, Rabbi Menachem Mendel Schneerson, is the messiah. He was one of the first to openly describe Schneerson as the messiah. In 1984, he wrote a book proclaiming the rebbe as the Moshiach. However, after the rebbe said in a public address that "such a book can cause hundreds of Jews to stop learning Chassidus, and oppose the Baal Shem Tov and his teachings", he did not publish the book. It was later published in 1991 with the rebbe's approval.

== Politics ==
In January 2006, amid the Gaza disengagement, he wrote a letter to Olmert warning him that if he ever gave up even a "tiny parcel" of the Land of Israel, he would suffer from a bitter fate. The letter noted that Rabbi Schneerson had warned that he would personally fight with all his powers against any Prime Minister who gave up Israeli territory or backpedaled over settlements. He told the press that Ariel Sharon had brought about a "new holocaust" with the Gaza disengagement, and that he had gladly "collaborated with the Nazis of today". He ruled that assisting in the evacuation of the Gaza settlement was as bad as violating the Jewish Sabbath. He called for Olmert to be "brought to trial and punished".

Following the disengagement, he published a book entitled "Between Light and Dark", in which he shows that Rabbi Schneerson was right about rejecting Zionism and the claim of religious Zionists that the founding of the State is the "beginning of the redemption".

He is one of the founders of the Gush Katif Museum in Jerusalem's Nachlaot neighborhood.

=== SOS Israel ===
He is the founder of the organization Ha'Matteh L'Hatzolat Ha'Am V'Ha'Aretz—SOS Israel—a militant Judæan political movement opposed to the Two-state solution.

Another campaign run by his organization, under the slogan "There is Judgement, and there is a Judge" (referring to God), has generated considerable controversy in the Israeli press in March 2007. One radio host, Natan Zahavi, denounced Wolpo on the radio in obscene terms, and the Israeli Broadcasting Authority is currently investigating.

He later released a film under the SOS Israel name entitled "There is judgement, and there is a judge", which shows how all the political leaders that had a hand in the Gaza disengagement have suffered as a result - for example, Sharon suffered a stroke; former Chief of Staff Dan Halutz and Police Chief Moshe Karadi were forced to resign; President Moshe Katsav, former Minister Chaim Ramon, and MK Tzachi Hanegbi have been involved in criminal affairs; and Yonatan Bassi, head of the Disengagement Administration, had to leave his kibbutz after being accused of collaborating in driving settlers out of their homes. The film maintains that this is God's retribution. The film includes footage of Rabbi Schneerson declaring that making territorial concessions to the Syro-Palæstinian Arabs will lead to disaster and telling Katzav that "it would lead to the opposite of peace". Maariv reported that two million copies of the film were to be distributed, with the film to be made available for download online.

=== Recent activities ===
==== New political party ====
On 11 November 2008, Wolpo founded a new party, Eretz Yisrael Shelanu. The party allied itself with the Jewish National Front, and ran in the 2009 Knesset elections as part of the National Union alliance. Eretz Yisrael Shelanu took one of the party's four seats, taken by Michael Ben-Ari.

==== Textbooks ====
In a Halachic ruling, Wolpo ruled that it was forbidden to teach children from Israeli education ministry-approved textbooks that show maps of Israel with Green Line marked, as this was an attack on West Bank settlers. He told Maariv that Israeli education minister Yuli Tamir should "recall what happened to Ariel Sharon" before she attacked the settlement movement.

==== Controversial slogan ====
In February 2007, Wolpo appealed a decision that a political campaign under the slogan "If anyone comes to remove me from my home, I will chop off their hands" amounted to incitement to violence, since retired Supreme Court Justice Mishael Cheshin vowed to defend the Supreme Court, which he said was dear to him, with all his strength, saying, "If someone raises a hand against my house, I will cut it off", and he wasn't accused of anything. The slogan was meant to protest the removal of Jewish settlers from their West Bank homes.

==== Hananel Dayan ====
Wolpo arranged an elaborate award ceremony for Sergeant Hananel Dayan (son of Yosef Dayan), who was disciplined for refusing to shake the hand of Israeli Chief of Staff Dan Halutz. The soldier was protesting the forced eviction of his grandparents from their Gaza home in 2005.

==== Rabbi David Druckman ====
In 2006, Wolpo defended Rabbi David Drukman, chief rabbi of Kiryat Motzkin, over charges that he had abused his position as a state employee to incite violence. Wolpo said: "Rabbi Drukman will go down in history as someone who stood up to a vile government fearlessly."

==== Second Lebanon War ====
During the 2006 Second Lebanon War, he told the local Kiryat Gat weekly that, "Olmert has declared war against God and against His Torah", and that he should be brought to justice. He added that the war should continue "until the enemy has been totally eradicated".

==== Anti-Zionism ====
In 2006, offered a free copy of one of his book "From Light to Darkness" to anyone that pledged to refrain from celebrating Independence Day.

In 2007, he told a conference in Jerusalem that "the remedy for the disengagement is to understand that the State of Israel is a terrible thing. We should not bless or praise the state that was founded by criminals and heretics like Herzl."

==== Olmert hanging comments ====
In December 2007, Wolpo stated that his followers will establish the Kingdom of Judah if it is transferred to the Palestinians. It is unclear which part of Israel Wolpo and his followers would claim, or how they would achieve autonomous status.

Wolpo, addressing a demonstration against the Olmert government's peace moves with the Palestinian Authority, said that the prime minister, Vice Premier Chaim Ramon, Foreign Minister Tzipi Livni, and Defense Minister Ehud Barak would be "hung from the gallows", were Israel run properly.

"The terrible traitor, Ehud Olmert, who gives these Nazis weapons, who gives money, who frees their murderous terrorists, this man, like Ariel Sharon, collaborates with the Nazis", Wolpo said in the speech.

Yoel Hasson, a lawmaker with Olmert's Kadima party, said he would ask Israel's attorney general to take legal steps against Wolpo. The U.S.-based Orthodox Union issued a statement condemning the remarks.

Rabbi Wolpo said that the comments he made at the conference were twisted and taken out of context. In calling for the execution of state leaders by legal means, he was not calling for vigilante violence, he explained, but rather calling on the police to implement the law. Rabbi Wolpo wrote that he believes violence against a fellow Jew is unacceptable, but that law enforcement has the right and responsibility to enforce the law.

One of Israel's laws prohibits providing assistance to Nazis, he explained, and Muslim terrorist groups are the Nazis of our day. If the government provides terrorists with aid, he reasoned, then the government has violated the law, and its members must suffer the consequences, which can include the death penalty.

Rabbi Wolpo emphasized that he was calling for any such punishments to be carried out in a legal manner.
