= State of Judea =

Proposed Jewish state in the Palestinian West Bank

Proposed flag of Judea

Proposed location of the State of Judea

The State of Judea (Hebrew: מְדִינַת יְהוּדָה, romanized: Medīnat Yəhuda) is a proposed halachic state in the West Bank put forward by some members of the Israeli settlement movement. After the Palestine Liberation Organization (PLO) declared the existence of the State of Palestine in 1988, some settler activists (primarily Kahanists) feared that international pressure would lead Israel to withdraw from the West Bank and sought to lay the groundwork for an Orthodox Jewish state in the West Bank if this came to pass.

== History ==
The self-proclaimed establishment of this state was announced in a Jerusalem hotel on 27 December 1988. Veteran Kahanist Michael Ben-Horin was declared president of the unrecognised State of Judea. In January 1989, several hundred activists met and announced their intention to create such a state if Israel withdrew. In 1993, Israeli settlers announced that they were forming a "Judean Police" unit in preparation for establishing a declared independent State of Judea if Israel withdrew from the area. Later in the year, they declared they would shoot any member of the Palestinian Civil Police Force if they felt they had to declare a state of Judea. This led to an Israeli crackdown on far-right settler movements trying to advance the cause of an independent State of Judea.

The idea was revived following the Israeli disengagement from Gaza, which resulted in the forcible withdrawal of Jewish settlers from the Gaza Strip by the Israel Defense Forces in 2005. In 2007, Rabbi Shalom Dov Wolpo suggested the establishment of a new state in the West Bank in the event of Israeli withdrawal.

== Flag ==
The flag of Judea is very similar to the flag of Israel. Like the flag of Israel, it depicts a blue symbol on a white background, between two horizontal blue stripes, but unlike the flag of Israel the symbol is a Temple menorah instead of a Star of David. Another version features a Star of David of a different sort than appears on the flag of Israel, together with some other symbols.
