= Far-right politics in Israel =

Far-right politics in Israel encompasses ideologies such as ultranationalism, Jewish supremacy, Jewish fascism, Jewish fundamentalism, anti-Arabism, and ideological movements such as neo-Zionism and Kahanism. In the 2020s, the term "far-right" has been mainly used to describe advocates of policies such as the expansion of Israeli settlements in the West Bank, opposition to Palestinian statehood, and imposition of Israeli sovereignty over the Gaza Strip, the West Bank, and East Jerusalem.

== Mandatory Palestine (1920–1948) ==
=== Revisionist Zionism ===
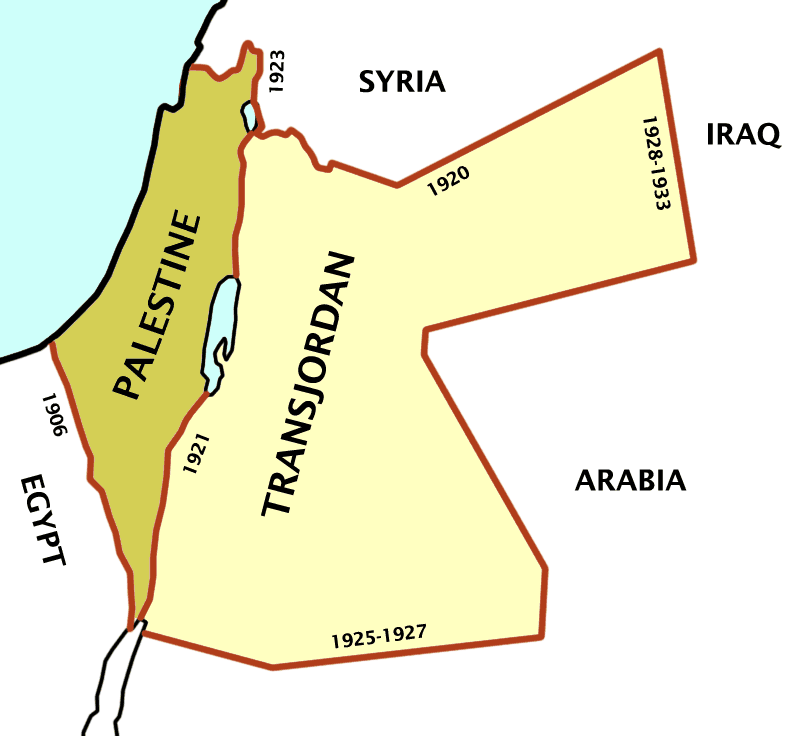
History of Revisionist Zionism: The British included Transjordan within the borders of the British Mandate for Palestine, at the same time excluding it from Jewish settlement.

Revisionist Zionism's ideological and cultural roots were influenced by Italian fascism. Ze'ev Jabotinsky, the founder of Revisionist Zionism, believed that Britain could no longer be trusted to advance Zionism, and that Fascist Italy, as a growing political challenger to Britain, was therefore an ally.

=== Betar ===
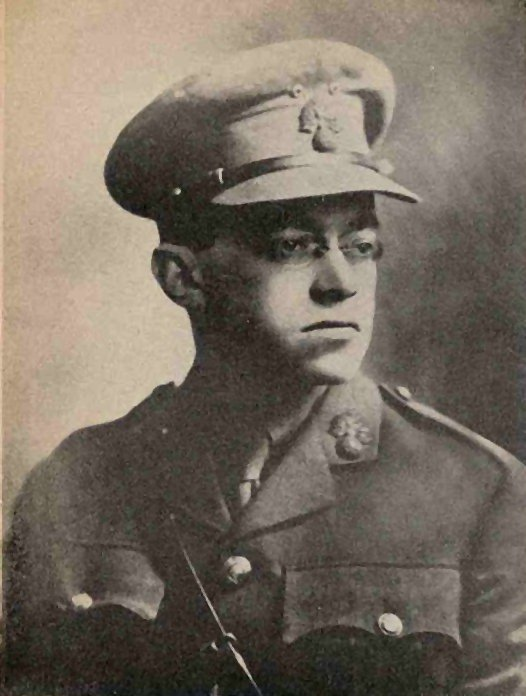
Ze'ev Jabotinsky, the founder and first leader of Betar, shown here in Jewish Legion uniform.

In 1923, Jabotinsky established the Revisionist Zionist youth movement Betar at a meeting in Riga, Latvia. 2 years later in 1925, the Revisionist "Hatzohar" Party was established, as a movement that existed separate from the main Zionist movement, the World Zionist Organization. The term "revisionist" referred to a revision of the World Zionist Organization's policies at the time. The Irgun, a Revisionist Zionist paramilitary organization, established by Avraham Tehomi in 1931, opposed British rule over Palestine, and was engaged in acts of terrorism against British officers and Arabs, in an attempt to expel them from the land and achieve Jewish sovereignty. The Irgun joined forces with Betar and Hatzohar in 1937.

=== Revisionist Maximalism ===
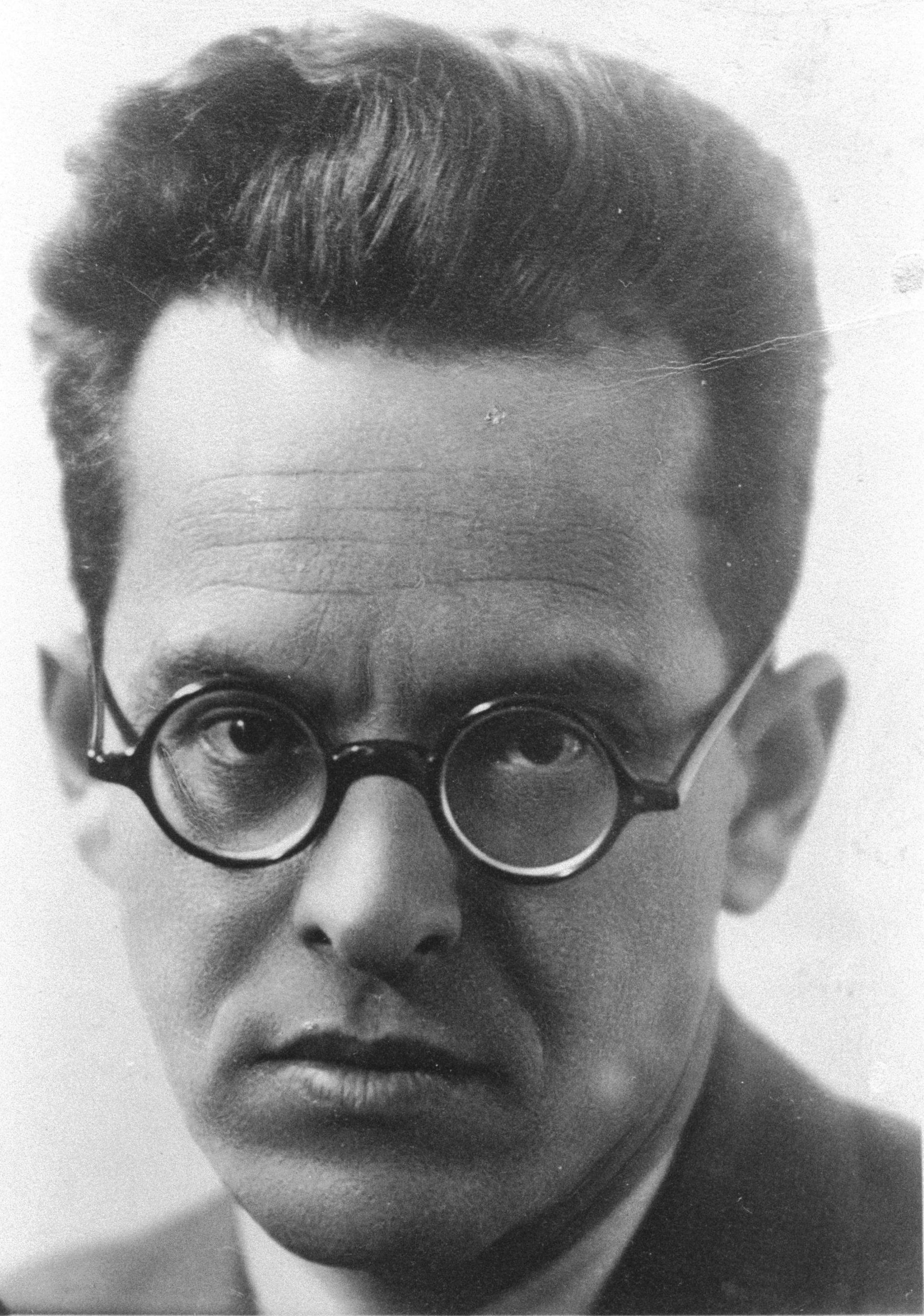
Abba Ahimeir, the founder of Revisionist Maximalism.

Revisionist Maximalism was a short-lived right-wing militant political ideology that was a part of the Brit HaBirionim faction of the Zionist Revisionist Movement created by Abba Ahimeir. Ahimeir was born in Russia in 1897 and migrated to Palestine at the age of fifteen. In 1928 Ahimeir joined Jabotinsky's Revisionist movement and became one of the movement's important activists.

In 1930, Brit HaBirionim under Ahimeir's leadership publicly declared their desire to form a fascist state. The Revisionist Maximalist movement borrowed principles from totalitarianism and fascism and it also drew inspiration from Józef Piłsudski's Poland and Benito Mussolini's Italy. Revisionist Maximalists strongly supported the Italian fascist regime of Benito Mussolini and wanted the creation of a Jewish state based on fascist principles.

The goal of the Maximalists was to "extract Revisionism from its liberal entrapment", because they wanted Ze'ev Jabotinsky's status to be elevated to the status of a dictator, and desired to forcibly assimilate the population of Palestine into Hebrew society. The Maximalists believed that authoritarianism and national solidarity was necessary to have the public collaborate with the government, and to create total unity in Palestine.

=== Irgun ===
The Irgun (Hebrew: ארגון), officially the National Military Organization in the Land of Israel, (Note: Hebrew: הארגון הצבאי הלאומי בארץ ישראל, romanized: HaIrgun HaTzvaʾi Ha-Leumi b-Eretz Israel) often abbreviated as Etzel (אצ״ל) or IZL, was a Zionist paramilitary organization that operated in Mandatory Palestine between 1931 and 1948. It was an offshoot of the older and larger Jewish paramilitary organization Haganah.

The Irgun policy was based on Revisionist Zionism, founded by Ze'ev Jabotinsky. Two of the most infamous operations for which the Irgun were known were the bombing of the British administrative headquarters for Mandatory Palestine in Jerusalem on 22 July 1946 and the Deir Yassin massacre, carried out with Lehi on 9 April 1948.

The organization committed acts of terrorism against Palestinian Arabs, as well as against the British authorities, who were regarded as illegal occupiers. In particular the Irgun was described as a terrorist organization by the United Nations, British, and United States governments; in media such as The New York Times newspaper; as well as by the Anglo-American Committee of Inquiry, the 1946 Zionist Congress, and the Jewish Agency. Hannah Arendt and Albert Einstein, in a letter to The New York Times in 1948, compared Irgun and its successor Herut party to "Nazi and Fascist parties" and described it as a "terrorist, right wing, chauvinist organization".

Following the establishment of the State of Israel during the 1948 Palestine war, the Irgun began to be absorbed into the newly created Israel Defense Forces. Conflict between the Irgun and the IDF escalated into the 1948 Altalena Affair, and the Irgun formally disbanded on 12 January 1949. The Irgun was a political predecessor to Israel's right-wing Herut ("Freedom") party, which led to today's Likud party. Likud has led or been part of most Israeli governments since 1977.

=== Lehi ===
The hand represents the Lehi salute, with only two raised fingers on the right hand to represent the "If I forget thee / O Jerusalem...may my right hand forget its skill" (Ps. 137:5) pledge. The acronym "Lehi" is written below the hand.

The Lehi, also known as the Stern Gang, was a Revisionist Zionist militant group, founded by Avraham Stern in Mandatory Palestine in 1940. The group split from the Irgun, and sought a similar alliance with Fascist Italy. Lehi also believed that Nazi Germany was less of an enemy of the Jews than Britain was, and attempted to form an alliance with the Nazis, proposing a Jewish state based on "nationalist and totalitarian principles, and linked to the German Reich by an alliance". Avraham Stern, then commander of the Lehi, objected to the White Paper of 1939, British plans to restrict Jewish immigration and Jewish land purchase in Palestine, and proposed the creation of a binational Jewish-Arab Palestine. calling for an armed struggle against the British instead.

== History in Israel ==
=== 1948–1967 ===
Far right activity in the early years of the State of Israel was partly inspired by the legacy of the British mandate. In 1948, Irgun and Lehi refused to disband and challenged the authority of the Israeli government under David Ben-Gurion. In 1951, a failed attempt to blow up the Knesset was made by an extreme Jewish organization that advocated Halakha-based state.

=== After the 1967 Six-Day War ===
In the aftermath of the 1967 Six-Day War, Israel captured the Golan Heights, the West Bank, the Sinai Peninsula, and the Egyptian-occupied Gaza Strip. This victory resulted in the revival of "territorial maximalism", with aspirations to annex and settle these new territories. leading some Israeli political leaders to argue for the redefinition of the country's borders in accordance with the vision of Greater Israel. The Movement for Greater Israel, which emerged about a month after the Six-Day War ended, advocated for the control over all of the territories captured during the war, including the Sinai Peninsula, West Bank, and Golan Heights. The members of the movement demanded immediate imposition of Israeli sovereignty over the territories. The supporters of the movement were united by a territorial maximalist ideology. During the summer of 1967, far-right nationalists began to establish settlements in the occupied West Bank to establish a Jewish presence on the land. Menachem Begin's agreement to return the Sinai Peninsula to Egypt, as well as his initiation of the Autonomy Plan, caused parts of the political right to radicalise and adopt far-right political ideologies.

=== Kach party (1971–1994) ===
Flag of Kach, a former ultranationalist political party in Israel

The Kach party, founded by Meir Kahane in 1971, was a far-right Orthodox Jewish, Religious Zionist political party in Israel. The party's ideology, known as Kahanism, advocated the transfer of the Arab population from Israel, and the creation of a Jewish theocratic state, in which only Jews have voting rights. Kach additionally argued that Israel should annex the 1967 Israeli-occupied territories because of their religious significance. The party's motto, "Rak Kach" lit. 'Only thus', was derived from the motto of the Irgun, a Zionist militant organization active in the 1940s. In the 1973 Israeli legislative election, Kach won 0.81% of the total votes, falling short to pass the electoral threshold, which was 1% at the time. In the next elections in 1977, Kach failed once again to win enough votes for parliamentary presence. Kach earned a single seat in the Knesset in the 1984 Israeli legislative election.

Shortly after Meir Kahane was sworn in as a member of the Knesset, he made his first media-oriented provocation by announcing his plan to open an emigration office in the Arab village of Umm al-Fahm. He stated that his plan was to offer residents of the village financial incentives to leave their homes and the country. The town declared a general strike shortly after, and roughly 30,000 people, including liberal Jews, arrived at Umm-al-Fahm to prevent Kahane from entering the town. The Israel Police initially decided to accompany Kahane with 1000 police officers as he marched, but later decided to cancel Kahane's march altogether, in concern of negative consequences.

Kach activists frequently entered Arab localities in Israel, distributing propaganda leaflets in demonstrations, provocatively raising the Israeli flag, making Arabs sign the Israeli Declaration of Independence, threatening them against moving to majority-Jewish towns, and convincing Arabs to leave the country. Some of Meir Kahane's legislative initiatives were mostly related to the "Arab problem" in Israel, intending to separate Jews and Arabs in public swimming pools, banning romantic relations between Jews and Arabs, and revoking the citizenship of Arabs in Israel. In his book, "They Must Go", Kahane wrote: "There is only one path for us to take: the immediate transfer of Arabs from Eretz Yisrael. For Arabs and Jews in Eretz Yisrael there is only one answer: separation, Jews in their land, Arabs in theirs. Separation. Only separation."

One bill which he proposed required the imposition of a mandatory death penalty on any non-Jew who either harmed or attempted to harm a Jew, as well as the automatic deportation of the perpetrator's family and the perpetrator's neighbors from Israel and the West Bank. The Supreme of Israel struck down his initiatives, on the grounds that there was no precedent and provision for them in the Basic Laws of Israel. To limit the potential influence of anti-democratic parties such as Kach, the Knesset, in 1985, proposed a new amendment to exclude parties that negate the democratic character of Israel. Kach was later barred from the 1988 elections, and its appeal was denied by the Supreme Court. 1994, following Baruch Goldstein's massacre of 29 Palestinians at the Cave of the Patriarchs, Israel designated Kach, for which Goldstein previously stood as a Knesset Candidate, as a terror organization.

=== The Oslo Accords and the 1995 assassination of Yitzhak Rabin ===
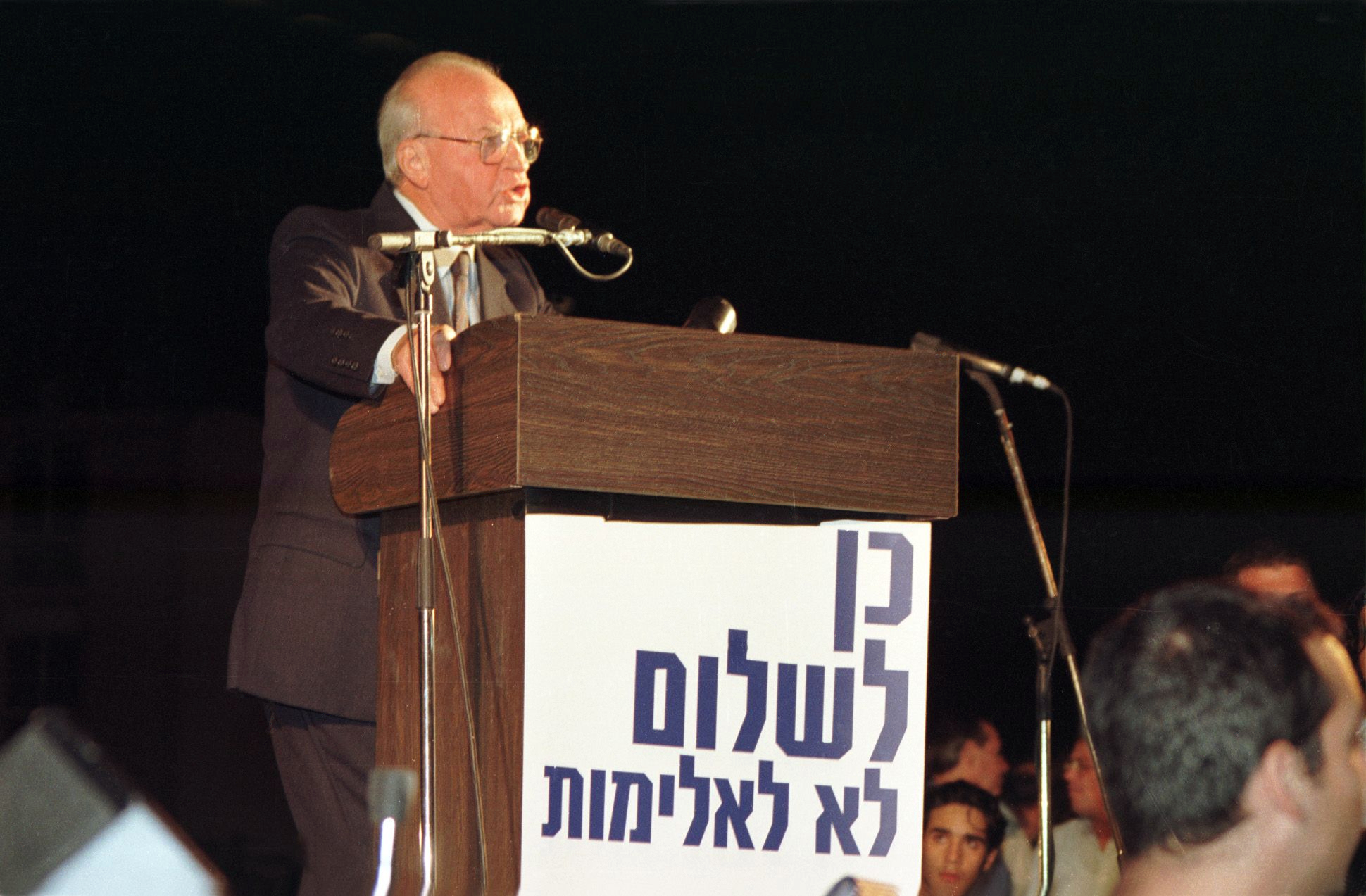
Rabin delivering his speech at the 4 November 1995 rally, shortly before his assassination

The far-right in Israel opposed the Oslo Accords, with Prime Minister Yitzhak Rabin being assassinated in 1995 by a right-wing Israeli extremist for signing them. Yigal Amir, Rabin's assassin, had opposed Rabin's peace process, particularly the signing of the Oslo Accords, because he felt that an Israeli withdrawal from the West Bank would deny Jews their "biblical heritage which they had reclaimed by establishing settlements". Rabin was also criticized by right-wing conservatives and Likud leaders who perceived the peace process as an attempt to forfeit the occupied territories and a surrender to Israel's enemies. After the murder, it was revealed that Avishai Raviv, a well-known right-wing extremist at the time, was a Shin Bet agent and informant. Prior to Rabin's murder, Raviv was filmed with a poster of Israeli prime minister Yitzhak Rabin in an SS uniform. His mission was to monitor the activities of right-wing extremists, and he allegedly knew of Yigal Amir's plans to assassinate Rabin.

=== 2005 Israeli disengagement from Gaza ===
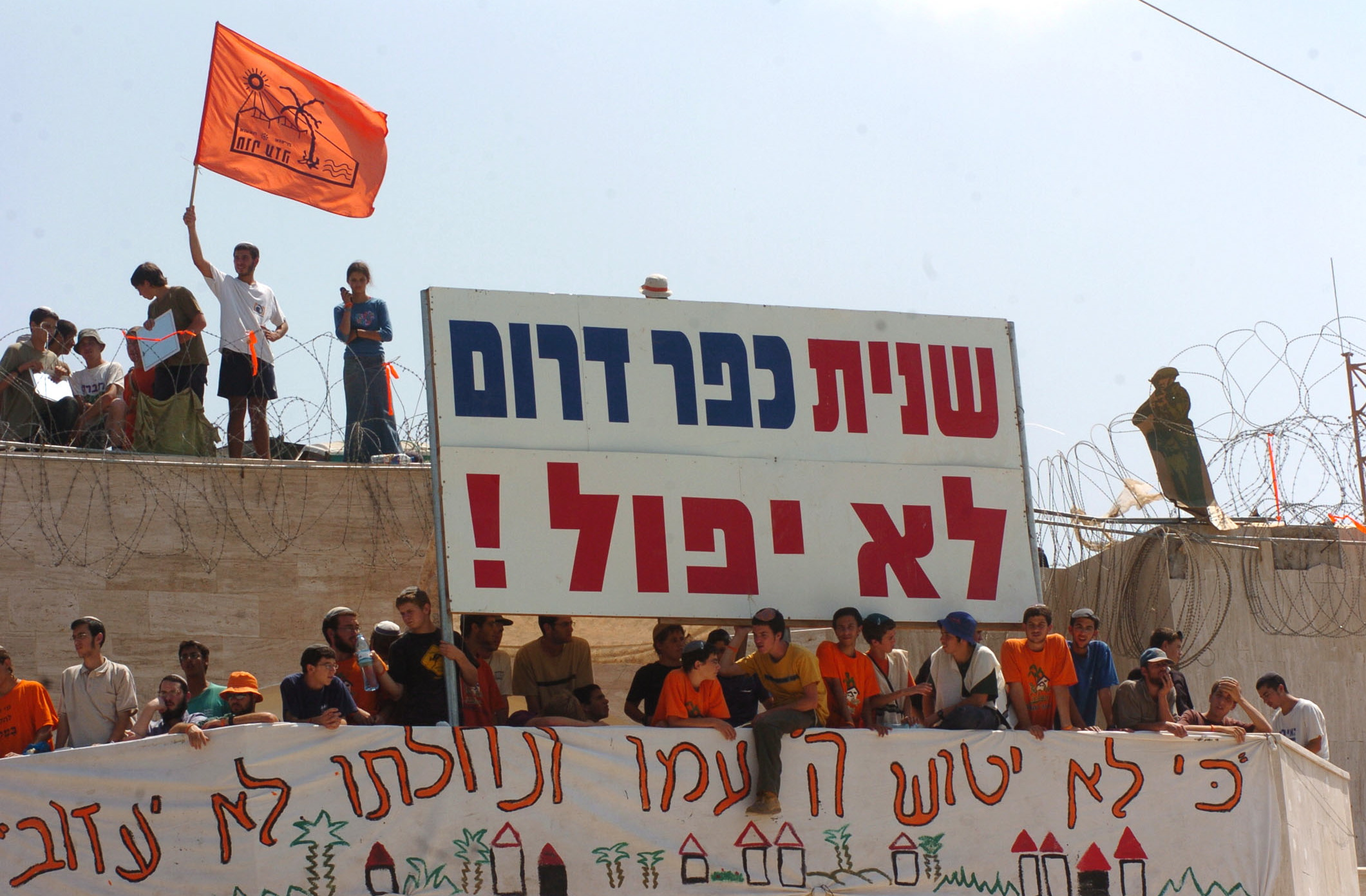
Protest against the evacuation of the Israeli settlement Kfar Darom

The Israeli disengagement from Gaza, headed by Ariel Sharon, included the removal of all Jewish settlements in the Gaza Strip as well as several West Bank settlements, and resulted in protests and riots from Jewish settlers. Posters covering the streets stated that "Ariel Sharon had no right to give up parts of the Land of Israel". The settlers managed to secure the support of Ovadia Yosef, then-leader of Shas party, who instructed Shas members of the Knesset to vote against the disengagement plan. Three settlers burned themselves alive in protest of the disengagement. By September 12, 2005, the eviction of all settlers from the Gaza Strip and demolition of their houses was completed, bringing Israel's 38 years of military rule over the Gaza Strip to a halt.

== Political parties in 21st century ==
=== Moledet (1988–2013) ===
Moledet (Hebrew: מולדת, lit. 'Homeland') was a minor party established by Rehavam Ze'evi in 1988. Prior to the 1999 elections, the party joined the National Union alliance alongside Herut – The National Movement and Tkuma. The alliance joined the government formed by Ariel Sharon on 7 March 2001 after he won the election for Prime Minister, and Ze'evi was appointed Minister of Tourism. However, Ze'evi was assassinated by the Popular Front for the Liberation of Palestine (PFLP) on 17 October 2001. Prior to the 2006 elections, the National Union formed an alliance with the National Religious Party. In the lead up to the 2013 elections, Tkuma merged with the Jewish Home.

=== Religious Zionist Party (1998–2023) ===
The Religious Zionist Party (Hebrew: הציונות הדתית, romanized: HaTzionut HaDatit, lit. 'The Religious Zionism'), known as Tkuma (Hebrew: תקומה, lit. 'Revival') until 2021 and officially known as National Union–Tkuma (Hebrew: האיחוד הלאומי-תקומה, HaIchud HaLeumi–Tkuma), is a far-right, ultra-nationalist, and religious Zionist political party in Israel. In all the elections since its founding in 1998, the party has joined other factions and competed as part of a united list.

=== Otzma Yehudit (founded 2012) ===
Otzma Yehudit Party logo

Otzma Yehudit was founded in 2012 by Michael Ben-Ari, a former member of Kach. In the 2021 Israeli legislative election, Itamar Ben-Gvir, a follower of Kach, was elected to the Knesset as a representative of the Otzma Yehudit party. Since 2022, Ben-Gvir has served as a Minister of National Security, and the party presently holds six seats in the Knesset. Lehava, one of the largest far-right organizations in Israel, advocates for the segregation and oppression of Palestinians. It has also been involved in acts of violence against Palestinians, LGBT individuals, and Christians. Both the United States and the United Kingdom have imposed sanctions on Lehava.

=== Noam (founded 2019) ===
Noam is a far-right Orthodox Jewish, Religious Zionist political party in Israel, established in July 2019 by a conservative faction in the Religious Zionist community inspired by Rabbi Zvi Thau and his Har Hamor Yeshiva. The party's main goal is to advance policies against LGBT rights, and against what its backers call "the destruction of the family". Avi Maoz, the party's leader, was elected to the Knesset in 2021, and is the party's sole representative.

== 2020s ==
=== 2022 Likud-led coalition ===
The 37th Cabinet of Israel, formed on December 29, 2022, following the Knesset election on November 1, 2022, has been described as the most right-wing government in Israeli history, as well as Israel's most religious government. The coalition government consists of seven parties—Likud, United Torah Judaism, Shas, Religious Zionist Party, Otzma Yehudit, and New Hope—and is led by Benjamin Netanyahu.

Following its formation, the coalition faced immediate domestic and international backlash over its political alignment and policy proposals. Human rights organizations, including B'Tselem, Amnesty International, and Human Rights Watch, characterized the ruling coalition's platform as racist and discriminatory toward Palestinians, Arab citizens of Israel, and immigrants, warning that its agenda posed a direct threat to democratic institutions and human rights. U.S. President Joe Biden said the government contained "some of the most extreme" members he had ever seen.

=== Far-right Israeli politicians and the Al Aqsa Mosque ===
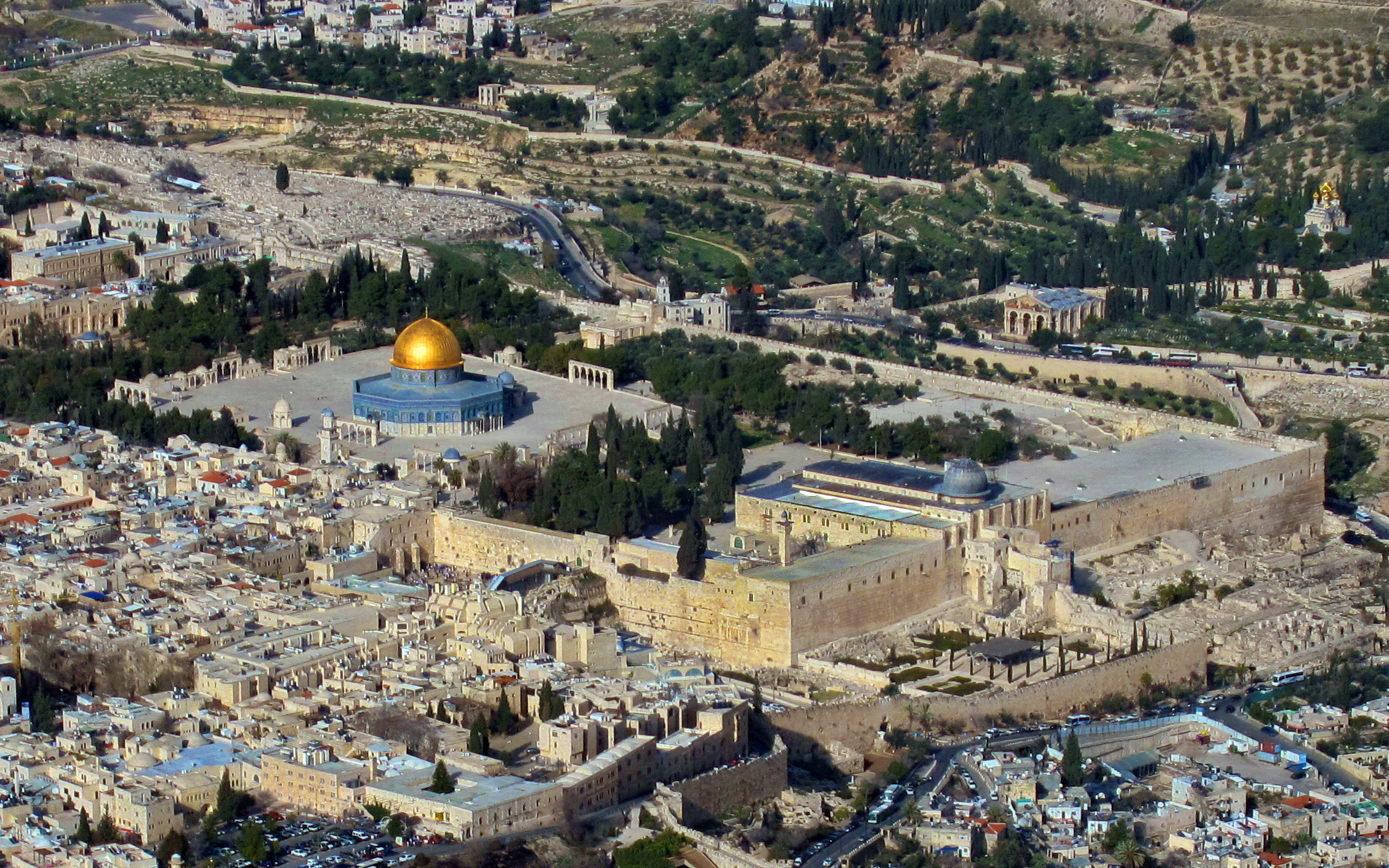
The Al-Aqsa Mosque compound and surrounding area of Jerusalem.

The Al-Aqsa mosque compound (Note: There are two buildings in the Al-Aqsa compound, the large prayer hall that is formally referred to in English as "Al-Aqsa mosque" and the ornate central building known in English as the "Dome of the Rock", but colloquially both are referred to as "Al-Aqsa Mosque" or simply "Al-Aqsa". Muslims believe the site is the location where the prophet Mohammed (the founder of Islam) ascended to heaven in the 7th century AD. Israelis refer to the location as the Temple Mount, because it is thought to be the location of the second temple, which was destroyed by the Romans in the 1st century AD.) (which Israelis refer to as the "Temple Mount") is the third holiest site in Islam and a Palestinian national symbol.

In 2023 and 2024, National Security Minister Itamar Ben-Gvir initiated at least four marches to the Al-Aqsa compound in East Jerusalem, each of up to a thousand ultra nationalist Israeli settlers. During the visits, Ben Gvir stated that his he intends to convey a political message. The Palestinian Authority's spokesman, Nabil Abu Rudeineh, described his visits as "blatant attacks" on the Al-Aqsa Mosque, while Jordan's Ministry of Foreign Affairs described them as "a provocative step that is condemned, and a dangerous and unacceptable escalation".

=== 2023 Huwara attacks ===
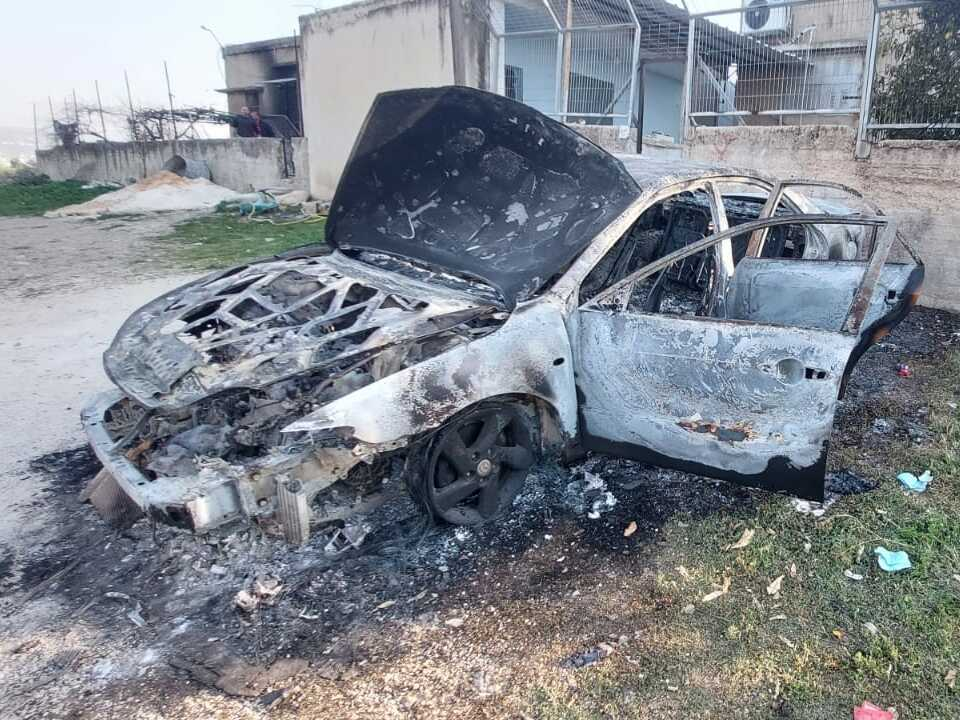
a burnt car in Hawara

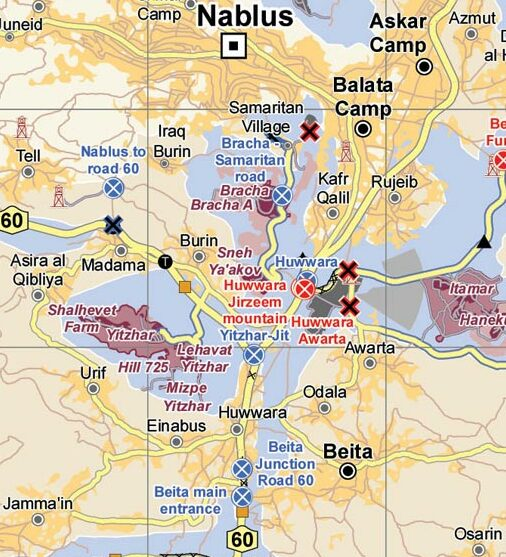
Map of the surrounding area, showing Nablus and Balata Camp nearby, and several Israeli settlements.

On 26 February 2023, in retaliation for the shooting of two Israeli settlers earlier the same day by an unidentified attacker, hundreds of Israeli settlers went on a violent late-night rampage in Huwara and other Palestinian villages in the Israeli-occupied West Bank, leaving one civilian dead and 100 other Palestinians injured, four critically, and the town ablaze. It was the worst attack stemming from Israeli settler violence in the northern West Bank in decades.

Israeli soldiers were in the area while the rampage by the settlers unfolded and did not intervene. The rampage was called a pogrom by an Israeli commander in charge of the area.

Israeli and Palestinian officials issued a joint declaration in Aqaba, Jordan to counter the recent round of Israeli–Palestinian violence.

In the rampage's aftermath, Israeli Finance Minister Bezalel Smotrich, a far-right politician partly in charge of the administration of the West Bank, called for Huwara to be "wiped out" by the Israeli army. Condemnations from the United States, European Union, and Arab countries led to Smotrich retracting his comments and claiming they were said in the heat of the moment.

== Gaza war ==
Israel's far-right ministers have made controversial comments during the Gaza war.

- Agriculture Minister Avi Dichter (Likud) told Israeli Channel 12 in November 2023 that the war would be "Gaza's Nakba", using the Arabic word for "catastrophe" that many use to describe the 1948 displacement of roughly 700,000 Palestinians.
- Heritage Minister Amihai Eliyahu (Otzma Yehudit) said in an interview in November 2023 that dropping a nuclear bomb on the Gaza Strip was "one of the possibilities".
- Finance Minister Bezalel Smotrich (Religious Zionist Party) said in a November 2023 letter that Palestinians should be excluded from "security zones" in the occupied West Bank even to "harvest olives". He has also called for the creation of "sterile security zones" around settlements in the West Bank to "prevent Arabs from entering".
- Minister for the Advancement of Women May Golan (Likud) said in a speech in February 2024 "I am personally proud of the ruins of Gaza, and that every baby, even 80 years from now, will tell their grandchildren what the Jews did."

== General strategy and courses of action ==
The far-right in Israel have used a variety of ways over the years to achieve their political goals. These include far-right parties such as Kach, Otzma Yehudit, and Eretz Yisrael Shelanu being represented in the Knesset, Israel's parliament.

Establishment of unauthorized Israeli outposts in the West Bank is also common among far-right extremist groups, such as the Hilltop Youth.

Jewish extremist terrorism was carried out by extremists within Judaism, including the assassination of Palestinian mayors by the Jewish Underground group, the Cave of the Patriarchs massacre, the murder of the boy Mohammed Abu Khdeir, and the Duma arson attack. Further, "price tag attacks" have been committed in the occupied West Bank by extremist Israeli settler youths against Palestinian Arabs, and to a lesser extent against left-wing Israelis, Israeli Arabs, Christians, and Israeli security forces.

Finally, political violence committed by far-right extremists, such as the murder of Emil Grunzweig, the attempted assassination of Zeev Sternhell, and the Assassination of Yitzhak Rabin.

== See also ==
- One-state solution
- Conservatism in Israel
- Jewish fundamentalism
- Politics of Israel
