= Otzma Yehudit =

Israeli far-right political party

Otzma Yehudit עוצמה יהודית عظمة يهودية
- Leader: Itamar Ben-Gvir
- Founder: Michael Ben-Ari; Aryeh Eldad
- Founded: 13 November 2012 (as Otzma LeYisrael)
- Merger of: Jewish National Front; Hatikva
- Split from: National Union; Eretz Yisrael Shelanu
- Headquarters: Jerusalem
- Ideology: Kahanism; Ultranationalism; Anti-Arab racism; Jewish supremacism; Settler interests
- Political position: Far-right
- Religion: Orthodox Judaism
- National affiliation: Yachad (2015); URWP (2019); Religious Zionist Party (2021–2022; 2022)
- Knesset: 7 / 120

Election symbol
- נץ (2013, 2020) כף (2019) ב (2026)

Website
- ozma-yeudit.co.il

Otzma Yehudit (Hebrew: עָצְמָה יְהוּדִית, lit. 'Jewish Power' or 'Jewish Strength') is a far-right, ultranationalist, and Kahanist political party in Israel. The party was founded on 13 November 2012 as Otzma LeYisrael (Hebrew: עָצְמָה לְיִשְׂרָאֵל; lit. 'Strength for Israel') and is the ideological descendant of the outlawed Kach party. It has seven members in the Knesset.

The party advocates for the deportation of those who they consider to be the "enemies of Israel", and leader Itamar Ben-Gvir was associated with the original Kach movement, though he now disagrees with the stance of deporting all Arabs from Israel. The party has been widely described in the international press as an extremist, ultranationalist, and racist organisation supporting Jewish supremacy and has been described by multiple sources, including the Israeli sociologist Eva Illouz, as a "Jewish fascist group".

Otzma ran independently in the 2013 election and as part of a list with ultra-Orthodox party Yachad in 2015. Though in both elections Otzma did not manage to pass the electoral threshold, the Yachad list was around 10,000 votes short of the threshold. Ahead of the first 2019 election, the party ran with the Jewish Home as part of the Union of Right-Wing Parties, after Naftali Bennett abandoned the Jewish Home to form the New Right party. While the Union of Right-Wing Parties passed the threshold, winning five seats, Otzma only held the seventh spot on the list, as their other representative, Michael Ben-Ari, was banned for incitement. After Ben-Ari was banned, Ben-Gvir was appointed leader of the party.

The party ran independently in the second 2019 election, winning 1.88% of the vote, though some polls had predicted that the party would pass the threshold. Despite coming to an agreement with the Jewish Home to contest the 2020 Israeli legislative election as the United Jewish Home, Otzma was left to run independently when the Jewish Home, the New Right, and Tkuma re-formed Yamina. In the 2021 election, Otzma ran on a joint list with the Religious Zionist Party and Noam, as part of a deal orchestrated by Prime Minister Benjamin Netanyahu, that would include the list receiving an extra seat from the Likud list. Following the 2021 election, Ben-Gvir won a seat, with the deal considered to have brought the party into the mainstream of Israeli politics. The party won an additional five seats in the 2022 elections. The party gained an additional seat in January 2025, but lost it in April as Religious Zionist Party MK Zvi Sukkot re-entered the Knesset and replaced Otzma MK Almog Cohen. The party won seven seats in the 2026 Israeli legislative election.

== Background ==
Aryeh Eldad was first elected to the Knesset on the National Union list in 2003. In November 2007, Eldad formed a new secular far-right party named Hatikva. Ultimately, Hatikva ran as a faction of the National Union in the 2009 elections, and Eldad retained his seat. Michael Ben-Ari ran for Knesset unsuccessfully in the 2003 elections with the Herut – The National Movement party, and in the 2006 elections with the Jewish National Front party; both times, the parties failed to pass the threshold. Leading up to the 2009 elections, the Jewish National Front, headed by long-time Kach party activist Baruch Marzel, allied with Eretz Yisrael Shelanu, a new party founded by Chabad Rabbi Shalom Dov Wolpo. The joint list ran as part of the National Union, with Michael Ben-Ari, its representative, taking the fourth spot on the alliance's list. The National Union won four seats, allowing Ben-Ari to enter the Knesset.

The party was originally formed as Otzma LeYisrael (Hebrew: עָצְמָה לְיִשְׂרָאֵל; lit. 'Strength for Israel'), on 13 November 2012 by Eldad and Ben-Ari, who split from the National Union to form a new party ahead of the 2013 elections.

Eldad, a secular hard-liner, and Ben-Ari, an Orthodox Jew and former Kach activist, decided to form the new faction Otzma LeYisrael in October 2012, before the 2013 election, after months of infighting within the National Union, over if the party should hold primaries or not. Eldad was chosen to lead the party's list, followed by Ben-Ari and Marzel; the party was officially formed as a breakaway of the National Union on 13 November 2013. The party has affiliations with, and shared their office with, the anti-assimilation group Lehava, whose Director-General Bentzi Gopstein is a member of the party. The office of Lehava and Otzma Yehudit was raided in 2014. The party's anthem is the "Jingle of Otzma LeYisrael".

== Ideology ==
The party is considered to be Religious Zionist, Kahanist, ultra-nationalist, anti-Arab, and far-right, and has also been described as racist, though the party disputes this. Various sources, including the Israeli sociologist Eva Illouz, have described the party as a Jewish supremacist and Jewish fascist group. Otzma Yehudit calls for a one-state solution, including the annexation of the West Bank and complete Israeli rule of the land between the Jordan River and the Mediterranean Sea. The party is against the formation of a Palestinian state, and advocates cancellation of the Oslo Accords, as well as for imposing Israeli sovereignty over the Temple Mount.

The party advocates for increased emphasis on the teaching of Jewish history in all elementary schools to "deepen Jewish identity in students". The party is against "freezing construction of Jewish settlements, releasing terrorists, or negotiating with the PA". The party advocates deportation of "Arab extremists". On 24 February 2019, party member Itamar Ben Gvir called for the expulsion of Arab citizens of Israel who are not loyal to Israel. In 2022, current leader Ben-Gvir endorsed deporting the Joint List chairman Ayman Odeh, as well as the anti-Zionist Neturei Karta sect, "on a train." As part of his 2022 campaign he also advocated for giving full immunity to soldiers. While his party advocates for deportations, Ben-Gvir stated he was wrong when he held the position in his youth that all Arabs should be expelled.

The party advocates what it calls "Jewish capitalism" as its economic system, and claims that its approach would save "billions of shekels from the reduction of the defense budget following the removal of the enemy", which would be directed at infrastructure development, reducing bureaucracy and regulations, as well as allocating resources to strengthen "weak populations". The party also supports aiding the elderly and disabled. The party is also opposed to abortion. The party supports easing restrictions on the IDFs rules of engagement. As part of a political merger with The Jewish Home, the party pledged to oppose price tag attacks.

== History ==
=== 2012-2013 ===
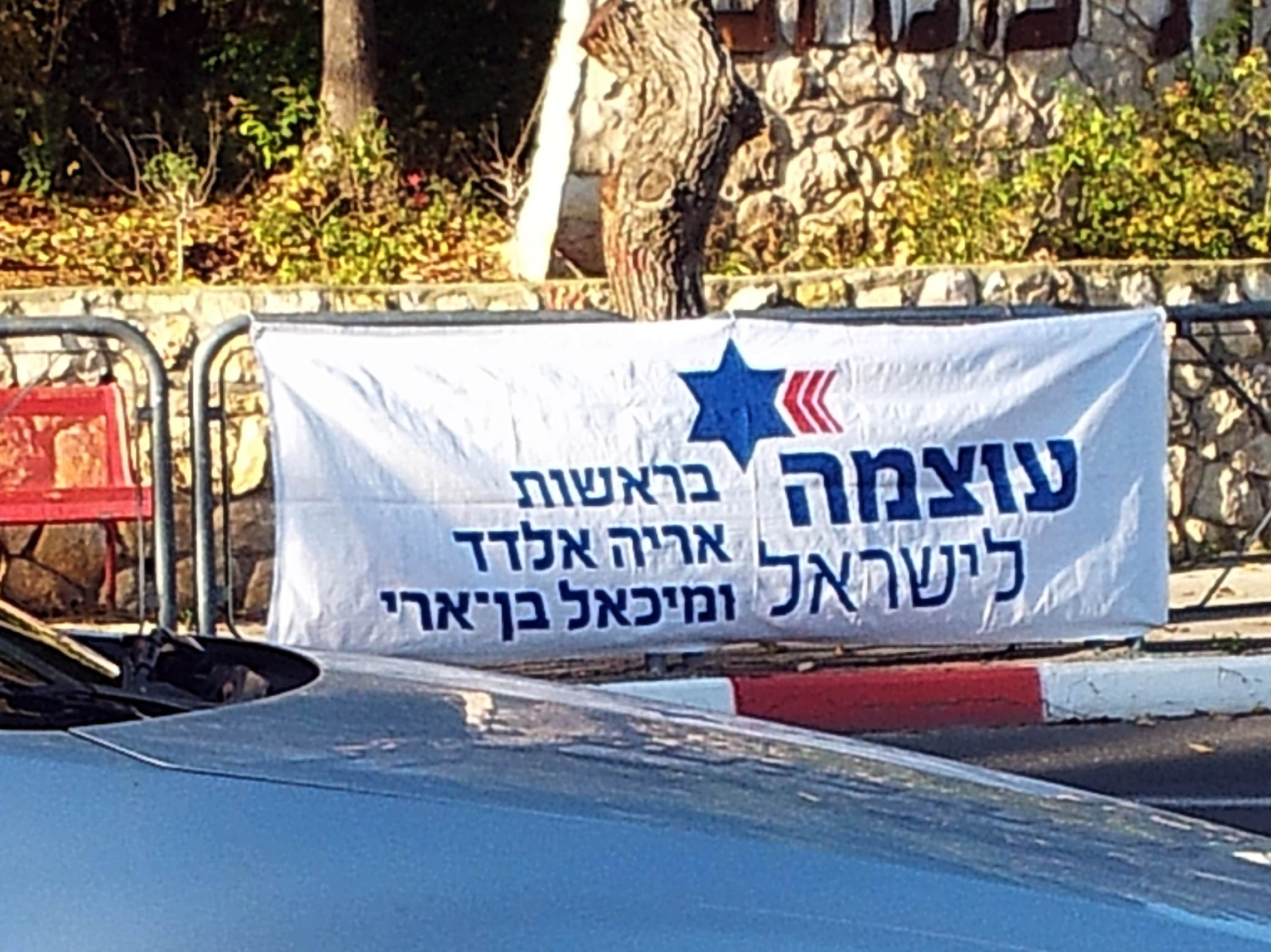
Otzma LeYisrael campaign banner for the 2013 elections.

In November 2012, Michael Ben-Ari announced the campaign slogan for the 2013 elections: "There are no rights without duties". The party failed to pass the election threshold.

=== 2014-2015 ===
In 2014, police raided the offices of Otzma Yehudit, due to the offices being shared with the organization Lehava.

This was also the year that the party announced they would be participating in the 2015 election; they announced that their slogan would be: "Those on the right vote Otzma Yehudit! Autonomy? Two states? There's Meretz for that. One state – Otzma Yehudit!"

In 2015, the party chose to contest the 2015 Knesset election as part of a joint list with Yachad; Baruch Marzel was the only candidate from the party to run on the list. There was a conflict during the negotiations between the parties due to Yachad being worried that if the parties ran on a list together, and failed to pass the threshold, it would put the right-wing coalition at risk. It was speculated before the election that the joint list would win as many as five seats in the Knesset. Though in the election, Yachad only won 125,106 votes (2.97%) votes, falling short of the 3.25% threshold needed for winning seats in the Knesset. Members of the ultra-Orthodox Shas party were accused of tampering with the ballots of Yachad, as well as creating a straw party with the election symbol of Otzma Yehudit to trick Yachad voters. After the elections, the party announced that they were planning on establishing an alternative media source. Michael Ben-Ari also said that the party was unsure if it planned on competing in other elections, instead hoping to focus on extra-parliamentary activism.

=== 2016 ===
In June 2016, Otzma Yehudit organized a march from 'Ara to Ar'ara. The march started in Ara due to it being the village which Nashat Melhem was from, who was a terrorist responsible for an attack in Tel Aviv. The application for the march was originally denied; however, after an appeal to the Supreme Court, the march was allowed to go on, though they had to respect the conditions set by the police.

=== 2017 ===
On 19 July 2017, the party requested a permit from police to organize a march in Umm al-Fahm. On 21 July, the party distributed food to security forces in Jerusalem. On 23 July, dozens of party members demonstrated outside of the Prime Minister's Office in Jerusalem in the evening; the demonstrators called upon Defense Minister Avigdor Lieberman to resign. On the evening of 24 July, their party blockaded a junction just outside Nablus, preventing both the entry and exit of Palestinians. On 24 September, the party's planned conference in Lod was cancelled by orders of the Lod City Hall; it was instead held in Gandhi Garden. After it was rescheduled, the party's leader, Michael Ben-Ari, released a video calling for Arabs to leave Israel and move to Arab countries. The conference was condemned by the Coalition Against Racism in Israel. On 1 November, the party put up billboards for the memorial of Meir Kahane, though the billboards were taken down after pressure from left-wing lawmakers, as well as NGOs. On 4 December, in protest of stone-throwing by Arabs against a group of Jewish children on a hike, activists from the party announced that they would hike to the same cave that the children went to. They were stoned by Arabs as well.

=== 2018-2019 ===
In January 2018, Baruch Marzel and Michael Ben-Ari distributed Tigrinya-language flyers in Tel Aviv inviting refugees to the houses of Meretz MKs and left-wing activists. On 9 April 2018, it was reported that the police withdrew their permit for them to demonstrate in Umm al-Fahm; however, under the Eldad Yaniv precedent, they would continue with their protest which was planned a year earlier without police permission. The protest occurred on 10 April, with dozens of activists attending; however, the police blocked the party from entering the city, although Public Security Minister Gilad Erdan said that they were allowed to earlier that morning. Party leaders Michael Ben Ari, Baruch Marzel, Zvi Sukkot, and Itamar Ben Gvir were arrested en route. The protest included Lehava leader Gopstein. On 6 August, the party received permission to march in Umm al-Fahm after petitioning the Supreme Court. The march occurred without incident on 9 August.

On 5 November 2018, the party announced it was running for the April 2019 Israeli legislative election. They also launched a crowd-funding page to fund their campaign. The funding campaign resulted in the party receiving NIS 820,000. After Naftali Bennett announced that he was leaving The Jewish Home party to form the New Right party, Otzma Yehudit called on Bezalel Smotrich and Eli Yishai to create an Orthodox-nationalist bloc for running in the 2019 elections.

Otzma Yehudit logo during 2019–2020 elections

In January 2019, the party entered talks with the Tkuma party in order to create an alliance. In February, Israeli prime minister Benjamin Netanyahu reached out to Otzma Yehudit in an attempt to try and get the party to run on a list with Tkuma and The Jewish Home, leading to criticism from opposition Knesset members. The chairman of Tkuma, Bezalel Smotrich, responded by saying that the Likud should merge with Otzma Yehudit. Negotiations for a joint list with Tkuma ended on 11 February 2019, and Otzma Yehudit indicated it would run with another party instead. On 20 February 2019, Otzma Yehudit and The Jewish Home reached a deal that would give Otzma Yehudit the 5th and 8th seats in a technical bloc. On 21 February 2019, the party announced that their candidates for the list would be Michael Ben-Ari and Itamar Ben-Gvir. On 17 March 2019, Ben-Ari was banned from running for the Knesset ahead of the April 2019 Israeli legislative election. In response, Ben-Ari stated: "We will win. This is not the end... We will put an end to the judicial junta."

Netanyahu's role in brokering the deal with Jewish Home was widely condemned; American Israel Public Affairs Committee (AIPAC) and the American Jewish Committee preemptively announced that even if Otzma Yehudit entered the government, they would not meet with them. The former noted in a tweet that "AIPAC has a long-standing policy not to meet with members of this racist and reprehensible party". On 25 June 2019, Otzma Yehudit split from the Union of Right-Wing Parties. Ben-Gvir was expected to enter the government after Netanyahu had agreed to pass a form of the Norwegian law, though Netanyahu's failure to form a government, and Peretz' refusal to resign his Knesset seat, made it impossible. Subsequently, it was reported that the party had discussed alliances for the September 2019 elections with former Likud MK Oren Hazan, Zehut leader Moshe Feiglin, and New Right leader Ayelet Shaked. Despite initially partnering with the Noam party, the two parties split over Otzma's insistence on fielding a secular candidate, and Otzma chose to run independently.

On 21 August 2019, Otzma Yehudit and Likud submitted an ultimately unsuccessful petition to the Supreme Court requesting that the Joint List be banned from contesting the September 2019 elections. On 25 August 2019, the Supreme Court ruled that Otzma Yehudit candidates Baruch Marzel and Gopstein were banned from running in the September 2019 elections. On 26 August 2019, Likud representative Natan Eshel met with Ben-Gvir to urge Otzma Yehudit to drop out of the race. However, Ben-Gvir subsequently claimed that he had requested the meeting to enlist Likud's assistance for the Otzma campaign, on the grounds that Netanyahu would be unable to command a Knesset majority unless Otzma passed the electoral threshold. Otzma did not pass the electoral threshold, winning 1.88% of the vote. On 20 December 2019, Otzma Yehudit and the Jewish Home party agreed to run on a joint list called the United Jewish Home ahead of the 2020 Israeli legislative election. On 15 January 2020, the New Right, Tkuma and the Jewish Home reformed Yamina, leaving Otzma outside of the list. The party failed to cross the threshold.

=== 2021 ===
On 31 January 2021, Otzma Yehudit formed a joint list with Noam ahead of the 2021 Israeli legislative election. Ben-Gvir and Noam head Avi Maoz urged The Jewish Home and the Religious Zionist Party to also unite with Otzma Yehudit. The Religious Zionist Party subsequently did so on 3 February.

=== 2022 ===
Ahead of the 2022 election, with Otzma rising in polls, they sought to increase their representation within the Religious Zionist Party list. However, Smotrich denied their candidate the seventh spot on the list, spurring Ben-Gvir to announce a solo run. Opposition leader Benjamin Netanyahu publicly encouraged the list to reunite to avoid losing right-wing votes to the threshold. Following the initial split, Otzma had been polling higher than the Religious Zionist party; after Netanyahu called for a reunification of the list, Otzma publicly offered a rotating list with Smotrich as the leader, and every other seat going to Otzma. The party also hired a political campaigning firm named "C.I.Y Global", which was founded by former Mossad chief Danny Yatom, to help with its election campaign. Otzma Yehudit and the Religious Zionist Party reunited and also included a candidate from Noam in a last minute move before the deadline for list submissions. The party won six seats, while the broader joint list won 14 seats in total.

Otzma Yehudit was the first party to sign a coalition agreement with Likud on 25 November following the 2022 Israeli legislative election.

=== 2025 ===
Party ballot slip for the 2026 elections

The party left the government in January 2025 after a ceasefire was reached during the Gaza war, though MK Almog Cohen did not resign from his position. The rest of the party rejoined the government in March 2025.

=== 2026 ===
Party head Ben-Gvir stated in July 2026 that Otzma Yehudit would not ally with the Religious Zionist Party again, ahead of the 2026 Israeli legislative election. Two members of the party, Yitzhak Wasserlauf and Yitzhak Kroizer, used Eretz Yisrael Shelanu as a shelf party to acquire additional funding units. The party won seven seats in the election.

== Controversies ==
In December 2012, Otzma LeYisrael ran an ad campaign on billboards and bus advertisements that included words in Arabic such as "equality" and "taxes". One of the signs was banned by the Israeli Central Elections Committee on the ground that the ad was seen as racist. The ad shows the Arabic word "loyalty" with the Hebrew caption "Because without duties, there are no rights". This ban was later reversed by the Supreme Court of Israel. Aryeh King, a Ma'ale HaZeitim resident, ran as number four on the party list for the 2013 Knesset elections. Later that year, he was elected into the Jerusalem municipal council, where he became Chairman of the Environment Committee, Deputy Chairperson of the Emergency and Security Committee, and a council member on the Regional Planning and Building Committee. While holding these positions, in January 2014, he distributed thousands of flyers to the Arab residents of Jerusalem asking them to leave the Land of Israel in exchange for a negotiated amount, due to the Jewish rights to the land, as written down in the Torah and acknowledged in the Koran. In the 2018 municipal elections, King's United party again won two seats in the Jerusalem Municipality. On 5 November 2023, Otzma Yehudit government minister Amihai Eliyahu was suspended from the Israeli cabinet for claiming that the use of nuclear weapons was "one of the possibilities" when discussing Israel's options in its ongoing military action in the Gaza Strip.

In June 2026, the Israeli Ministerial Committee for Legislation approved a bill proposed by Zvika Fogel of the Otzma Yehudit party and supported by National Security Minister Itamar Ben-Gvir concerning the Muslim call to prayer. The bill would impose new restrictions on the use of mosque loudspeakers. According to reports, the proposal was intended to restrict the broadcast of the adhan in East Jerusalem. Under the bill, mosques would be required to obtain prior authorization before installing or operating loudspeaker systems, with permits assessed on the basis of factors including sound levels, noise-reduction measures, proximity to residential areas, and the impact on nearby residents. The proposal would also authorize police officers to order the immediate cessation of broadcasts in cases of alleged violations, while continued violations could result in the confiscation of loudspeakers and the imposition of fines. The bill remained subject to approval by the Knesset.

== Ein L'zion Project ==
On 14 January 2018, the party announced its plan to catch individuals throwing rocks at Jews in the West Bank, and to seek prosecution of the rock-throwers after submitting evidence to the police. The party planned to film evidence through the use of drones piloted by trained volunteers. Training volunteers, and buying the drones, was paid via a successful crowdfunding campaign. On 31 January 2018, the party succeed in recording rock-throwers attacking Jewish youth who were planting trees at a Tu Bishvat festival.

On 1 February 2019, during a stone-throwing incident outside the Adei Ad settlement during the unrest following a death in the village of al-Mughayyir the previous week, "over a hundred residents" of the village were photographed by an Otzma Yehudit photographer as part of the project, with the intention of handing it over to the IDF and the police, alongside an appeal to "liquidate the terrorist nest" of the neighboring village.

== Leaders ==
Leader	Took office	Left office
Aryeh Eldad	2012	2013
Michael Ben-Ari	2013	2019
Itamar Ben-Gvir	2019	Incumbent

== Election results ==
=== Knesset ===
Election	Leader	Votes	%	Seats	+/–	Status
2013	Aryeh Eldad	64,782	1.76	0 / 120	▼2	Extra-parliamentary
2015	Michael Ben-Ari	part of Yachad (Note: Received 125,158 or 2.97%)		0 / 120	–	Extra-parliamentary
Apr 2019	Michael Ben-Ari	part of URWP (Note: Received 159,468 or 3.70%)		0 / 120	–	Extra-parliamentary
Sep 2019	Itamar Ben-Gvir	83,609	1.88	0 / 120	–	Extra-parliamentary
2020	Itamar Ben-Gvir	19,402	0.42	0 / 120	–	Extra-parliamentary
2021	Itamar Ben-Gvir	with RZP (Note: Received 225,641 or 5.12%)		1 / 120	▲1	Opposition
2022	Itamar Ben-Gvir	with RZP (Note: Received 516,470 or 10.84%)		6 / 120	▲5	Coalition (2022 – Jan 2025)
2022	Itamar Ben-Gvir	with RZP		6 / 120	▲5	Support (Jan 2025 – Mar 2025)
2022	Itamar Ben-Gvir	with RZP		6 / 120	▲5	Coalition (Mar 2025 – 2026)
2026	Itamar Ben-Gvir	326,793	5.74	7 / 120	▲1	TBA

== Knesset members ==
Knesset	Members	Notes
18th	Aryeh Eldad, Michael Ben-Ari	Party breaks away from the National Union in 2012
24th	Itamar Ben-Gvir	Serving under the Religious Zionist Party
25th	Itamar Ben-Gvir, Yitzhak Wasserlauf, Almog Cohen (replaced by RZP MK Zvi Sukkot on 6 April 2025), Amihai Eliyahu (replaced by Yitzhak Kroizer on 1 January 2023), Zvika Fogel, Limor Son Har-Melech	Serving under the Religious Zionist Party (until 20 November 2022)
26th	Itamar Ben-Gvir, Tally Gotliv, Yitzhak Wasserlauf, Amihai Eliyahu, Limor Son Har-Melech, Yitzhak Kroizer, Hanamel Dorfman	
