= Jewish National Front =

Far-right political party in Israel

Jewish National Front חזית יהודית לאומית
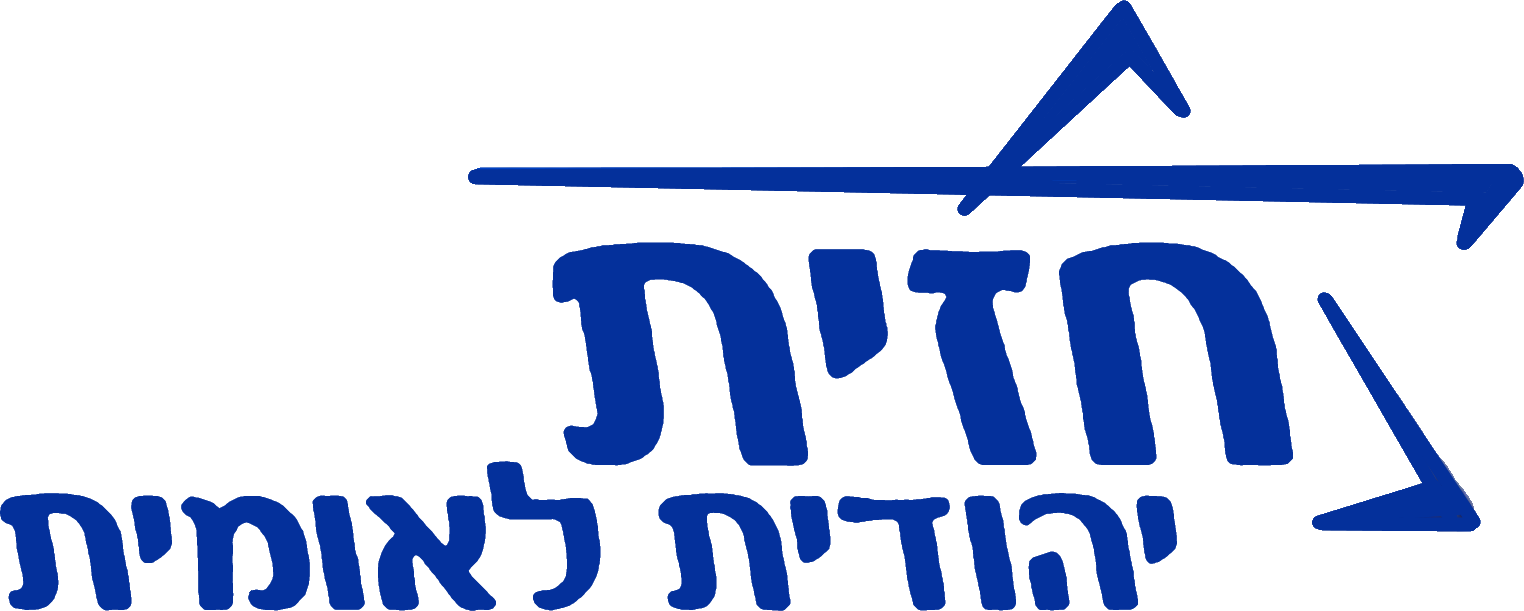
- Founder: Baruch Marzel
- Founded: January 2004
- Dissolved: 2012
- Split from: Herut – The National Movement
- Merged into: Otzma LeYisrael
- Ideology: Religious Zionism; Religious conservatism Social conservatism Ultraconservatism; Ultranationalism; Kahanism; Halachic state One-state solution
- Political position: Far-right
- National affiliation: National Union (2008–2012); Eretz Yisrael Shelanu (2008–2012)
- Most MKs: 1 (2009–2013)
- Fewest MKs: 1 (2009–2013)

Election symbol
- כ

Website
- www.hazit.co.il

The Jewish National Front (Hebrew: חֲזִית יְהוּדִית לְאוּמִּית, Hazit Yehudit Le'umit), commonly known in Israel by its Hebrew abbreviation Hayil (חי״ל), was a religious far-right political party in Israel.

== History ==
The party was founded in January 2004 by Baruch Marzel. The party ran in the 2006 elections to the Knesset on a joint list with Professor Paul Eidelberg's Yamin Yisrael party, but received less than the 2% minimum number of votes required to pass the threshold to receive representation.

Marzel was a senior activist for Kach, the most right-wing stream of religious nationalism in Israel, though Marzel was number two on Kleiner's Herut list for the 2003 Knesset elections.

In 2008, prior to the elections for the 18th Knesset, the party merged with Eretz Yisrael Shelanu, which, in turn, joined with the larger National Union party. Jewish National Front representative Michael Ben-Ari was given the fourth spot on the list, and subsequently won a seat in the 18th Knesset in 2009. This marked the first time the Jewish National Front had Knesset representation.

In 2012, the Otzma LeYisrael party used the Jewish National Front as a shelf party. As of 2026, Otzma Yehudit remains legally known by the name of the Jewish National Front.

== Position ==
The party called for a change in the country's electoral system so that Knesset members represent constituencies, rather than being elected on a party list system, as well as switching to a presidential system of government.

It also backed increasing Jewish immigration, limiting immigration of people who are not Jews according to Halakha, and strengthening Jewish education in public schools, and opposed a Palestinian state, citing the stance of Rabbi Chaim Zimmerman, who wrote a halakhic discourse entitled "The Prohibition of Abandoning Land in Eretz Yisrael".

== Election results ==
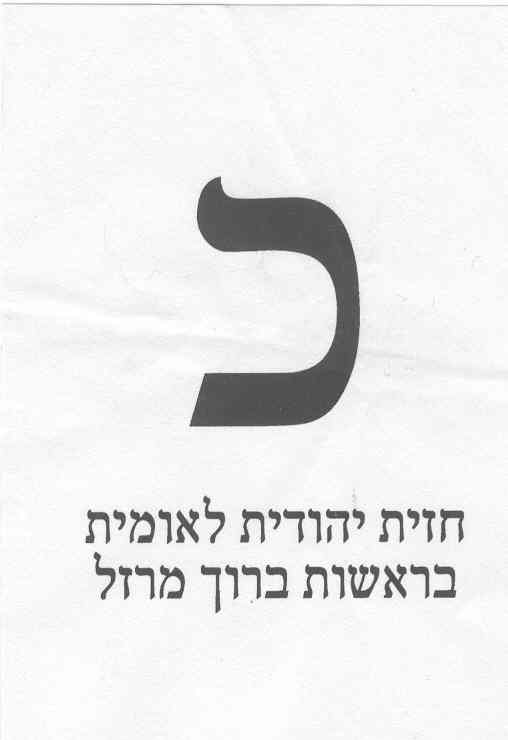
Party ballot for the 2006 election

Election	Leader	Votes	%	Seats	+/–
2006	Baruch Marzel	24,824	0.8	0 / 120	New
2009	Baruch Marzel	Part of the National Union (Note: received 112,570 or 3.34%)		1 / 120	▲1

== See also ==
- Neo-Zionism
- Kach
- Kahanism
- Otzma Yehudit
- Temple Institute
