= Eretz Yisrael Shelanu =

Eretz Yisrael Shelanu ארץ ישראל שלנו
- Leader: Shalom Dov Wolpo
- Founded: 11 November 2008
- Dissolved: 2013 (de facto)
- Ideology: Kahanism; Religious Zionism; Religious conservatism Social conservatism Ultranationalism
- Political position: Far-right
- Alliance: National Union (2009–2013)
- Most MKs: 1 (2009–2012)

Election symbol
- קי

Website
- www.sos-israel.com

Eretz Yisrael Shelanu (Hebrew: ארץ ישראל שלנו, lit. 'Land of Israel is Ours') is a far-right ultra-orthodox party in Israel. Founded by Chabad Rabbi Shalom Dov Wolpo and Baruch Marzel on 11 November 2008, it seeks a negation of a Palestinian state and an Israeli annexation of the West Bank.

== History ==
Logo used previously by the party

In 2008, in anticipation of the 2009 Knesset elections, Wolpe and his party merged with Baruch Marzel's Jewish National Front. The Knesset list was topped by Wolpe, Marzel, and Israeli musician Ariel Zilber. In the weeks prior to the election, the joint list agreed to run as part of the National Union list, with Michael Ben-Ari, its representative, taking the 4th spot on the alliance's list. The Union won four seats, allowing Ben-Ari to enter the Knesset.

On 27 October 2010, violence broke out at the town of Umm al-Fahm between Eretz Yisrael Shelanu marchers and Arab counter-protesters.

In 2012, Ben-Ari and Aryeh Eldad of Hatikva, another member party of the National Union, announced their decision to leave the alliance and form Otzma LeYisrael. Rabbi Michael Ben-Ari left Eretz Yisrael Shelanu, and formed Otzma Yehudit and leading up to the 2013 Knesset elections, party leader Rabbi Shalom Dov Wolpe announced his support of HaBayit HaYehudi. Subsequently, leading Haredi rabbis Ya'akov Yosef and David Meir Drukman announced cessation of support of Eretz Yisrael Shelanu.

In April 2019 Knesset elections, Rafi Levengrond - father of a murder victim in Barkan shooting terror attack Kim Levengrond-Yehezkel, used the party as a 'shelf party' to run his own list for the Knesset. In the September 2019 Knesset elections Avi Yalou used the party as a 'shelf party' to run for the Knesset with his own list called "Tsedek" ("Justice" in Hebrew). In the 2026 Knesset legislative election, Otzma Yehudit used the it as a shelf party to nominate Yitzhak Kroizer and Yitzhak Wasserlauf to gain more party funds.

== Leaders ==
Leader	Took office	Left office
Shalom Dov Wolpo	2008	2015

== Election results ==
Election	Leader	Votes	%	Seats	+/–	Status
2009	Shalom Dov Wolpo	Part of National Union		1 / 120	New	Opposition
2013	Shalom Dov Wolpo	Did not contest				Extraparliamentary
2015	Shalom Dov Wolpo	Did not contest				Extraparliamentary
April 2019	Rafi Levengrond	701 (#27)	0.02	0 / 120	0	Extraparliamentary
September 2019	Avi Yalou	3,053 (#14)	0.07	0 / 120	0	Extraparliamentary
