= Baruch Marzel =

Israeli religious and political extremist (born 1959)

- ברוך מרזל
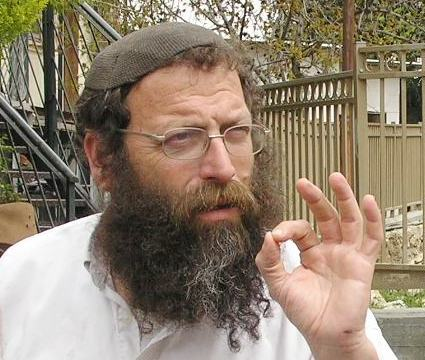
- Marzel in 2007
- Born: 23 April 1959 (age 67); Boston, Massachusetts, U.S.
- Citizenship: United States (renounced), Israel
- Known for: Kahanist activism
- Political party: Kach (formerly); Jewish National Front (2004–2012); Otzma Yehudit (2012–2022)

Baruch Meir Marzel (Hebrew: ברוך מאיר מרזל; born 23 April 1959) is an Israeli politician and activist. He is an Orthodox Jew originally from Boston who now lives in the Jewish community of Hebron in Tel Rumeida with his wife and nine children. He was the leader of the far-right-oriented Jewish National Front party. He was also a member of Otzma Yehudit, though he later left the party. He was the "right-hand man" of assassinated Rabbi Meir Kahane, acting as spokesman for the American-born rabbi's Kach organization for ten years. The mainstream Israeli press has described him as an "extreme right-wing activist".

== Biography ==
Marzel was born in 1959 in Boston, Massachusetts, and emigrated to Israel with his family when he was 6 weeks old, settling in Jerusalem's Bayit Vegan neighbourhood. Although his father Shlomo was a respected educator who did not deal much with politics, Baruch joined Kahane's Jewish Defense League at age 13. He gave up his US citizenship when he ran for the Knesset. He served in the IDF Armored Corps and fought in the 1982 Lebanon War, participating in battles along the Beirut-Damascus highway, after which he served in the United States as a representative for Sar-El. Marzel and his wife Sarah have nine children.

== Political activism ==
In 2004, he founded the Jewish National Front, and headed its Knesset list in the 2006 elections. During the election campaign, Marzel called on the Israeli military to "carry out a targeted killing against (left-wing figure) Uri Avnery and his leftist collaborators". This came in reaction to Avnery earlier saying on Israeli radio station Kol Israel that the assassination of Israeli tourism minister Rehavam Zeevi was a Palestinian "targeted killing", like the Israeli military's "targeted killings" of Palestinian political leaders. According to Gush Shalom, "the radio did not quote [Avnery's] next words: 'I am against all assassinations, both by Israelis and Palestinians.'"

Marzel was considered too far-right for Israel's hard-right parties, such as the National Union or the National Religious Party (today's HaBayit HaYehudi party). Ultimately, the Jewish National Front received 24,824 votes (0.79%), less than half the minimum 2% required to enter the Knesset.

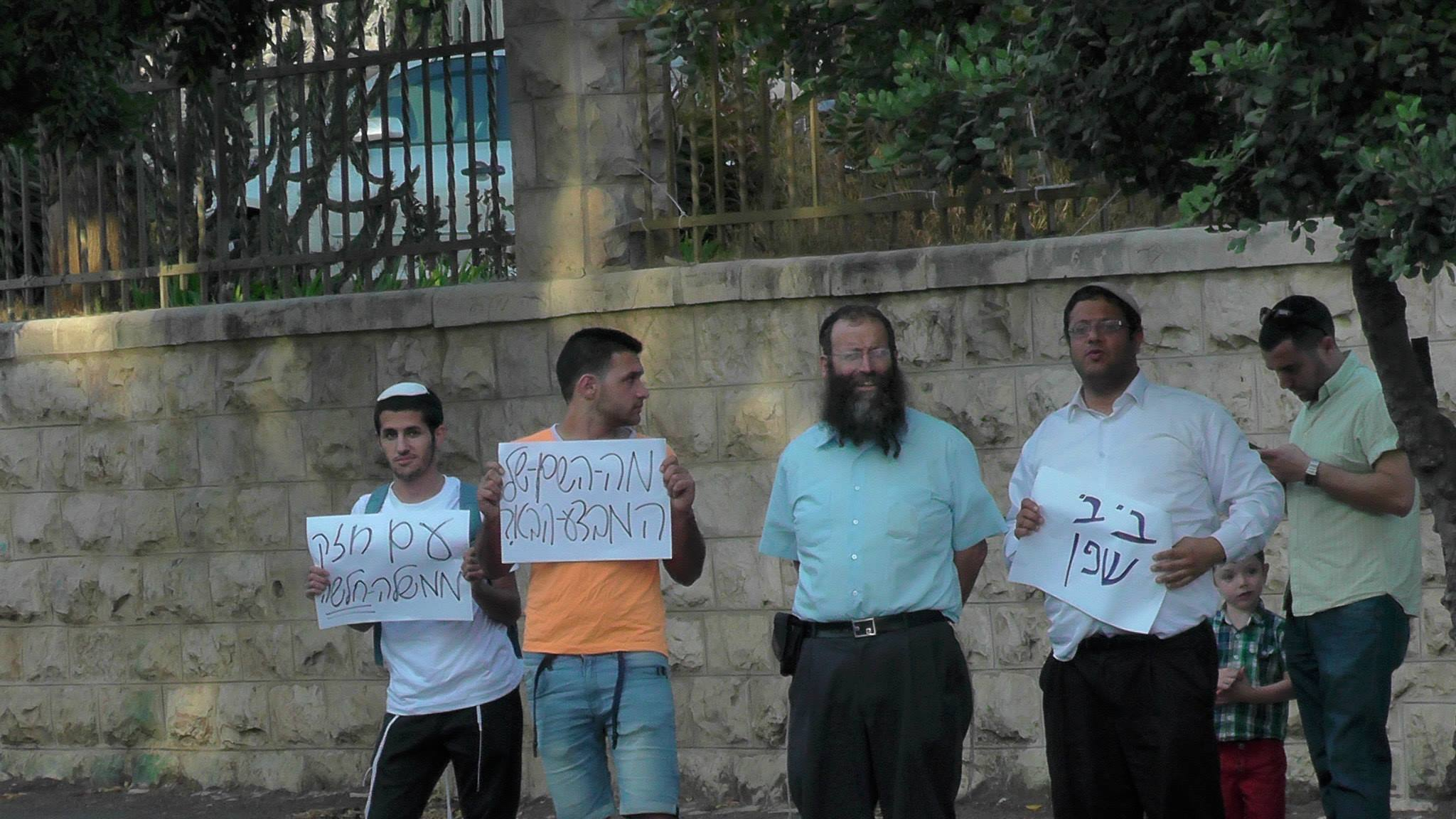
Marzel (center) with Itamar Ben Gvir (second from right) in Jerusalem at a protest against a ceasefire in the 2014 Gaza War.

In 2009, after fellow party member Michael Ben-Ari won a seat in Knesset on the National Union (Israel) list, Marzel agreed to serve as Ben-Ari's parliamentary aide. Marzel had originally planned to run independently. They eventually agreed not to submit their party's list on their own, and instead placed Ben-Ari on the National Union party list. In 2013, Marzel ran for the Knesset again, this time on the third slot of the newly founded Otzma LeYisrael party, which splintered from National Union. However, the party failed to cross the electoral threshold. Prior to the election, other right-wing parties, such as the Jewish Home party, had rejected including or co-operating with Marzel, considering him to be too outspoken and too far-right.

Prior to the 2015 Israeli election, Marzel was put 4th on the Yachad-Otzma Yehudit technical bloc. Marzel's inclusion came as a result of a compromise between the two parties, including the exclusion of Michael Ben-Ari and the inclusion of Marzel. In February 2015, the Election Committee disqualified Marzel, along with Arab MK Haneen Zoabi, from running in the election. The decision squeaked by with a 17 to 16 majority. The decision came after past attempts to block Marzel failed. The reasons given for the disqualification of Marzel were several statements attributed to him, which groups petitioning the move claimed qualified as "racism". Following Marzel's appeal, The Supreme Court accepted the appeals by both MK Haneen Zoabi and Marzel, against the decision of the Central Election Committee (CEC), which decided to disqualify them from participating in the next Knesset. In the end, the Yachad-Otzma bloc failed to pass the election threshold by a mere 11,000 votes, thus not entering the Knesset.

Marzel and Ben-Ari started the process in November 2022 of launching a new party that would be to the right of Otzma Yehudit.

He is a writer for the Israeli newspaper Arutz Sheva.

Ben-Ari and Marzel formed a new party, A Jewish Israel, Whole and Strong, in 2024, which the Registrar of Political Parties had rejected due to information provided by the Shin Bet; new Shin Bet head David Zini called in July 2026 for more time to "re-evaluate" the decision.

== Legal issues ==
Baruch Marzel was first arrested by police at age 14. His first conviction followed three years later. According to a 2003 report in the Israeli newspaper Yedioth Ahronoth, "Marzel had acquired a police record of some 40 files before he was 30". The report goes on to detail his criminal record, including assaults on Palestinians (one earning him a 12-month suspended prison sentence), an Israeli police officer, an Israeli left-wing activist, and the journalist Uri Avnery.

In August 2012, Israeli police arrested Baruch Marzel at the entrance to the town of Kiryat Arba over his failure to report for questioning. He was suspected of being involved in several incidents in Hebron that took place six months prior, in which several Palestinians allegedly were attacked.

In 2014, Yariv Oppenheimer, chairman of Peace Now, signed a police complaint against Marzel alleging threats against his life by his followers. On his Facebook page, Oppenheimer wrote that he is "exiting the police station now, worried and pessimistic. The telephone won't stop ringing, and on the other end, human scum who follow Marzel continue to curse and threaten."

In March 2015, six days before the 2015 legislative election, the Judea-Samaria District Police filed charges in the Jerusalem Magistrate's Court alleging that Marzel attacked a Palestinian Arab in 2013. According to the indictment, on 8 February 2013, Marzel entered the home of Hebron resident Issa Amro, as the activist was passing through to visit the Cave of the Patriarchs, and began attacking the Palestinian for "unknown reasons" after Amro demanded he leave. Marzel's attorney Itamar Ben-Gvir slammed the indictment, saying it "stinks of election tampering". This was echoed by Attorney General Yehuda Weinstein, who stepped in to demand an explanation as to why the indictment came two years after the incident. In February 2017, Marzel was arrested after clashing with police while protesting the demolition of Amona, a Jewish settlement in the West Bank.

== Controversies ==
=== Anti-LGBT activism ===
Marzel has in the past advocated violence towards homosexuals in Israel, calling for a religious war against them during a radio interview.[source needed] In 2006, in the days leading up to a planned gay pride parade in Jerusalem, Marzel reportedly stated that, "The stabbing incident during last year's parade will seem minor in comparison with what is anticipated this year. We have to declare a holy war."[no source] Marzel also was involved in the controversial March 2009 flag parade through Umm al-Fahm. He led protests against the eighth Jerusalem Gay Pride parade of 2010, opining that "[homosexuality] is a disease of choice, and a man can change his taste and his ways. When someone has AIDS, they tell them not to infect others, so why are these people allowed to march here in Jerusalem and infect us with their disease?"

During the 2012 Gay Pride march in Jerusalem, Marzel led a counter-demonstration in the ultra-Orthodox neighborhood of Mea Shearim. He brought with him to the demonstration three donkeys. Each of the donkeys bore a sign, one of which read "I'm proud too", a second one read "Proud Donkey", and the third one simply read "Pride March". Five years later, during the 2017 Jerusalem gay pride march, Marzel again led a counter-demonstration. Despite his previous rhetoric, Marzel stated that he did not protest against LGBT people on a personal level, saying: "I'm not fighting against these people personally, but against the parade and the phenomenon. [...] The nuclear family is a holy thing, and it's important to protect it."

=== Anti-assimilation activism ===
Marzel is seen as a central figure in the anti-assimilation Lehava group, along with Rabbi Ben-Zion Gopstein. In 2006, Marzel sent an open letter to Linor Abargil, asking her not to marry non-Jewish Lithuanian NBA player Šarūnas Jasikevičius. A similar open letter was addressed in March 2010 to Israeli model Bar Refaeli, urging her not to marry her non-Jewish boyfriend at that time, American actor Leonardo DiCaprio. Representing the Lehava organization, Marzel tried to convince Refaeli that her ancestors would have opposed such a marriage. In 2013, he was among 50 activists who held an anti-assimilation protest at a wedding between an Arab man and a Jewish woman. In July 2014, Facebook removed Marzel's page after readers complained about incitement.

=== Baruch Goldstein party ===
In 2000, Marzel organized a Purim party at the grave of Baruch Goldstein, the religious extremist who perpetrated the 1994 Cave of the Patriarchs massacre. Marzel was quoted as saying, "We decided to make a big party on the day he was murdered by Arabs."

== "The Radical Jew" ==
A short film about Baruch Marzel called The Radical Jew was the Winner of Best Short Documentary at the Charlotte Film Festival and the Golden Strands Award for outstanding short documentary at Tallgrass Film Festival.

== Sanctions ==
On 15 July 2024, the EU added Baruch Marzel to its list of sanctioned individuals for "openly calling for an ethnic cleansing of the Palestinians, together with Ben-Zion “Bentzi” Gopstein, founder and leader of the extremist organisation Lehava, and Isaschar Manne, founder of the unauthorised Manne Farm outpost in the South Hebron Hills.
