= National Union (Israel) =

Former political alliance of right-wing and nationalist parties in Israel

National Union האיחוד הלאומי
- Leader: Ya'akov Katz; Benny Begin; Rehavam Ze'evi; Binyamin Elon; Avigdor Lieberman
- Founded: 1999
- Dissolved: 2013
- Succeeded by: National Union-Tkuma
- Headquarters: Jerusalem
- Ideology: Nationalism; Neo-Zionism; National conservatism Right-wing populism
- Political position: Right Wing to Far-right
- Colours
- Most MKs: 7 (2003)

Election symbol
- ט (In 1999 יט; in 2003 ל)

Website
- www.leumi.org.il

The National Union (Hebrew: האיחוד הלאומי, HaIhud HaLeumi) was an alliance of right-wing and nationalist political parties in Israel. In its final full form, the alliance consisted of four parties: Moledet, Hatikva, Eretz Yisrael Shelanu, and Tkuma. Leading up to the 2013 Knesset elections, only Tkuma remained, and joined The Jewish Home. During its existence, it had also included Ahi, Herut – The National Movement, the Jewish National Front, and Yisrael Beiteinu.

== Background ==
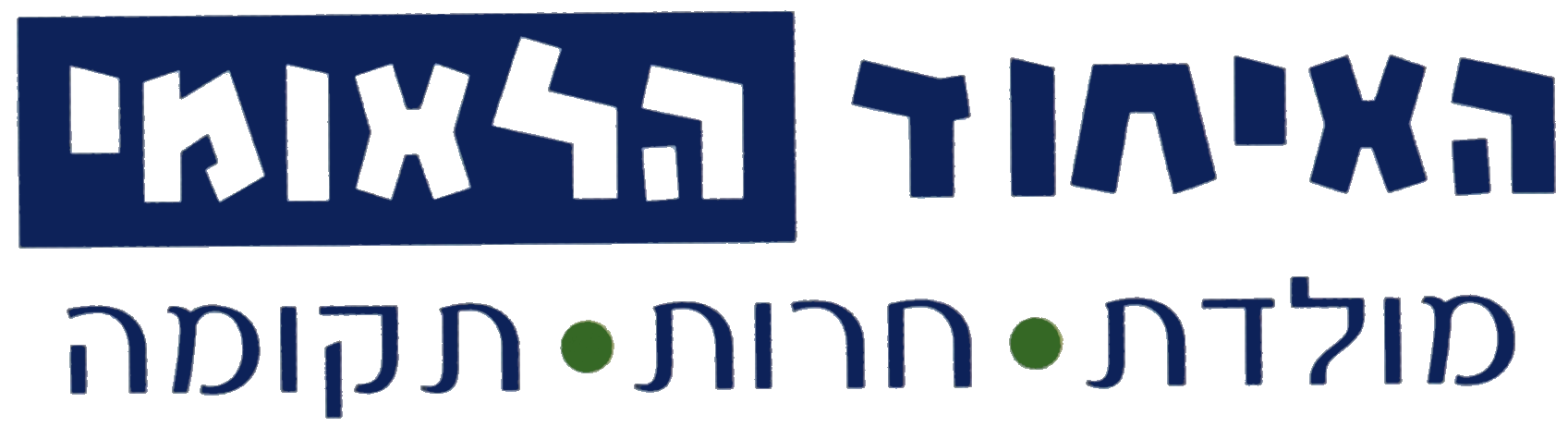
Logo of the National Union, 1999

The National Union was formed in 1999 to contest the elections of that year as an alliance between Moledet, Tkuma, and Herut – The National Movement, winning four seats. In 2001, the party's support was almost doubled by the addition of the predominantly Russian-immigrant party, Yisrael Beiteinu.

After Ariel Sharon won the 2001 Prime Ministerial elections, National Union was brought into the National Unity Government, and party leader Rehavam Zeevi was appointed Minister of Tourism, with Yisrael Beiteinu leader Avigdor Lieberman becoming Minister of National Infrastructure. When Zeevi was assassinated on 17 October 2001, Binyamin Elon of Moledet took his ministerial position, and Lieberman became head of the National Union.

Herut ran independently in the 2003 elections, and did not pass the barrier. The National Union party won seven seats, and was included in Ariel Sharon's coalition, alongside Likud, Shinui, the National Religious Party, and Yisrael BaAliyah. Elon and Lieberman were appointed Minister of Tourism and Minister of Transportation, respectively.

The National Union opposed the withdrawal from the Gaza Strip. Sharon sacked ministers Elon and Lieberman, and the National Union left the coalition (Elon attempted to avoid sacking by going into hiding, but ultimately failed).

However, the National Union was then bolstered by the addition of the Renewed Religious National Zionist Party (later renamed Ahi), which had been formed by NRP dissidents opposed to the Gaza withdrawal after the NRP had decided to remain in the coalition. After withdrawal, the National Union adopted orange as its symbol, the color having been used by anti-disengagement protesters.

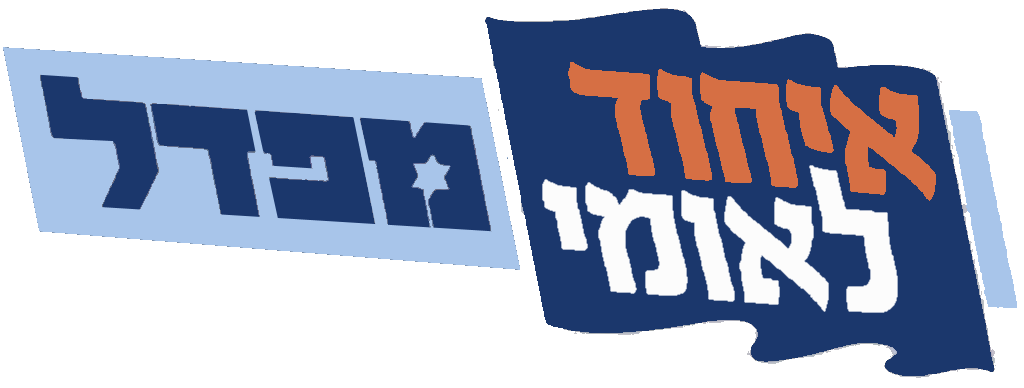
Logo of the National Union-NRP joint list, 2006

In 2005, Yisrael Beiteinu left the National Union to run independently in the 2006 elections. At the last minute, the National Religious Party decided to form a joint list with National Union called National Union - NRP. The combined list adopted more social policies, and won the support of the chief rabbis of Religious Zionism (such as Rabbi Abraham Shapira), and the Union of Handicapped (thanks to the NRP's pro-handicapped legislation). The joint list used the slogan New Right Rising (Hebrew: ימין חדש עולה, Yamin Hadash Oleh), and won nine seats, of which the National Union took six.

In 2008, in anticipation of the 2009 elections, the National Union and NRP formally unified into a single party, called the Jewish Home. This was intended to unify their political sector and present the public with a new face for the religious Zionist movement. The Jewish Home was to be a single party, rather than a list of separate parties, each with its own agenda and independent leadership. Professor Daniel Hershkowitz was picked to head the newly formed party. However, MK Aryeh Eldad left to form his own list, Hatikva, while MKs Effi Eitam and Yitzhak Levy (formerly of Ahi) re-established Ahi, which later merged into Likud. When the Jewish Home announced its candidate list for the elections, five of the top six slots went to ex-NRP members, with only MK Uri Ariel, formerly of Tkuma, in the top six.

The remaining ex-Moledet members broke off, re-established their party, and allied with MK Eldad's Hatikva, reviving the National Union name. Elon stated that he would not seek re-election, and American immigrant Uri Bank took his place on the Jewish Home list. The split from Jewish Home grew, and polls indicated Hatikva could win three seats. Eretz Yisrael Shelanu also joined the National Union, with member Michael Ben-Ari given fourth spot on the alliance's list. While these issues were being negotiated, Uri Ariel also left Jewish Home and rejoined the National Union list, leaving Jewish Home as little more than a renamed NRP.

In preparation for the 2013 Knesset elections, the Tkuma faction of the National Union merged with the Jewish Home. Ya'akov Katz, chairman of the party, asked to be lower on the list of Tkuma members, and soon after resigned from politics. Hatikva and Eretz Yisrael Shelanu broke off, and merged to form Otzma LeYisrael while Moledet and Tkuma merged with the Jewish Home. In the elections held on 22 January 2013, the Jewish Home received 9% of the vote, winning twelve seats in the Knesset.

== Controversy ==
National Union had come under scrutiny for its sympathy towards right-wing "price-tag" militants, who engaged in vandalist activities targeting both the state of Israel and Palestinians, including siding with such militants in clashes with Israeli authorities. When a group of "hilltop youth" militants attacked an Israeli army base in late 2011, MK Uri Ariel protested Israeli officials who called the group "terrorists", and condemned calls for the use of lethal force to repel such attacks in the future. In January 2012, Ariel admitted to giving IDF troop movement information to such militants in order to facilitate disruption of army activities.

In 2009, MK Michael Ben-Ari was arrested after interfering with police attempts to arrest a settler who had been rioting against Palestinians in protest of proposed settlement evacuations. In March 2011, Ben-Ari criticized arrests of settlers who had thrown stones at the police in order to block the service of an arrest warrant, comparing Internal Security Minister Yitzhak Aharonovitch to Muammar Gaddafi and declaring that "his days are numbered".

In 2012, MK Aryeh Eldad and MK Michael Ben-Ari sparked controversy by calling for asylum seekers entering Israel to be shot.

== Composition ==
Name	Ideology	Position	Leader
Moledet (1999–2013)	Ultranationalism; Population transfer	Far-right	Rehavam Ze'evi (1999–2001); Benny Elon (2001–08); Uri Bank (2008–13)
Tkuma (1999–2013)	Religious Zionism; Ultranationalism	Far-right	Zvi Hendel (1999–2009); Ya'akov Katz (2009–13)
Herut (1999–2000)	Revisionist Zionism	Right-wing	Benny Begin (1999–2000); Michael Kleiner (2000)
Yisrael Beiteinu (2001–2005)	Revisionist Zionism; Secularism	Right-wing	Avigdor Lieberman (2001–2005)
Mafdal (2006–2008)	Religious Zionism; Religious conservatism	Right-wing	Zvulun Orlev (2006–2008)
Ahi (2005–2008)	Religious Zionism; Religious conservatism	Right-wing	Effi Eitam (2005–2008)
Hatikva (2009–2012)	Revisionist Zionism; Ultranationalism	Far-right	Aryeh Eldad (2009–2012)
Eretz Yisrael Shelanu (2009–2013)	Religious Zionism; Ultranationalism	Far-right	Shalom Dov Wolpo (2009–2013)
Hayil (2009–2013)	Kahanism; Ultranationalism	Far-right	Baruch Marzel (2009–2012)

== Party leaders ==
	Leader	Took office	Left office
1	Benny Begin	1999	1999
2	Rehavam Ze'evi	1999	2001
3	Avigdor Lieberman	2001	2005
4	Benny Elon	2005	2008
5	Ya'akov Katz	2008	2013
6	Uri Ariel (Note: Tkuma is the only remaining faction in the National Union.)	2013	2019
7	Bezalel Smotrich	2019	Incumbent

== Election results ==
Election	Alliance	Leader	Votes	%	Seats	+/–	Status
1999	none	Benny Begin	100,181	3.0 (#11)	4 / 120	New	Opposition
2003	none	Avigdor Lieberman	173,973	5.52 (#5)	7 / 120	▲3	Government
2006	National Union-NRP	Benny Elon	224,083	7.14 (#9)	6 / 120	▼1	Opposition
2009	none	Yaakov Katz	112,570	3.34 (#8)	4 / 120	▼2	Opposition

== Knesset members ==
Knesset term	Seats	Faction	Members
15th (1999–2003)	2	Moledet	Binyamin Elon, Rehavam Ze'evi
15th (1999–2003)	1	Tkuma	Hanan Porat (replaced by Zvi Hendel)
15th (1999–2003)	1	Herut	Michael Kleiner
16th (2003–2006)	3+1	Yisrael Beiteinu	Avigdor Lieberman (replaced by Eliezer Cohen), Yuri Stern, Michael Nudelman; Yigal Yasinov (Note: MK Yasniov defected from Shinui and joined Yisrael Beiteinu during term)
16th (2003–2006)	2	Moledet	Binyamin Elon, Aryeh Eldad
16th (2003–2006)	2	Tkuma	Zvi Hendel, Uri Ariel
17th (2006–2009)	2	Moledet	Binyamin Elon, Aryeh Eldad
17th (2006–2009)	2	Tkuma	Zvi Hendel, Uri Ariel
17th (2006–2009)	2	Ahi	Effi Eitam, Yitzhak Levy
18th (2009–2013)	2	Tkuma	Ya'akov Katz, Uri Ariel
18th (2009–2013)	1	Hatikva	Aryeh Eldad
18th (2009–2013)	1	Eretz Yisrael Shelanu	Michael Ben-Ari
