= Michael Ben-Ari =

Israeli politician

- מיכאל בן ארי
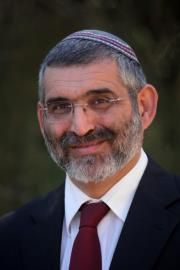
- Ben-Ari in 2011

Faction represented in the Knesset
- 2009–2012: National Union
- 2012–2013: Otzma LeYisrael

Personal details
- Born: 12 October 1963 (age 63) Tel Aviv, Israel
- Party: Zehut (since 2026)
- Other political affiliations: Kach (1981–1994); Herut (2003–2006); Jewish National Front (2006–2012); Otzma Yehudit (2012–2022)
- Spouse: Dganit Zmora
- Children: 9
- Education: Bar-Ilan University
- Occupation: Historian • Politician

Michael Ben-Ari (Hebrew: מִיכָאֵל בֵּן אֲרִי; born 12 October 1963) is an Israeli politician, and former member of the Knesset. During the 18th Knesset, Ben Ari was a member of the National Union party, until it broke up as elections for the 19th Knesset approached and he co-established the Otzma LeYisrael party. He failed to be re-elected to the 19th Knesset. He was banned by the courts from running in the 2019 election. He was the first outspoken disciple of Rabbi Meir Kahane to have been elected to the Knesset. He has a Ph.D in Land of Israel and Archaeology studies.

== Early life ==
Ben-Ari grew up in the Kfar Shalem neighbourhood in south Tel Aviv, born to Mizrahi Jewish parents from Iran and Afghanistan. He studied at the Bnei Akiva yeshiva at Kfar Haroeh, at the hesder yeshiva in Yamit, and at the Mercaz HaRav yeshiva. As part of his hesder army service, he was with the Nahal settlement at Neve Dekalim from 1982 to 1986. He studied education at Bar-Ilan University, gaining a BA, before studying the Talmud for a Master's degree, and the Land of Israel for a PhD. He was a rabbi teacher at the Darchei No'am Yeshiva in Petach Tikva as well as the Bnei Akiva Yeshiva in Giv'at Shmuel.

== Political career ==
Previously a member of the banned Kach party, Ben-Ari still views himself as Meir Kahane's follower. He ran with the Herut - The National Movement party in the 2003 elections, and for the 2006 elections, he ran with the Jewish National Front party, but both times failed to be elected since the parties did not pass the threshold. Leading up to the 2009 elections, the Jewish National Front joined a new party called Eretz Yisrael Shelanu. That new alliance then joined the National Union, and Ben-Ari was placed fourth on the combined list for the elections. He entered the Knesset as the party won four seats. Once elected, he appointed Hebron residents and Kahanists Baruch Marzel and Itamar Ben-Gvir as his aides in the Knesset.

In 2009, in an open letter to Israeli leaders and politicians, Ben-Ari stated that Pope Benedict XVI's visit to Israel would be an insult to the memory of Holocaust victims.

Unlike his teacher, Rabbi Meir Kahane, who was marginalized and isolated as a member of Knesset, Ben Ari has succeeded in integrating himself into Israel's political arena. According to Uri Avnery his extremist perorations are listened to with 'rapt attention' by most factions in the Knesset.

Ben-Ari's November 2009 United States visa application was denied on the grounds of his arrest during anti-disengagement protests in 2005 and his support for Kahanist ideology.

Ben-Ari opened his external Member of Knesset office in the south Tel Aviv neighbourhood where he grew up. Throughout the 18th Knesset session, he struggled to bring attention to the growing number of Sudanese he blamed for increasing crime rates and other residents' problems. In June 2011, to draw attention to what he saw as the ever-increasing illegal alien problem, he bused 40 Sudanese nationals to a prestigious pool in northern Tel Aviv, provided them with new bathing suits and paid for their entrance.

Ben-Ari's 2012 visa application to attend a conference in D.C. was denied on the State Department's "prerogative to ban terrorists from entering the country."

In July 2012, all Members of Knesset were sent a copy of the New Testament by a missionary organization. Ben Ari called it provocative, and subsequently tore his copy, referring to it as a despicable book responsible for the murder of millions of Jews, and which should, including the senders, be put in "history's trash can".

In November 2012, Ben-Ari and Aryeh Eldad left the National Union to establish Otzma LeYisrael. Ben-Ari and Eldad publicly burned Palestinian flags in response to the passage of United Nations General Assembly resolution 67/19. The party failed to cross the 2% threshold in the 2013 elections and Eldad subsequently lost his Knesset seat.

After an appeal by the Meretz party, the Supreme Court of Israel banned Ben-Ari from running in the April 2019 Israeli legislative election due to his extremist political views. He had been a candidate of the Otzma Yehudit party.

Ben-Ari and Marzel started the process in November 2022 to launch a new party that would be to the right of Otzma Yehudit. They formed a new party, A Jewish Israel, Whole and Strong, in 2024, which the Registrar of Political Parties had rejected due to information provided by the Shin Bet; new Shin Bet head David Zini called in July 2026 for more time to "re-evaluate" the decision.

Ben-Ari allied with Zehut in May 2026, ahead of the 2026 Israeli legislative election. Zehut instead agreed to run in September in a technical bloc with the Religious Zionist Party.

== Political arguments ==
In March 2010, in response to David Miliband's statement that the Israeli cloning of British passports is "intolerable", Aryeh Eldad commented: "I think the British are being hypocritical, and I do not wish to insult dogs here, since some dogs show true loyalty, [but] who gave the British the right to judge us on the war on terror?" The canine theme was taken up by Ben-Ari, who said: "Dogs are usually loyal, the British may be dogs, but they are not loyal to us. They seem to be loyal to the anti-Semitic establishment".

Ben-Ari argues that most Arabs should be expelled from Israel.

In May 2011, he equated 'leftists' with Hezbollah and Hamas, calling them "germs" and "enemies of Israel".

During a protest demanding the government escalate the assault on Gaza, he repeated "Let the IDF kick ass!", before complaining, "Why is it that after 200 assaults only 15 were killed? It should be 15 assaults and 2,000 killed!"

In 2012, Ben-Ari sparked controversy by calling for asylum seekers entering Israel to be shot.

In July 2014, during Operation Protective Edge, he was cited as having argued that: "Those who pity their enemies end up being cruel to their own people. Those who are cruel to their enemies truly love their own people."

== Legal issues ==
On 1 June 2009, Ben-Ari was handcuffed and arrested after being involved in an incident near Yitzhar in the West Bank despite his parliamentary immunity as Member of Knesset. He climbed onto an army truck and refused to get off, demanding that the Israel Border Police and Israel Defense Forces soldiers explain to him why they had arrested and handcuffed minors at a roadblocking protest. Knesset speaker Reuven Rivlin called the police commissioner and clarified that the police has no authority to arrest an MK without his approval. Yitzhak Aharonovich, the Internal Security Minister, justified the arrest, despite Ben Ari's parliamentary immunity, saying that he will not let MKs violate the law. Ben-Ari's response was to suggest that Aharonovich first verify the facts before coming to conclusions. The IDF Spokesman's office started an investigation into whether the IDF and Border Guard acted illegally in their treatment of Ben-Ari. On 16 June, the Knesset Committee discussed Ben-Ari's arrest. While the semantics of the word 'arrest' were discussed, it was confirmed that Ben-Ari was not incarcerated. It was reported that a letter from the Chief of General Staff's office stated that the IDF expects elected officials and public representatives not to fan the flames and to abide by instructions from the security forces. Chairman of the committee, Ze'ev Elkin from Likud, criticized the Ministry of Defense for boycotting the meeting and not sending representatives.

In 2024, he was indicted for incitement to racism against Arabs.

== Personal life ==
Ben-Ari lives in the Israeli settlement of Karnei Shomron. He is married with nine children. His brother, Herzl Ben-Ari, is the former head of the Karnei Shomron Local Council.

Party political offices
| Preceded by Position established | Leader of Otzma Yehudit; 2012–present | Incumbent |
