= Mordechai Elon =

Israeli Religious Zionist rabbi

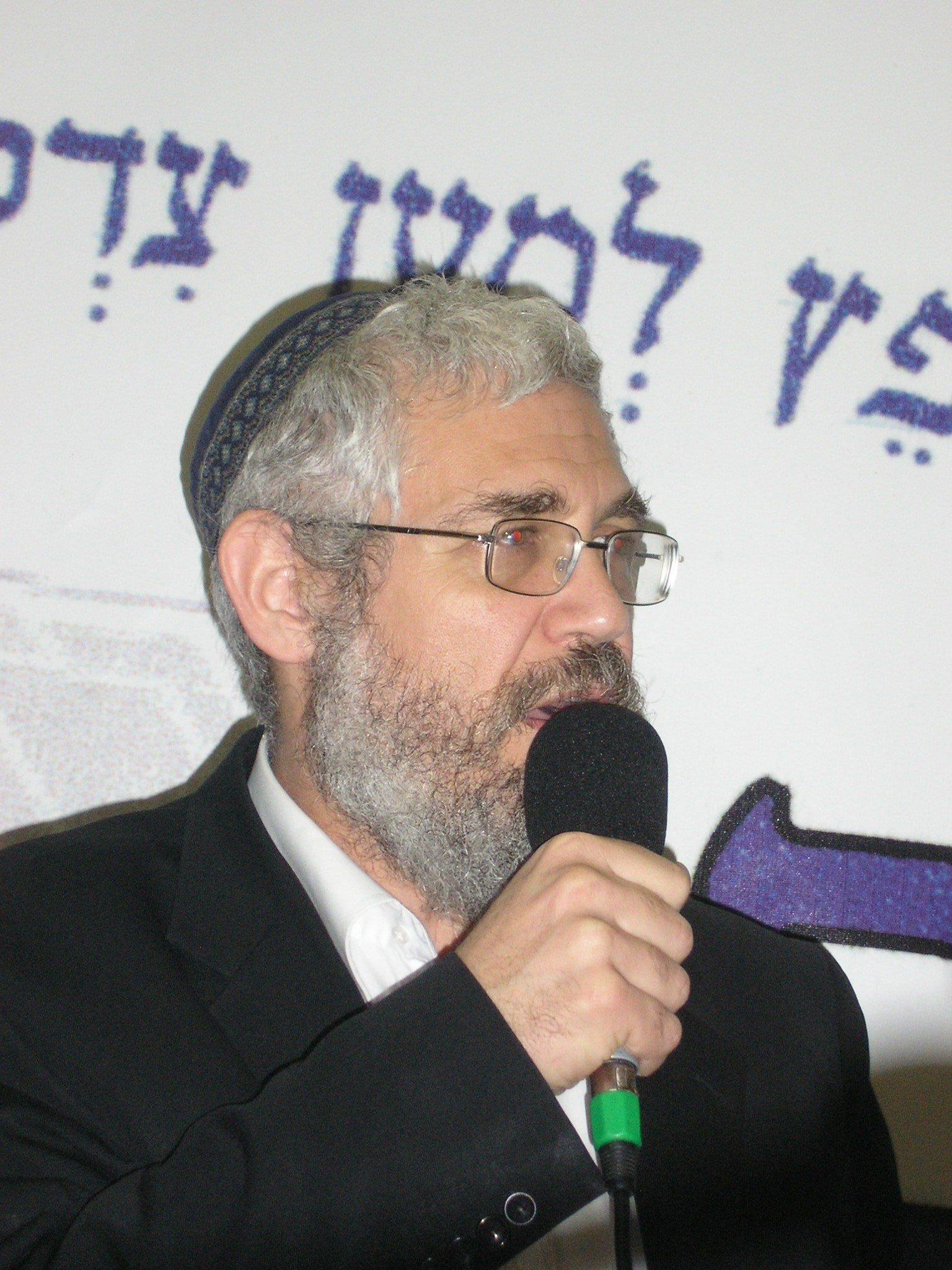
Mordechai Elon

Mordechai (Moti) Elon (Hebrew: מרדכי (מוטי) אֵלון; born 9 December 1959) is an Israeli Religious Zionist rabbi. He has headed several Orthodox Jewish social organizations and institutions, most notably as Rosh Yeshiva of Yeshivat HaKotel in the Jewish Quarter of Jerusalem from 2002 to 2006. He has also hosted television and radio shows.

In 2010, Elon, an outspoken public opponent of homosexuality, was investigated for sexual misconduct as a result of revelations made by Takana, a religious forum dealing with allegations of sexual harassment in the Religious Zionist community. On 7 August 2013, he was convicted by the Jerusalem Magistrates Court on two counts of forcible sexual assault against a male minor. In addition, in December 2018 additional accusations of sexual misconduct on the part of Elon came to light.

== Life and career ==
Elon was born in Jerusalem, Israel, to Menachem Elon, a former Israel Supreme Court Justice, and Ruth, née Buchsbaum, one of five children. He received his high-school education at Yeshivat Yerushalayim LeTzeirim, and his higher education at the Hesder Yeshivas Or Etzion and Kiryat Shmona. In his twenties, he began teaching religious studies at the Horev Yeshiva High School in Jerusalem, and became its Rosh Yeshiva in 1987. He left Horev in 2002 to become the Rosh Yeshiva of Yeshivat HaKotel in the Jewish Quarter of Jerusalem, a post he left in 2006. After leaving, many of his students would continue to travel to visit him in Migdal, northern Israel.

Elon gave a weekly lecture on the Torah portion at the Yeshurun Synagogue in Jerusalem. Hundreds of people came to hear him, and the lectures were aired on a public Israeli radio station. He also hosted a weekly television show on the same topic, and led a bible group at the residence of the President of Israel.

Elon established and headed a Jewish socio-religious organization called "MiBereshit". The organization works with the Israeli Ministry of Education and Israeli schools in order to bring Jewish children and teens closer to their roots, and to the Land of Israel.

== Family ==
Elon is married, and has eleven children. After resigning from Yeshivat HaKotel, he went to live in Migdal, northern Israel. He is the brother of former Moledet Knesset Member and Minister of Tourism Benny Elon, Be'er Sheva District Court Judge Josef Elon, and writer and bible scholar Ari Elon.

== Sexual misconduct ==
In February 2010, Takana, a rabbinical forum set up to prevent sexual abuse in the national religious community, issued a statement claiming that it had received complaints against Elon dealing with allegations of "a long-term relationship that was clearly of a sexual nature" since shortly after its founding in 2003. During investigation, "the committee lost faith in statements by the rabbi, who concealed his acts during deliberation on the first complaint," according to the statement. A year later, Takana received "another complaint more severe than the first", which allegedly took place a year earlier, and was concealed by Elon in his talks with the forum. Coming to the conclusion that it was no longer fitting for him to work as a religious teacher or counselor, they asked him to leave his post as head of Yeshivat Hakotel, and cancel a number of public appearances and community roles. Takana claims that although at the time Elon agreed to their demands, namely leaving his position at Yeshivat Hakotel and moving to Migdal in northern Israel, he did not fulfill completely the obligations he agreed to, specifically the requirement to stay away from intimate, personal, and private meetings with people seeking his advice or religious counsel.

Takana had decided to go public with these allegations because they "had become increasingly concerned that [they] had no other way to protect the public from the possibility of more harm". Elon, however, publicly denied the allegations. In the aftermath, an associate of Elon reportedly threatened Takana forum member and Rosh Yeshiva of Yeshivat Har Etzion, Rav Aharon Lichtenstein, telling him that "he would hurt me in any way he could."

In August 2010, Attorney General Yehuda Weinstein instructed the police to conduct a criminal investigation of alleged sexual offenses committed against two minors. In January 2012, Elon asserted in his response to the courts that he often hugged or kissed students as a display of camaraderie, something common in certain segments of Israeli society. He said that in one instance, he attempted to console the accuser, who at the time had a parent die in a car accident, and that the action had been misinterpreted and blown out of proportion. Elon refused to enter into a plea bargain, and maintained his innocence.

In February 2013, the Jerusalem Magistrates Court dropped one of the charges following the refusal of a witness to testify. On 7 August 2013, Elon was convicted of sexually assaulting a male minor. In December 2013, Elon was given a 15-month suspended prison term, sentenced to six months of community service, and ordered to pay his victim 10,000 NIS ($2,850) in compensation. In February 2014, he decided not to appeal his guilty verdict.

In December 2018, it was reported that the Takana forum had received new complaints against Rabbi Elon about sexually inappropriate behaviour. A young man had turned to Elon for counsel, but their meetings had turned sexual in nature. The young man recorded some of their meetings and decided against filing a police complaint, instead taking the evidence to Takana. The Rabbis of Takana confronted Elon, who admitted to his actions, and agreed to stop all public activity to seek treatment.

== Writings ==
- Tekhelet Mordechai Sichot on the Weekly Torah Portion, Sifriyat Bet-El Publishing Ltd. OCLC 410733950
- The Tekhelet Mordekhai Haggadah, Sifriyat Bet-El Publishing Ltd., June 2007 ISBN 978-9650901943
