= Sprinzak =

Sprinzak, Shprinzak, Sprintzak, or Shprintzak (Hebrew: שפרינצק) is a Yiddish matronymic surname meaning "son of Shprintze". Notable people with the surname include:

- Ehud Sprinzak (1940-2002), Israeli professor of political science, founder and dean of the Lauder School of Government, Diplomacy and Strategy at the Interdisciplinary Center Herzliya, expert on terrorism
- Yair Sprinzak (1911-1999), Israeli scientist and politician
- Yosef Sprinzak (1885-1959), Zionist activist and Israeli politician, first Speaker of the Knesset, acting President of the State
