= JCW =

JCW may refer to:

- J. C. Williamson's, an Australian entertainment company
- Jewish Community Watch, an anti-child-abuse organization
- John Cooper Works, a British car marque
- Joint Committee on Women in the Mathematical Sciences; see women in mathematics in the United States
- Juggalo Championship Wrestling, an American professional wrestling promotion
- James C. Wright Middle School, a middle school in Madison, Wisconsin
