= Benjamin Shmueli =

Israeli jurist

- בנימין שמואלי
- Born: 1971 (age 54–55)
- Citizenship: Israel
- Occupations: Jurist, researcher, lecturer
- Title: Professor of Law

Academic background
- Education: Bar-Ilan University (1995–2005)

Academic work
- Discipline: Jurisprudence
- Sub-discipline: Family law, tort law, comparative law, Hebrew law
- Institutions: Bar-Ilan University

Benjamin Shmueli (Hebrew: בנימין שמואלי, romanized: Binyamin Shmueli; born 1971) is an Israeli jurist and researcher, who specializes in family law, tort law, comparative law and Hebrew law. He is a professor of law, and an associate professor at Bar-Ilan University in Ramat Gan.

== Biography ==
Shmueli completed his bachelor's degree along with a master's degree at Bar-Ilan University in 1998, as part of a special program for distinguished students. He received his doctorate there in 2005, while being an adjunct professor of law in Tel Aviv University, Netanya Academic College and Ono Academic College from 1998 to 2010. in 1999 he became a lawyer.

Between 2001 and 2005 he worked as instruction advisor in the Israeli Intelligence Corps. Between 2004 and 2010 he worked in various positions at Sha'arei Mishpat College in Hod HaSharon, such as academic advisor, clinic administrator, faculty member, and administrator of the college's child and family rights center. Between 2006 and 2008 he was a visiting professor at the Duke University School of Law in the United States, and taught tort and family law courses. He also was a senior research scholar at Yale University intermittently between 2013 and 2019.

In 2010 he joined the Bar-Ilan University Faculty of Law as a senior professor, and was appointed an associate professor in 2016.

In 2016 he published the book Maimonides and Contemporary Tort Theory: Law, Religion, Economics, and Morality together with Yuval Sinai, published by Cambridge University Press. The publication was funded by the Israel Science Foundation.

In October 2023 he was appointed as dean of students at the Bar-Ilan Faculty of Law.

In 2025 he published the book Children's Participation in Reality TV : Legal, Social, Ethics and Economic Aspects, published by Bar Ilan University Press and Nevo.

== Publications ==
- Shmueli, Benjamin (2025). זו המציאות, ילד! : השתתפות ילדים בתכניות מציאות (רֵאליטי): היבטים משפטיים, חברתיים, אתיים וכלכליים Zu haMetzi'ut, Yeled! Hishtatfut Yeladim beTokhniyot Metzi'ut (Reality): Heibetim Mishpatiyim, Hevratiyim, Etiyim veKhalkali'im [Children's Participation in Reality TV : Legal, Social, Ethics and Economic Aspects] (in Hebrew). Bar-Ilan University Press, Nevo.
- Sinai, Yuval; Shmueli, Benjamin (2020). Maimonides and Contemporary Tort Theory: Law, Religion, Economics, and Morality. Cambridge Studies in Law and Judaism. Cambridge: Cambridge University Press. doi:10.1017/9781316832042. ISBN 978-1-107-17929-5.
