= Elon Peace Plan =

2002 proposal in the Israeli-Palestinian conflict

The so-called Elon Peace Plan (also formerly "The Right Road to Peace"; now "The Israeli Initiative") is a plan to resolve the Israeli–Palestinian conflict through the principles of rehabilitation of Palestinian refugees, Israeli sovereignty over the occupied Palestinian territories (West Bank and, at the time, the Gaza Strip), and strategic cooperation with Jordan, based on Jordan becoming a Palestinian state.

== History ==
The plan was originally proposed in 2002 by Israeli tourism minister Rabbi Binyamin Elon. It advocates the formal annexation of West Bank and Gaza by Israel, the Palestinians becoming citizens of Jordan, which would become a Palestinian state, with their final status to be negotiated. The Palestinian refugee camps would be dismantled, and the Palestinian refugees would be fully absorbed into their host countries. Elon and Moledet (Elon's party and the chief supporter of this plan) proposed that "Israel, the United States and the international community will allocate resources for the completion of the exchange of populations that began in 1948 and the full rehabilitation of the refugees and their absorption and naturalization in various countries".

Elon continued to advance his plan, including a 2004 visit to Jordan for this purpose, but did not manage to win substantial support for it.

General public support for Elon and his plan in Israel can be gleaned from his party's election results: the National Union received 5.5% support on the Israeli legislative election of 2003 (which went up to 7.14% in the 2006 election after the party's merger with the National Religious Party).

The changing political climate in Israel following the 2006 Lebanon war and the Hamas takeover of the Gaza Strip prompted Elon to resume advancing his plan in 2007, complete with a million-dollar advertising campaign, as "The Israeli Initiative – The Right Road for Peace". Similar in principle to his original proposition, this new formulation gave up on the idea of a Palestinian state being formed in Jordan; while it still has Israel annexing the West Bank, it proposes that the Palestinians would become citizens of Jordan and residents of Israel rather than being re-located (though it also advocates providing them with a financial incentive to leave of their own accord). This idea directly opposes the direction taken by Prime Minister Ehud Olmert and the Kadima-Labor coalition, which aims to negotiate with the Palestinians with the ultimate goal of establishing a Palestinian state.

== Pro arguments ==
The case presented by proponents of the plan is that Israel, the Palestinians, Jordan and other moderate Arab states would all benefit from such a solution. Ideally, Israel could see a sharp drop in terrorist attacks and the dissipation of the demographic threat; Millions of Palestinians would turn from refugees to citizens and would be given new economical opportunities; and the abolition of the Palestinian state would prevent an extremist threat to the Hashemite Kingdom of Jordan, while international financial support and increased co-operation with Israel would provide financial growth and opportunities (which, to a lesser degree, applies to other Arab states as well). Republican US Senator and former presidential candidate Sam Brownback has expressed support of the plan.

== Counter arguments ==
In an essay titled "The Yamin [right-wing] Israel Plan", Prof. Paul Eidelberg wrote that "Even if [the Palestinians] were made Jordanian citizens, as proposed by the otherwise meritorious Elon Plan, it is wishful thinking to believe they will live in peace with the Jews in Judea, Samaria, and Gaza".

== See also ==
- Jordanian option
- Israeli–Palestinian peace process
- Projects working for peace among Israelis and Arabs
- List of Middle East peace proposals
- International law and the Arab–Israeli conflict
