= David Re'em =

Israeli politician (born 1953)

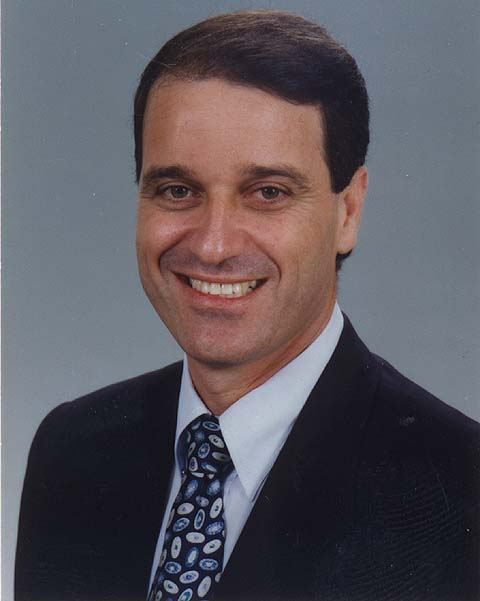
- Re'em in the 1990s

Faction represented in the Knesset
- 1996–1999: Likud
- 1999: Herut – The National Movement

Personal details
- Born: 28 March 1953 (age 73) Haifa, Israel

David Re'em (Hebrew: דוד ראם; born 28 March 1953) is an Israeli former politician who served as a member of the Knesset for Likud and Herut – The National Movement between 1996 and 1999.

== Biography ==
Born in Haifa, Re'em studied law for a year at university. He was a member of the board of directors at the Shikmona company and of the finance committee of the World Zionist Organization. He served two terms as mayor of Kiryat Ata starting in 1989 and was deputy chairman of the Local Government Association. Re'em has also served as chairman of the Association to Combat Drugs and the Association to Support the Elderly.

A member of the Likud secretariat and director of its Arab department, he was elected to the Knesset on the party's list in 1996, gaining the spot for members from Haifa. However, on 23 February, Re'em, Benny Begin and Michael Kleiner left Likud to establish Herut – The National Movement. He lost his seat in the May elections that year.

He ran for mayor of Kiryat Ata again in 2003 and 2008, but lost on both occasions.
