= Jewish Community Watch =

Organization dedicated to preventing child sexual abuse

Jewish Community Watch (JCW)
- Formation: 2011
- Founders: Meyer Seewald; Schneur Seewald
- Purpose: Prevention of child sex abuse
- Headquarters: Midtown Manhattan (formerly Crown Heights, Brooklyn)
- Location: Midtown Manhattan, Israel
- Official language: English
- CEO: Meyer Seewald
- Board of directors: Eli Nash; Meyer Seewald; Rabbi Yosef Blau; Chana Holtzberg
- Website: jewishcommunitywatch.org

The Jewish Community Watch is a global Jewish organization dedicated to the prevention of child sexual abuse (CSA) within the Orthodox Jewish community. Originally based in Crown Heights, Brooklyn, the organization has been noted for its controversial wall of shame, where it publicizes the names of people it considers suspected abusers by posting their names and alleged activities on the organization's website. The organization ceased day-to-day operations in 2014, but restarted operations several months later, restructuring with a new board of directors as well as an advisory board. Jewish Community Watch focuses on abuse prevention through education and awareness, as well as locating individuals thought to have abused children and warning the local community of their presence. The organization's founders are two residents of Crown Heights, Brooklyn, Meyer Seewald and his brother Schneur Seewald.

== Founding ==
The founder of JCW, Meyer Seewald, is a Crown Heights resident who, along with his brother Schneur Seewald, started the Jewish Community Watch in Crown Heights to investigate and expose orthodox Jewish community members suspected of child sexual abuse (CSA).

=== Personal life ===
Meyer Seewald was born in Crown Heights to Tzvi and Fayge Seewald, who became religious and belong to the Chabad-Lubavitch community in Crown Heights.

Seewald first became involved in anti-abuse work after two of his friends confided in him that they were abused by a local man who had organized youth programs in the community. Seewald later published his own recollections of being victimized at an overnight summer camp by his counselor.

In December 2015 Seewald became engaged to Raizel Kahn from Florida.

=== Awards and recognition ===
On December 12, 2012, Brooklyn District Attorney Charles Hynes presented an award of excellence to Seewald for "tireless service and dedication to the community" in exposing Jewish sexual predators.

== Activities and initiatives ==
=== "Wall of Shame" ===
Sharon Otterman and Ray Rivera, in The New York Times, stated that Jewish Community watch is one amongst several blogs and web sites publishing photos of people accused as molesters. They state that although this is a risky move legally - the sources believe it is justified by the need to warn the community, particularly given that the Brooklyn district attorney's office has a policy of not publicizing arrests or indictments in such cases.

Tablet magazine noted that Seewald claims to have a database of 225 suspected offenders. JCW's Wall of Shame posted 36 people accused of abuse. 21 of the 36 have been arrested and charged. According to Seewald, a person is added when the board has determined there is sufficient evidence. When a victim is unwilling—or unable due to the statute of limitations—to press charges; Seewald conducts his own investigation; selectively exposing alleged abusers on his Wall of Shame.

The Los Angeles Jewish Journal discussed the wall of shame similar to the Tablet and reported that JCW says that its review process includes "personal interviews with multiple alleged victims and what appears to be a thorough investigation process" and that "JCW will only post a suspect if its board unanimously agrees that the person is a child predator." It concludes that "neither Seewald nor JCW has ever been sued for libel or defamation regarding its publicizing of accused abusers."

==== Wall of Shame controversies ====
The Tablet points out that while Seewald says that molesters are more afraid of the Wall of Shame than going to jail, his "Wall of Shame has also proved to be deeply problematic, used irresponsibly, and it can easily undermine the organization's objectives and destroy an innocent person's life." Ben Hirsch, a co-founder of Survivors for Justice, an organization that advocates and educates on issues of child safety, says that Seewald is on a dangerous track. Noting that by setting up a separate registry and justice system [from law enforcement agencies], it perpetuates the same message of the rabbis that "we can deal with this issue in-house". The message must instead be that the only way to deal with child sex abuse, is to report it directly to the police.

===== Man removed after charges dropped =====
The Tablet notes a case where the wall of shame posted a special-education teacher who was accused of abuse by an autistic boy he tutored. After being arrested and charged by the Brooklyn District Attorney, the investigation was dropped when the child retracted his claim. The teacher wrote that Seewald confronted him at his house "rather aggressively", and demanded he confess to molesting the child. This individual was placed on the Wall of Shame, in an effort to warn the community of the potential harm. When the case was dismissed, JCW removed the teacher from the Wall. The exposure, he says, destroyed his career and social standing. He wrote that "In people's eyes I was no longer a Jew, let alone a human being, ... I was regarded as a monster, an out-of-control, filthy, dangerous beast; capable of snatching little children and sexually abusing them." Soon after, Seewald removed his name and picture from the blog, citing that there was insufficient evidence against him. The teacher said that because forgiveness is in his nature, he removed his article criticizing JCW and replaced it with one praising Seewald's work, blaming the student who falsely accused him rather than JCW. The Tablet concluded that JCW's credibility never fully recovered from the debacle. The Teacher wrote about his case which was published on local blogs.

JCW officially responded to this case in a letter to the teacher "Daniel G.". JCW commented that; "[individuals] who have been arrested and charged with crimes relating to child sexual abuse [will be exposed]. When an individual is charged, the charges and arrest are available on the public record and the community should be notified... Considering Jewish Community Watch was not involved with the investigation, he was immediately removed from the site and a further update was published regarding the dropped charges.

=== Project E.M.E.S. ===
JCW initiated project E.M.E.S. to warn counselors against abusing campers. The Jewish Daily Forward noted that because only two camps signed up for the program, Seewald created a video warning all camp staff members that his organization would not tolerate abuse. The video received 16,000 hits in three days.

=== Public events ===
The JCW has organized a number of public events dedicated toward addressing the issues of sexual abuse in the Orthodox Jewish community. At one event in Crown Heights, speakers included community rabbis, activists, therapists, former victims, and Brooklyn's District Attorney. Hundreds attended an event in Los Angeles, California. from which the video had a viral impact, and was reported on by several news agencies. To date, JCW has had public events in multiple cities around the world, including: Jerusalem, Efrat, Beit Shemesh (Israel), Miami, Boca Raton, Los Angeles, New York, Pittsburgh, Philadelphia, Cleveland, Las Vegas, Monsey, Toronto (California) and others. Its efforts have brought awareness worldwide to CSA.

== Endorsements ==
A comedian and local Chabad celebrity Mendy Pellin, published a letter supporting JCW. Mendy stated that "Where many of our community leaders have shied away from addressing this issue head-on, Meyer has devoted himself to doing the dirty work that needs to be done to keep our children safe."

Other endorsements include Rabbi Blau (Rabbi of Yeshiva University), Asher Lipner (a child sexual psychiatrist), Benny Forer (orthodox Jewish Deputy District Attorney) and others.

== Criticisms ==
=== Community response ===
Members of the Chabad community, posting on local news blogs, have criticized the JCW website for not providing enough information on how investigations are performed, and for not detailing the evidence behind accusations of wrongdoing. The site has also been criticized for posting incriminatory information prior to individuals being arrested or charged, and accused of later refusing to change or remove information alleged by some members of the community to be false. Other than the one claim above, no proof has ever been written or submitted demonstrating JCW has posted anyone wrongfully.

== See also ==
- Child sexual abuse
- Anti-pedophile activism
- Manny Waks, founder of Tzedek
- Creep Catchers
- The Awareness Center
- Takana
