= Menachem Elon =

Israeli High Court judge (1923–2013)

- מנחם אלון
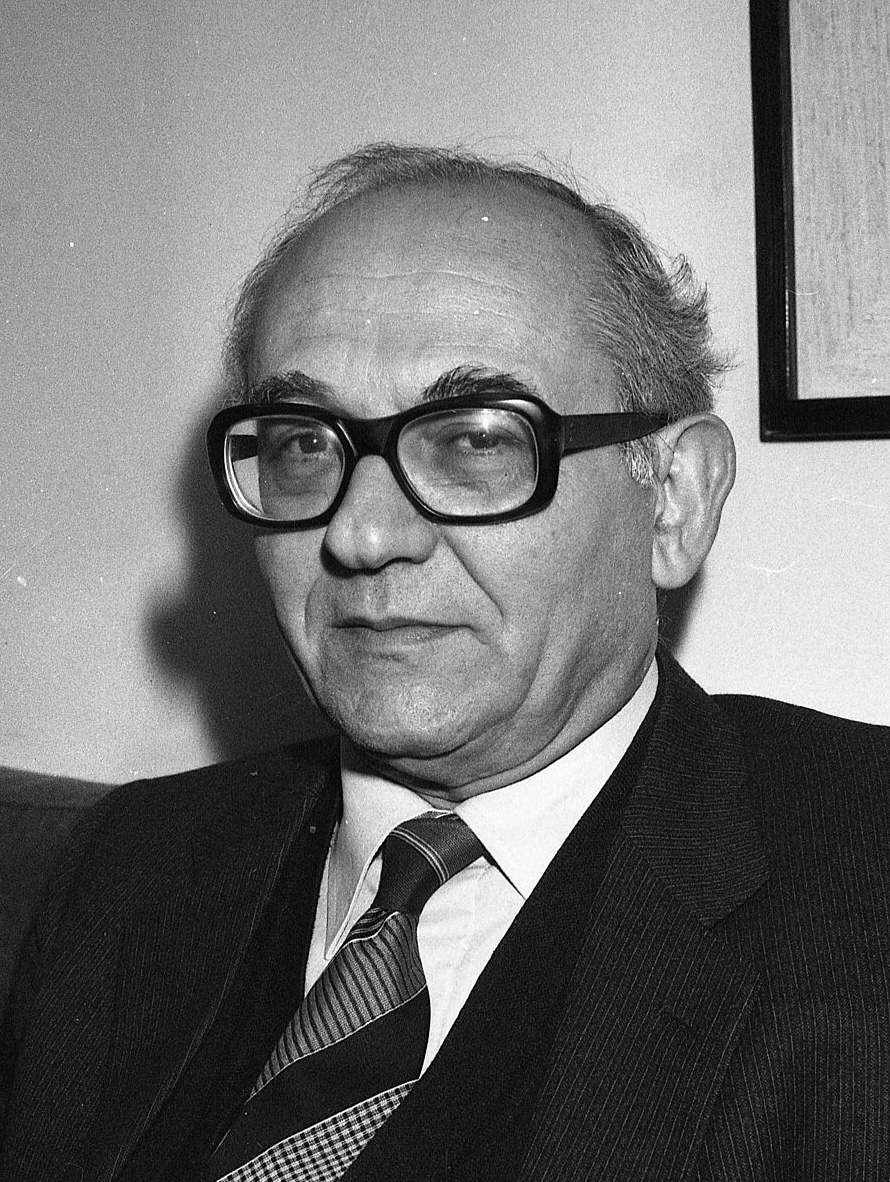
- Menachem Elon in 1983

Supreme Court of Israel judge
- In office 1977–1993

Personal details
- Born: November 1, 1923 Düsseldorf, Germany
- Died: February 6, 2013 (aged 89) Jerusalem, Israel
- Spouse: Ruth Elon (Buchsbaum)
- Relatives: Binyamin Elon (Son); Mordechai Elon (Son); Ari Elon (Son); Joseph ("Sefi") Elon (Son); Emuna Elon (Married to the son)
- Education: Hebron Yeshiva; Hebrew University of Jerusalem
- Occupation: Jurist
- Awards: 1979 Israel Prize; 1994 National Jewish Book Awards; 1994 Zeltner Prize; 1997 Knight of Quality Government; 2001 Yakir Yerushalayim

Menachem Elon (Hebrew: מנחם אלון;; November 1, 1923 – February 6, 2013) was an Israeli jurist and Professor of Law specializing in traditional Jewish Law, an Orthodox rabbi, and a prolific author on traditional Jewish law (Halakha). He was the head of the Jewish Law Institute of the Hebrew University of Jerusalem. He lost the 1983 Israeli Presidential Election to Chaim Herzog.

Elon served as a justice of the Israeli Supreme Court from 1977–1993, and as its Deputy President from 1988–1993.

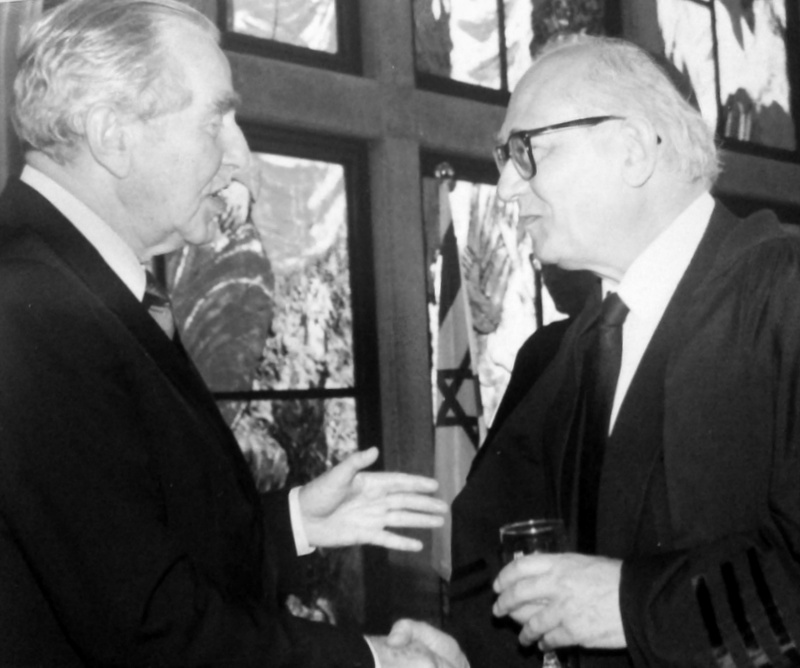
Candidates for President of Israel in 1983: Prof. Menachem Elon (coalition) and MK Chaim Herzog (opposition) in Beit HaNassi in Jerusalem

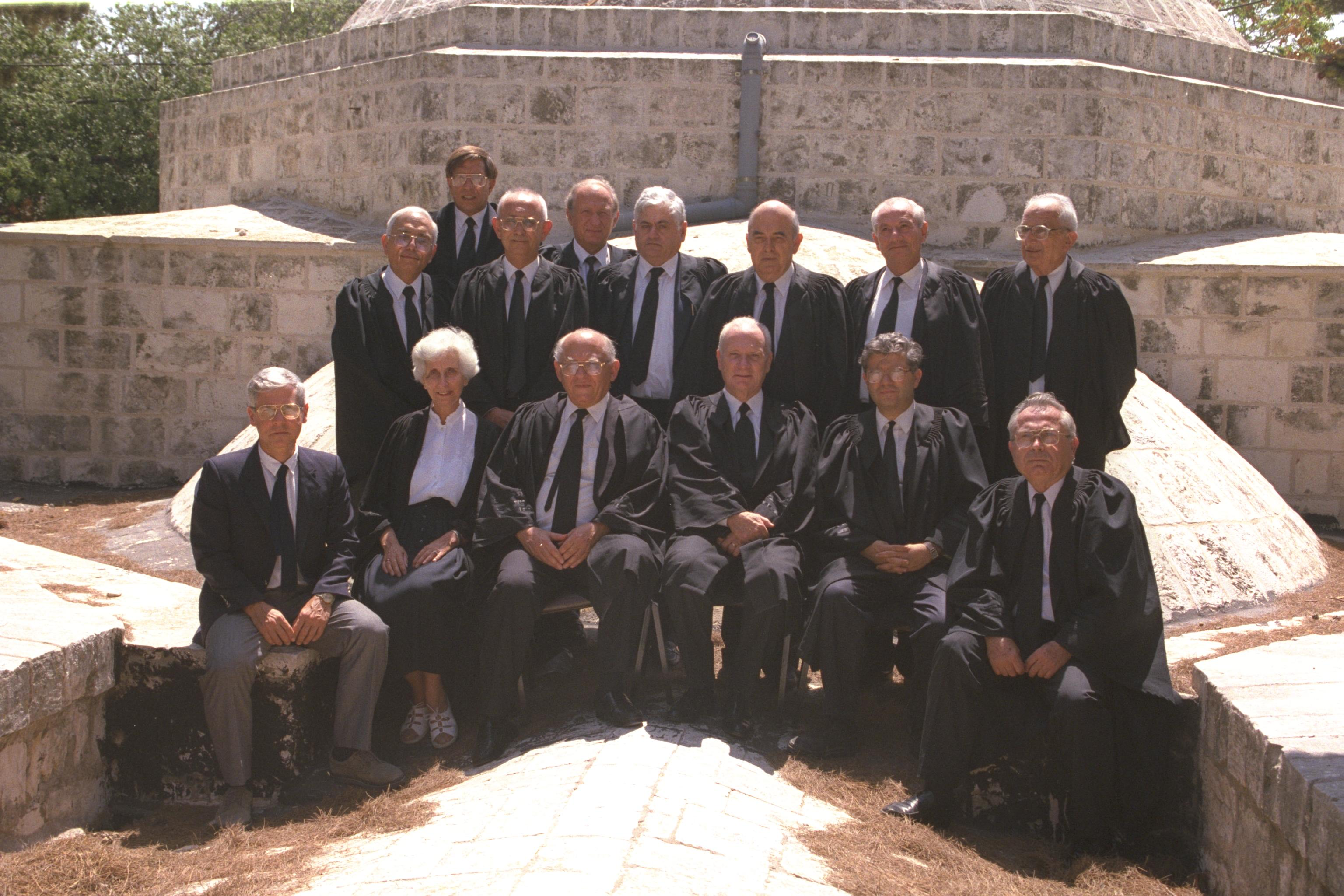
Menachem Elon (sitting third from left) With Supreme Court Justices on the roof of the old Israeli Supreme Court building in the Russian Compound in Jerusalem (1992)

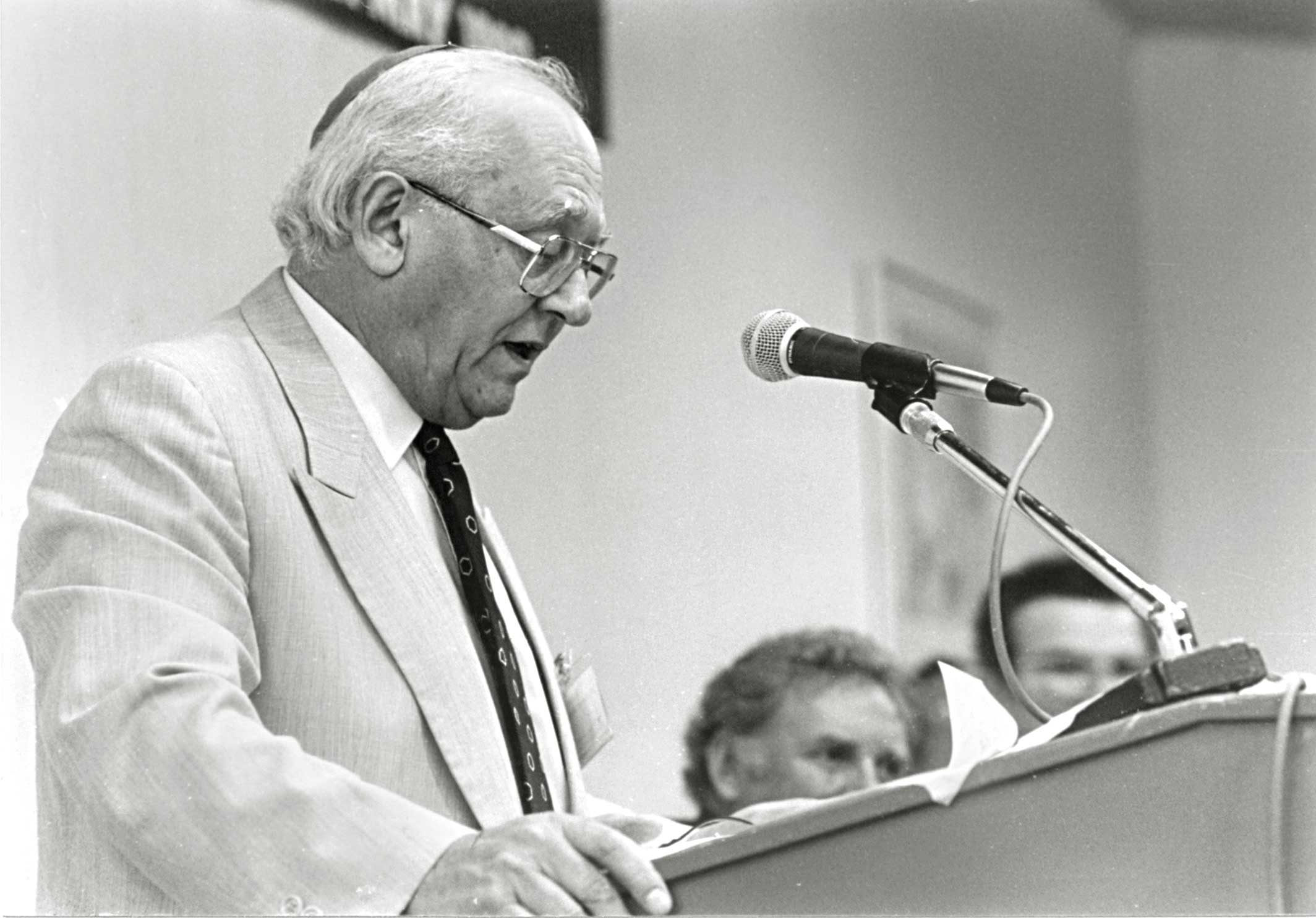
Professor Menachem Elon, Lecturing in the New York University

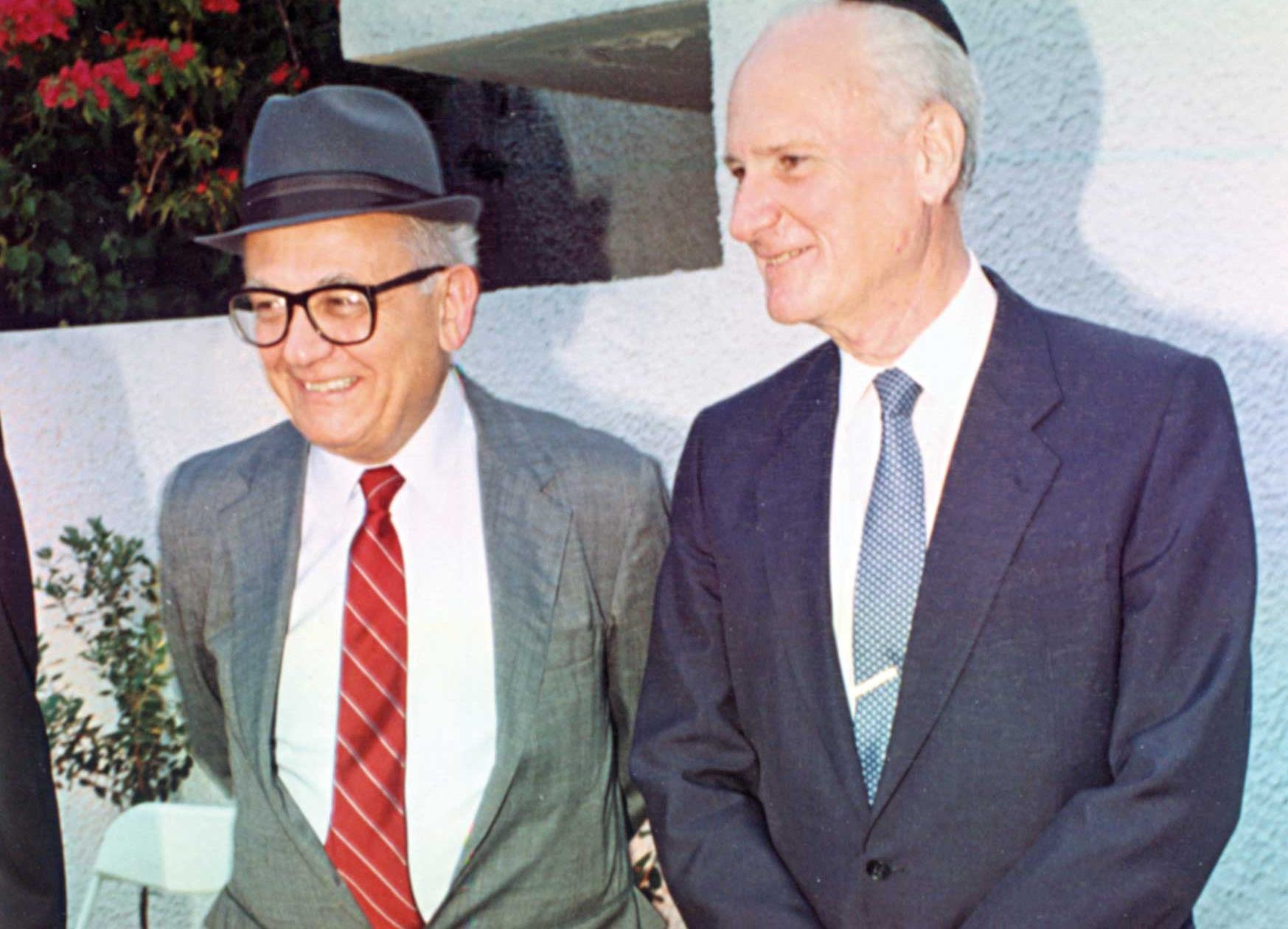
Judge Elon and Judge Shamgar

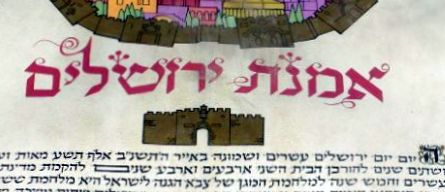
"Jerusalem Covenant" written by Elon in 1992

== Biography ==
Menachem Fetter (later Elon) was born in Düsseldorf, Germany, into a religious Jewish family from Hasidic backgrounds. Elon's family fled to the Netherlands a year before Nazism's ascent in Germany. In 1935, Elon's family immigrated to Mandatory Palestine. In 1938, he studied Halakha (traditional Jewish law) in the Hebron Yeshiva, and was ordained as a rabbi by chief rabbis Ben-Zion Meir Hai Uziel and Yitzhak HaLevi Herzog. He was among the founders of a yeshiva high school Midrashiat Noam in Pardes Hanna, and served for two years as a teacher there, and became one of the founders of the religious Kibbutz Tirat Zvi in the Beit She'an Valley.

The Elon family, a member of the religious Zionist elite, is entrenched in the world of law, politics, Literature, and Halakha (Jewish religious law). In 1949, Menachem Elon married Ruth Buchsbaum, the daughter of Dr. Mordechai Buchsbaum, an Orthodox Jewish attorney and a former deputy mayor of Jerusalem. Amongst Elon's five children are Rabbi Binyamin Elon (married to writer Emuna Elon), a former member of Knesset and cabinet minister (Minister of Tourism, 2001–2004); Rabbi Mordechai Elon, the former head of Yeshivat HaKotel; Joseph ("Sefi") Elon, a district judge in Be'er Sheva and temporary judge of the Supreme Court of Israel (2007–2009); and Ari Elon, who is secular and a lecturer on the Bible.

== Academic career ==
Elon earned his diploma from the Tel Aviv School of Law and Economics in 1948. In the early 1950s, he worked as an attorney in private practice, while at the same time completing an M.A. in Talmud, Jewish history, and philosophy at Hebrew University of Jerusalem. In 1962, he received his doctorate. In 1955, he began a parallel career as a lecturer in Hebrew law at Hebrew University, and was subsequently appointed teaching associate, senior lecturer, associate professor, and, in 1972, Professor of Jewish Law. He also served as a guest lecturer at the Faculty of Law at Oxford University, University College of London, McGill University, and University of Pennsylvania, and as a visiting professor at Harvard University School of Law and at New York University School of Law.

In 1963, Elon was appointed head of the Institute for Research in Jewish Law at the Hebrew University, where he edited 10 volumes of The Annual of the Institute for Research in Jewish Law, as well as a digest of the response of the medieval authorities. From 1968 to 1971, he served as editor of the Division of Jewish Law of the Encyclopedia Judaica, and served as the editor of the Encyclopaedia Hebraica.

He played a pivotal role in the Mishpat Ivri (Hebrew Law) movement. Among his many works, he authored the foundational Jewish Law : History, Sources, Principles - a monumental, three-volume book on Hebrew law for academic use and the training of Israeli law students. In 1955, he was appointed senior assistant to the Attorney General of Israel Haim Cohn, and from 1959 to 1966, Elon served as adviser on Jewish Law to the Israel Ministry of Justice, a job which included writing legal opinions based on Jewish law regarding every law proposed in Knesset. He was a member of numerous Israeli Public Inquiry committees, and he served on committees to prepare legal proposals in various fields of civil law.

In 1979, Elon was awarded the Israel Prize for Hebrew law.

== Supreme Court of Israel ==
In 1977, he was appointed to the Israeli Supreme Court. Elon's rulings often drew upon the principles of Jewish law; he sought to incorporate traditional Halakha into the corpus of Israeli civil law. Elon emerged as a prominent critic of former president of the Supreme Court Aharon Barak's judicial activism.

Elon was involved in a number of important verdicts, including the acquittal of Nazi war criminal John Demjanjuk.

Among Elon's prominent decisions were a ruling prohibiting registering the character of non-Orthodox conversions on Israeli identity cards, one ordering the return of a girl who had been transferred for adoption without her parents' consent, and the decision to order a local religious service committee to accept Leah Shakdiel as its first female member. In 1988, he ruled that active euthanasia ("mercy killing") was illegal, because it negated the values of the State of Israel as a Jewish state (Yael Shefer v. The State of Israel).

In 1988, he was promoted to the position of deputy president of the Supreme Court, under Meir Shamgar. He served in this position until his retirement in 1993 after 16 years as a justice; he was succeeded as deputy president by Aharon Barak.

== Presidential nomination ==
Supported by Menachem Begin and the coalition (Likud party), Elon was nearly selected as President of the State of Israel, losing in a close vote (61-57) to his childhood friend Chaim Herzog in 1983.

== Resumption of academic career ==
After retiring from the Supreme Court in 1993, he was elected President of the World Union of Jewish Studies, and served in that capacity until 2005. In 1995, he founded and became the founding dean of Sha'arei Mishpat College for the first eight years of its existence. Elon headed a number of non-profit organizations, and sat on the boards of others. He also continued to write and teach at universities around the world. In 1992, Elon wrote the "Jerusalem Covenant" - a mosaic dealing with the centrality of Jerusalem in Jewish life - signed on the 25th Jerusalem Day.

Menachem Elon died in Jerusalem on February 6, 2013, and was buried in Har HaMenuchot (Jerusalem). He was 89.

== Awards and honors ==
- in 1978, Katz Prize for Jewish studies.
- in 1979, Elon was awarded the Israel Prize in jurisprudence.
- in 1979, Ben-Meir Prize for Mishpat Ivri Research.
- In 1994, won a National Jewish Book Award for the English translation of the book "Jewish law: history, sources, principles".
- in 1994, Elon was awarded the Zeltner Prize for Legal Research.
- in 1996, won the Israel Bar Association prize
- in 1997, he received Honorary Degrees from Bar-Ilan University.
- in 1997, Elon was awarded the "Knight of Quality Government" from Movement for Quality Government in Israel.
- in 1999, he received Honorary Degrees from Jerusalem College of Technology
- in 2001, he received the Yakir Yerushalayim (Worthy Citizen of Jerusalem) and Yakir Safed (2004).

== Published works ==
=== Selected works in English ===
- Jewish Law: History, Sources, Principles, The Jewish Publication Society, 1994. ISBN 0-8276-0389-4.
- Decision of the Supreme Court of Israel in the Shefer Case (Yael Shefer v. The State of Israel), Falk Schlesinger Institute, 1996.
- The Tears of the Oppressed: An Examination Of The Agunah Problem: Background And Halakhic Sources, Ktav Pub Inc, 2004.
- The Ethiopian Jews (Bene Israel: a case study in the functioning of the Jewish legal system, New York, 1987.
- Talmudic civil law, New York, 1984.
- Jewish Law (Mishpat Ivri): Cases and Materials, Published by LexisNexis, New York, 1999.

=== Original writings (Hebrew) ===
- The Freedom of the Person of the Debtor in Jewish Law, Magnes, Jerusalem, 1964.
- Legislation in the Laws of the State of Israel and Within the Jurisdiction of the Civil and Rabbinical Courts, Published by Religious Kibbutz Movement, 1968.
- Mishpat Ivri – The sources and nature of Jewish law and its application in the state of Israel, Magnes, Jerusalem, 1973.
- Human Dignity and Freedom in the Methods of Enforcement of Judgments – The Values of a Jewish and Democratic State, Magnes, Jerusalem, 1999.
- The Status of Women – Law and Jurisdict, Tradition and transition, Press The Kibbutz Consolidated, Tel Aviv, 2005.

=== Edited books ===
- Digest of Responsa Literature of Spain and North Africa, Publisher The Hebrew University Magnes Press Ltd, Jerusalem, 1981.
- Indices to the Responsa of Jewish Law: The Responsa of R. Asher ben Jehiel, Publisher The Hebrew University Magnes Press Ltd, Jerusalem, 1965.
- Indices to the Responsa of Jewish Law: The Responsa of R. Yom Tov Asevilli, Publisher The Hebrew University Magnes Press Ltd, Jerusalem, 1973.
- Indices to the Responsa of Jewish Law: The Responsa of R. Judah ben Asher, Publisher The Hebrew University Magnes Press Ltd, 1973.
- The Principles of Jewish Law, Keter Publishing House, Jerusalem, 1975.

== See also ==
- List of Israel Prize recipients
- 1983 Israeli presidential election
