= Pinchas Hacohen Peli =

Israeli poet

Rabbi Pinchas Hacohen Peli
- פינחס פֶּלִאי הכהן
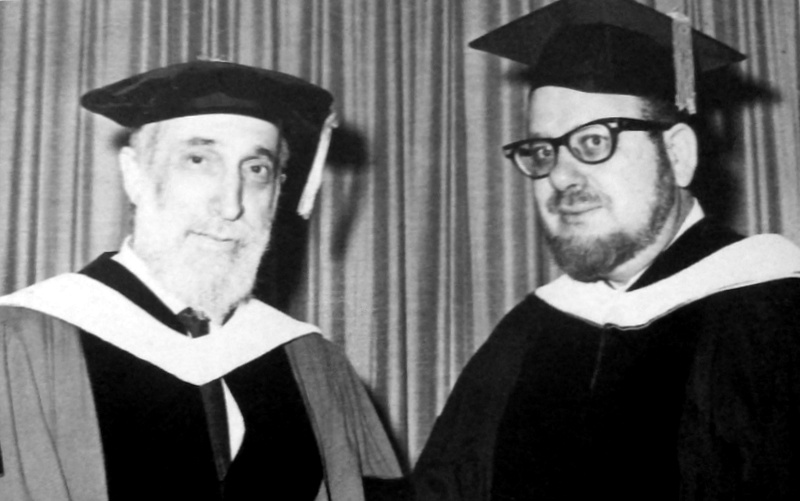
- Pinchas Hacohen Peli (right) & Louis Finkelstein (left), New York, 1969

Personal life
- Born: May 6, 1930 Jerusalem, Israel
- Died: April 3, 1989 (aged 58) Jerusalem, Israel
- Spouse: Penina Cohen
- Children: Dr. Bitkha Har-Shefi, Emuna Elon, Bat-Sheva Peli-Seri, Deuell Peli
- Education: Hebrew University of Jerusalem
- Occupation: Rabbi, essayist, poet, scholar

Religious life
- Religion: Judaism
- Denomination: Modern Orthodox

Pinchas Hacohen Peli (Hebrew: פינחס פֶּלִאי הכהן; 6 May 1930 – 3 April 1989) was an Israeli modern Orthodox rabbi, essayist, poet, and scholar of Judaism and Jewish philosophy.

== Early life ==
He was born in Jerusalem, Israel in 1930 to a Hasidic family named Hacohen.

At age 16, he started publishing poetry in the Israeli newspaper Davar. He used the pen name "Peli" ("wonder") because he was afraid to use his real name, given that his family was a distinguished rabbinical family living in Jerusalem's ultra-Orthodox neighborhood of Mea Shearim. He subsequently adopted it as his actual name.

Peli received a B.A in Jewish History and Talmud at the Hebrew University of Jerusalem and became a strong supporter of Religious Zionism.

== Academic career ==
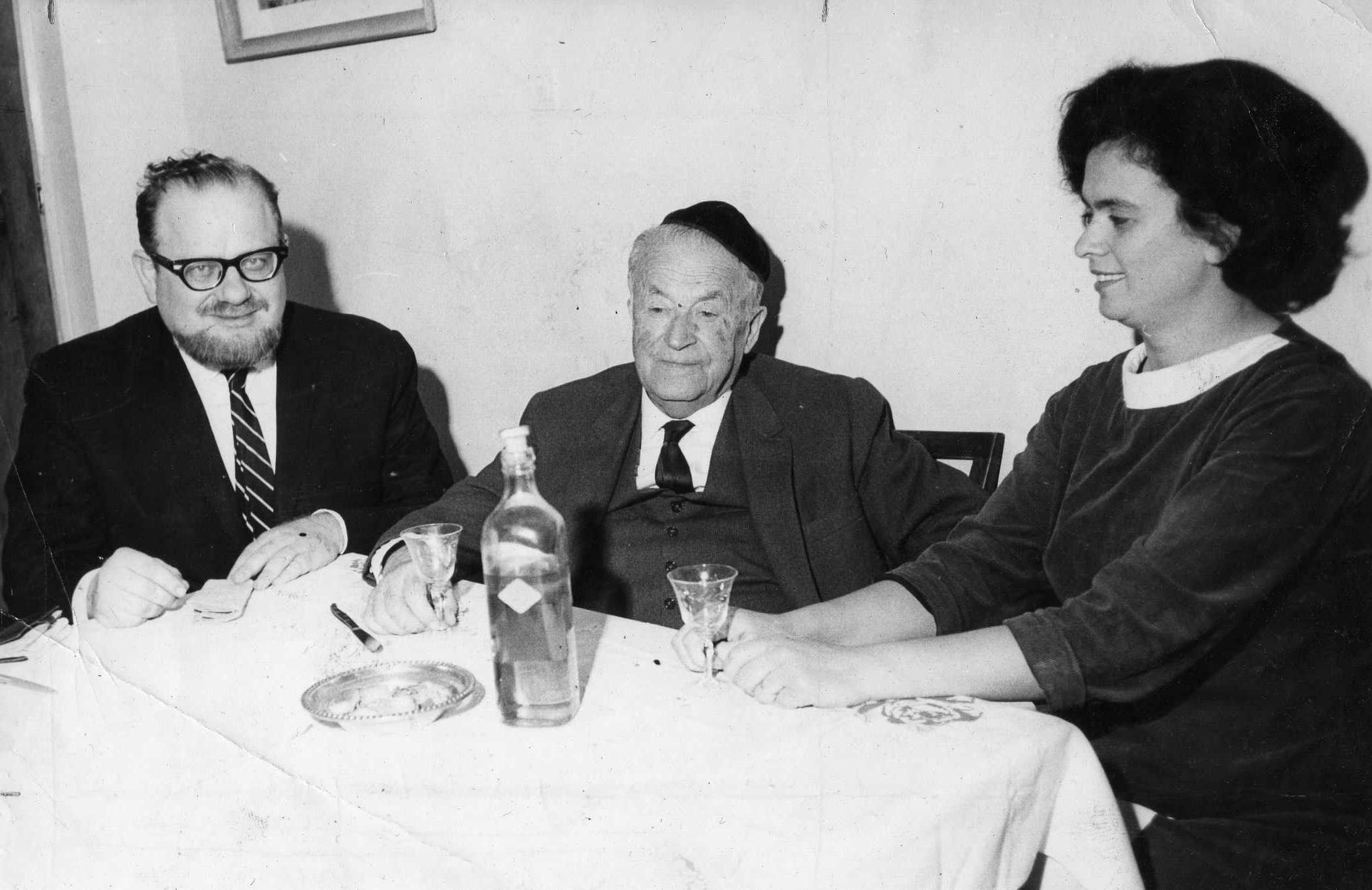
Pinchas and Penina Peli, with author Shai Agnon, at their home

He was Professor of Jewish Thought and Literature at the Ben-Gurion University of the Negev, and a visiting professor at Yeshiva University, Cornell University, Notre Dame University, the Seminario Rabbinico in Argentina, and the Makuya Bible Seminary in Japan.

He was also the editor of the Encyclopaedia Judaica Year Book, the Jerusalem Quarterly for Literature, and Panim-el-Panim ("Face to Face"), and served as the Torah Commentator for the Jerusalem Post.

His writings include studies of the thought of rabbis Abraham Joshua Heschel and Joseph B. Soloveitchik, discussions concerning Shabbat, the Land of Israel, anti-Semitism, the problem of evil, and commentary on the weekly Torah portion (parsha).

== Interfaith activity ==
Frequently lecturing to both Jews and Christians, he participated in the Israel Interfaith Committee and discussed Jewish-Catholic relations at the Vatican.

== Friendship with Joseph B. Soloveitchik ==
While a professor at Yeshiva University between 1967 and 1971, he became a friend and important disciple of Rabbi Joseph B. Soloveitchik, publishing a volume based on his oral discourses entitled On Repentance (Hebrew "Al haTeshuva", Jerusalem 1979), redacting the major points of Soloveitchik's teachings. See Joseph B. Soloveitchik § Works by Joseph Soloveitchik.

== Views ==
Peli opposed efforts to impose greater religious control over life in Israel. He told an interviewer in 1986, "I think for the sake of religion and for the sake of Israel there must be a separation between state and religion."

== Family ==
Peli married his cousin Penina Cohen, whom he met in 1951 when he went to the United States as emissary of the Jewish Agency, lecturing on behalf of the Synagogue Council of America and the Israel Bonds organization.

They raised four children:

- Dr. Bitkha Har-Shefi, lecturer of Talmud at Hebrew Union College
- Emuna Elon, Israeli author and journalist, who is married to Rabbi Binyamin Elon
- Bat-Sheva Peli-Seri, active in Kolech, the Israeli Religious Women's Forum
- Deuell Peli, a lawyer

== Death ==
Peli died in Jerusalem on 3 April 1989 and is buried in Jerusalem's Mount of Olives Jewish Cemetery.

== Works ==
- Abraham Joshua Heschel: An intellectual Biography (New York University Press, 1986)
- Torah Today: A Renewed Encounter With Scripture, (1987)
- Shabbat Shalom: A Renewed Encounter with the Sabbath, (1988)
- Chapters in Jewish Thought in the Land of Israel, (1990)
- (ed.) On Repentance: The Thought and Oral Discourses of Rabbi Joseph Dov Soloveitchik (1980)
