= Michael Kleiner =

Israeli politician (born 1948)

- מיכאל קליינר
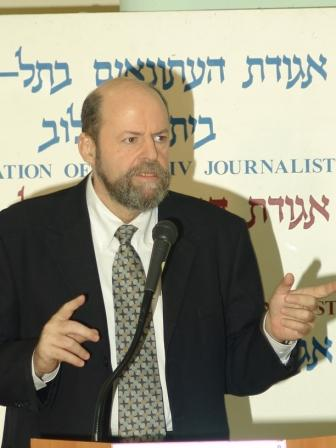

Faction represented in the Knesset
- 1982–1984: Likud
- 1988–1992: Likud
- 1996–1999: Likud
- 1999: Herut – The National Movement
- 1999–2000: National Union
- 2000–2003: Herut – The National Movement

Personal details
- Born: 4 April 1948 (age 78) Munich, Germany

Michael Kleiner (Hebrew: מיכאל קליינר; born 4 April 1948) is an Israeli politician and was the leader of Herut – The National Movement. He is currently the President of the Supreme Court of the Israeli Likud party.

== Biography ==
Michael Kleiner was born in Munich, Germany. His father was Ya'acov Kleiner and his mother was Paula Zweigenhaft (a first cousin of Rabbi Shlomo Zev Zweigenhaft), both of whom were originally from Sosnowiec, Poland. Michael immigrated to Israel with his family in 1951.

Kleiner first entered the Knesset in 1982 as a Likud parliamentarian, but, upon then-Prime Minister Benjamin Netanyahu's relinquishing of Hebron to the Palestinian Authority, Kleiner split off from the Likud, along with Benny Begin (Menachem Begin's son) and David Re'em, to establish Herut – The National Movement, based on the original Herut. The three enjoyed the political support of former Prime Minister Yitzhak Shamir and long-time Revisionist author and original Herut Knesset member Shmuel Katz, which greatly legitimized their use of the name Herut. They initially ran for the 15th Knesset as part of the National Union block, together with Tkuma and Moledet, but after a poor electoral showing of only four seats, Begin resigned from politics, and Kleiner assumed the party's leadership. Eventually breaking off from the National Union, Kleiner and Herut failed to be re-elected in the 2003 election.

Michael Kleiner is known for his uncompromising views on retaining territory reclaimed in the 1967 Six-Day War. Kleiner's Jewish nationalism stems from the teachings of Zev Jabotinsky.

Kleiner has consistently acted to thwart the Israeli government's destruction of Israeli settlements in the Gaza Strip and West Bank, although he has failed to garner the political support of most religious Israeli settlers. He has not been a member of the 16th or 17th Knessets because his party did not meet the minimum vote requirement.

Since 2012, he is a member of the board of directors of the Ghetto Fighters House. He is also a chairman of the board of directors of the building company "Aura Israel".

In July 2013, he was elected President of the Supreme Court of Netanyahu's Likud party. The Court is the party's highest judicial body in all matters pertaining to its constitution, and party members and divisions are subject to its decisions.

He was questioned in August 2026 over possible tax fraud.
