= Paul Eidelberg =

American-Israeli political scientist

Paul Eidelberg (Hebrew: פול איידלברג; born 1928) is an American-Israeli political scientist, author and lecturer, and is the founder and president of The Foundation for Constitutional Democracy, with offices in Jerusalem. He is also president of the Yamin Yisrael Party.

== Early career ==
Eidelberg served in the United States Air Force where he held the rank of first lieutenant. He received his doctoral degree at the University of Chicago where he studied under Leo Strauss. He designed the electronic equipment for the first brain scanner at the Argonne Cancer Research Hospital.

== Academic career ==
Before immigrating to Israel in 1976, Eidelberg wrote a trilogy on America’s founding fathers: The Philosophy of the American Constitution (ISBN 0819153419), On the Silence of the Declaration of Independence (ISBN 0870232169), and a Discourse on Statesmanship (ISBN 0252004280).

In 1976 he joined the faculty of Bar-Ilan University, and holds adjunct positions at Otago University in New Zealand and The University of Georgia.

He has written several books on the Arab-Israel conflict and on Judaism. Demophrenia (ISBN 093345127X) analyses the mentality of Israel’s ruling elites. Jewish Statesmanship: Lest Israel Fall (ISBN 0761823808), which has been translated into Hebrew and Russian, discusses what he sees as the flaws inherent in Israel’s system of governance and how they may be remedied. His work, A Jewish Philosophy of History (ISBN 0595316956), investigates the world-historical events leading to the rebirth of Israel in 1948.

== Policy and politics ==
Eidelberg is on the Advisory Council of the Ariel Center for Policy Research, which has published many of his policy papers. In addition to writing more than 1,000 articles for newspapers and scholarly journals in the U.S. and Israel, he is a weekly guest on The Tamar Yonah Show on Arutz Sheva radio.

In 2003, Eidelberg's Yamin Yisrael ran with Herut – The National Movement for the Knesset elections of that year. The joint list fell 8,000 votes short of the electoral threshold. After the elections Herut and Yamin Yisrael parted ways.

In 2005, Yamin Yisrael merged with the Jewish National Front. Eidelberg stood number seven on the JNF's list for the Israeli Knesset for the 2006 election. The party did not pass Israel's electoral threshold. Yamin Yisrael and the JNF have since parted ways due to political and ideological differences.

Eidelberg has a weekly column in the Jewish Press, a leading American Orthodox Jewish newspaper.

== Published works ==
Eidelberg has published numerous papers and articles. Some of his published books include:

- The fixation of Israel's elites on "land for peace" : five interpretations, Shaare Tikvah : Ariel Center for Policy Research, 2007. ISBN 965-7165-76-8
- On the silence of the Declaration of independence, Amherst : University of Massachusetts Press, 1976. ISBN 978-0-87023-216-9
- Our culture 'left' or 'right' : litterateurs confront nihilism (with Will Morrisey), E. Mellen Press, 1992, Lewiston, N.Y., 1992. ISBN 978-0-7734-9171-7
- ''Jewish statesmanship : lest Israel fall, University Press of America, Lanham, Md. 2002 ISBN 978-0-7618-2380-3
- A Jewish philosophy of history : Israel's degradation and redemption Lightcatcher Books, 2007 Springdale, Ark. ISBN 978-0-9719388-9-2
- A discourse on statesmanship; the design and transformation of the American polity. University of Illinois Press, Urbana, 1974 ISBN 978-0-252-00428-5
- Judaic man : toward a reconstruction of Western civilization, Caslon Co., Middletown, NJ, 1996. ISBN 978-0-391-03970-4
- Jerusalem vs. Athens : in quest of a general theory of existence University Press of America, Lanham, Md. 1983 ISBN 978-0-8191-3489-9
- Beyond the secular mind : a Jewish response to the problems of modernity Greenwood Press, New York, 1989 ISBN 978-0-313-26663-8

== See also ==
- Eidelberg
