= Yosef Blau =

American Orthodox rabbi

Rabbi Yosef Blau

Personal life
- Education: Yeshiva University

Religious life
- Religion: Judaism
- Denomination: Orthodox

Jewish leader
- Yeshiva: Yeshiva University
- Organization: Religious Zionists of America
- Semikhah: RIETS

Yosef Blau is an American-Israeli Orthodox rabbi. He was the mashgiach ruchani at Rabbi Isaac Elchanan Theological Seminary from 1977 to 2025. He is also the former president of the Religious Zionists of America.

== Education ==
Blau earned his Bachelor of Arts degree in 1959 from Yeshiva College studying Mathematics. He earned a Masters of Science degree at Yeshiva University's Belfer Graduate School of Science in 1960, and was ordained at Rabbi Isaac Elchanan Theological Seminary in 1961 by Rabbi Yosef Dov Soloveitchik.

== Career ==
In the past, he served as the assistant principal at the Maimonides School in Brookline, Massachusetts, principal at the Hebrew Theological College in Skokie, Illinois, and principal at the Jewish Educational Center in Elizabeth, New Jersey.

In communal life, Blau served as national president of Yavneh, the National Religious Jewish Students Association, and as a member of that organization's National Advisory Board. He also served as vice president of the National Conference of Yeshiva Principals.

Blau is a member of the Rabbinical Council of America and serves on the executive board of the Orthodox Caucus, a national task force addressing practical issues challenging the Jewish world. He is also on the executive commission of the Orthodox Forum and the rabbinic advisory board of USSR, (Students Serving Soviet Jewry). He has lectured and taught Torah around the world.

Blau previously served on the executive board of directors of The Awareness Center. On December 22, 2009, he was the moderator on a panel in Yeshiva University dealing with homosexual men in the Orthodox Jewish community.

Blau serves as one of the board of directors for Jewish Community Watch, an organization focusing on child abuse awareness and prevention within the Orthodox community.

In March, 2025, Blau made Aliyah, immigrating to live in Jerusalem. Immediately thereafter, he spoke, via video, at the inaugural conference of the American wing of Smol Emuni ("the faithful left") held at B'nai Jeshurun. He argued that the mainstream religious Zionist movement in Israel had become intertwined with "extreme right-wing politics." In particular, he spoke out against the Israeli Minister of Diaspora Affairs, Amichai Chikli, for alienating diaspora Jewry.

== Controversies ==
In August 2025, Blau was the lead signer in a letter by orthodox rabbis regarding the Gaza Humanitarian Crisis. Many leading orthodox writers and rabbis criticized Blau's letter, with one calling it "shameful" and another "reckless", and questioning his ability to judge the all the details such a letter would be based on. Many others praised his moral strength and the sensitivity of the statement he wrote, signed by more than 80 rabbis.

== Personal ==
Rabbi Blau married Rivkah Teitz, daughter of Rabbi Mordechai Pinchas Teitz, in June 1962. Until moving to Israel in March 2025, they lived in Washington Heights. They have three sons: Binyamin, Yitzchak and Yaakov.
