= 1983 Israeli presidential election =

- 22 March 1983

120 members of the Knesset Simple majority of votes needed to win
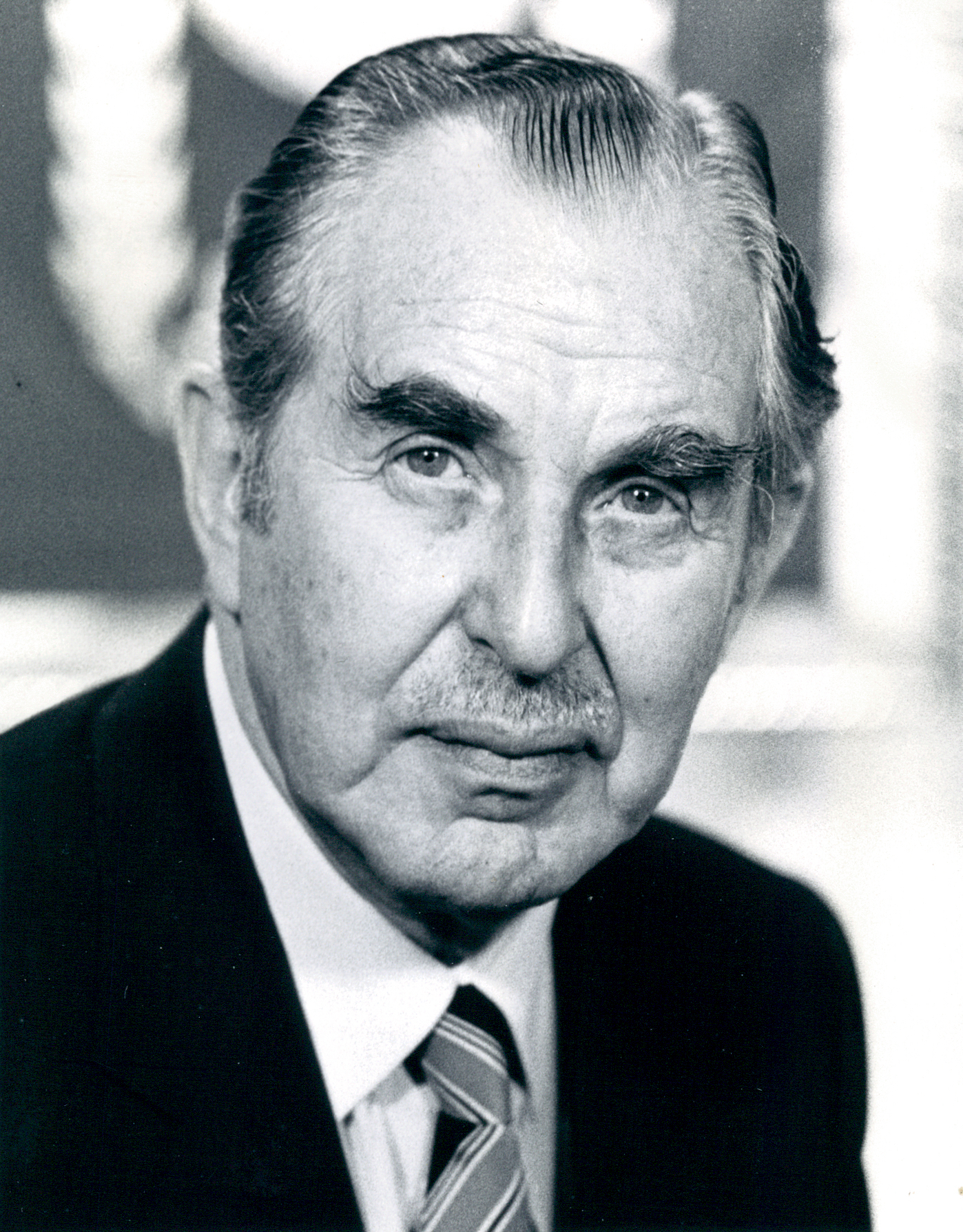

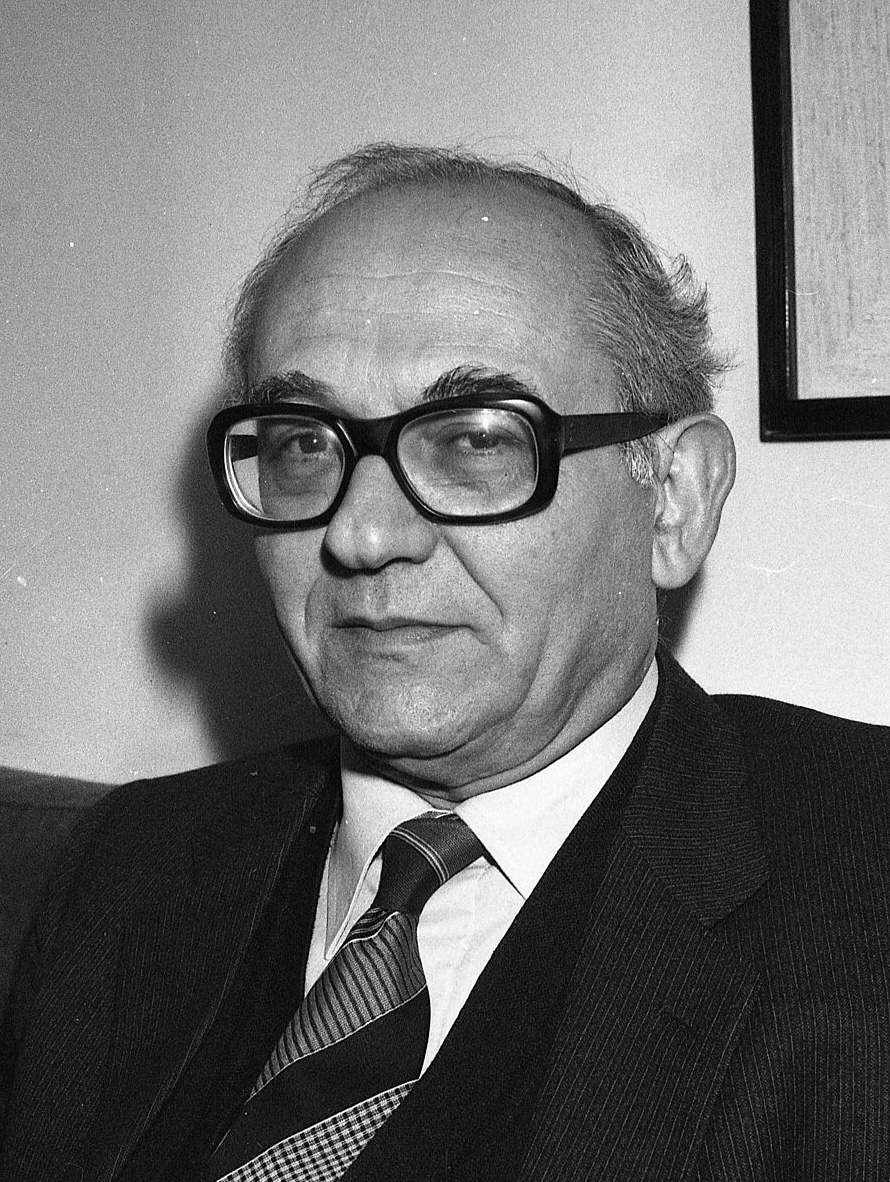
| Nominee | Chaim Herzog | Menachem Elon |
| Party | Alignment | Independent |
| Electoral vote | 61 | 57 |
President before election
Yitzhak Navon
Alignment
Elected President
Chaim Herzog
Alignment

An election for President of Israel was held in the Knesset on 22 March 1983 in which Chaim Herzog was elected the sixth president of the state of Israel.

== History ==
Yitzhak Navon, elected in 1978, turned down the opportunity to run for a second term of office. Chaim Herzog was elected by the Knesset to serve as the sixth President of Israel, by a vote of 61 to 57. He was opposed by Menachem Elon, the candidate of the right and the government coalition. Herzog's term began on 5 May. He held office until 1993, when Ezer Weizman was elected president.

== Results ==
| Candidate | Party | Votes | % |
|---|---|---|---|
| Chaim Herzog | Alignment | 61 | 51.69 |
| Menachem Elon | Independent | 57 | 48.31 |
| Total | | 118 | 100.00 |
| Valid votes | | 118 | 98.33 |
| Invalid votes | | 0 | 0.00 |
| Blank votes | | 2 | 1.67 |
| Total votes | | 120 | 100.00 |
| Registered voters/turnout | | 120 | 100.00 |
