= BINA: The Jewish Movement for Social Change =

Jewish social and educational organization in Israel

BINA: The Jewish Movement for Social Change is a Jewish non-profit organization and educational institution that offers pluralistic programs and forums for adults to study Judaism and prepare for the Israeli Defense Force (IDF). It was founded in 1996, and has centers in Tel Aviv, Jerusalem, Haifa and Beer Sheva, all in Israel. BINA means "wisdom" in Hebrew and is an acronym for "A Home for the Creation of Our Nation's Souls", a phrase coined by Hebrew poet Chaim Nachman Bialik.

== History ==
BINA was founded as the "Center for Jewish Identity and Hebrew Culture'" by a group of scholars and educators from the Kibbutz Movement and operates under the Israeli nonprofit Merhavim Hevra Lehinuch Vetarbut. The organization's stated mission is to engage secular Israelis and Jews from all over the world in Jewish study, social justice and action, community, leadership, and to strengthen the democratic and pluralistic aspects of Israel through the notion of "repairing the world", tikkun olam.

The assassination of Prime Minister Yitzhak Rabin in 1995 led many non-observant Jews to a desire to express their Judaism culturally, but not necessarily religiously. During this time, BINA was created to encourage secular Israelis and Jewish people to reconnect with Israel and Jewish values, and explore Jewish identity.

BINA is supported by the Posen Foundation and other donors in Israel and the USA.

The organization established the first Secular Yeshiva in Israel and currently operates branches in Tel-Aviv, Jerusalem, Haifa and Beer Sheva.

== Programs ==
The programs offered by BINA are targeted towards the secular Israeli community and diaspora Jews wanting to visit Israel.

BINA provides tutoring for underprivileged children and programs for at risk youth.

The BINA Secular Yeshiva was established in 2006 in south Tel Aviv, one of the most underserved communities in Israel. The Secular Yeshiva is a Jewish cultural and educational center where young adults study and interpret Jewish texts and culture and holiday services are open to the public. In 2015, there were over 200 students enrolled in the Secular Yeshiva's seven main programs. In 2011 BINA's Jerusalem Secular Yeshiva was opened.

BINA offers weekend seminars and single-day workshops for numerous IDF units of soldiers and officers. These workshops are focused on Jewish Identity in the context of the military.

== Faculty ==
The faculty of BINA consists of historians, writers and educators, including: Haim Be'er, Dov Elbaum, Ari Elon, Rabbi Benny Lau, Ronny Someck, Tsvia Walden.

== Achievements ==
BINA was awarded the Constantine Prize in Jewish Education from Tel-Aviv University for using Jewish values to promote community service and social justice in youth.

In 2013 BINA acquired a public tender for teaching a course to Israel Defense Forces (IDF) officers designed to strengthen their Jewish and Israeli values and character.
