= Eidelberg =

Eidelberg (Russian: Эйдельберг) is a surname. Notable people with the surname include:

- Joseph Eidelberg, Israeli historian
- Martin Eidelberg, American art historian
- Paul Eidelberg, American-Israeli political scientist and author

== See also ==
- Eidelberger
- Edelmann (Edelman)
