= Ari Elon =

Israeli writer

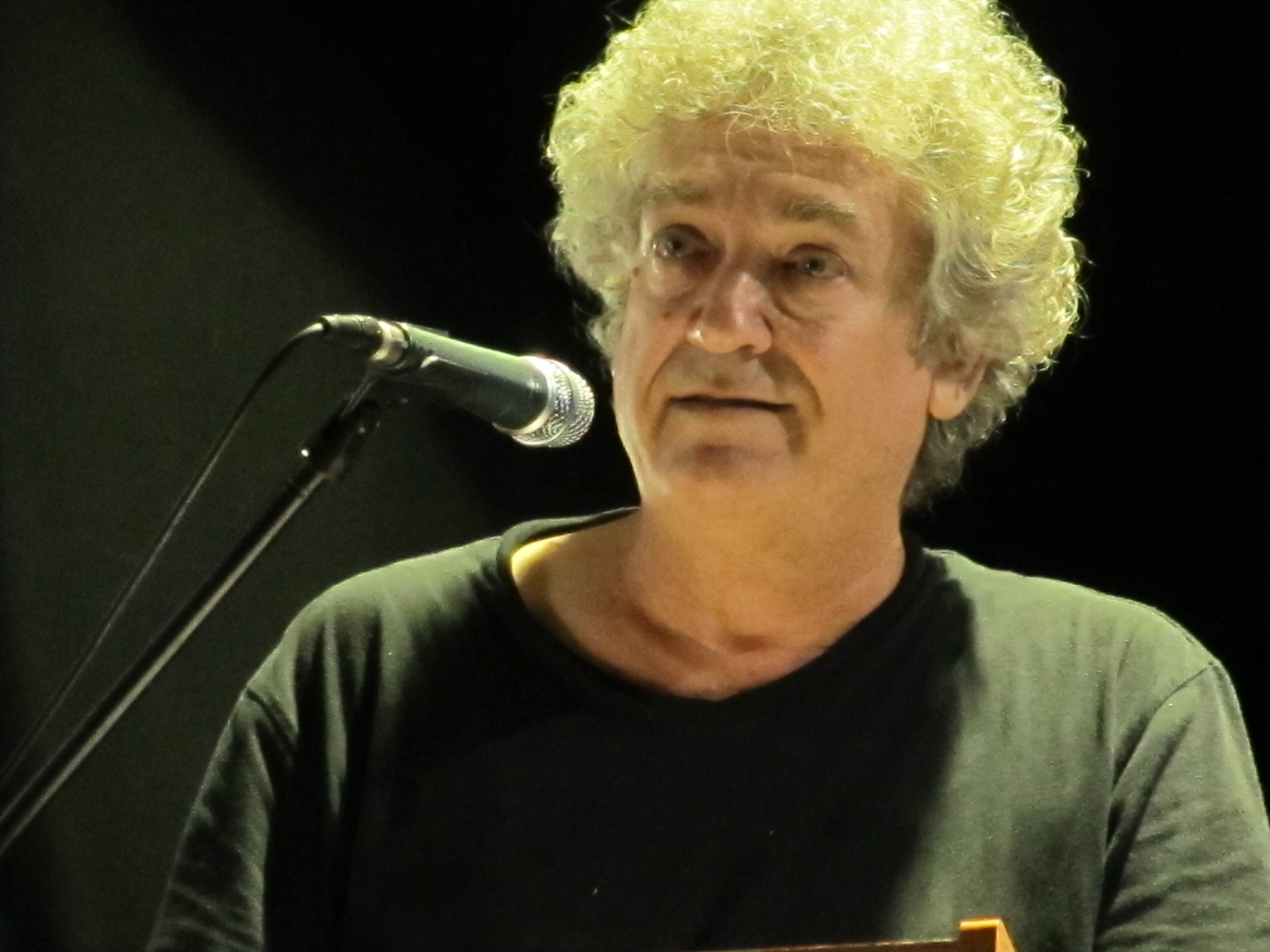
Ari Elon

Ari Elon (Hebrew: ארי אלון; born 1950) is an Israeli writer, a Talmud scholar and educator.

Elon was born in Jerusalem in 1950. He is the son of former Israel Supreme Court Justice Menachem Elon. Elon's brothers include the late Israeli politician, MK Benny Elon, Rabbi Mordechai Elon and Be'er Sheva District Court Judge Joseph ("Sefi") Elon .

Despite his family's religious background, he became secular at a young age. He taught Talmud and Midrash at The Hebrew University of Jerusalem. Elon taught at various institutions throughout Israel, including BINA Center for Jewish Identity and Hebrew Culture, and served as the director of the Rabbinic Texts Program at the Reconstructionist Rabbinical College in Philadelphia.

== Published works ==
- From Jerusalem to the Edge of Heaven, Jewish Publication Society, 1996
- Trees, Earth, and Torah: A Tu B'Shvat Anthology, (Editor) The Jewish Publication Society, 2000
- Ba el ha-ḳodesh : 36 agadot nistarot, Yediʻot aḥaronot, 2005
