= Shaul Gutman =

Israeli politician and academic (born 1945)

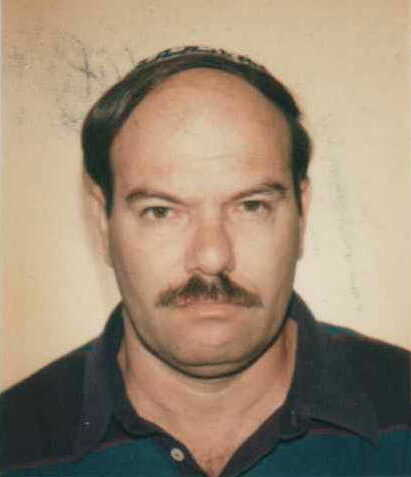
- Gutman in the 1990s

Faction represented in the Knesset
- 1992–1995: Moledet
- 1995–1996: Yamin Yisrael

Personal details
- Born: 9 September 1945 (age 80) Be'erot Yitzhak, Mandatory Palestine

Shaul Gutman (Hebrew: שאול גוטמן; born 9 September 1945) is an Israeli academic and former politician.

== Biography ==
Born in Be'erot Yitzhak during the Mandate era, Gutman grew up in Rehovot and studied at the Technion and Berkeley, before returning to the Technion as a professor.

In 1992 he was elected to the Knesset on the Moledet list. However, he left the party on 24 July 1995 to establish Yamin Yisrael. He lost his seat when the party failed to cross the electoral threshold in the 1996 elections.
