= Benny Begin =

Israeli politician

- בני בגין
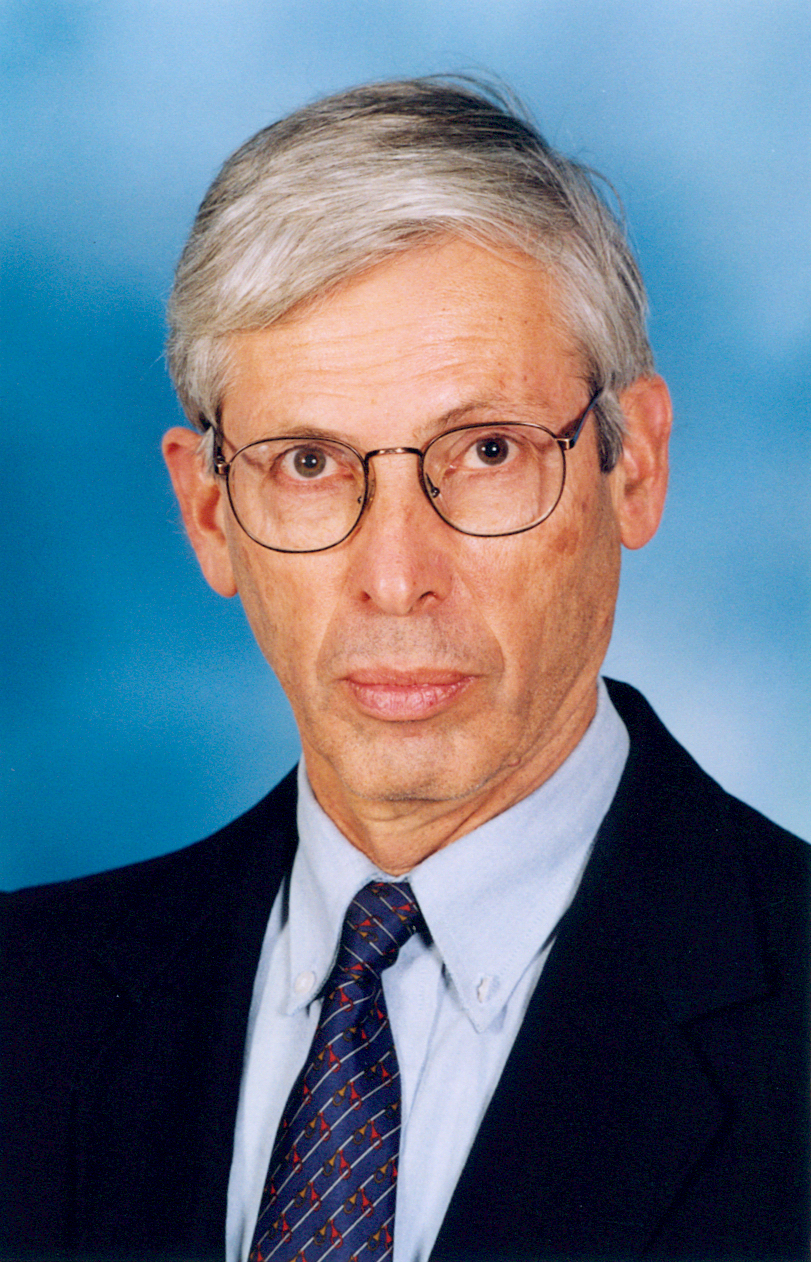

Ministerial roles
- 1996–1997: Minister of Science
- 2009–2013: Minister without Portfolio
- 2015: Minister without Portfolio

Faction represented in the Knesset
- 1988–1999: Likud
- 1999: Herut – The National Movement
- 2009–2013: Likud
- 2015–2019: Likud
- 2021–2022: New Hope

Personal details
- Born: 1 March 1943 (age 83) Jerusalem, Mandatory Palestine

Ze'ev Binyamin (Benny) Begin (Hebrew: זאב בנימין "בני" בגין; born 1 March 1943), is an Israeli geologist and politician, having previously served as a member of the Knesset for Likud and Herut – The National Movement. He is the son of former Prime Minister of Israel Menachem Begin.

== Biography ==
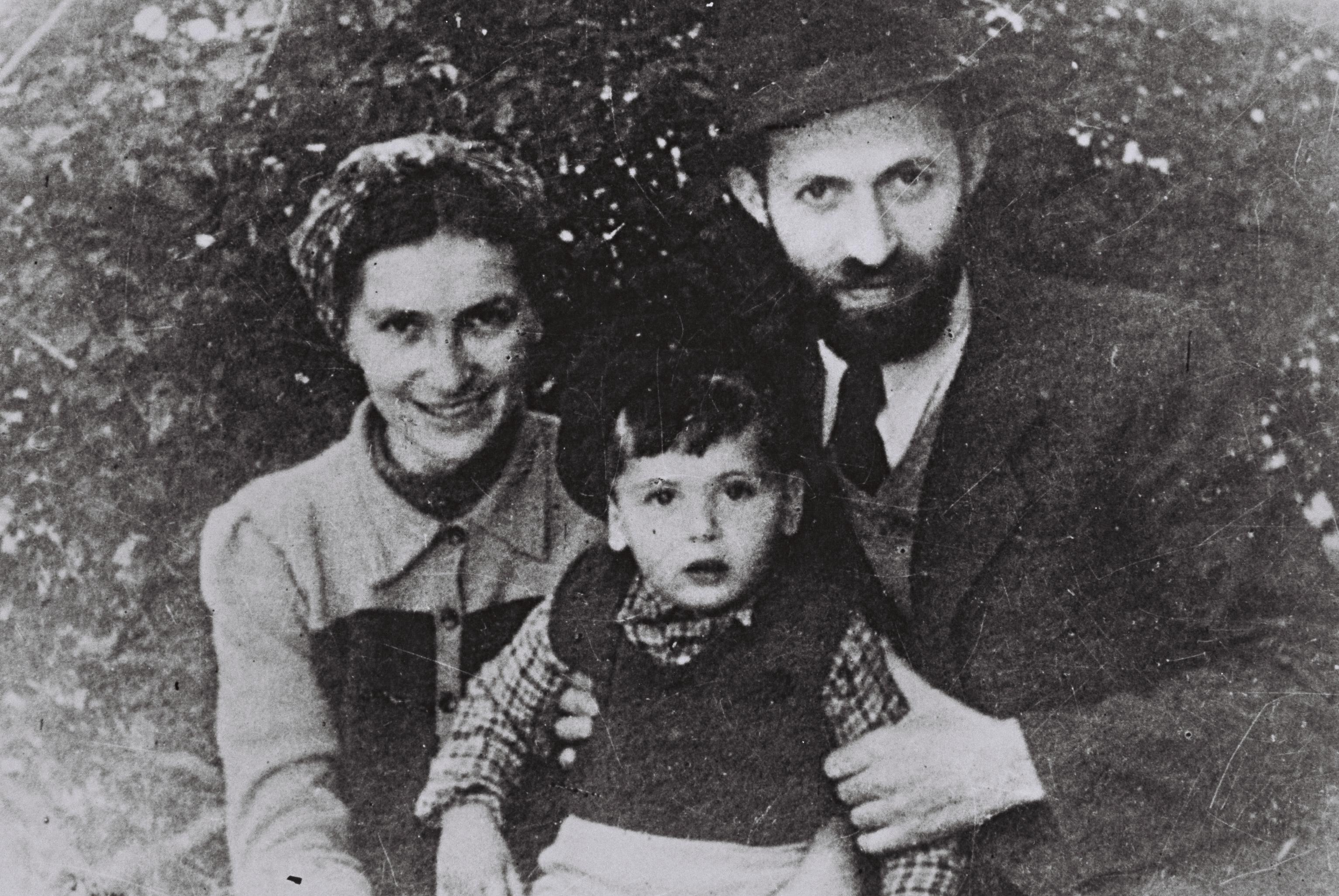
Benny Begin in his childhood with his parents, when his father was commander of the Irgun and disguised himself as a rabbi

Benny Begin was born in Jerusalem to Aliza (née Arnold) and Menachem Begin, who would later become Prime Minister of Israel. At the time of his birth, his father was a soldier in Anders' Army and shortly thereafter went underground, becoming the commander of the Irgun. The family moved frequently to disguise the identity of the family's patriarch.

Begin completed his high school education at Ironi He in Tel Aviv. From 1960 to 1962, he served in the IDF in the Israeli Armored Corps. He returned to active service between 1975 and 1976. He studied Geology at the Hebrew University of Jerusalem and received his MSc in the field. In 1978, he earned his PhD from Colorado State University in the United States. For most of his career as a geologist, he worked at the Geological Survey of Israel.

=== Political activity ===
Begin began his political career in the mid-1980s at the Jerusalem branch of the Herut movement and at the national conference of the movement.

Ahead of the 1988 elections for the 12th Knesset, in June 1988, he submitted his candidacy in the primary elections of the Herut movement. He won third place and was placed 13th on the Likud list. Begin was elected to the 12th Knesset as a member of Likud and served on the Foreign Affairs and Defense Committee, the Constitution, Law and Justice Committee, and the Ethics Committee.

He was re-elected to the 13th Knesset in 1992, placed seventh on the Likud list, and continued to serve on the Foreign Affairs and Defense Committee. In March 1993, during the 1993 Likud leadership election, the first open election (for party members) for the leadership of Likud, Begin ran against Benjamin Netanyahu, David Levy, and Moshe Katsav. The election campaign was intense, and in the end, Netanyahu won by a large margin (52%), followed by Levy (with 26% of the votes), Begin (with 16%), and Katsav (6%).

Begin was one of the prominent opponents of the Oslo Accords, consistently arguing that it was a deception by Yasser Arafat. However, he distanced himself from the delegitimisation of Yitzhak Rabin by the right-wing after the agreement was signed.

==== Minister in Netanyahu's first government ====
Following the 14th Knesset elections and the Likud's rise to power (where he was again placed seventh on the list, though fifth among Likud members in the Likud-Gesher-Tzomet joint list), led by Netanyahu, he was elected to the Knesset and appointed Minister of Science in the 27th Israeli Government.

On 10 January 1997, despite his closeness to Roni Bar-On, Begin was the only minister to vote against his appointment as Attorney General of Israel, arguing that he was unfit for the position. This appointment later led to the Bar-On–Hebron affair.

On 16 January 1997, following the government's decision to approve the Hebron Protocol, Begin resigned from the government. After a series of ideological clashes with Benjamin Netanyahu, head of Likud and Prime Minister of Israel, in November 1997, Begin called for Netanyahu's replacement as leader of Likud, warning that if Likud did not replace its leader in time, it would face severe electoral failure in the next elections. He further stated that if there was another withdrawal as part of the second stage of the Hebron agreement, he would work to topple the government.

After the approval of the Wye River Memorandum in October 1998, Begin left Likud and established a new faction called Herut – The National Movement together with Michael Kleiner and David Ream.

In the elections for the 15th Knesset (May 1999), "Herut" ran as part of a joint list called National Union with "Tekuma" and "Moledet." Begin decided to run for prime minister despite the opposition of Rehavam Ze'evi from "Moledet", but withdrew before the elections after Yitzhak Mordechai withdrew his candidacy. Due to the small number of seats his faction received, Begin retired from political life, stating that he remained "a public servant without a public."

Begin continued to publish articles on current affairs. On 4 September 2002, he published an article in Haaretz featuring a collection of quotes from Palestinian leaders, which he claimed demonstrated that the Oslo Accords were a deception by the Palestinian side.

==== Minister in Netanyahu's second government ====
After leaving political life, Begin returned to work in Geology and, in mid-2005, was appointed head of the Geological Survey of Israel. In this role, he was involved in promoting a project to extract oil from oil shale in the Elah Valley.

On 2 November 2008, Begin informed the Minister of National Infrastructures, Binyamin Ben-Eliezer, that he was resigning from his position at the Geological Survey, following his decision to return to political life and run for a spot on the Likud list for the 18th Knesset. On 4 November 2008, Begin held a joint press conference with Likud chairman Benjamin Netanyahu, formally announcing his candidacy for the Likud primaries for the 18th Knesset. In these primaries, he won 30,918 votes (about 63.8%) and was placed 5th on the list. He was elected to the 18th Knesset and appointed Minister Without Portfolio in the 32nd Government of Israel, serving as a member of the security cabinet and the "Octet" under Prime Minister Netanyahu. In this role, Begin angered some right-wing supporters when he, along with his friend, Minister Dan Meridor, opposed bills he viewed as infringing on minority rights, imposing restrictions on left-wing organizations, and limiting freedom of speech. Begin also supported the settlement freeze in the West Bank, which the government decided on under U.S. pressure.

In November 2012, he ran in the Likud primaries ahead of the 19th Knesset elections.

==== Return to political life ====
In January 2015, Begin resumed activity in the Likud party and was elected to the 20th Knesset after being reserved for the 11th spot on the Likud list by party leader Benjamin Netanyahu. With the formation of the 34th Government of Israel in May 2015, Begin was appointed as a Minister Without Portfolio, but he resigned two weeks later following Gilad Erdan’s return to the government, resuming his role as a Knesset member. Begin was the senior Knesset member in the 20th Knesset.

He served on the Constitution, Law, and Justice Committee and the Committee for the Advancement of Women and Gender Equality. He was also a member of the Interior and Environmental Protection Committee but was removed in November 2017 due to his opposition to a bill proposed by committee chairman Dudi Amsalem to prohibit the police from publishing recommendations regarding indictments for public officials, including a prime minister already under investigation.

Begin strongly opposed the Settlement Regulation Law, arguing that it contradicted international law, would damage Israel's standing globally, and endanger Israeli settlements in the West Bank. Begin was one of two coalition members who voted against the law.

Begin abstained from voting on the Nation-State Bill, arguing that it "undermines the principle of equality and the Jewish State." Begin attempted to promote an alternative version of the law, supported by the Yesh Atid party, which guaranteed equal rights for Israeli Arab citizens. After the law was passed, he proposed an amendment that was not accepted.

In the elections for the 21st Knesset, he did not run in the Likud primaries and was not included on the party's list. Ahead of the elections for the 22nd and 23rd Knesset, he announced that he would not vote for Likud.

On 21 January 2021, ahead of the elections for the 24th Knesset, Begin joined the New Hope party led by Gideon Sa'ar. He was placed sixth on its list and was elected to the Knesset. In the 24th Knesset, as in the 20th Knesset, Begin was the elder statesman of the Knesset.

Ahead of the elections for the 25th Knesset, Begin announced his retirement from political life. In the elections for the 25th Knesset, he was placed in the symbolic 120th spot on the National Unity list.

Ahead of the 2026 elections, Begin appealed to Likud voters to support other parties that can create a change of government and put an end to the Netanyahu administration.

== Family ==
Begin is the son of Menachem Begin, the 6th Prime Minister, and Aliza Begin. He is married to Ruth (née Shuar), whom he met during his military service, and they have six children. One of them, Major Yonatan Begin, an F-16 pilot in the Israeli Air Force, died in a training accident on 27 March 2000. Another son, Avinadav Begin, is an artist, author, and social activist, active in the struggle against the West Bank Barrier.

He resides in the Yafe Nof neighborhood of Jerusalem, where his father, Menachem Begin, also lived following his resignation as Prime Minister of Israel.

== Books ==
- Lines of Confrontation, Yedioth Ahronoth Publishing, 1993 – A collection of articles published between 1988 and 1992, released ahead of his campaign for the Likud leadership.
- A Sad Story, Yedioth Ahronoth Publishing, 2000 – A collection of articles published between 1993 and 1999.
- Because We Will Not See Azekah, Yad Yitzhak Ben-Zvi Publishing, 2000 – About the Lachish Letters.
