= Dov Elbaum =

Israeli writer, journalist, and philosopher

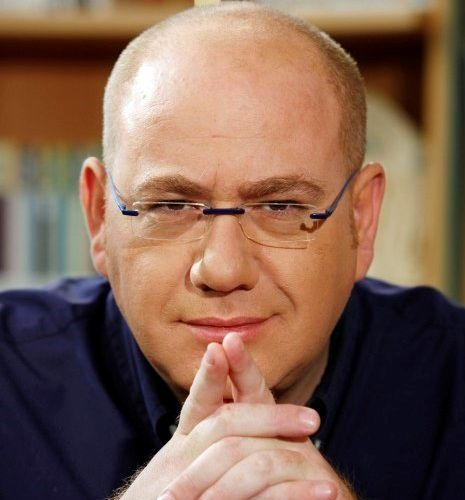
Dov Elbaum

Dov Elbaum (Hebrew: דב אלבוים; born on 21 December 1970) is an Israeli writer, editor, journalist, television host and Jewish philosophy lecturer.

== Biography ==
Dov Elbaum was born in Jerusalem's Mea She'arim neighborhood to an ultra-Orthodox Jewish family. Elbaum is a fifth-generation scion of Rabbi Yosef Chaim Sonnenfeld. He grew up in Ramat Eshkol. He studied at the ultra-Orthodox Hebron Yeshiva but left the yeshiva and religion after realizing that he did not want to live with the restrictions and isolation from society imposed by the yeshiva's brand of Orthodoxy. After his renunciation of a religious lifestyle, his father cut off contact with him for ten years. He served in the Israel Defense Forces as a journalist for Bamahane, the IDF's weekly magazine. He studied at the Adi Lautman Interdisciplinary Program for Outstanding Students of Tel Aviv University, where he earned an interdisciplinary BA in Philosophy, Kabbalah and Hassidism, and an MA with a research focus on Rabbi Nachman of Breslov.

Elbaum is married to Carmit, has four daughters and lives in Kokhav Yair.

== Journalism and media career ==
From 1993-2000, Elbaum wrote extensively for two newspapers, Hadashaot and Yediot Ahronot. In 2006, he served as editor-in-chief of Yediot Ahronot Publishers and edited the publisher's flagship project People of the Book, a series celebrating Israel's 60th anniversary. He has edited works by Martin Buber, Gershom Scholem and others. Elbaum left Yediot Ahronot Publishers to spend more time writing. He is the author of three novels, Zman Elul (1997; 2003), My Life with the Ancestors (2001) and Into the Fullness of the Void (2007;2009). he has also written three children's books and numerous essays.

Elbaum wrote the script for the weekly television show Parashat Hashavua (Weekly Torah portion) hosted by Gil Kopatch on channel 1 in 1997. Two years later he wrote the script for the film Zakota, which was broadcast as part of the Wolgin competition at the Jerusalem Film Festival, and aired numerous times on channel 2. This script won first prize of the Council of Culture and Arts of the Ministry of Education. Between 2001-2005 Elbaum conducted over 700 interviews in the award-winning program, Hotzeh Israel (Crossing Israel). Later on Elbaum edited and hosted the documentary TV show Osim Derech (Making Way) on channel 2, which discussed scientists who had won the Israel Price in recent years. Since 2007 Elbaum has been discussing the weekly Torah portion on his TV show Mekablim Shabbat (Receiving Shabbat) on channel 1, hosting every week different guests (academics, intellectuals, musicians and artists) whose life or field of interest is related to the portion.

== Academic career ==
Elbaum has taught at Tel Aviv University, Open University of Israel and Alma College (Tel Aviv). He was author-in-residence and lecturer at the literature department of Ben Gurion University of the Negev. Elbaum is a research fellow at the Shalom Hartman Institute. In 2006, Elbaum established the Secular Yeshiva in southern Tel Aviv in collaboration with BINA Center for Jewish Identity and Hebrew Culture. The curriculum focuses on intensive study of Jewish texts, from the Bible and Gemara to classic Israeli literature and Zionist history. Elbaum teaches a class on Hasidism and Kabbalah at the yeshiva as well as the BINA Center of the Kibbutz Movement in Ramat Efal.

== Awards and recognition ==
Elbaum was awarded the Israel President's Prize for Young Writers and is the 2013 recipient of the Liebhaber Prize for the Promotion of Religious Tolerance and Cultural Pluralism.

== Published works ==
- 2003: Elul Term. (1997; 2003) Tel Aviv: Am Oved. During the month of Elul, two weeks before Yom Kippur, when Jewish tradition maintains that God judges man for his sins, Nachman undertakes a regime of penance. He vows himself to silence and later gives up eating and sleeping, devoting himself to sacred study and thoughts of repentance. The purification he longs for confronts a repulsive reality, suffocating, fanatical and fraught with superstition. Elbaum describes the yeshiva world during the seventies and eighties in Jerusalem in a unique language derived from the orthodox Jewish slang. This book was crowned with wonderful reviews and paved Elbaum his literary path within the Israeli society.
- 2001: My Life with the Ancestors. Tel Aviv: Am Oved. An autobiographical fantasy which locates the biblical forefathers in modern Israel. This book was awarded the President's Prize for Young Writers in 2002. "It is a carefully written, friendly novel that one could read without intermission. The story might easily extract loud laughter, move one to tears, and fill the heart with sympathy for the narrator and the three lost souls who unfold before our eyes" (a review by Avirama Golan in Ha'Aretz newspaper, 9 May 2001).
- 2006: The Lion, his Mane and the Giraffe. Tel Aviv: Am Oved. A humorous children's book, carrying hidden autobiographical elements, which presents the relationship between a giraffe and a lion after the latter has shaved off his mane. It is a story on a true friendship, changes and personal identity.
- 2008: The Octopus and the Sea Horse. Tel Aviv: Am Oved. Children's book on a young octopus with itchy tentacles which get him in trouble, until he finds a friend.
- 2009: Into the Fullness of the Void: A Spiritual Autobiography. (2007; 2013) USA: Jewish Lights Publishers, Tel Aviv: Am Oved. Dov Elbaum grew up in an ultra-Orthodox Jerusalem family, and was a prodigy who seemed destined for greatness in the world of Talmud study. But in his late teens, he abruptly broke away and set off into secular Israeli society. In this fascinating, courageous and compelling autobiography, Elbaum seeks to understand his decision and its consequences. With the structure of Kabbalah as his road map, Elbaum journeys into the deep recesses of his self and his soul. This is an intimate, honest, revealing work, both deeply personal and strikingly universal. The Hebrew edition was a bestseller and sold over 50,000 copies. "Brilliant, courageous and innovative.… Serves as a modern continuation of the literary and scholarly work of Martin Buber [and] follows in the footsteps of Abraham Joshua Heschel's work.… Makes present and internalizes the ancient Kabbalistic perceptions in his personal life [and] creates a renewed understanding—both personal and spiritual—of a Jewish tradition that today non-Jews and non-Israelis worldwide are also fascinated by." (a review by Moshe Idel, Max Cooper Professor of Jewish Thought, Hebrew University, Jerusalem).
- 2012: The Eagle's Island. Tel Aviv: Am Oved. A fairy tale inspired by the story of Rabbi Nachman of Breslov.
