= The Awareness Center =

US nonprofit organization

- Formation: 1999
- Type: Non-profit
- Headquarters: Skokie, Illinois
- Founder and CEO: Vicki Polin
- Website: theawarenesscenter.blogspot.com

The Awareness Center, Inc., also known as the international Jewish Coalition Against Sexual Abuse/Assault, was a nonprofit institution whose stated mission is to end sexual violence in the Jewish community. It was praised and criticized for maintaining an active website whose policy is to identify Jewish clergy and officials as alleged sexual predators, by name, whether or not they had been charged or sued. Critics say the center made unfounded and unsubstantiated accusations.

== History, goals and leadership ==
The Awareness Center was founded by Vicki Polin, a licensed clinical professional counselor, in 2001 and incorporated in 2003. It closed for a time in 2011, but claimed to resume operations in 2013. The website registration was then allowed to lapse. The center's mission statement listed goals such as the development of an international data base and web page, an international speaker's bureau and an educational certification program for rabbis, cantors and other Jewish communal leaders.

In December 2010, the center claimed the support of more than 260 rabbis from around the world.

== Activities ==
The center operated as a volunteer organization. According to its founder, the best way for a victim of sexual abuse to heal is to talk or blog about it.

The organization's brochure indicated that the center provided educational training for survivors groups, community organizations, rabbis, teachers and parents. The center's webpage described involvement in a movement to abolish the statute of limitations for filing civil suit against alleged and convicted sex offenders. It included documents indicating that its executive director and founder has provided testimony on the topic. It included similar documents on a prior iteration of its web page.

== Criticism of the center and its director ==
The Awareness Center drew sharp criticism for publishing and publicizing rumors, accusations and allegations without verification. The center routinely relied on anonymous blogs and other sources of dubious credibility to profile alleged sexual predators. Some who were listed by name were never sued or charged with any offense, or even accused by a verifiable source.

Rabbi Mark Dratch, chair of the Rabbinical Council of America's Task Force on Rabbinic Improprieties and founder of the organization JSafe, which addresses domestic violence and child abuse in the Jewish community, withdrew his support from the center because its use of unreliable sources was victimizing the falsely accused. "I wasn't satisfied with the threshold of verification. There are people who've been victimized and others who've been subject to false reports also being victimized."

Rabbi Avi Shafran, spokesman for the Orthodox Agudath Israel of America group, also criticized the center for using material from anonymous blogs. "The blogorai, as I call it, is the new way of making irresponsible accusations," he said. "Using a blog is a very easy and effective way of casting aspersions on people." Despite his words of general support for the center, Rabbi Yosef Blau agreed, saying "since they are anonymous, they can say almost anything."

Rabbi Tzvi Hersh Weinreb, executive vice president of the Orthodox Union and a trained psychologist, said that while the Awareness Center and the blogs "have served the purpose of keeping this in the public spotlight and keeping the pressure on established institutions to police their constituencies... I read everything with a grain of salt."

Jeff Bell, writing in the July 2008 issue of Catalyst magazine, went further, accusing the center's director of misusing the organization as a tool for defamation:

She now claims to be a victim’s advocate; but her advocacy seems to have taken all the aspects of vigilante misanthrope, and the power of the blog is her weapon. Polin has a singular focus to not only expose, but to destroy the life and reputation of whatever person that falls into her sights, regardless of facts. Any Google search on her name serves up a fairly even return of Polin's attacks on rabbinical leaders, and pages written by victims of Polin's tactics.

=== Appearance on The Oprah Winfrey Show ===
In 1989, before founding the center, Polin was a guest on The Oprah Winfrey Show. Appearing under a pseudonym, she claimed that she was a survivor of a secret, Jewish Satanic cult, in which she, her family, and others had sacrificed babies to the devil.

The Anti-Defamation League (ADL) and a host of other Jewish organizations sharply criticized Winfrey for publicizing an obviously false blood libel and thereby helping to perpetuate anti-Semitism. Rabbi David Saperstein of the Religious Action Center of Reform Judaism criticized Winfrey in the New York Times for "insensitive manipulation" of someone who was "clearly mentally ill." He said the result "can only inflame the basest prejudices of ignorant people." Footage of the video has been posted to YouTube and used by anti-Semitic websites to "prove" the existence of Jewish Satanic cults.

In 2009, Polin addressed the controversy directly:

I have never made it a secret that I am a survivor of child sexual abuse, nor have I hidden the fact that I appeared on several television and radio shows back in the 1980s sharing my story in hopes of reaching out to other survivors and educating the general public about the issues and ramifications child abuse plays on its victims.
Back on May 1, 1989, I appeared on the Oprah Show. I shared the fact that I am a survivor of ritual abuse. The truth is that Oprah originally agreed not to mention that I was Jewish, yet it slipped out. What outraged me the most was not the mistake Oprah made, yet the reaction from the Jewish world that I would speak my truth -- that I would share the fact that Jews also abuse their children at the same rate as those who are non-Jewish.

She concluded, "I am sick and tired of the games being played by those in the Jewish Orthodox world who are attempting to discredit myself and The Awareness Center. Their hope is to continue to silence those who deserve to have their voices heard. It's important for us all to become educated consumers, and for the truth to be made public so we can learn, heal, and grow."

She also accused her critics of partiality.

== See also ==
- Takana
