= Yair Sprinzak =

Israeli scientist and politician

- יאיר שפרינצק

Faction represented in the Knesset
- 1988–1992: Moledet

Personal details
- Born: 8 November 1911 Tel Aviv, Ottoman Empire
- Died: 6 September 1999 (aged 87)

Professor Yair Sprinzak (Hebrew: יאיר שפרינצק; 8 November 1911 – 6 September 1999) was an Israeli scientist and politician who served as a Knesset for Moledet between 1988 and 1992.

== Biography ==
Born in Tel Aviv during the Ottoman era, Sprinzak went to high school in Jerusalem and studied chemistry at the University of Brussels. He worked as a senior researcher in the organic chemistry department at the Weizmann Institute before becoming a professor at Tel Aviv University. He was particularly involved in work on desalinisation.

=== Political career ===
His father, Yosef Sprinzak, was a politician in the early days of the state, and was a member of the Knesset for the left-wing Mapai, as well as being the first Knesset speaker.

In contrast, Yair became involved in right-wing politics, joining the Movement for Greater Israel and becoming a member of its directorate. He was active in the Tehiya party, and was one of the founders of Moledet in 1988. In the same year he was elected to the Knesset on Moledet's list. Having been elected at the age of 76, Sprinzak was at the time the oldest person ever elected to the Knesset for the first time. This record was broken by Rafi Eitan, who was elected at the age of 79 in the 2006 election.

As the eldest member of Knesset, Sprinzak also served temporarily as Speaker of the Knesset until a permanent replacement could be elected. Because of his hawkish views, a number of Knesset members refused to appear during his tenure. However, he lost his seat in the 1992 election.

He died in 1999 at the age of 87.
