= Binyamin Elon =

Israeli rabbi and politician (1954–2017)

- בנימין אלון
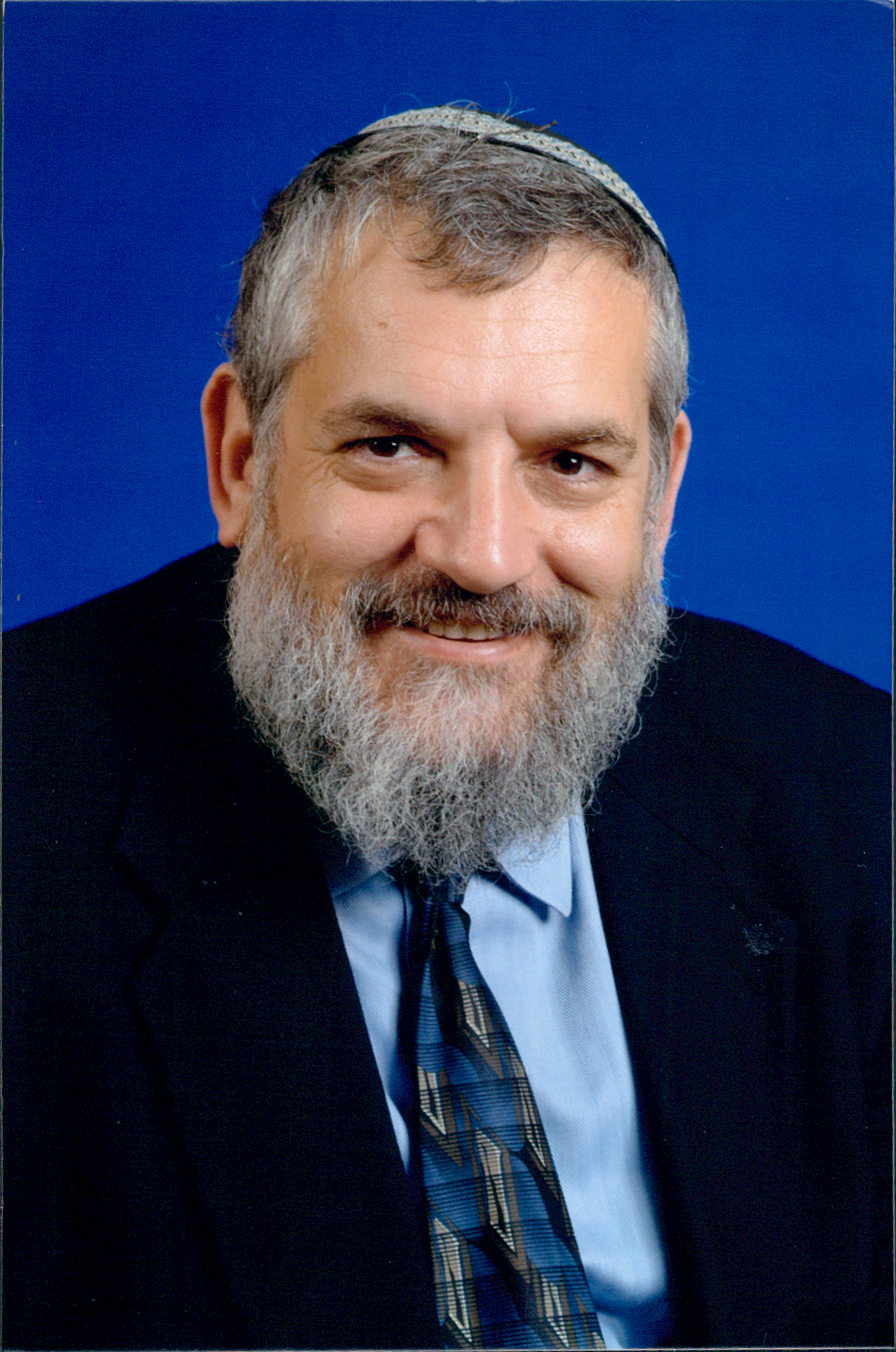

Ministerial roles
- 2001–2002: Minister of Tourism
- 2003–2004: Minister of Tourism

Faction represented in the Knesset
- 1996–1999: Moledet
- 1999–2009: National Union
- Born: 10 November 1954; Jerusalem, Israel
- Died: 5 May 2017 (aged 62); Jerusalem, Israel
- Spouse: Emuna Elon
- Father: Menachem Elon
- Relatives: Mordechai Elon (brother); Ari Elon (brother); Ori Elon (son)

Rabbi Binyamin "Benny" Elon (Hebrew: בנימין אלון; 10 November 1954 – 5 May 2017) was an Israeli Orthodox rabbi and politician who served as a member of the Knesset for Moledet and the National Union between 1996 and 2009. A ninth-generation Jerusalemite, Elon lived in Beit El, an Israeli settlement in the West Bank, for over twenty years, and was married to author and journalist Emuna Elon. They had six children. His father, Menachem Elon, was the former Deputy Chief Justice of Israel. His brother, disgraced Rabbi Mordechai Elon, has been a prominent controversial figure in the Religious Zionist Movement.

== Biography ==
Born in Jerusalem, Elon studied at Mercaz HaRav Yeshiva, and Kollel HaIdra in the Golan Heights, before being ordained as a rabbi in 1978. Together with Hanan Porat, he founded the Beit Orot Talmudic College, and Elon became its first dean.

He was first elected to the Knesset in 1996 as a member of the right-wing Moledet Party, advocating "voluntary" transfer of the Palestinian population from the West Bank and the Gaza Strip, an ideology shared by Elon. In 1998, he led a group of religious students in taking over a compound in Sheikh Jarrah, which spurred the government to start subsidizing illegal settlements there. In 1999, he again tried to take over a compound in Sheikh Jarrah. His efforts were unsuccessful and a court ruled in favor of the Abu Jibna family who owned it.

In 1999, the party allied with other right-wing parties to form the National Union party. Following the assassination of Moledet leader Rehavam Ze'evi in 2001, Elon was elected to replace him as party chairman and as Tourism Minister. He consequently served two terms as Minister of Tourism, between 2001 and 2002, and again between 2003 and 2004, both in Ariel Sharon's government. During his second spell in the cabinet, Elon attempted to foil Ariel Sharon's plan to dismiss him from the cabinet for intending to vote against the disengagement plan by going into hiding, claiming if he did not receive his dismissal in person within 48 hours of the cabinet meeting, then he would still be able to vote. Ultimately, his dismissal was deemed legal, and he was not allowed to vote in the meeting. He was re-elected in 2006, but did not run in the 2009 elections due to health issues.

== Ideology ==
Elon was a keen supporter of the continuation of the Israeli settlement enterprise in the West Bank and wanted to rebuild the Gaza settlements. He did not recognize a Palestinian right for self-determination in any part of Eretz Israel ("Land of Israel"), the area which he stated God gave to the Jews according to the Hebrew Bible. As such, he rejected mainstream efforts for establishing peace in the Middle East (see Road map for peace). Instead, he suggested an alternative proposal called The Right Road to Peace, also known as the Elon Peace Plan. The plan would have Israel annex Gaza and the West Bank Jordan a "voluntary" transfer of the Palestinian population to neighboring countries would occur, primarily with Jordan as the destination. Those who refused would become stateless.

== Additional work ==
He was the author of God's Covenant with Israel: Establishing Biblical Boundaries in Today's World (2005).

As Minister of Tourism, Benny Elon reached out to the Christian world when Jewish–Christian relations were still very strained. He served as the Chairman of the Knesset Christian Allies Caucus in the Israeli Parliament, growing its influence and connections. Benny traveled extensively, meeting with Members of Parliament, Pastors, faith leaders, and House Representatives and Senators. In 2006, the Congressional Israel Allies Caucus was established in the U.S. House of Representatives which has been chaired by Vice President Mike Pence, former Rep. Dave Weldon, Rep. Eliot Engel, Rep. Trent Franks, and others. The work of the Congressional Israel Allies Caucus and the Knesset Christian Allies Caucus led to the establishment of 34 additional caucuses in nations worldwide, and in 2007, Rabbi Elon founded the Israel Allies Foundation to resource, educate, and encourage the pro-Israel initiatives of this international parliamentary network.

Elon maintained close contacts with Christians worldwide, including radio personality Janet Parshall, former House Majority Leader Tom DeLay, the Christian Coalition of America, Pat Robertson, Hungarian Pastor Sandor Nemeth, and others.

== Death ==
In February 2006 Elon was diagnosed with throat cancer. He was treated, but it was never cured, and he retired in 2008 due to related health problems. After eleven years, he died from the condition on May 5, 2017.

== See also ==
- Beit Orot
