= Emuna Elon =

Israeli author, journalist, and women's rights activist

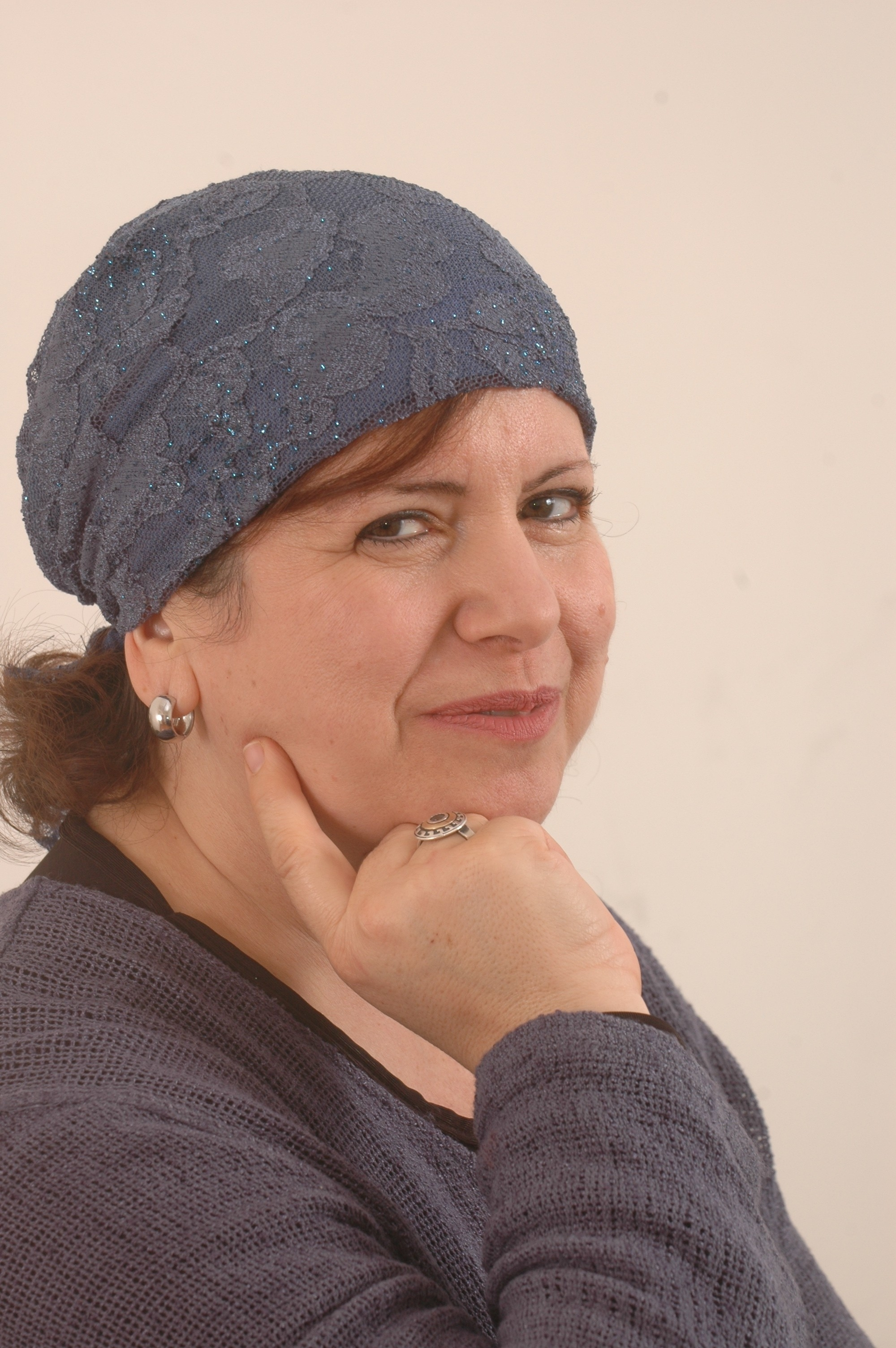
- Born: אמונה אלון; 28 April 1955 (age 71); Jerusalem, Israel
- Occupations: Writer; novelist; journalist
- Spouse: Binyamin Elon
- Children: Ori Elon
- Writing career
- Notable awards: Prime Minister's Prize for Hebrew Literary Works (2015)

Emuna Elon (Hebrew: אמונה אלון; born 1955) is an Israeli author, journalist, and women's rights activist.

== Biography ==
Emuna Elon was born in 1955 in Jerusalem, the daughter of rabbi and professor Pinchas Hacohen Peli and his wife Pnina. She was raised in Jerusalem and New York City. While in New York, Elon attended the High School of Music and Art, in New York City. She lived for many years in the Israeli settlement of Beit El, and then in Rehavia neighborhood of Jerusalem. She was married to Binyamin Elon, a rabbi and former Knesset member, and is the mother of six children, One of her sons, Ori Elon, is a writer and filmmaker.

She teaches Judaism, Hassidism and Hebrew literature, and has served as advisor to the Prime Minister on the status of Israeli women. From 1991 to 2005, she wrote a column in Yedioth Ahronoth, Israel's largest newspaper, where she advocated the separation of Judaism and politics, and later she wrote a column in Israel Hayom.

She has written novels for adults and children, as well as non-fiction books. Some of her novels have been translated into English. If You Awaken Love, her first novel translated into English, was a finalist for the 2007 National Jewish Book Award).

== Selected books ==
- Leftsock, 2007 (children's novel)
- If You Awaken Love, London/New Milford, AmazonCrossing, 2007
- Beyond My Sight, Kinneret, Zmora-Bitan, 2012
- Only When I Close My Eyes, Kinneret, Zmora-Bitan, 2015
- House on Many Waters, Kinneret, Zmora-Bitan, 2016
- Sonja's Zoom, Amsterdam/Antwerpen, Uitgeverij Atlas Contact, 2018
