= Herut – The National Movement =

Herut – The National Movement חרות – התנועה הלאומית
- Leader: Michael Kleiner; Benny Begin
- Founded: 23 February 1999
- Dissolved: 2009
- Split from: Likud
- Merged into: Likud
- Headquarters: Tel Aviv
- Ideology: Revisionist Zionism
- Political position: Right-wing to far-right
- Alliance: National Union (1999–2000)
- Most MKs: 3 (1999)
- Fewest MKs: 1 (1999–2003)

Election symbol
- נץ

Website
- herut.org.il

Herut – The National Movement (Hebrew: חרות – התנועה הלאומית, Herut – HaTnu'a HaLeumit), commonly known as just Herut (חרות), was a minor revisionist Zionist political party in Israel. Though it saw itself as the ideological successor to the historical Herut party (which merged into Likud) it was a new and separate party. It participated in the 1999, 2003 and 2006 elections. This party is also referred to as New Herut to distinguish it from the previous Herut.

== History ==
The party was formed on 23 February 1999 when Benny Begin, Michael Kleiner and David Re'em broke away from Likud during the fourteenth Knesset. The breakaway was the result of disagreements with Likud leader Benjamin Netanyahu over the Wye River Memorandum and the Hebron Agreement, which had ceded land to the Palestinians. Though not an MK at the time, former Prime Minister and Herut leader Yitzhak Shamir backed the new party.

Herut participated in the 1999 elections as part of the National Union, a right-wing alliance of itself, Moledet and Tkuma with Begin at its head. In the simultaneous election for Prime Minister, Begin had originally planned to stand, but dropped out three days before the election to avoid splitting the right-wing vote between himself and Netanyahu (though it didn't help, as Netanyahu lost to Ehud Barak by more than 12%). In the Knesset election, the National Union won only 3% of the vote and four seats. The party's poor performance led to Begin resigning as head of the party and retiring from politics before the Knesset term began, and Herut's one allocated seat was taken by Kleiner.

On 1 February 2000, Kleiner pulled out of the National Union, establishing Herut as an independent party in the Knesset. In the 2003 elections the party ran without the National Union and joined forces with the small Yamin Yisrael party. It chose the ballot letters נץ, meaning "hawk", and used the slogan "the 'hawkiest' on the right". Kleiner led the list, with Baruch Marzel, a former member of the outlawed Kach party taking second place. The party won 36,202 votes, though it was only 1.1% of the total, and not enough to pass the 1.5% electoral threshold. Soon after Marzel left to found his own party, the Jewish National Front.

Herut participated in the 2006 elections, again with the letters נץ. This time Kleiner was joined by veteran activists Elie Yossef and Israel Cohen. The main campaign message was "Evacuate-Compensate the Palestinians" (Hebrew: פיצוי-פינוי לפלסטינים, Pitzui-Pinui laFalestinim). Yana Chudriker, an immigrant from Ukraine and beauty queen of Israel (1993) was assigned number 4 on the party list. The campaign presented Chudriker wearing a burqa as a warning against the demographic threat of Arabs to Israel and the slogan was "The Demographics Will Poison Us" (in Hebrew the words "poison" (ra'al, רעל) and "burqa" (r'ala, רעלה) sound similar). The poster's publication resulted in Attorney General Menachem Mazuz ordering the police to investigate the party for inciting racism. The party's television campaign also drew criticism, and segments were removed by the Central election committee. Committee chairman and Supreme Court Judge Dorit Beinisch asserted that the removed segment from the advertisement clearly made reference to a blatantly racist slogan and retorted that if aired, would most probably hurt the feelings of the Arab population. In the election itself, the party won just 2,387 votes—0.07%, well below the new electoral threshold of 2%.

Prior to the 2009 elections, Kleiner and Begin rejoined the Likud slate. Herut did not run in the 2009 elections or subsequently and is considered defunct.
