= Academic Center for Law and Science =

College in Hod HaSharon, Israel

Coordinates: 32°9′20.37″N 34°54′2.52″E

The Academic Center for Law and Science
- המרכז האקדמי שערי מדע ומשפט
- Former names: Sha'arei Mishpat College, Sha'arei Mishpat Academic Center
- Type: Private
- Established: 1995
- President: Professor Aviad Hacohen
- Location: Hod HaSharon, Israel
- Website: www.mishpat.ac.il

The Academic Center for Law and Science (Hebrew: המרכז האקדמי שערי מדע ומשפט), previously Sha'arei Mishpat Academic Center and earlier Sha'arei Mishpat College is a private college in Hod HaSharon, Israel. It was established in 1995. Justice Prof. Menachem Elon was its founder and president for the first eight years of its existence.

The Academic Center of Law and Science offers undergraduate (LLB) and graduate (LLM) degrees in Law, and undergraduate degrees (BA) in accounting; Public administration, government and Law (BA); and administration of health systems.

== Law school ==
The head of the School of Law is Professor Aviad Hacohen, who from October 2017 serves as the Academic Center's president.

== Legal clinics ==
The Law School legal clinics provide the students with practical experience, combined with theoretical background. The clinics are held as a year-long course, and entitle participants to receive study credits. Participants deal with the following issues:

1. Legal Assistance and Practice: Students work in community centers which assist those of limited means. Assistance is given in civil law issues such as contracts and small claims.
2. Enforcement of Debts: Students work in Execution of Judgments Office, assisting both debtors and judgment creditors.
3. Assistance to Bereaved Families, Disabled Veterans and Victims of Hostilities: Students collaborating with relevant aid organizations, assisting those seeking legal information and help.
4. The Rights of Persons with Special Needs: Students assist persons with special needs in a variety of fields including welfare, health, education, national insurance, housing, accessibility, etc.
5. Environmental Law: Students collaborate with environmental organizations and legal divisions of local authorities.
6. The Hotline for Governmental Integrity: Students deal with information received from the public regarding allegations of governmental corruption and improper administration.
7. Representation of Criminal Defendants, Suspects & Prisoners: Students collaborate with the Public Defender's Office, taking part in court sessions, jail visits etc.
8. Urban Renewal Clinic: Enables the students to thoroughly study and apply the Urban Renewal Plan 38 on reinforcement and reconstruction.
9. Assistance to Victims of Sexual crimes: This clinic comprises a thorough study of the theory and practice of sexual assault and its implications.

== Law reviews ==
The law school publishes two law reviews in Hebrew: "Sha'arei Mishpat" ("Gates of Law") and "Mishpacha Bamishpat" (Family in the Law").

== School of Accounting ==
The Head of School of Accounting is Professor Nissim Aranya.

== Interdisciplinary School of Administration, Governance and Law ==
The head of the Interdisciplinary School of Administration, Governance and Law is Professor Avi Diskin.

== School of Health Sciences ==
The head of the School of Health Sciences is Professor Benjamin Sredni.

== See also ==
- List of universities and colleges in Israel
