= Yamin Yisrael =

Yamin Yisrael ימין ישראל
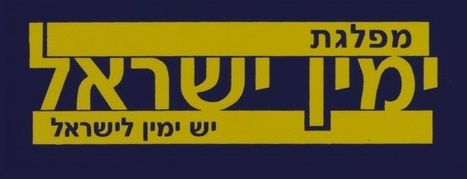
- Leader: Shaul Gutman; Miriam Lapid; Eleonora Shifrin
- Founded: 24 July 1995
- Split from: Moledet
- Ideology: Zionism; Nationalism
- Political position: Right-wing
- Most MKs: 1 (1995–96)

Election symbol
- יד

Yamin Yisrael (Hebrew: ימין ישראל, lit. 'Right Israel') was a minor right-wing political party in Israel.

== Background ==
The party was founded on 24 July 1995 when Shaul Gutman broke away from Moledet. It ran in the 1996 elections, but failed to cross the electoral threshold of 1.5% and did not win a seat.

In the 2003 elections the party ran a joint list with Herut – The National Movement. Although together the parties won 36,202 votes (1.1%), they were 8,000 short of the threshold. For the 2006 elections the party ran alongside Baruch Marzel's Jewish National Front, winning 28,824 votes (0.79%) and again failing to cross the threshold.

The party did not run in the 2009 elections.

== Ideology ==
The party's objectives were to:

- Replace the current proportional representation system for elections with a constituency-based method.
- Institute a presidential system of government.
- Presidential appointment of Supreme Court judges.
- Enforce the basic law prohibiting parties that negate the Jewish nature of the state
- Rescind citizenship of "disloyal" citizens.
- Rescind large child allowances.
- Rescind the "grandfather clause" of the Law of Return (which allows individuals with a Jewish grandparent, but not recognised halakhically as Jews to claim Israeli citizenship).
- Allow Israelis living abroad to vote.
- Castigate CNN and the BBC for being "a facade for antisemitism".
- Phase out U.S. military aid to Israel.
