= Takana =

Israeli non-profit organization

- Formation: 2003
- Type: Non-profit
- Headquarters: Israel
- Website: takana.org.il

Takana is a forum of prominent personalities with the objective of fighting sexual abuse in the National Religious sector in Israel.

The forum came to the spotlight in February 2010 when it published a statement claiming that Rabbi Mordechai Elon was breaking his commitments to refrain from public activity, which followed complaints of sexual misconduct.

In 2008, the forum was involved in the Makor Rishon exposé of Megirot and its founder, Sylvia Dahari.

== Criticism ==
The forum has been criticized for allowing the religious community to settle matters "in-house" rather than have alleged offenders subject to open public investigation.
