= Moledet =

Defunct right-wing political party in Israel

Moledet מולדת
- Leader: Rehavam Ze'evi (1988–2001); Binyamin Elon (2001–2008); Uri Bank (2008–2013)
- Founded: 1988
- Dissolved: 2013
- Merged into: Tkuma
- Ideology: Ultranationalism; Anti-Palestinianism; Population transfer Religious Zionism (after 2001)
- Political position: Right-wing to far-right
- National affiliation: National Union (1999–2013)
- Colours: Blue and green
- Most MKs: 3 (1992, 1996)

Election symbol
- ט

Website
- moledet.org.il

Moledet (Hebrew: מולדת, lit. 'Homeland') was a minor right-wing to far-right political party in Israel.

== History ==
Moledet was established by Rehavam Ze'evi in 1988. It won two seats in the Knesset elections later that year, taken by Ze'evi and Yair Sprinzak. It joined Yitzhak Shamir's government in February 1991 and Ze'evi was appointed Minister without Portfolio. However, he resigned from the cabinet on 21 January the following year. In the 1992 elections, the party won three seats, with Yosef Ba-Gad and Shaul Gutman joining Ze'evi in the Knesset. However, Gutman left the party to establish Yamin Yisrael on 27 July 1995, whilst Ba-Gad left to sit as an independent on 12 March 1996.

The party won two seats in the 1996 elections, taken by Ze'evi and Binyamin Elon, and supported Benjamin Netanyahu's government, although it did not join it. On 4 March 1999, the party gained a third MK when Moshe Peled left Tzomet to found Mehora, which he immediately merged into Moledet. Prior to the 1999 elections, the party joined the National Union alliance alongside Herut – The National Movement and Tkuma. The Union won four seats, with two taken by Moledet members Elon and Ze'evi. The alliance joined the government formed by Ariel Sharon on 7 March 2001 after he won the election for Prime Minister, and Ze'evi was appointed Minister of Tourism. However, he was assassinated by the Popular Front for the Liberation of Palestine (PFLP) on 17 October 2001, and his seat taken by Uri Ariel of Tkuma. Elon was elected party leader and assumed Ze'evi's place in the cabinet until 14 March 2002.

Prior to the 2006 elections, the National Union formed an alliance with the National Religious Party, which went on to win nine seats; Moledet again held two seats, taken by Elon and Eldad. On 3 November 2008 the party announced a merger with other members of the National Union, the National Religious Party and Tkuma to form a new right-wing party, later named the Jewish Home. However, the Jewish Home excluded ex-Moledet members from the top slots of the candidate list for the 2009 elections. Moledet then rejected the merger and joined the revived National Union. Although the Union won four seats, the highest place Moledet candidate was fifth-placed Uri Bank, who failed to enter the Knesset.

In the lead up to the 2013 elections, Tkuma merged with the Jewish Home. Bank supported the merger and allowed Tkuma to continue using the letter 'Tet' on the ballot. Bank received #19 on the list and another member Jeremy Saltan received #63.>

== Ideology ==
The party advocated encouraging voluntary population transfer (as opposed to forced transfer) of the Arab population of the West Bank. While other parties, namely Kach and Herut, also advocated transfer, Moledet was the party most associated with the concept in Israel, given the dearth of other elements in its platform and Ze'evi's success in bringing together opposing political elements—both secular and religious—under the transfer flag. Unlike Kach, Moledet advocated only voluntary transfer.

== Party leaders ==
- 1988−2001: Rehavam Ze'evi
- 2001−2008: Binyamin Elon
- 2008−2013: Uri Bank

== Election results ==
Election	Leader	Votes	%	Seats	+/–	Status
1988	Rehavam Ze'evi	44,174	1.93 (#11)	2 / 120	New	Coalition
1992	Rehavam Ze'evi	62,269	2.38 (#8)	3 / 120	▲1	Opposition
1996	Rehavam Ze'evi	72,002	2.36 (#11)	2 / 120	▼1	Coalition
1999	Rehavam Ze'evi	Part of National Union (Note: 1999, got 100,181 or 3.03%) (Note: 2003, got 173,973 or 5.53%) (Note: 2006, got 224,083 or 7.14%) (Note: 2009, got 112,570 or 3.34%)		2 / 120	Steady	Coalition
2003	Binyamin Elon	Part of National Union		2 / 120	Steady	Coalition (2003-2004)
2003	Binyamin Elon	Part of National Union		2 / 120	Steady	Opposition (2004-2006)
2006	Binyamin Elon	Part of National Union		2 / 120	Steady	Opposition
2009	Uri Bank	Part of National Union		0 / 120	▼2	Extra-parliamentary

== See also ==
- Elon Peace Plan
- Kach and Kahane Chai
- Far-right politics in Israel
