= TWA Flight 800 (disambiguation) =

TWA Flight 800 crashed over New York on 17 July 1996 due to a fuel tank explosion.

TWA Flight 800 may also refer to:

- TWA Flight 800 (1964), which crashed in Italy on 24 November 1964 due to an engine failure
- TWA Flight 800 (film), a 2013 television documentary based on the 1996 crash

== See also ==
- Flight 800 (disambiguation)
- TWA Flight 800 conspiracy theories
