= Shifrin =

Shifrin, Shiffrin, Schifrin and Schiffrin (Yiddish: שיפרין shifrin, Russian: Шифрин Šifrín) is an Eastern Ashkenaz Jewish matronymic surname of Yiddish origin. Shifrin derives from the Yiddish female personal שפרה shifre (Shifre), from Hebrew שִׁפְרָה šīp̄ərā, shifrá (Shifra) 'beauty, grace' (see Shiphrah, a Biblical name). It is formed with the Slavic possessive suffix -in. Slavic-type feminine forms of the surname are created by adding the suffix -a: Shifrina, etc. Notable people with the surname include:

- André Schiffrin, French-American author, publisher and socialist
- Anya Schiffrin, American (former) business journalist
- Mikaela Shiffrin, American alpine skier
- Richard Shiffrin, American psychologist
- Seana Shiffrin, American philosopher
- Avraham Shifrin, Soviet-born human rights activist, Zionist, author, lawyer, and Israeli politician
- David Shifrin, American classical clarinetist
- Eduard Shifrin, Ukraine-born billionaire
- Efim Shifrin, Russian actor and comedian
- Eleonora Shifrin, Soviet-born Israeli politician
- Karin Shifrin, Israeli opera singer
- Lalo Schifrin, Argentine-American composer and musician
- Nick Schifrin, American television journalist
- Peter Schifrin, American Olympic fencer and sculptor
- Seymour Shifrin, American composer
