= Flight 800 (disambiguation) =

Flight 800 often refers to TWA Flight 800, which crashed near Long Island, New York, on 17 July 1996.

Flight 800 may also refer to (listed in chronological order):

- TWA Flight 800 (1964), caught fire in Rome, Italy at Rome Fiumicino Airport on 24 November 1964;
- LATAM Airlines Flight 800, suffered an in-flight upset near Auckland, New Zealand, on 11 March 2024.

== See also ==
- TWA Flight 800 (disambiguation)
  - TWA Flight 800 (film), a 2013 television documentary about the 1996 crash
