= Harry Ewing =

Harry or Harold Ewing may refer to:

- Harry Ewing, Baron Ewing of Kirkford (1931–2007), Labour politician from Scotland
- Harry W. Ewing (1886–1962), American football player and coach
- Harold Ewing, see Korean Air Lines Flight 007 alternative theories

== See also ==
- Henry Ewing (disambiguation)
