= Korean Air Lines Flight 007 alternative theories =

Conspiracy theories about the 1983 shootdown

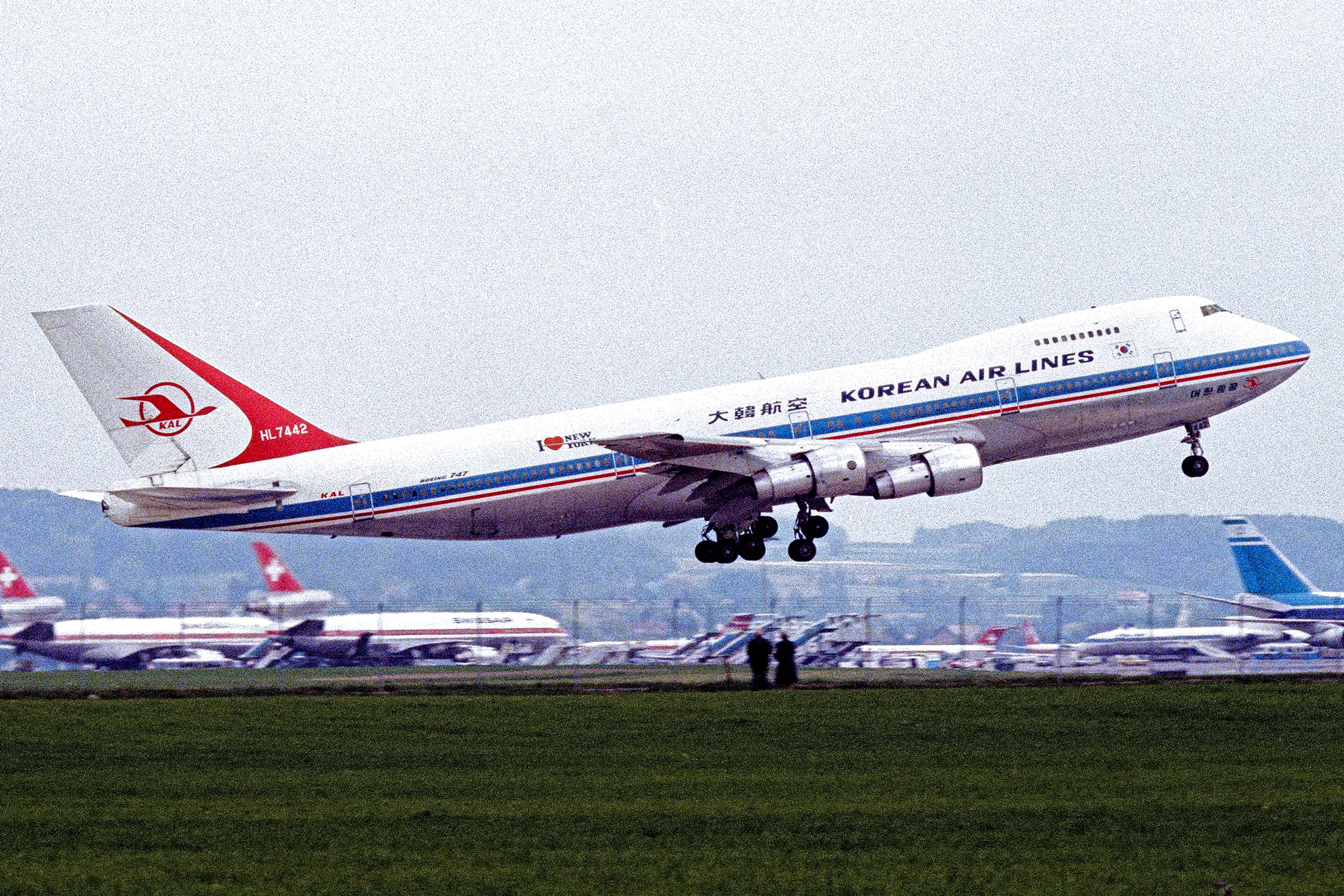
The aircraft involved, departing Zurich Airport in May 1980

Korean Air Lines Flight 007 alternative theories concerns the various theories put forward regarding the shooting down of Korean Air Lines Flight 007. The aircraft was en route from New York City via Anchorage to Seoul on September 1, 1983, when it strayed into prohibited Soviet airspace and was shot down by Soviet fighter jets.

Flight 007 has been the subject of ongoing controversy and has spawned a number of conspiracy theories. Many of these are based on the suppression of evidence such as the flight data recorders, unexplained details such as the role of a United States Air Force (USAF) RC-135 surveillance aircraft, or merely Cold War disinformation and propaganda. Some commentators also felt that the International Civil Aviation Organization (ICAO) report into the incident failed to address key points adequately, such as the reason for the aircraft's deviation. The release of flight data recorder evidence by the Russian Federation in 1993, ten years after the event, seriously challenged many of these theories. Some alternative interpretations focus on evidential questions largely independent of political considerations.

One of the first theories was that Space Shuttle Challenger and a satellite were monitoring the airliner's progress over Soviet territory. Defence Attaché, which printed this claim, was sued by Korean Air Lines and forced to pay damages and print an apology.

== Flight crew awareness of deviation ==
The reasons put forward for the aircraft's deviation range from a lack of situational awareness by the pilots (ICAO), to a planned and intentional deviation (Pearson), to an Inertial Navigation system (INS) programming error by 10 degrees of longitude during the inputting of the ramp starting position by the crew. All accounts note that the pilots had several sources of information that could have alerted them to their increasing deviation from their planned route. The "Harold Ewing" (H/E) scenario additionally suggests the flight's first officer did know they were flying away from the planned course, but the airline's culture discouraged anyone from questioning the captain's conduct of the flight, so he remained silent.

The theory that the INS system was set incorrectly gains considerable credibility if the following are considered:

1. Although there are three independent inertial platforms, when in the ramp position, the operator only inputs one initial position in order for the platform to "erect".
2. This would have been done by the flight engineer alone, before the other crew members arrive.
3. In order to erect properly (that is, enter gyro-compassing mode), each platform relies on the correct latitude, but not the longitude.
4. Therefore, if the longitude was incorrectly set, all three platforms would seem to erect normally, but with a position some 10 degrees in error.

Once airborne, an incorrect aircraft system position (indicating higher latitudes a small amount) would immediately direct all the flight navigational displays to fly the aircraft to what it thinks is the correct track to the first way point. Once on the wrong track, all would appear normal, HSIs included. This would even be true if there were pictorial navigational displays, similar to modern aircraft.

The deviated track can be compared with the required track. As the aircraft moves south, the lines of longitude expand and the track deviation gets greater. That is the initial 10 degree error that was sent to the INS gets wider.

The horizontal situation indicator (HSI): Pearson contends that the HSI's needle could have alerted the pilots of their course deviation. He postulates that the needle of each pilot's HSI, capable of showing deviation only up to 8 nautical miles (15 km), should have been "pegged" all the way to the side. The pilots, thus, could in theory have known that they were at least 8 nautical miles (15 km) off course.

Despite this, at 1349 UTC, the pilots were reporting that they were on course ("007, Bethel at forty niner.") Fifty minutes after takeoff, military radar at King Salmon, Alaska acquired KAL 007 at more than 12.6 nautical miles (23.3 km) off course. The deviation exceeded the expected accuracy of the INS (2 nautical miles (3.7 km) an hour) by a factor of five.

Difficulties in making required reports: Pilot and copilot could also have been aware of the aircraft's serious deviation because now, much more than 12 nautical miles (22 km) off course, KAL 007 was too far off course for the pilots to make their required Very High Frequency (VHF) radio reports, and had to relay these reports via KAL Flight 015, just minutes behind and on course (KAL 007, increasingly off course, relied on KAL 015 three times to relay its reports to Anchorage Air Traffic Control). By being forced to rely on KAL 015 to relay messages, KAL 007 should have (by definition) understood that they were well off course.

At one point in this section of its flight, (1443 UTC) KAL 007 put a call through a navigational "hookup", the International Flight Service Station on HF. Flight 007, now too distant to speak directly with Anchorage controller through VHF, was transmitting its message using HF. At another point of this section of the flight, at waypoint NABIE, KAL 007 was too far north to make radio contact with the VHF air traffic control relay station on St. Paul Island. KAL 015 relayed for KAL 007. The message was a change in the estimated time of arrival (ETA) for the next waypoint called NEEVA, delaying by four minutes the ETA that KAL 015 had previously relayed on behalf of KAL 007. Since a revised ETA could only be calculated by means of readout information presented by KAL 007's Inertial Navigation Systems Control Display unit, Pearson asserts that pilot and copilot were once again presented with the opportunity of verifying their position and becoming aware of their enormous deviation.

Contrary wind conditions of KAL 007 and KAL 015: KAL 015 had departed about 15 minutes behind KAL 007. About 23 minutes before the tragedy, the two aircraft compared the times that they expected to reach waypoint NOKKA, at which point it became apparent that KAL 015 would reach it only four minutes behind KAL 007. KAL 015 reported experiencing strong tailwinds, while KAL 007 was experiencing a headwind. The paradox of the different flying conditions experienced by two aircraft supposedly flying so close together was discussed in the cabin of KAL 007, but the crew failed to draw any conclusions from it.

Weather radar: There was one last aid to warn the crew. Displayed in consoles at the knees of both pilot and copilot, the plane's weather radar (Note: KAL 007's two Bendix RDR-IF radars had a maximum range of 200 nautical miles (370 km) with a 180° scan capability. ICAO 1983, p. 14, section 1.6.4.1) could have alerted them, both over Kamchatka and later over Sakhalin, to the fact that they were no longer flying over water, as they should have been. Weather radar has two modes—ground mapping (when it would be possible to look down and see water or land masses as well as the contours of the coast lines) and weather surveillance mode for thunderstorm detection. In ground mapping mode, KAL 007 had only to make sure that the land mass of Kamchatka and the island string of the Kurile chain would remain to the right. That night, KAL 007's weather radar was probably not in land mapping mode, for the weather was inclement. The ICAO's meteorological analysis concluded that "there was extensive coverage of low, medium, and high level clouds over southern Kamchatka associated with an active cold front"." ICAO's analysis of KAL 007's weather radar functioning would state, "it was concluded that the radar was not functioning properly or that the ground mapping capability was not used"."

According to the ICAO, an indicator of pilot unawareness of the deviation from route of their flight was the bantering and casual cockpit conversation at the times that awareness of deviation into hostile airspace would have increased tension and have precluded this. (See Korean Air Lines Flight 007 transcripts.)

== Planned spy mission theory ==
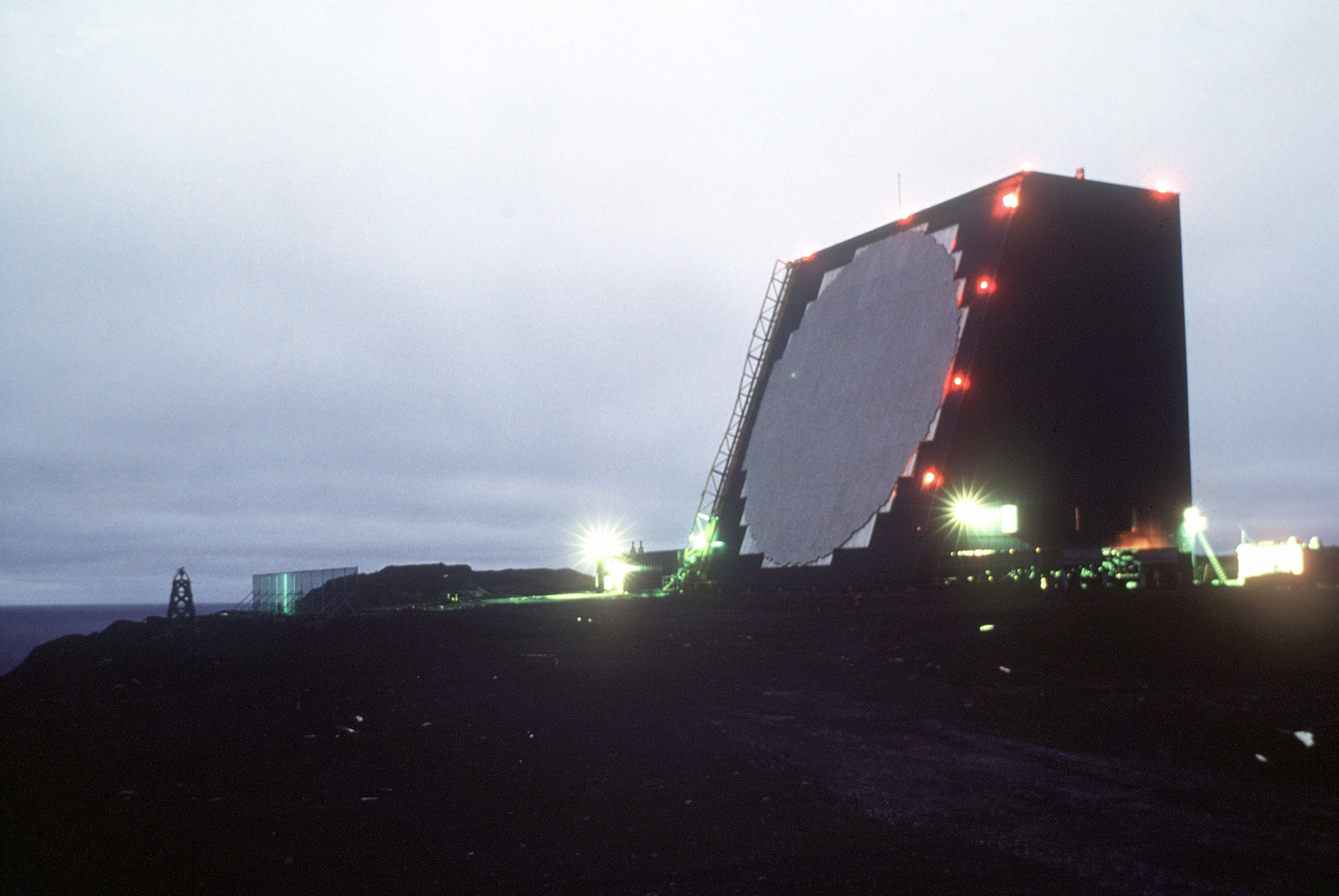
COBRA DANE, an intelligence-gathering phased array radar system specially constructed to monitor Soviet ballistic missile testing on Siberia's Kamchatka Peninsula

In 1994, Robert W. Allardyce and James Gollin wrote Desired Track: The Tragic Flight of KAL Flight 007, supporting the spy mission theory. In 2007, they reiterated their position in a series of articles in Airways Magazine, arguing that the investigation by the International Civil Aviation Organization was a cover-up of a "carefully planned ferret mission". Furthermore, they suggested that the NSA had implemented Electronic Counter Measures to cover for the mission and that the flight recorder tapes had been planted for the Soviet recovery effort to find.

Planned spy mission theories point out the incongruency of a civilian passenger liner going accidentally astray and unnoticed precisely in one of the most militarily sensitive and well-observed areas in the Cold War. They point out that there were powerful land and sea radar arrays that could have tracked KAL 007 as it crossed through the NORAD prohibited-to-civilian flight zone and approached and entered Soviet territory. These were:

- COBRA JUDY aboard the missile range instrumentation ship USNS Observation Island, then off the coast of Kamchatka;
- Shemya Island's COBRA DANE line of sight radar which was capable of tracking an aircraft at up to a 30,000 feet (9,100 m) altitude through an area covering 400 miles (640 km) (the curvature of the Earth being its limiting factor);
- Shemya Island's COBRA TALON, an over-the-horizon radar array with a range from 575 miles (925 km) to 2,070 miles (3,330 km). COBRA TALON operated by bouncing its emissions off the ionosphere (deflection) to the other side of the line of sight horizon, thus acquiring its targets.

These radar arrays had capability for both surveillance and tracking. Whether this capability was actually used in the case of Flight 007 is currently unknown. In addition, the United States Air Force radar stations at Cape Newenham and Cape Romanzoff, two of twelve stations comprising the United States Alaskan Distant Early Warning/Aircraft Control and Warning (DEW/ACW) System, had the capability to track all aircraft heading toward the Russian Buffer Zone. Well within range of these radar sites, KAL 007 had veered directly toward Kamchatka. This theory postulates that the CIA put out disinformation about the aircraft landing at Sakhalin after their mission failed in order to buy time to construct a more credible story.

== Theory of intentional deviation by pilots ==
Horizontal Situation Indicator (stock image)

This theory, promoted by David Pearson in his 1987 book KAL 007: the Cover-up postulates that the pilots made "a deliberate, carefully planned intrusion into Soviet territory with the knowledge of US military and intelligence agencies." He argues that it was impossible for the pilots not to know that they were off course. Various mechanisms, such as the Horizontal Situation Indicator, should, assuming that the aircraft's navigation systems were functional and correctly programmed, have alerted the pilots of their course deviation. In addition, VHF transmissions to Anchorage had to be relayed via flight KAL 015 (which should have been a few minutes behind KAL 007, had it been on course), because the plane had travelled too far off course.

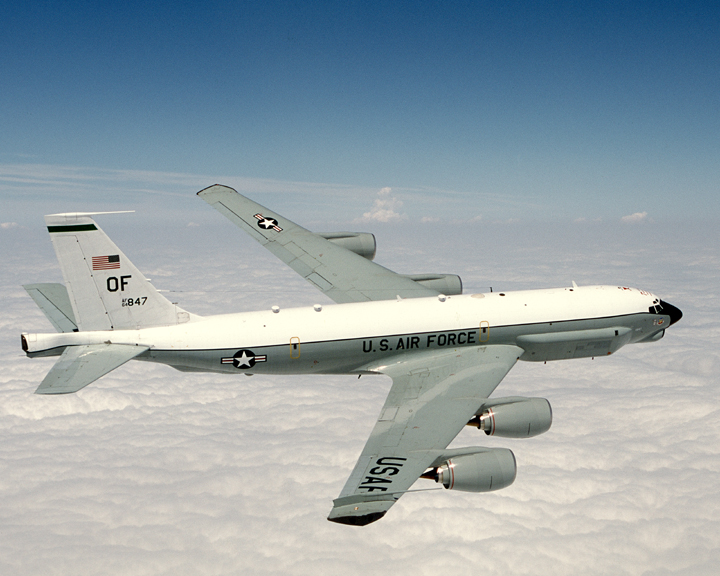
USAF RC-135

Pearson has also questioned why, if the pilots had unintentionally strayed off course, a US RC-135 reconnaissance plane in the area did not see the jumbo jet (or pick up the Soviet radio chatter regarding it) and warn it of its danger, as well as informing its own command and civilian air traffic controllers.

The theory of intentional deviation suffered a blow in 1992 with the handover by the Russian Federation of the Cockpit Voice Recorder tape. This showed that at the times of most danger during the flight, the flight crew was relaxed speaking about currency exchange at Kimpo airport, or bored, or even bantering with each other, indicating to ICAO analysts that the crew of KAL 007 were unaware of the danger they were then exposed to.

Murray Sayle described an earlier version of Pearson's theory published in The Nation as containing "schoolboy howlers, or, better, graduate-student howlers" regarding the operation of cockpit positioning monitors, and Pearson's approach in general as lacking objectivity, and the work of a conspiracy theorist.

== Theory of spy mission involving USAF aircraft ==
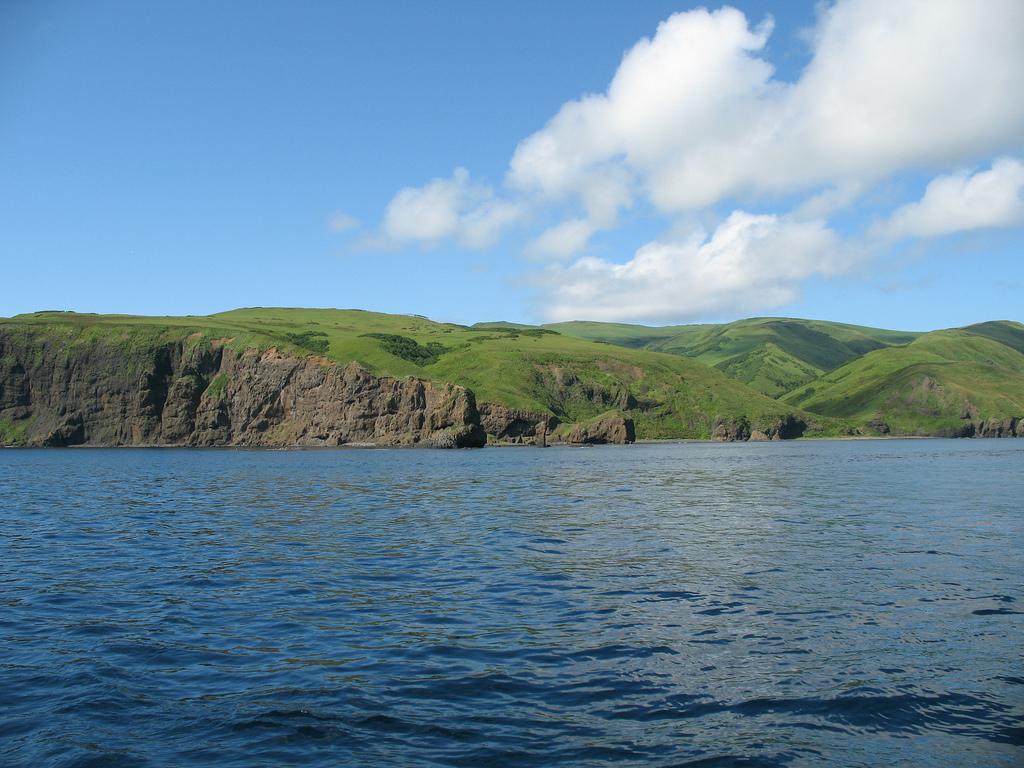
Moneron Island

Another theory was suggested by a French aeronautical expert, Michel Brun, in his book Incident at Sakhalin: The True Mission of KAL Flight 007. It has been supported by a former American diplomat to Moscow, John Keppel, and the American association Foundation for Constitutional Government.

According to this book, the USSR was not guilty. The massacre of Flight 007 was directly caused by the Americans or Japanese. KAL 007 was involved in a spy mission intended to trigger Soviet air defences and to cover up for the missions of several USAF surveillance aircraft. Soviet Fighters attacked these aircraft but did not destroy KAL 007 which crashed far away from Sakhalin in Japanese "friendly" territory in the Japanese sea near North Honshu.

The Korean aircraft was correctly communicating with other KAL crews, forty-six minutes after the official time of the shootdown. A large air battle allegedly occurred between the Soviet Air Force and the USAF, during which the Soviets shot down several American aircraft, including an RC-135, an EF-111 and probably even an SR-71. The SU-15 pilot, Major Osipovich, flew two sorties and shot down two targets (contradicted by the 1991 interview with Osipovich). Furthermore, for a long time all the experts believed that the Soviet fighter pilot was called Major Kazmin. Michel Brun believes that Kazmin and Osipovich twice destroyed an aircraft, but absolutely not the KAL 007. According to the theory, the whereabouts of the KAL-007 wreckage is not known to anyone, but is probably 500 kilometres (310 mi) away from Moneron Island down the coast of Japan. The theory postulates further that the real cause of the destruction is not known, but could have been a surface-to-air missile fired from USS Badger (similar case with USS Vincennes shooting down of Iran Air Flight 655) or from Japanese forces, who could not identify the airliner which was keeping radio silence.

In March 1991 an anonymous Japanese pilot said on TV that he knew who was guilty: a colleague who became a taxi driver in Tokyo. The lack of bodies, body parts, and wreckage of KAL 007 around Sakhalin and Moneron Islands was an indication to Brun that KAL 007 did not come down in those locales. Sparse remains showing up on the beaches of Hokkaido, nine days after the destruction of KAL 007 south of Moneron and Sakhalin, are evidence to Brun that KAL 007 was downed further south and that these remains were brought northward by the north running Tsushima current along the west Japanese coast. This opposes the commonly held understanding that the remains were carried from the waters near the islands of Sakhalin and Moneron by the West Sakhalin current flowing south between the two islands (at 1 mile per hour (1.6 km/h)), then by the West Sakhalin convergent current (6.9–8.1 mph, 11–13 km/h) near the tip of Sakhalin (35 nautical miles away from Moneron), into the Soya Strait, and finally onto the beaches of Hokkaido. Brun also claims to have discovered that KAL 007 communicated by radio in Korean with two other Korean aircraft after 03:27, the official time of its destruction: at 03:54 with KAL 015, 04:10 with KE50, and twice at 04:13, the true time of the aircraft crashing. This unusual last call, which was sent to the two aircraft and suddenly cut, could probably be explained by a serious problem occurring.

In his book, Brun published a photograph of a weapon found by Japanese sailors from JMSA among KAL 007 debris "north of Moneron Island on 10 September 1983", bearing the mark "N3". The letter N does not exist in the Russian Cyrillic alphabet, suggesting that the weapon was not Soviet.

Brun's theory attempts to account for the only eyewitness report of an explosion near Moneron Island which is considered to be that of KAL 007 on its way to the water. A Japanese fisherman aboard the Chidori Maru 58 had reported to the Japanese Maritime Safety Agency (and this report was forgotten in 1984 but cited by the ICAO analysis in 1993) of hearing a plane at low altitude but not seeing it. Then he heard "a loud sound followed by a bright flash of light on the horizon, then another dull sound and a less intense flash of light on the horizon" as well as smelling aviation fuel.

Brun maintains that the fisherman's account of the destruction of KAL 007 was not sustainable because if the aircraft exploded while low on the horizon, the sound of the explosion could not have, as reported by the fishermen, reached his ear before the flash of the explosion reached the eye, as light travels faster than sound. Brun further maintains, in accordance with his theory of an aerial combat between Russian and US aircraft, that the "loud sound" heard prior to the "flash of light on the horizon" could have been the sound of a missile fired by a military jet flying above or near the Chidori Maru 58, at an opposing military jet, the explosion of which was seen by the fisherman, and wrongly attributed by ICAO analysts to KAL 007, which Brun believes went down in Japanese waters much further south of Moneron at 04:13:16s. Among Michel Brun's supporters since 1995 is David Pearson, author of KAL 007: the Cover-up.

== Theories about lack of human remains and luggage at impact site ==
These theories attempt to explain why there were no surface finds at the place postulated for the KAL 007's impact with the water. There were no bodies, body parts, or body tissues, and there was no luggage. Furthermore, on the sea bottom there was only one partial torso and 10 body parts or tissues, possibly from the same individual, noted by Soviet civilian divers who had commenced diving to the wreckage purported to be of KAL 007 just two weeks after the shootdown. Furthermore, for all of the 269 occupants, divers reported with surprise either no luggage or, in one diver's report, there were only a few pieces of luggage at the bottom. Of the thirteen body parts or tissues washed up on the Japanese Hokkaido beaches 70 miles from Soviet Moneron Island and starting eight days after the shoot down, all were unidentifiable. All the non-human items (see main article) recovered from Hokkaido's beaches were those generally coming from a passenger cabin of an aircraft and none from the cargo hold, contrary to what would be expected if there had been a total destruction from a passenger aircraft crashing into the sea.

=== Crab theory ===
In his book The Mystery of Korean Boeing 747, Soviet correspondent Andrey Illesh proposes that the bodies were eaten by giant crabs. The crab theory has been persistent and been echoed by the Soviet interceptor pilot Gennady Osipovich, who fired the missile that shot down the plane.

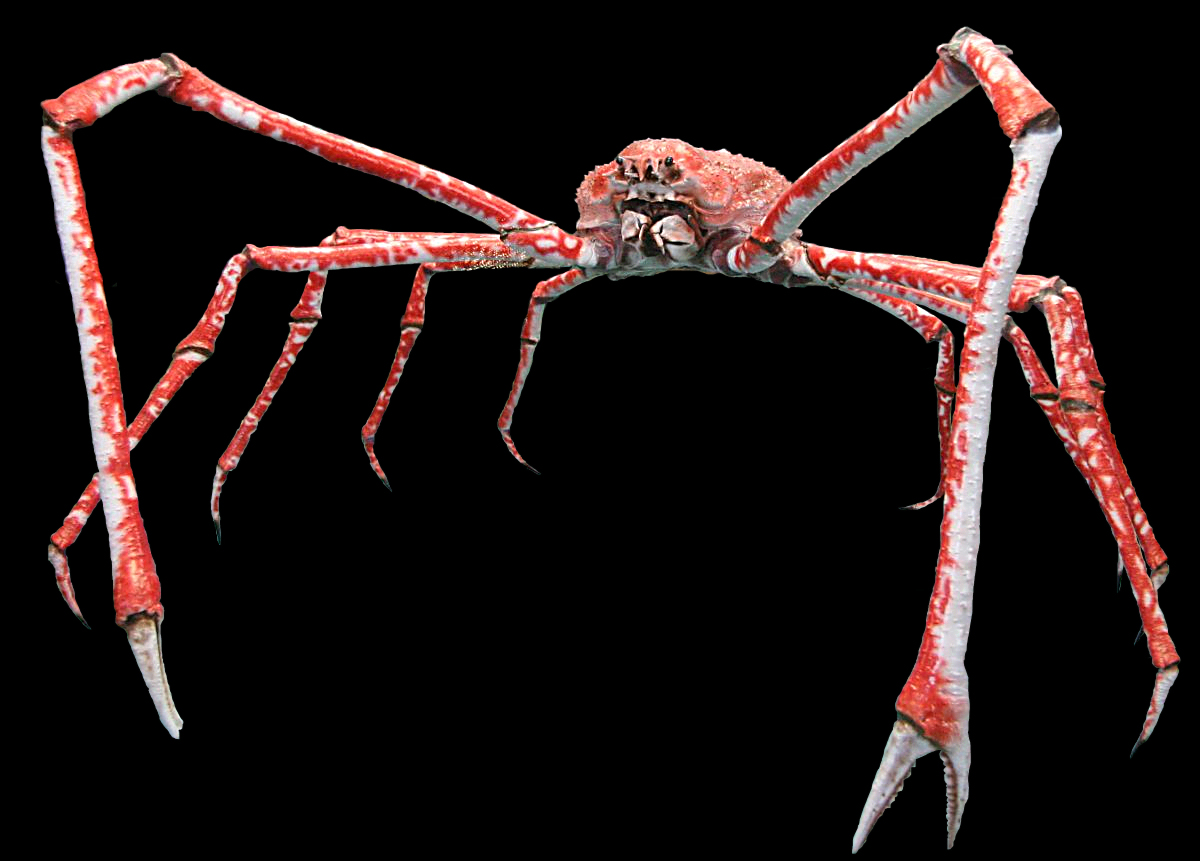
Japanese spider crab

"... I heard that they had found the 'Boeing' when I was still on Sakhalin. And even investigated it. But no one saw people there. I, however, explain that by the fact that there are crabs in the sea off Sakhalin that immediately devour everything ... I did hear that they found only a hand in a black glove. Perhaps it was the hand of the pilot of the aircraft that I shot down. You know, even now I cannot really believe that there were passengers on board. You cannot write off everyone to the crabs ... Surely something would be left? ... Nevertheless, I am a supporter of the old version: It was a spy plane. In any event, it was not happenstance that it flew towards us."

Professor William Newman, marine biologist, explains why the crab (or any other sea creature) theory is untenable: "Even if we proceed from the supposition that crustaceans, or sharks, or something else fell upon the flesh, the skeletons should have remained. In many cases, skeletons were found on the sea or ocean floor, which had sat there for many years and, even decades. In addition, the crustaceans would not have touched bones." Also, the crab theory could not account for the lack of luggage.

=== Decompression theory ===
Another explanation is provided by Izvestiya correspondents Shalnev and Illesh's interview of Mikhail Igorevich Girs, Captain of the Tinro 2 submersible which made most of the dives. In the May 31, 1991, edition of Izvestiya, Capt. Girs suggested that the passengers were sucked out of the aircraft, leaving their clothes behind.

"Something else was inexplicable to us—zipped-up clothes. For instance, a coat, slacks, shorts, a sweater with zippers—the items were different, but, zipped up. And nothing inside. We came to this conclusion then: Most likely, the passengers had been pulled out of the plane by decompression, and they fell in a completely different place from where we found the debris. They had been spread out over a much larger area. The current also did its work."

=== "Wind tunnel" theory ===
The latest reference to the decompression theory of the missing bodies was made by Lieutenant General Valeri Kamenski, most recently Chief of Staff and Deputy Commander of the Ukrainian Air Force and formerly Chief of Staff of the Soviet Far East Military District Air Defense Force. In an article dated March 15, 2001, in the Ukrainian weekly Fakty i Kommentarii, General Kamenski spoke about this lingering question: "It is still a mystery what happened to the bodies of the crew and passengers on the plane. According to one theory, right after the rocket's detonation, the nose and tail section of the jumbo fell off and the mid-fuselage became a sort of wind tunnel so the people were swept through it and scattered over the surface of the ocean. Yet in this case, some of the bodies were to have been found during the search operations in the area. The question of what actually happened to the people has not been given a distinct answer."

=== Theory of Soviet removal of bodies ===
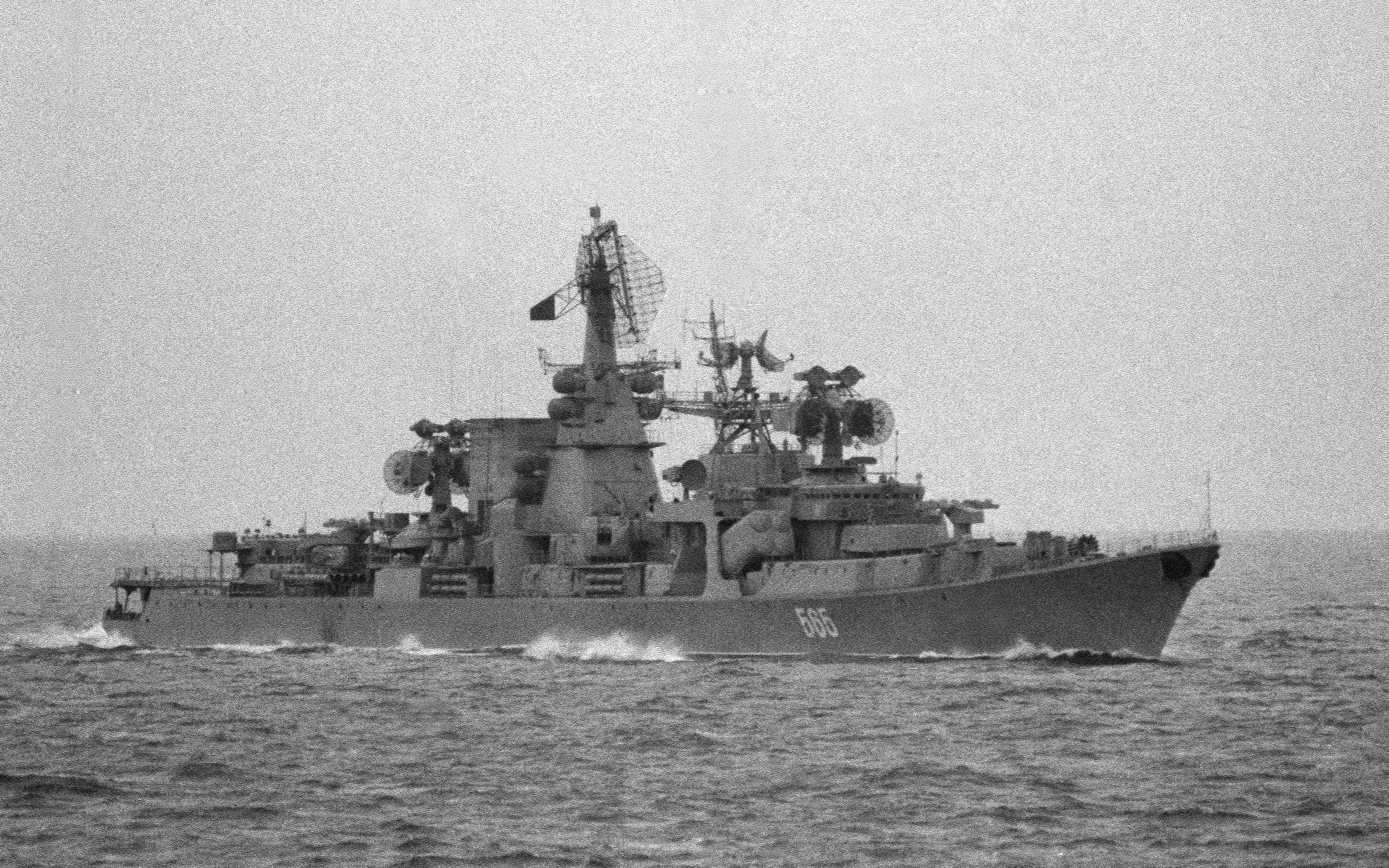
Guided missile cruiser Petropavlovsk (565) in 225-square-nautical-mile (770 km^{2}) search area north of Moneron

This theory rests on the fact that when the Soviet civilian divers first went down to the wreck just two weeks after the shootdown, the finds they encountered were contrary to an aircraft having fallen from the sky. They reportedly corresponded more to "secondary placement" of the wreckage, and removal of both the passengers and aircrew of KAL 007, by the Soviet navy, who they claim had been at work prior to them, using both divers and trawlers.

"The first submergence was on 15 September, two weeks after the aircraft had been shot down. As we learned then, before us the trawlers had done some 'work' in the designated quadrant. It is hard to understand what sense the military saw in the trawling operation. First drag everything haphazardly around the bottom by the trawls, and then send in the submersibles? ... It is clear that things should have been done in the reverse order."

Captain Mikhail Igorevich Girs: "Submergence 10 October. Aircraft pieces, wing spars, pieces of aircraft skin, wiring, and clothing. But—no people. The impression is that all of this has been dragged here by a trawl rather than falling down from the sky ..."

This was one of the theories expressed in the original Izvestia series of 1990–91, and the later interview of deep sea diver Vadim Kondrabayev (subsequently reprinted in English by Roy's Russian Aircraft Review). Kondrabayev, one of the civilian divers brought to explore the wreckage of KAL 007 in 1983, gave an interview to the Russian magazine Itogi, published on October 1, 2000. He points out that after he and the other civilian divers were brought to Sakhalin on September 10, 1983, they were kept there until "the end of September. ... They literally forgot about us for several days." When they did get to the wreckage, they were surprised to find neither bodies nor luggage: "... of the people who supposedly were on board, something should have remained. We worked beneath the water almost a month for five hours a day and didn't find one suitcase, not even a handle from them. After all there is baggage on any air trip. We either were able to work on the remains, which already had been filtered by the special services, or, what I also do not discount, there were no passengers at all on the airplane, and they stuffed the cabin with rubbish. ... It is quite possible that several mini-submarines with military divers went down to the Boeing even before us and collected everything, and scattered the remaining parts of the destroyed liner about or left them there where they were needed, and afterwards called us as a smoke screen."

=== Theory of abduction and retention of passengers and crew ===
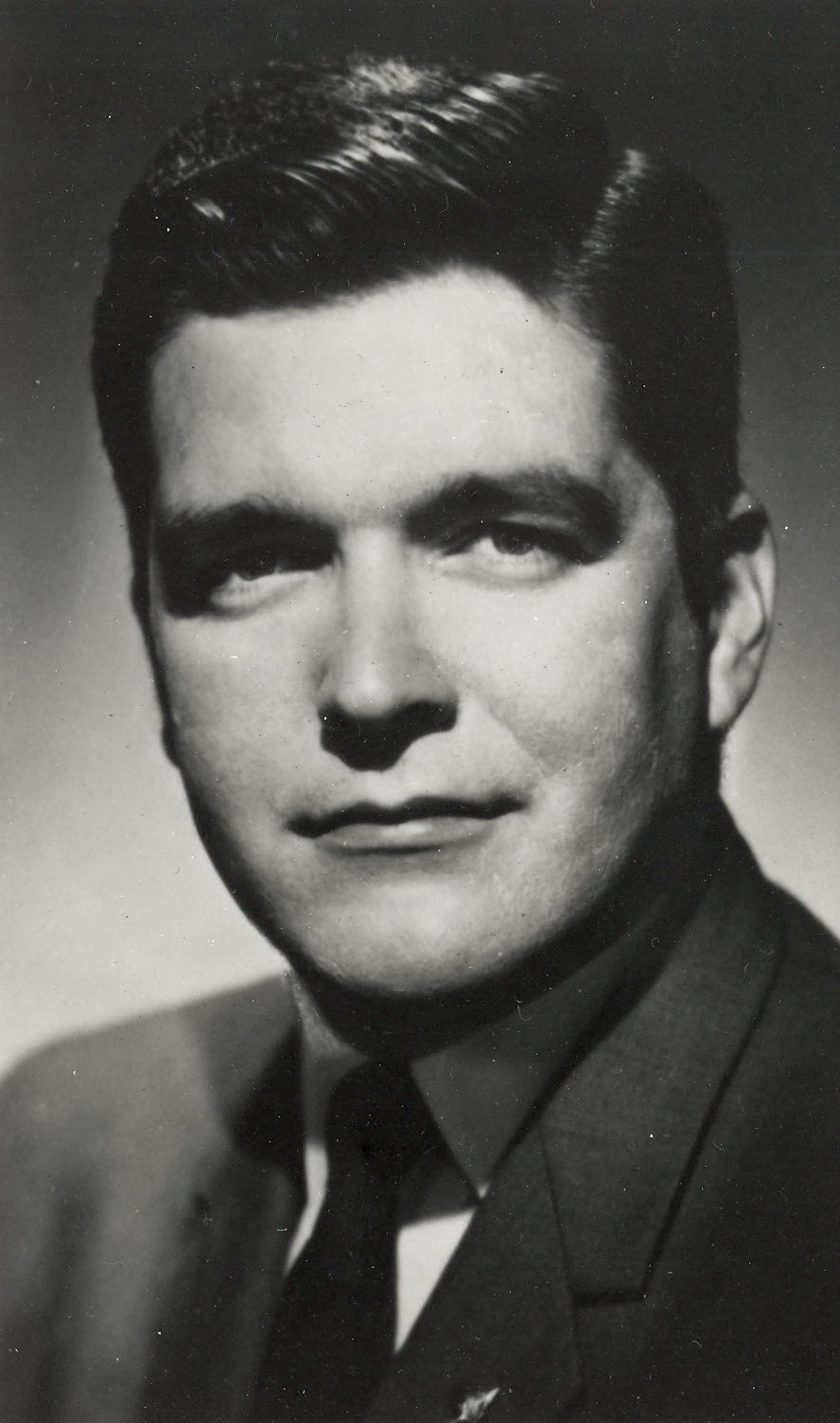
Larry McDonald

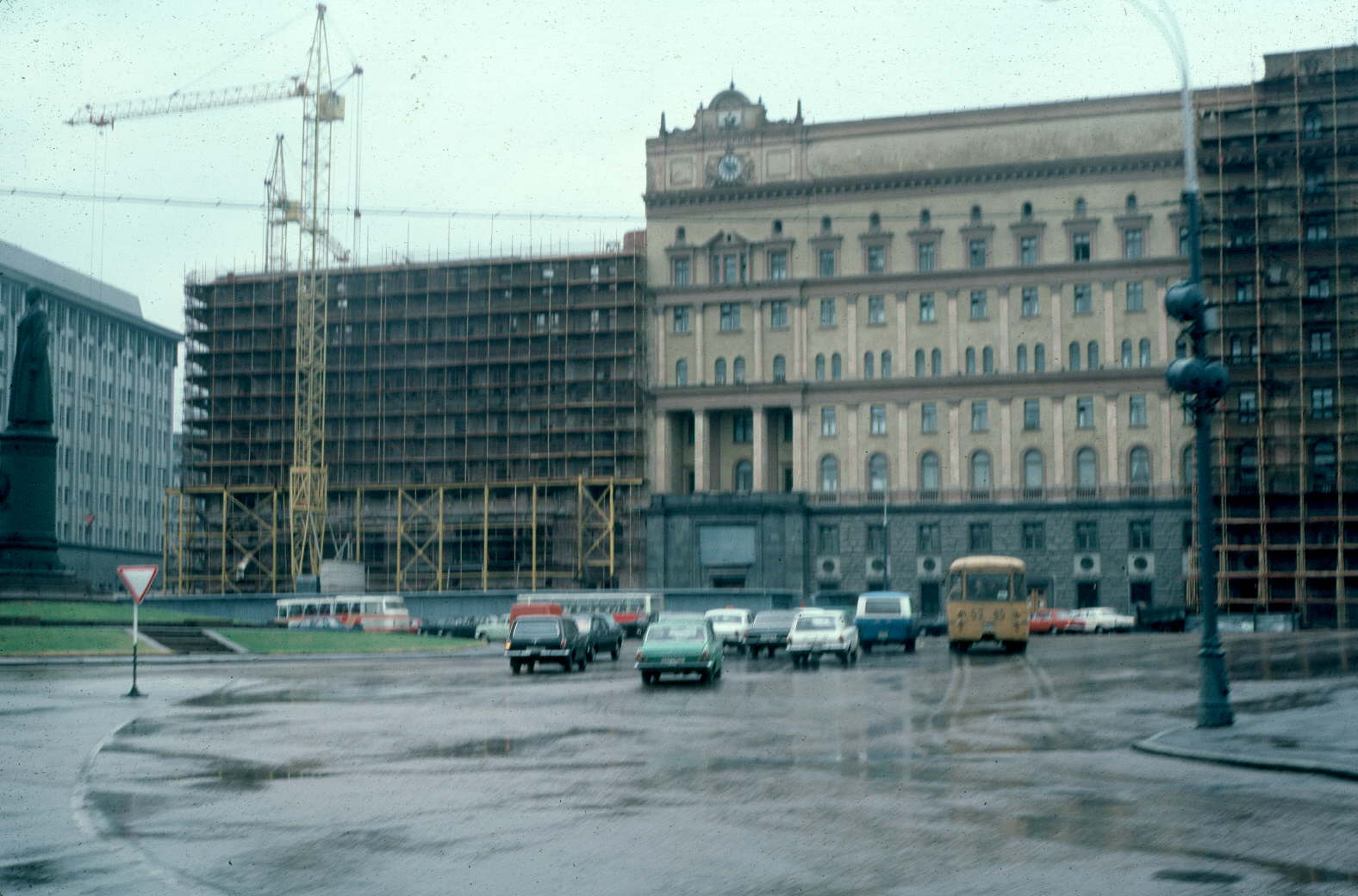
Lubyanka in 1983

The abduction theory proposes that KAL 007, having been missed by one of the missiles, landed or successfully ditched with passengers and crew surviving; they were then abducted and put into prison camps by the Soviet authorities. Among its advocates are the Israeli-American Bert Schlossberg, a son-in-law of one of the crash victims (and his organisation, the International Committee for the Rescue of KAL 007 Survivors), and Avraham Shifrin, a Soviet emigre to Israel in the 1970s and former Soviet prison camp inmate. It has received some coverage in the conservative news agency Accuracy in Media.

Schlossberg, as a new citizen of Israel, met Shifrin in 1989, and through Shifrin, met and questioned one of his sources, and came to question the accepted belief that the people of KAL 007 had perished. Through his own investigation and research of newly released documents, Schlossberg became convinced that the passengers and crew of KAL 007 had been recovered by the Russians and then imprisoned. In a self-published book and on the Committee website, Schlossberg corroborates this theory with claims that Soviet military communication and cockpit voice recorder transcripts show a post-missile detonation flightpath at altitude 5,000 meters for almost five minutes until over the only land mass in the Tatar Straits and within Soviet territorial waters, where it began a slow spiral descent. He claims this indicates both the aircraft's capability of extended flight, and the pilots' intention to water land near the only point where rescue would be feasible. He furthermore claims that a lack of bodies, body parts and tissues, and luggage, both on the surface of the sea and at the bottom; the Soviet obstruction of US, Korean, and Japanese search vessels trying to enter into Soviet territorial waters around Moneron Island, near which KAL 007 was last tracked spiraling downward; previously unknown Soviet transcripts, released by the Russian Federation, of mission orders within one half hour of the shootdown, sending helicopters, KGB patrol boats, and civilian trawlers to Moneron Island; and the Russian Federation acknowledgement of Soviet deception in its part of the search for KAL 007 all indicate a Soviet recovery of passengers and crew from the damaged and downed passenger jet.

Schlossberg has also claimed that a letter sent in 1991 by Senator Jesse Helms, while he was ranking minority member of the Senate Committee on Foreign Relations, to Russian president Boris Yeltsin, requesting information about the fate of KAL 007, indicates that Helms took the abduction theory seriously. The letter included, in a list of questions, a request to know the whereabouts of any survivors and their camp locations, and requested also to know of the fate of Larry McDonald.

Schlossberg's work has not gained mainstream media attention; in a review of the circumstances of the death of Larry McDonald, University of Georgia Law Professor Donald E. Wilkes considered the theory as "even more preposterous" than Michel Brun's theory of a Japanese locale for the shootdown and an air battle having taken place between Soviet and American aircraft.

Avraham Shifrin, a self-declared KGB expert, claimed that, according to the investigation of his research centre, KAL 007 landed on water north of Moneron, and the passengers successfully disembarked on emergency floats. The Soviets collected them and subsequently sent them to camps (with the children "separated from their parents and safely hidden in the orphan houses of one of the Soviet Middle Asian republics"). McDonald in particular was supposed to have gone through a number of prisons in Moscow, among them the Central Lubyanka, and Lefortovo.

The aeronautics journalist James Oberg, while acknowledging Shifrin's expertise on Soviet prison camps, has stated that Shifrin "got real confused" about the fate of KAL 007. Hans Ephraimson-Abt, a relative of one of the passengers, has called Shifrin a "con man who has no idea how much grief he has caused to families," having been frustrated in his attempts to meet Shifrin's sources.

According to Michel Brun this theory is not entirely preposterous. In his book he analyses the first news, communicated by CIA and South Korean government: that KAL 007 landed in Sakhalin and all passengers were safe. In his careful searches, he discovered the source of this first information. It was published in a Japanese newspaper, Mainichi Shimbun, on September 1, 1983. According to him, this observation came from Wakkanai radars. So, he suggests that another aircraft, probably military, landed at Sakhalin during the "Sakhalin battle" and that its passengers, American, South Korean, or both, were jailed in the Soviet Union.

== Meaconing theory ==
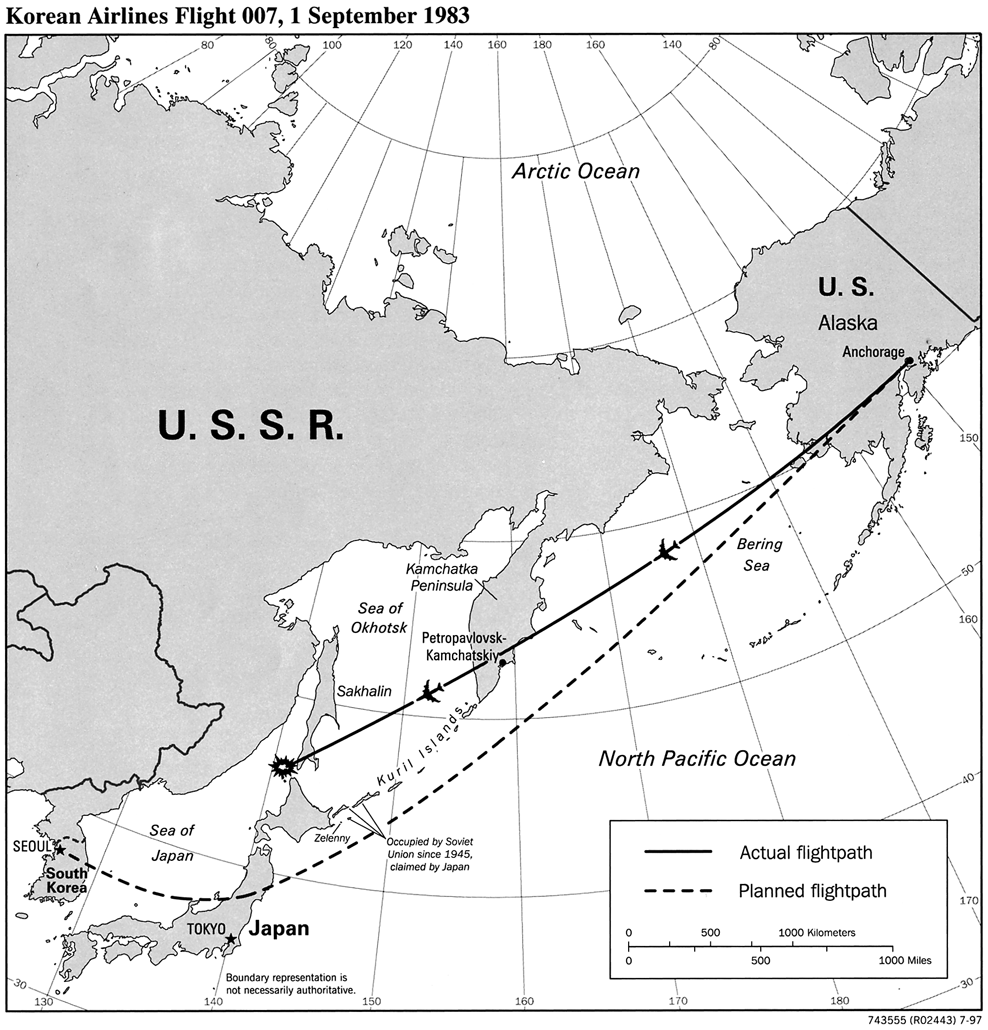
KAL 007's increasingly deviated flight

Meaconing is the term to describe the interception and rebroadcasting of navigational signals in order to confuse the sending aircraft about its own true location. (There is an assumption that the target does not have secondary navigational aids such as INS or radar). This is a prelude to a deviation such as that experienced by KAL 007 on its intended course from Anchorage, Alaska, to Seoul, Korea. Meaconing was used frequently during the Cold War. The theory that meaconing was used against KAL 007 often entails the following points which are shown to be true from the transcripts or assumed to be true by the theory's proponents:

- the pilots of KAL 007 clearly believed that they were on a course different from the one that they were actually flying;
- Democratic Congressman Larry McDonald was known to be aboard KAL 007 and was considered the chief anti-Communist in Congress, and was also the second head of the John Birch Society;
- other anti-communist lawmakers were understood to have been with Larry McDonald aboard KAL 007, as it was not known that they had opted for another flight, KAL 015; these congressmen were North Carolina Senator Jesse Helms, Idaho Senator Steven Symms, and Kentucky Representative Carroll Hubbard. The intended destination and purpose of all these congressmen was ostensibly the Seoul celebration of the 30-year anniversary of the US–South Korea Mutual Defense Treaty, but in actuality, their main purpose was to further the anti-Communist coalition and activity.

It is sometimes suggested that Soviet meaconing of KAL 007 was performed with the tacit approval or with the active participation and planning of leftist and socialist power centres in the US government.

Finally, in support of the meacon theory, this information that surfaced during the ICAO investigation and is considered indicative of purposeful intent to cause KAL 007 to go astray: At 28 minutes after takeoff, civilian radar at Kenai, on the eastern shore of Cook Inlet and 53 nautical miles (98 km) southwest of Anchorage, with a radar coverage of 175 miles (282 km) west of Anchorage, tracked KAL 007 more than six miles (10 km) north of its intended course. KAL 007 and all flights departing from Anchorage on route J501 had to pass Cairn Mountain, which was the site of a nondirectional radio beacon (NDB). An NDB navigational aid operates by transmitting a continuous three-letter identification code which is picked up by the airborne receiver, the Automatic Direction Finder (ADF). Cairn Mountain was KAL 007's first assigned navigational aid out of Anchorage Airport. That night, Douglas L. Porter was the controller at Air Route Traffic Control Center at Anchorage, assigned to monitor all flights in that sector and record their observed position in relation to the fix provided by the Cairn Mountain nondirectional beacon. Porter later testified that all had seemed normal to him. Yet he apparently failed to record, as required, the position of two flights that night: KAL 007 and KAL 015, which followed KAL 007 by several minutes. Had he done so, it would have provided an opportunity to warn KAL 007 of its deviation, resulting in the necessary correction for the rest of the flight. To holders of the meaconing theory, the above seem curious, ominous, and ancillary to their theory.

== US government cover-up theory ==
Holders of this theory point to two sets of facts indicating that the US government had covered up the incident and had skewed the investigation for political ends. The first set of facts relate to US capability and actuality of tracking KAL 007 in its deviated flight, thus presenting the possibility of warning the aircraft in time to avert its entrance into harm's way.

The Cape Newenham and Cape Romanzoff radars monitored at the NORAD Regional Operations Command Center were but two of twelve comprising the United States Alaskan Distant Early Warning / Aircraft Control and Warning (DEW/ACW) System. These United States Air Force radar stations at Cape Newenham and Cape Romanzoff in Alaska had the capability to track all aircraft heading toward the Russian Buffer Zone, though it is not known if the radar results of such "outgoing" tracking would have been monitored in "real-time" at the facility at Elmendorf Air Force base. These tapes remain unavailable to the public for national security reasons. However, there was another location at which KAL 007 could well have been tracked in its deviation. This was at the installation at King Salmon, Alaska. It is customary for the Air Force to impound radar trackings involving possible litigation in cases of aviation accidents. In the civil litigation for damages, the United States Department of Justice explained that the tapes from the Air Force radar installation at King Salmon, pertinent to KAL 007's flight in the Bethel area had been destroyed and could therefore not be supplied to the plaintiffs. At first, Justice Department lawyer Jan Van Flatern stated that they were destroyed 15 days after the shootdown. Later, he said he had "misspoken" and changed the time of destruction to 30 hours after the event. A Pentagon spokesman concurred, saying that the tapes are re-cycled for reuse from 24 to 30 hours afterwards, however the fate of KAL 007 was known inside this timeframe.

The second set of facts relate to a series of moves taking the investigation out of the hands of the National Transportation Safety Board and in the hands of the International Civil Aviation Organization. Normally, when an airliner crashes, responsibility for the inquiry falls to the NTSB, which has the technical expertise to assess what happened. Although the downing of the Flight 007 cannot be classified as a routine aviation disaster, the NTSB office in Anchorage was notified that the plane was missing just three hours after it had come down in the Sea of Japan (East Sea) and immediately began to look into the matter. Shortly, after that, it was told to cease its investigation and forward to its headquarters in Washington all the material—originals and copies—it had gathered. From there, the information was sent to the State Department. James Michelangelo, chief of the NTSB's Anchorage office, was told by headquarters that the Board was off the case and that the State Department would handle the investigation. Eighteen months after the airliner was shot down, when asked if the State Department had ever conducted such an enquiry, a high-level State Department official, Lynn Pascoe, replied, "How is the State Department going to investigate?"

Holders of this theory ask why the effective investigation in progress, conducted by NTSB—Anchorage station chief James Michelangelo, was preempted (the very first occurrence) by the Washington-based NTSB home office under orders from the State Department, which itself did not, as originally announced, investigate the disaster, but rather referred the investigation to the political and investigatively ineffective United Nations International Civil Aviation Organization. The ICAO has no subpoena powers and, according to its mandate, can analyse only material presented to it by its constituent interested members. ICAO's final reports, it is maintained, are reflections of the politically expedient rather than of an independent investigative determination. The only other air disaster ICAO had ever investigated was the Israeli shootdown of Libyan Arab Airlines Flight 114 over the Sinai.

In January 1996, Hans Ephraimson-Abt, chairman of the "American Association for Families of KAL 007 Victims", claimed that South Korean President Chun Doo-hwan accepted $4 million from Korean Air in order to gain "government protection" during the investigation of the shootdown.

== See also ==
- Korean Air Lines Flight 007 transcripts
- List of airliner shootdown incidents
- Pan Am Flight 103 conspiracy theories
- TWA Flight 800 conspiracy theories
- MH17
