= Medal "For the Capture of Königsberg" =

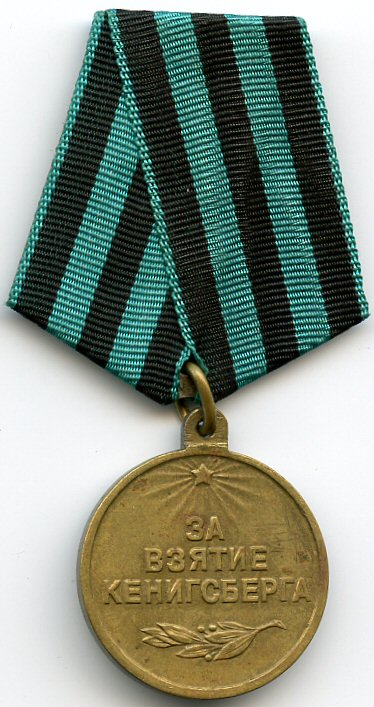
- Medal "For the Capture of Königsberg" (obverse)
- Type: Campaign medal
- Awarded for: Participation in the capture of Königsberg
- Presented by: USSR
- Eligibility: Citizens of the Soviet Union
- Status: No longer awarded
- Established: June 9, 1945

Highlights
- Total: ~760,000
- Ribbon of the Medal

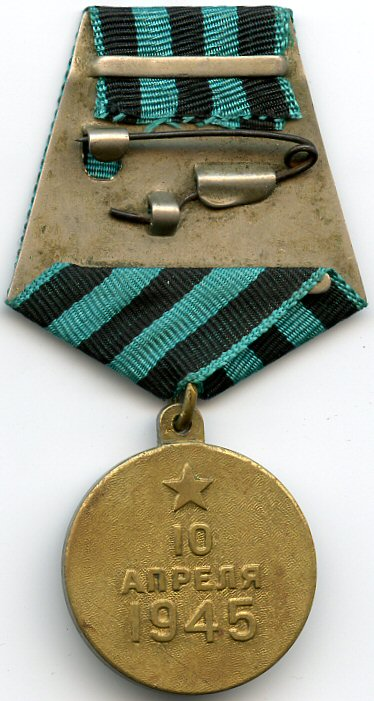
Reverse of the Medal "For the Capture of Königsberg"

The Medal "For the Capture of Königsberg" (Russian: Медаль «За взятие Кёнигсберга») was a World War II campaign medal of the Soviet Union established on June 9, 1945 by decree of the Presidium of the Supreme Soviet of the USSR to satisfy the petition of the People's Commissariat for Defense of the Soviet Union. It recognizes participation in the battle to capture the city of Königsberg from the armed forces of Nazi Germany. The medal's statute was amended on July 18, 1980 by decree of the Presidium of the Supreme Soviet of the USSR № 2523-X.

== Medal statute ==
The medal was awarded to soldiers of the Red Army, Navy, and troops of the NKVD, direct participants of the assault and capture of Königsberg as well as to the organizers and leaders of combat operations in the capture of this city.

The medal was awarded on behalf of the Presidium of the Supreme Soviet of the USSR on the basis of documents attesting to actual participation in the capture of Königsberg. Serving military personnel received the medal from their unit commander, retirees from military service received the medal from a regional, municipal or district military commissioner in the recipient's community.

The medal was worn on the left side of the chest, immediately after the Medal "For the Capture of Budapest". If worn in the presence of orders or medals of the Russian Federation, the latter have precedence.

== Medal description ==
It is a circular brass medal, 32 mm in diameter. The obverse has a raised rim and shows a small relief five pointed star with divergent rays at the top. Below this is a relief inscription in bold letters on three rows "FOR THE CAPTURE OF KÖNIGSBERG" (Russian: «ЗА ВЗЯТИЕ КЕНИГСБЕРГА»), with a relief image of a horizontal laurel branch below. The reverse bears the relief date in three rows "10 APRIL 1945" (Russian: «10 АПРЕЛЯ 1945») below a relief plain five pointed star.

The medal is secured by a ring through the medal suspension loop to a standard Soviet pentagonal mount covered by a 24mm wide silk moiré ribbon with 2 mm green edge stripes and five 4 mm wide alternating stripes, three black and two green.

== Recipients ==
Up to 1987, about 760,000 awards of the medal were made.

Those awarded the medal include:

- Marshal of the Soviet Union Ivan Khristoforovich Bagramyan
- Major General Anatoly Ivanovich Bankuzov (ru)
- Major General Viktor Petrovich Beltiukov (ru)
- Lieutenant Colonel Stepan Nikolayevich Borozenets
- Colonel Anatoly Vasilievich Dorofeev (ru)
- Army General Ivan Ivanovich Fedyuninsky
- Captain Nikolai Ivanovich Fomin (ru)
- Army General Kuzma Nikitovich Galitsky
- Guards Private Mikhail Ivanovich Gavrilov (ru)
- Chief Marshal of Aviation Alexander Yevgeniyevich Golovanov
- Military photographer Yevgeny Anan'evich Khaldei
- Colonel Pavel Sergeevich Korchmaryuk (ru)
- Marshal of the Soviet Union Pyotr Kirillovich Koshevoi
- Lieutenant General Alexander Sergeevich Ksenofontov (ru)
- Chief Petty Officer Ekaterina Mikhailova-Demina
- Lieutenant General Alexander Ignatyevich Molodchy
- Chief Marshal of Artillery Mitrofan Ivanovich Nedelin
- Colonel Stepan Yakovlevich Nehaenko (ru)
- Sergeant Shabsa Mashkautsan
- Senior Lieutenant Ilya Mikhailovich Pankov (ru)
- Major General Georgy Borisovich Peters (ru)
- Major General Vladimir Konstantinovich Polupanov (ru)
- Marshal of the Soviet Union Konstantin Ksawerowicz Rokossovsky
- Major Avraham Isaakovich Shifrin
- Major Ivan Pavlovich Shitikov (ru)
- Painter Mikhail Evdokimovich Tkachev
- Admiral Vladimir Filippovich Tributs
- Captain 3rd grade Michael Petrovich Tsiselsky
- Marshal of the Soviet Union Aleksandr Mikhaylovich Vasilevsky
- People's Artist of the USSR Yevgeny Yakovlevich Vesnik

== See also ==
- Awards and decorations of the Soviet Union
- Battle of Königsberg
- Königsberg
