= Avraham Shifrin =

Soviet-born Israeli politician and human rights activist

- Авраам Шифрин; Аўраам Шыфрын שיפרין אברהם
- Born: Avraham Isaakovich Shifrin; 8 October 1923; Minsk, Byelorussian SSR, Soviet Union (now Belarus)
- Died: 5 March 1998 (aged 74); Jerusalem, Israel
- Occupations: Politician; lawyer; human rights activist
- Spouse: Eleonora Shifrin (m. 1974–1998)

Avraham Shifrin (Belarusian: Аўраам Ісакавіч Шыфрын; Yiddish: שיפרין אברהם; Russian: Авраам Исаакович Шифрин, Avraam Shifrin; October 8, 1923 – 1998) was a Soviet-born human rights activist, Zionist, author, lawyer, and Israeli politician who spent a decade in Soviet prisons for allegedly spying for the US and Israel. Avraham Shifrin was one of the world’s top authorities on the Soviet system of prisons and slave labor camps. Shifrin's testimonies before Internal Security Subcommittee of the Senate and other congressional committee (House Banking and Currency Committee, 1973), provided the world with the major listing of Soviet slave labor camps.

== Biography ==
Avraham Shifrin was born on October 8, 1923, in Minsk, USSR (modern Belarus) into a Jewish family. His father, Isaak Shifrin, was arrested in 1937, sentenced under false charges to ten years of corrective labor in Kolyma. During World War II, Avraham Shifrin fought in Shtrafbat, Soviet penal battalion, where he was drafted as a son of the Enemy of the people (Russian language: сын врага народа, "syn vraga naroda"). He participated in the Battle of Königsberg and was awarded the Medal "For the Capture of Königsberg". As a lawyer, in 1949–1953, he worked for the Soviet Ministry of Defense and at the same time actively participated in the Zionist movement. In 1953, he was falsely accused in spying for the U.S. and Israel, and sentenced to death. Later, the death sentence was changed to 25 in the Gulag, five years of exile to remote regions, and five years of revocation of civil rights. However, in 1963, Shifrin was released from prison, and in 1970 was allowed to emigrate to Israel. Shifrin testified before the Senate Committee on the Judiciary in 1973 that American prisoners of war were being held in Soviet prison camps. According to Arnold Beizer, a Hartford lawyer, the testimony was corroborated by Russian president Boris Yeltsin in 1992, who said American soldiers had been transferred to Russian labor camps.

== Russian Gulag on Wrangell Island ==
According to Avraham Shifrin's research, massive Russian Gulag concentration camp has been found on the Russian Wrangel Island in the Arctic Ocean (71° North, 179° West). The camps on Wrangell were revealed in the 1982 book "The First Guidebook to Prisons and Concentration Camps of the Soviet Union," by Avraham Shifrin (Bantam Books). His research institute interviewed hundreds of escapees from Soviet gulags. In his 1973 testimony before the U. S. Senate Internal Security Subcommittee, Shifrin described three concentration camps with thousands of prisoners, and in one camp was an atomic reactor used in radiation experiments on live prisoners. American prisoners of war may have been on Wrangell. The Russians are reputed to have taken American and other military prisoners from World War II, the Korean War, and the Vietnam War to Siberian slave labor camps. Even the famed World War II hero Raoul Wallenberg (who was declared an honorary U. S. citizen along with Winston Churchill) was seen in a camp on Wrangell Island in 1962, according to testimony of imprisoned Soviet SMERSH officer Efim Moshinskiy in Shifrin’s book

== Korean Air Lines Flight 007 alternative theory ==
Avraham Shifrin claimed that according to the investigation of his Research Centre for Prisons, Psychprisons and Forced Labor Concentration Camps of the USSR, Korean Air Lines Flight 007 landed on water north of Moneron Island, and the passengers successfully disembarked on emergency floats, following its shootdown by Soviets after it intruded into the prohibited airspace of Soviet Union on September 1, 1983. The Soviets collected them and subsequently sent them to camps with the children "separated from their parents and safely hidden in the orphan houses of one of the Soviet Middle Asian republics". According to Michel Brun this theory is not entirely preposterous. In his book he analyses the first news, communicated by CIA and South Korean government: that KAL 007 landed in Sakalin and all passengers are safe. In his careful searches, he discovered the source of this first information. It was published in a Japanese newspaper: Mainichi Shinboun September 1, 1983. According to him, this observation came from Wakkanai radars. So, he considers that another aircraft, probably military, landed at Sakhalin during the "Sakhalin battle" and that its passengers, American and/or South Korean, were jailed in the Soviet Union.

In response to his theories, aeronautics journalist James Oberg, while acknowledging Shifrin's expertise on Soviet prison camps, has stated that Shifrin "got real confused" about the fate of KAL 007. Hans Ephraimson-Abt, a relative of one of the passengers on KAL 007, has called Shifrin a "con man who has no idea how much grief he has caused to families," having been frustrated in his attempts to meet Shifrin's sources.

== Personal life ==
Avraham Shifrin was married to the Israeli politician Eleonora Shifrin. After his emigration to Israel, he resided in Zichron Ya'akov and resided last years of his life in Jerusalem. He died on 1998 and was buried at the Mount of Olives Jewish Cemetery.

== Bibliography ==
- The fourth dimension ("Четвертое измерение", Frankfurt/Main, Posev, 1973, 452 p.)
- USSR Labor Camps. Hearings Before the Subcommittee to Investigate the Administration of the Internal Security Act and Other Internal Security Laws of by Avrrham Shifrin. (Published by Living Sacrifice Book Co. Paperback, 1983, 282 p. ISBN 978-0-88264-159-1)
- Human Cost of Communism (delivered during a panel of the 7th Annual Conference of the World Anti-Communist League, April 8–11, 1974, Washington, D.C. Case Studies on Human Rights and Fundamental Freedoms Volume Two: A World Survey, edited by Willem Adriaan Veenhoven. 1975- Political Science.)
- The First Guidebook to Prisons and Concentration Camps of the Soviet Union by Avraham Shifrin. (Published by Bantam Books, Paperback, 1982, 400 p. Language: English, ISBN 978-0553013924)
