= Stepan Borozenets =

Soviet Air Force Colonel

- Степан Николаевич Борозенец
- Born: 20 August 1922; Aktobe, Kirghiz ASSR, Soviet Union
- Died: 26 August 2016 (aged 94); Chicago, Illinois, U.S.
- Military career
- Allegiance: Soviet Union
- Branch: Soviet Air Force
- Service years: 1941–1978
- Rank: Colonel
- Unit: 569th Attack Aviation Regiment
- Commands: 230th Bomber Aviation Regiment
- Conflicts: World War II
- Awards: Hero of the Soviet Union

Stepan Nikolayevich Borozenets (Russian: Степан Николаевич Борозенец; 20 August 1922 – 26 August 2016) was a Soviet Air Force colonel and a Hero of the Soviet Union.

Borozenets served as an Ilyushin Il-2 ground attack aircraft pilot during World War II, and was awarded the title Hero of the Soviet Union for flying 94 sorties and destroying German equipment. Postwar, he went on to command a bomber aviation regiment before retiring in 1978. In 1995, he went to Chicago for medical treatment and remained in America until his death in 2016.

== Early life ==
Borozenets was born on 20 August 1922 in Aktobe in what is now Ulan District, Kazakhstan, to a Ukrainian peasant family. He graduated from secondary school and the Semipalatinsk flying club.

== Military career ==
In April 1941 he was drafted into the Red Army and sent to the military aviation school of pilots.

In May 1941, he became a cadet at the 1st Orenburg Military Flying Academy named after Kliment Voroshilov, and he graduated in June 1943 with the rank of junior lieutenant. After completing a full course of study, he was sent to the 34th Reserve Aviation Regiment, based at the Dyadkovo airfield north of Dmitrov, Moscow Region. The regiment trained the crews of Il-2 attack aircraft for combat operations.

=== World War II ===
In October 1943, Borozenets was assigned to 4th Assault Aviation Corps of the 4th Air Army within the 1st Belorussian Front. He later assigned to the 4th Assault Air Corps of the 2nd Belorussian Front.

As part of the non-standard reconnaissance aviation squadron of the 4th AAC, repeatedly performed aerial reconnaissance flights He participated in operations to break through the fortified zone and destroy the encircled enemy grouping during the Bobruysk Offensive, in East Prussian Operation, East Pomeranian Offensive and in the breakthrough of the enemy's fortified zone on the western bank of the Oder River.

In July 1944, in a battle near the town of Slonim, Borozenets' aircraft was hit by anti-aircraft fire. He was able to land the burning plane on a railway embankment that crossed the forest, while receiving serious injuries to his face and back. In February 1945, while returning from a combat mission over Poland, his squadron was attacked by a group of 52 enemy fighters. Borozenets' plane was fired upon and as a result, he was wounded and his air gunner Private Leonid Balashenko was killed.

Borozenets flew missions during the Battle of Berlin. Following V-E Day, he was stationed at Rechlin–Lärz Airfield in Berlin.

During World War II, Borozenets flew more 100 missions. He was credited with the destruction of:

- 3 tanks
- 6 locomotives
- 120 railroad cars
- 9 Oil terminal and ammunition depots
- 36 Anti-aircraft and field artillery batteries
- 84 cars

By the decree of the Presidium of the Supreme Soviet of the USSR of August 18, 1945, Lieutenant Borozenets was awarded the title of Hero of the Soviet Union with the Order of Lenin and the Gold Star medal for the heroism shown in combat missions while in command on the front of the struggle against the Nazis .

=== Post war ===
After the war, he continued to serve in the Armed Forces of the USSR. In September 1945, the 569th Assault Aviation Regiment was relocated from Rechlin to an airfield in Brzeg, Poland, where it remained until the end of 1945. Then the personnel of the regiment, leaving their aircraft, was relocated to the Transcaucasian Military District at the Nasosnaya Air Base north of Baku, Azerbaijan SSR.

In April 1946, the 199th Assault Aviation Division was disbanded. Borozenets by that time squadron commander, was offered a transfer to the post of flight commander in the 166th Guards Attack Aviation Regiment, based at the airfield in Kutaisi, Georgian SSR, flying Ilyushin Il-10 aircraft . He held the posts of flight commander, deputy squadron commander and the commander of the squadron.

In 1948 he graduated from the Tambov Higher Aviation Courses for Blind and Night Pilot Training. In September 1952, he entered and in November 1956 graduated from the command and staff faculty of the Gagarin Air Force Academy. During this time, he flew MiG-15s .

After graduating from the academy, he was sent to the 230th Bomber Aviation Regiment of the 32nd Bomber Aviation Division of the Carpathian Military District, based at the Cherlyany Airfield south-west of Lvov, Ukrainian SSR and flying Ilyushin Il-28 jet bombers, then on the Yak-28 tactical bomber. He held the positions of squadron commander, deputy commander and commander of the regiment .

In October 1965, he was transferred to the position of an officer of the combat training department of the headquarters of the 14th Air Army in Lvov. From the summer of 1967 to December 1972, he served in the Southern Group of Forces in Budapest, Hungary, as a senior officer of the combat training department of the headquarters of the 36th Air Army. From 1972 to 1990 he lived in Kharkov, Ukrainian SSR. He worked as a senior lecturer at the Department of Tactics at the Kharkov Higher Military Aviation Pilot School. He retired from military service in 1978.

== Later life ==
He worked as an engineer at the Kharkov Design and Research Institute PromStroyNIIProekt. From 1990 to 1995 he lived in Moscow. He took part in the 1995 Moscow Victory Day Parades, which held in honor of the 50th anniversary of the Soviet victory in World War II and the first post-Soviet military parades held in Russia.

As a result of landing his plane without landing gear on a railway track during World War II, Borozenets seriously injured his spine. He went to Chicago in 1995 for surgery to remove several intervertebral discs. However, he was unable to return to Russia because his health prevented him from flying, and Borozenets' wife and son also moved to Chicago. Retaining his Russian citizenship, he applied for the 36,410 ruble cash payment Heroes of the Soviet Union were entitled to in 2006, but his application was denied because he did not live in Russia. Borozenets appealed to the Constitutional Court of Russia, but the court ruled that veterans living outside of Russia were not eligible for the payment, although it allowed for a personal exemption.

Borozenets died on August 26, 2016, in Chicago, at the age of 94.

== Awards ==
- Hero of the Soviet Union
- Order of Lenin
- Order of the Red Banner
- Three Order of the Patriotic War, 1st class
- Order of the Patriotic War, 2nd class
- Two Order of the Red Star
- Order for Service to the Homeland in the Armed Forces of the USSR 3rd class
- campaign and jubilee medals
