= Henry Ewing =

Henry Ewing may refer to:

- Henry Ewing of 6th Arkansas Field Battery
- Henry W. Ewing, sportsman and coach
- Henry Ellsworth Ewing (1883–1951), arachnologist
- Arthur Henry Ewing (1864–1912), American missionary and academic

== See also ==
- Harry Ewing (disambiguation)
