= TWA Flight 800 conspiracy theories =

Discredited set of theories about TWA Flight 800

TWA Flight 800 conspiracy theories are alternative explanations of the crash of Trans World Airlines Flight 800 (TWA 800) in 1996. The NTSB found that the probable cause of the crash of TWA Flight 800 was an explosion of flammable fuel/air vapors in a fuel tank, most likely from a short circuit. Conspiracy theories claim that the crash was due to a U.S. Navy missile test gone awry, a terrorist missile strike, or an on-board bomb. In 2013, a documentary alleging that the investigation into the crash was a cover-up made news headlines with statements from six members of the original investigation team, now retired, who also filed a petition to reopen the probe.

== Background ==
TWA 800, a Boeing 747-131, was a scheduled international passenger flight from New York City to Rome, with a stopover in Paris. At about 20:31 EDT, on July 17, 1996, about 12 minutes after takeoff from John F. Kennedy International Airport (JFK), TWA 800 exploded and then crashed into the Atlantic Ocean near East Moriches, New York. Of the 230 passengers and crew on board, no survivors were found, making TWA 800 the second-deadliest aircraft accident in the United States at that time.

While investigators from the NTSB arrived on scene the following day, many witnesses to the accident had seen a "streak of light" that was usually described as ascending, moving to a point where a large fireball appeared. There was intense public interest in these witness reports and much speculation that the reported streak of light was from a missile that had struck TWA 800, causing the airplane to explode. Consequently, the Federal Bureau of Investigation (FBI) initiated a parallel criminal investigation alongside the NTSB's accident investigation.

== Search and recovery ==
Pieces of the airplane wreckage were discovered floating on and beneath the surface of the Atlantic Ocean about eight miles south of East Moriches, New York. The main wreckage was found scattered on the ocean floor in an area about 4 miles long by 3 1/2 miles wide. In one of the largest diver-assisted salvage operations ever conducted, over 95 percent of the airplane wreckage was eventually recovered. Recovered wreckage was transported by boat to shore and then by truck to leased hangar space at the former Grumman Aircraft facility in Calverton, New York, for storage, examination, and reconstruction.

== Aspects of conspiracy theories ==
=== Explosives residue ===
As wreckage was recovered, preliminary testing indicated the presence of explosives residue on three samples of material from three separate locations of the recovered airplane wreckage (described by the FBI as consisting of one piece of canvas-like material and two pieces of a floor panel). These samples were submitted to the FBI's laboratory in Washington DC, which determined that the first sample contained traces of cyclotrimethylenetrinitramine (RDX), the second has traces of nitroglycerin, and the third had a combination of RDX and pentaerythritol tetranitrate (PETN). These findings received widespread media attention at the time. While investigators from the FBI viewed these positive tests as strong indications of a criminal act, the NTSB was more cautious, noting the lack of any patterns on the recovered wreckage characteristic of an explosion.

Ultimately, the NTSB was unable to determine the exact source of explosive residues found on the samples of wreckage. The strongest possibilities considered were contamination from the aircraft's use in 1991 transporting troops during the Gulf War, or its use in a training exercise for canine explosive detection about one month before the accident. However, the lack of any other corroborating evidence associated with a high-energy explosion led the NTSB to conclude that "the in-flight breakup of TWA flight 800 was not initiated by a bomb or missile strike".

Meanwhile, TWA's lead 747 pilot - Robert Terrell Stacey, who was participating in the official investigation as a TWA representative - became convinced that a reddish-brown substance observed on the backs of recovered passenger seats was suspicious, and possibly indicated explosive residue or rocket fuel. Stacey began collaborating with a colleague, TWA flight attendant Elizabeth Sanders, and her husband James Sanders, a journalist, to prove this hypothesis. Stacey removed items from the wreckage reconstruction site, particularly samples of seat fabric and documents related to the investigation. In 1997, James Sanders published a book, The Downing of TWA Flight 800, in which he proposed that a missile had destroyed TWA 800 and that the government had covered up the missile in order to avoid public panic. Subsequently, and using information provided by James Sanders, the Riverside Press-Enterprise published a series of articles alleging that the reddish-brown substance was consistent with unexpended rocket fuel from the missile which had struck TWA 800.

The NTSB determined the locations and appearance of the reddish-brown substance found on the seat samples was consistent with an adhesive used in the construction of the seats, a finding confirmed by additional laboratory testing at NASA, yet James Sanders disputed these results.

On December 5, 1997, federal prosecutors charged James Sanders, Elizabeth Sanders, and Robert Stacey with theft of government property. The Sanders' defense attorney, Bruce Maffeo, described the prosecution as "extremely vindictive" and insisted that the couple had a First Amendment right to take the samples and crash-related documents in order to expose the cover-up. In April 1999, both were convicted of stealing evidence from civil aircraft wreckage, and were sentenced to probation; meanwhile, Stacey had plead guilty to a misdemeanor in the case. In 1999, James Sanders authored a second book, Altered Evidence.

=== Radar data ===
==== Unidentified radar tracks ====
One of the earliest, and most widely-reported, criticisms of the official investigation came from President Kennedy's White House Press Secretary and former Senator for California, Pierre Salinger. On November 7, 1996, he held a press conference in Cannes, France, wherein he claimed to have proof both that TWA 800 was shot down by friendly fire and that the government was covering this up. Salinger was quoted saying that "he was basing the claims on information he saw in a document given to him six weeks ago by someone in French Intelligence with close contacts to U.S. officials" but was refusing to name his source. CNN quickly found Salinger's proof was merely "a widely accessible e-mail letter that has been circulating for at least six weeks on the Internet's World Wide Web." Richard Russell, a retired airline pilot, had written the email.

Salinger's statements gained attention and credence partly due to his prior position as the White House Press Secretary for President Kennedy, and partly due to his extensive work as a correspondent for ABC News - particularly his coverage of the 1988 bombing of Pan Am Flight 103 - so that his reputation and authority in American media circles transferred his "internet conspiracies" into the mainstream news. However, his allegations and the 'reports' he issued with his collaborators, quickly became the subject of much scrutiny and overt criticism in the news media. NTSB's Vice Chairman Bob Francis was quoted as saying, "He was an idiot, he didn't know what he was talking about, and he was totally irresponsible." Supporters of Salinger's view included a former Chairman of the Joint Chiefs of Staff, Thomas Moorer, who took out a full-page ad in the New York Times - then the country's largest newspaper - demanding a new Congressional hearing.

=== TWA 800 flightpath after explosion ===
==== Ray Lahr ====
Another proponent of the "friendly fire" (U.S. Navy shoot‐down) theory - and prominent critic of the "zoom climb scenario" - was H. Ray Lahr, a retired United Airlines pilot. Lahr had received the 1994 Laura Taber Barbour Air Safety Award from the Flight Safety Foundation, which lent greater authority and credence to his critiques for many years after the TWA 800 incident.

Ultimately, on November 6, 2003, Lahr filed a Freedom of Information Act (FOIA) suit in federal court seeking documentation and data from both the NTSB and the CIA, which agencies had denied his previous FOIA requests. Lahr wanted the agencies to release their original numbers and methods used to calculate of the zoom climb and, subsequently, used to produce the CIA's incident animation. Asked for his rationale in seeking this information, Lahr replied, "I believe that I could show that the zoom climb never happened. If the zoom climb never happened then they've got to find out what the eyewitnesses saw and the only logical conclusion there is that they saw a missile."

On August 31, 2006, the Court issued an initial ruling that Lahr's evidence justifying for his FOIA lawsuit was "sufficient for the Plaintiff to proceed based on his claim that the government acted improperly," and that Lahr be granted access to some - but not all - of the documents he sought, citing contemporary statutes and precedenta. In a further ruling issued on October 4, 2006, the Court finalized the list of documents which the NTSB and CIA must provide to Lahr - again granting some, but not all, of his FOIA requests. While the Court reaffirmed its initial ruling on Lahr's proof "sufficient to suggest that the government acted improperly", it also clarified; writing that its "conclusion is based on a characterization of the evidence in a light most favorable to the plaintiff, but does not reflect or constitute any finding by the court." Upon being handed this verdict by the court, Lahr asserted that the NTSB and the CIA each claimed that their documents were irretrievably "lost".[23]

=== Bolide strike ===
American amateur geologist Michael Davis proposed in 1997 that a bolide exploded near the airplane. (A bolide is a large meteoroid, explosively torn apart by friction with Earth's atmosphere.)

Davis proposed that the mysterious streak observed just before the incident was the meteoroid's entry path, moments before it exploded. At least one of the resulting bolide's pieces could have penetrated the fuselage and ripped through the almost-empty central wing tank, destroying the wing's structural integrity before exiting the fuselage. "

Although raising an interesting possibility, other scientists dismissed this theory due to the extremely low probability of a bolide's intersecting the aircraft's flight path at precisely the required moment.

On July 10, 1997, NTSB Chairman James Hall testified before the Congressional Subcommittee on Aviation that the bolide hypothesis was not plausible, stating:

"And finally, we are looking at a high speed particle penetration. This scenario involves the possibility that a high speed fragment from a meteorite... could penetrate the center fuel tank and cause ignition. In cooperation with the Federal Bureau of Investigation, we have conducted tests and examination of the wreckage... Specialists from Brook Haven Laboratories on Long Island have assisted us, as have specialists from the Naval Weapons Center at China Lake, California. To date, we have found no evidence of high speed particle penetrations."

=== Electromagnetic interference ===
On April 9, 1998, The New York Review of Books published Elaine Scarry's article, "The Fall of TWA 800: The Possibility of Electromagnetic Interference". A professor of English and American Literature and Language at Harvard, Scarry proposed that electromagnetic interference, particularly those waves called High Intensity Radiated Fields (HIRF) - and specifically HIRF emitted from a U.S. military craft - could have caused the TWA 800 crash.

Later that year, The New York Review of Books published a series of letters between Professor Scarry and NTSB Chairman James Hall discussing the possibility of HIRF causing the accident, and what steps the NTSB was taking in its investigation to determine if military HIRF were a factor.

After the adoption of the final report, the New York Review of Books published Professor Scarry's followup article, "TWA 800 and Electromagnetic Interference: Work Already Completed and Work that Still Needs to be Done". While praising the NTSB's initial research into HIRF, Scarry asserted that significant additional research was needed, criticizing perceived bias in the investigation towards "meticulous" detailing of events inside the airplane without fully exploring the electromagnetic environment in which the airplane was flying. Scarry focused on a U.S. Navy P-3 Orion close to TWA 800 as a possible source of electromagnetic interference capable of causing the CWT explosion aboard TWA 800.

Scarry went on to write about electromagnetic radiation in aviation disasters such as the crash of Swissair Flight 111 and of EgyptAir Flight 990.

== Dissenting views from the investigation ==
=== IAMAW ===
As an invited party to the NTSB investigation, the International Association of Machinists and Aerospace Workers (IAMAW) submitted a report into the public docket, in which the IAMAW disputed the NTSB's sequencing study. They proposed a "major" high-pressure event had "unzipped" the fuselage in a breakup sequence starting on the lower left side of the airplane, writing that "the CWT exploded, but as a result of the airplane's breakup, and was not the initial event."

While commending the NTSB personnel's cooperative attitude, the IAMAW criticized the accuracy of the "Tag database" which documented the recovered wreckage as well as the reliability of the witness statements. Also, the IAMAW strongly criticized the FBI's conduct during the investigation, including the undocumented removal of wreckage from the storage hangar. They concluded, "The causes and circumstances that contributed directly to the accident are unknown."

=== The Donaldson Report ===
Commander William S. Donaldson (US Navy, retired), an aviation accident analyst, formed the Associated Retired Aviation Professionals (ARAP) group to investigate the TWA 800 disaster. On July 17, 1998 - two years before the NTSB released its Final Report - ARAP issued its own "Interim Report on the Crash of TWA Flight 800 and the Actions of the NTSB and the FBI" which became known as The Donaldson Report. In it, ARAP asserted that two missiles fired from the sea had struck TWA 800, most likely as a terrorist attack, and that the FBI and NTSB conspired to cover up this attack due to political pressure.

The Donaldson Report disputed the CWT fuel-air vapor explosion scenario, stating: "In the history of aviation, there has never been an in-flight explosion in any Boeing airliner of a Jet-A kerosene fuel vapor/air mixture in any tank, caused by mechanical failure."

The report cited eyewitness, debris field, metallurgical, and victim injury evidence as proof of the missile-attack scenario. The report acknowledged James Sanders' theory of an accidental military shoot-down, and did not rule out U.S. Navy involvement; however, he viewed circumstantial evidence of a terrorist attack "more compelling".

Missile attacks against civilian flights in 1994 and 1998 may have influenced the Donaldson Report, as did the bestselling 1996 novel Executive Orders by Tom Clancy which describes an attack similar to the theory proposed by Sanders in 1997.

Much of the Donaldson Report dealt with assertions of a conspiratorial cover-up by the FBI and NTSB, abetted the US Department of Justice. Donaldson asserted that the Clinton Administration hid the true cause of the disaster for political reasons such as the pending presidential elections. The Donaldson Report concludes by requesting Congressional hearings into the crash and an Independent Counsel investigation. NTSB Chair James Hall had testified before the Aviation Subcommittee, addressing six popular but discredited theories in the week before the Donaldson Report.

Commander Donaldson received support and funding from the advocacy group Accuracy in Media which promoted his views. He died in 2001 of a brain tumor; his supporters continued to engage with the government until 2008.

== Public acceptance of conspiracy theories ==
As of 1998, only about half of Americans accepted the NTSB's conclusion that the crash was the result of a mechanical malfunction. According to the rhetorician Shane Miller, the widespread acceptance of conspiracy theories is a result of a lack of solid evidence of the direct cause of the source of ignition for the center fuel tank explosion. The heavy redaction of FBI interviews with witnesses also contributed to public doubt of official explanation.

== Documentary ==
On July 17, 2013, the 17th anniversary of the tragedy, the Epix premium TV channel aired a documentary entitled TWA Flight 800. Directed by Kristina Borjesson, the film alleges that the crash investigation was a cover-up. The film features extensive eyewitness interviews, with many eyewitnesses objecting to popular characterization of their recollections; interviews with six original investigators who filed a petition to reopen the official investigation based on eyewitness accounts, radar evidence of missiles, and concerns of evidence tampering; plus former NTSB investigator Henry Hughes, who asserts a bomb or a missile caused the crash.

== Litigation ==
On 19 September 2022, the families of 15 victims filed Krick et al v. Raytheon Corporation alleging the cause of the flight's explosion was the testing of the Aegis Combat System (Aegis). The lawsuit alleges that the Aegis fired RIM-66 Standard type SM-2 missiles at aerial targets in close proximity to commercial flight paths, causing a friendly fire incident which the Department of Defense and the FBI covered up.

On 12 October 2023, the Court denied the Defendants' request to have the lawsuit dismissed. The case remains in litigation as of 30 April 2026.

== See also ==
- Korean Air Lines Flight 007 (September 1983) alternative theories
