= 1995 Moscow Victory Day Parades =

Russian military parade

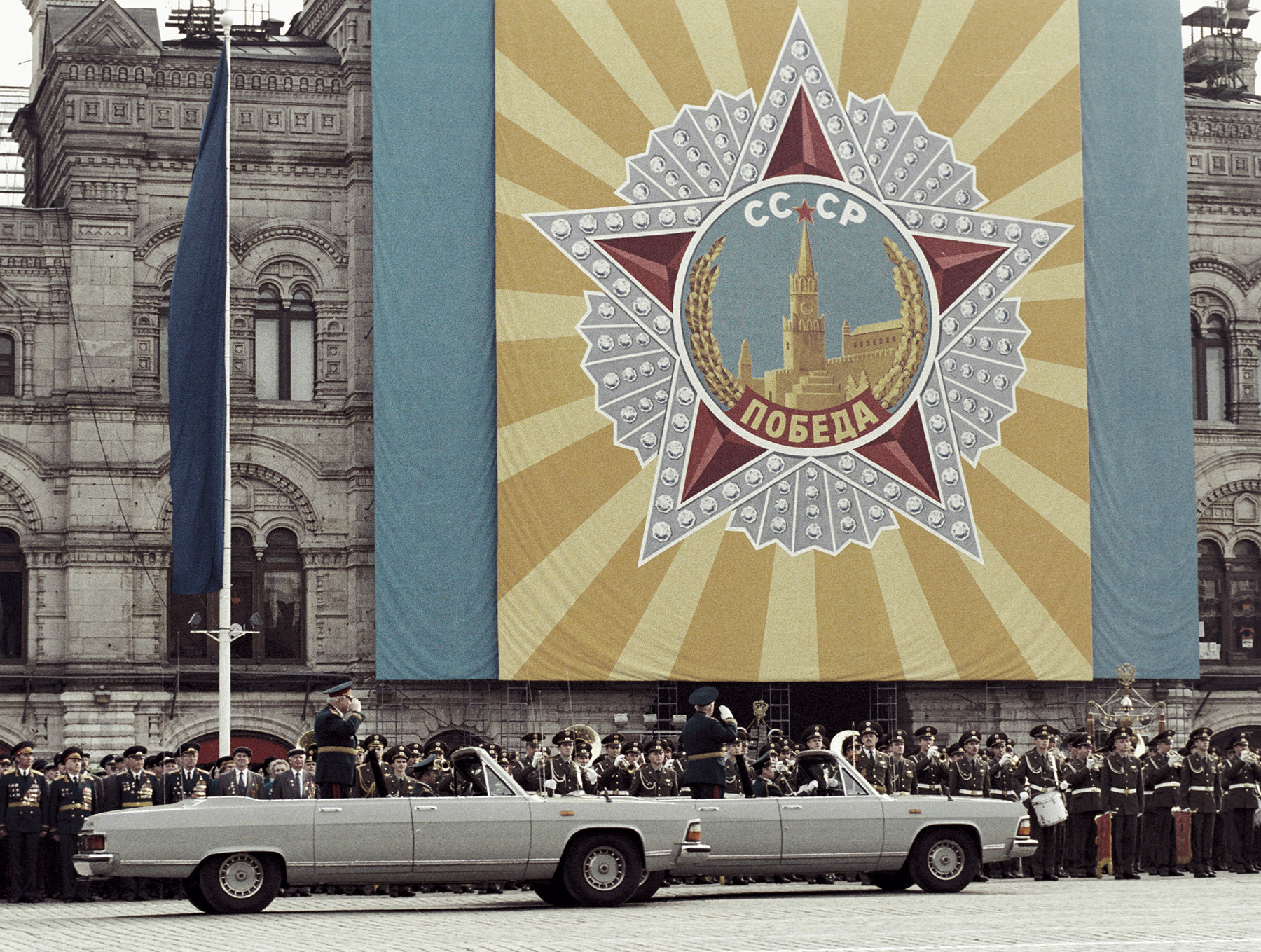
General of the Army Vladimir Govorov, and Marshal Victor Kulikov inspecting the parade.

The 1995 Moscow Victory Day Parades (Russian: Парад Победы, romanized: Parad Pobedy) were two military parades held on 9 May 1995 to commemorate the historic 50th anniversary golden jubilee of the capitulation of Nazi Germany to the Soviet Union in 1945. The parades marked the Soviet Union's victory in the Great Patriotic War. These were the first post-Soviet military parades held in Russia the first one being in held for veterans on Red Square at 8:00 in the morning followed by another parade of infantry and military equipment at Poklonnaya Hill at 3:00 in the afternoon.

== Poklonnaya Hill Parade ==
The Poklonnaya Parade was the first parade in the post-Soviet era and the only one in the Yeltsin era to feature military hardware, which would not be displayed again until 2008.

The parade was observed by Russian leaders and foreign dignitaries from a provisional facade. Major political figures attending were President of the Russian Federation Boris Yeltsin, First Lady Naina Yeltsina, and Prime Minister Viktor Chernomyrdin. The parade was inspected by Minister of Defence General of the Army Pavel Grachev, who later made the keynote address (the last time that the Minister of Defense made such an address on a national parade) and commanded by Moscow Military District Commander Colonel General Leonid Kuznetsov. It was on that very parade where Russian soldiers paraded with new post-Soviet military uniforms. It was the first time since 1957 that aviation took part in the parade.

Among the new additions that debuted were the BMP-3, BMD-3, S-300 missile system, BM-30 Smerch and the 2S19 Msta SPG.

=== Full order of the parade in the Poklonnaya Hill complex ===
- General of the Army Pavel Grachev (parade reviewing inspector)
- Colonel General Leonid Kuznetsov (parade commander)

==== Military bands ====
- Massed Military Bands of the Moscow Military District

==== Ground column ====
- Corps of Drums of the Moscow Military Music College
- Victory Banner Color Guard
- Front Standards
- Colour guard battalion of regimental, brigade and division colors of the Soviet Army
- 1st Honor Guard Company, Independent Commandant's Regiment
- Historical regiment
- M. V. Frunze Military Academy
- Military University of the Ministry of Defense of Russia
- Peter the Great Military Academy of the Strategic Missile Forces
- Military Armored Forces Academy Marshal Rodion Malinovsky
- Military Engineering Academy
- Military Academy of Chemical Defense and Control
- Yuri Gagarin Air Force Academy
- Prof. Nikolai Zhukovsky Air Force Engineering Academy
- St. Petersburg Naval Institute
- Ryazan Guards Higher Airborne Command School (first appearance)
- 98th Guards Airborne Division
- Moscow Border Guards Institute of the Federal Border Guard Service "Moscow City Council"
- 366th Guards Naval Infantry Brigade of the Baltic Fleet
- OMSDON Ind. Motorized Division of the Internal Troops of the Ministry of Internal Affairs of Russia "Felix Dzerzhinsky"
- Suvorov Military School
- Nakhimov Naval School
- Moscow Military High Command Training School "Supreme Soviet of Russia"

== Red Square Parade ==
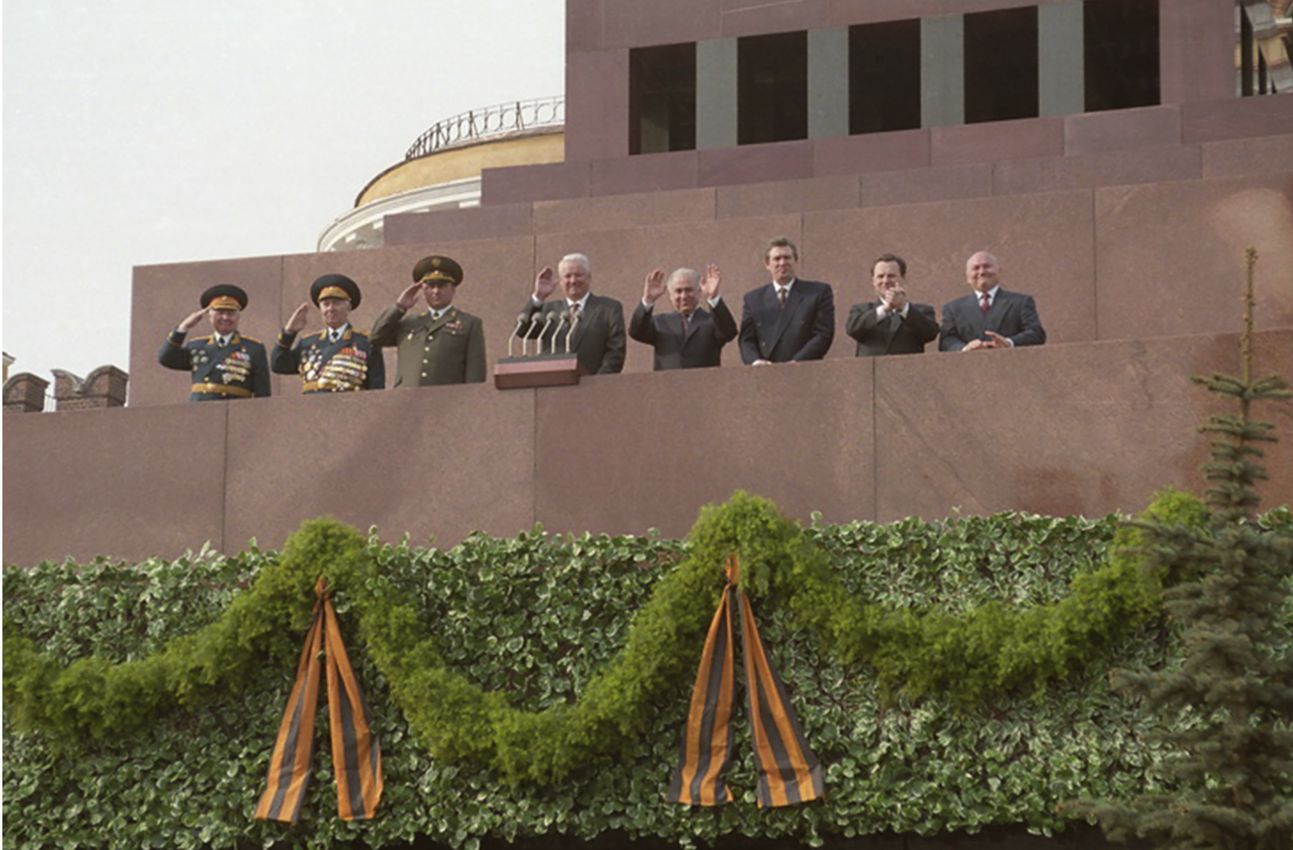
Boris Yeltsin on Lenin's Mausoleum

The Red Square Parade was another parade held in post-Soviet and in the Yeltsin era but did not feature military hardware, which would not be displayed again until 2008. This parade would feature all surviving veterans from all fronts marching past Red Square. The parade was observed by Russian leaders from Lenin's Mausoleum and more than 50 world leaders, most notably United Nations Secretary General Boutros Boutros-Ghali, European Commission President Jacques Santer, United States president Bill Clinton, Canadian prime minister Jean Chretien, British prime minister John Major, Chinese leader Jiang Zemin, Azerbaijani president Heydar Aliyev and Uzbek president Islam Karimov. Major political figures attending were President of the Russian Federation Boris Yeltsin and Prime Minister Viktor Chernomyrdin. The parade was inspected by retired Marshal of the Soviet Union Viktor Kulikov and commanded by retired General of the Army Vladimir Govorov. In this parade, Russian president Boris Yeltsin delivered his first Victory Day address. This parade was also the only to feature and show the Iberian Gate and Chapel under construction on Red Square, which was later finished the following year. Among the notable veteran participants was pilot Stepan Borozenets.

=== Full order of the parade on Red Square ===
- Marshal Viktor Kulikov (parade reviewing inspector)
- General of the Army Vladimir Govorov (parade commander)

==== Military bands ====
- Massed Military Bands of the Moscow Military District

==== Ground column ====
- Victory Banner Color Guard
- Corps of Drums of the Moscow Military Music College
- Colour guard battalion of regimental, brigade and division colors of the Red Army
- Historical regiment
- Veterans contingents
  - Karelian Front
  - Leningrad Front
  - 1st Baltic Front
  - 1st Belorussian Front
  - 2nd Belorussian Front
  - 3rd Belorussian Front
  - 1st Ukrainian Front
  - 2nd Ukrainian Front
  - 3rd Ukrainian Front
  - 4th Ukrainian Front
- Suvorov Military School
- Nakhimov Naval School
- M. V. Frunze Military Academy
- Military University of the Ministry of Defense of Russia
- Peter the Great Military Academy of the Strategic Missile Forces
- Military Armored Forces Academy Marshal Rodion Malinovsky
- 336th Guards Naval Infantry Brigade
- OMSDON Ind. Motorized Division of the Internal Troops of the Ministry of Internal Affairs of Russia "Felix Dzerzhinsky"
- Russian Airborne Forces
- Moscow Border Guards Institute of the Federal Border Guard Service "Moscow City Council"
- Moscow Military High Command Training School "Supreme Soviet of Russia"

== Dignitaries in attendance ==
In March 1995, White House Press Secretary Mike McCurry announced a state visit by President Bill Clinton to Russia on 9 and 10 May to attend the celebrations as well as another visit to Ukraine on 11 May. One of the largest gathering of world leaders in Russian history, the 1995 parade was attended by a total of 56 foreign heads of state and government, along with 6 multilateral leaders.

- Boutros Boutros-Ghali, the Secretary-General of the United Nations
- Javier Solana, the secretary general of NATO
- (Commonwealth of Independent States) Ivan Korotchenya, the secretary general of CIS
- Cornelio Sommaruga, the president of the International Committee of the Red Cross
- Federico Mayor Zaragoza, the Director General of UNESCO
- (European Union) Jacques Santer, the president of the European Commission
- Tomiichi Murayama, the prime minister of Japan
- Yitzhak Rabin, the prime minister of Israel
- Jean Chretien, the prime minister of Canada
- Hosni Mubarak, the president of Egypt
- Bill Clinton, the president of the United States of America and First Lady Hillary Clinton
- Jiang Zemin, the general secretary of the Chinese Communist Party and President of China
- John Major, the prime minister of the United Kingdom
- François Mitterrand, the president of France
- Marc Forne Molne, the prime minister of Andorra
- Helmut Kohl, the Federal Chancellor of Germany
- Manfred Gerlach, the former president of East Germany
- Jean-Claude Juncker, the prime minister of Luxembourg
- Poul Nyrup Rasmussen, the prime minister of Denmark
- Gro Harlem Brundtland, the prime minister of Norway
- Árpád Göncz, the president of Hungary
- Felipe González, the prime minister of Spain
- Mario Soares, the president of Portugal
- Ingvar Carlsson, the prime minister of Sweden
- Vigdis Finnbogadottir, the president of Iceland
- (Republic of Ireland) Mary Robinson, the president of Ireland
- Massimo D’Alema, the prime minister of Italy
- Wim Kok, the prime minister of the Netherlands
- Thomas Klestil, the president of Austria
- Pascal Couchepin, the chancellor of Switzerland
- Zhelyu Zhelev, the president of Bulgaria
- Edward Fenech Adami, the prime minister of Malta
- Glafcos Klerides, the president of Cyprus
- Ion Iliescu, the president of Romania
- Punsalmaagiin Ochirbat, the president of Mongolia
- Konstantinos Stephanopoulos, the president of Greece
- Martti Ahtisaari, the president of Finland
- Jean-Luc Dehaene, the prime minister of Belgium
- Tansu Çiller, the prime minister of Turkey
- Rainier III, the Sovereign Prince of Monaco
- Michael Ritter, the deputy prime minister of Liechtenstein
- (Serbia and Montenegro) Zoran Lilić, the president of Yugoslavia
- Franjo Tudman, the president of Croatia
- (North Macedonia) Kiro Gligorov, the president of Macedonia
- Alija Izetbegović, the president of Bosnia and Herzegovina
- Radovan Karadžić, the president of Republika Srpska
- Milan Kučan, the president of Slovenia
- Michal Kováč, the president of Slovakia
- Václav Havel, the president of the Czech Republic
- Aleksander Kwaśniewski, Leader of the Social Democracy of the Republic of Poland
- Leonid Kuchma, the president of Ukraine
- Heydar Aliyev, the president of Azerbaijan
- Levon Ter-Petrosyan, the president of Armenia
- Sali Berisha, the president of Albania
- (Georgia (country)) Eduard Shevardnadze, the president of Georgia
- Nursultan Nazarbayev, the president of Kazakhstan
- Askar Akayev, the president of Kyrgyzstan
- Mircea Snegur, the president of Moldova
- Saparmurat Niyazov, the president of Turkmenistan
- Emomali Rahmon, the president of Tajikistan
- Islam Karimov, the president of Uzbekistan
- Rafic Hariri, the prime minister of Lebanon
- Lee Hong-koo, the prime minister of South Korea
- (India) Pranab Mukherjee, the Minister of External Affairs
- Lê Đức Anh, the president of Vietnam
- John Howard, the Leader of the Opposition of Australia
- Don McKinnon, the foreign minister of New Zealand

Also present were dozens of Foreign Diplomats and representatives of all Second World War veterans from the European and Mediterranean Theaters of Operations.

== Music ==
=== Music for Red Square parade ===
Review and Address

- Jubilee Slow March "25 Years of the Red Army" (Юбилейный встречный марш "25 лет РККА) by Semeon Tchernetsky
- Slow March of the Officers Schools (Встречный Марш офицерских училищ) by Semyon Tchernetsky)
- March of the Preobrazhensky Regiment (Марш Преображенского Полка)
- Slow March of the Guards of the Navy (Гвардейский Встречный Марш Военно-Морского Флота) by Nikolai Pavlocich Ivanov-Radkevich
- Glory (Славься) by Mikhail Glinka
- Parade Fanfare May 9 (Парадная Фанфара “9 Мая”) by Nikolai Camokhvalov
- State Anthem of the Russian Federation (Patriotic Song) – Государственный Гимн Российской Федерации (Патриотическая Песня) by Mikhail Glinka
- Fanfare

Veteran and Infantry Column

- We are the Army of the People (Мы Армия Народа) by Georgy Viktorovich Mavsesyan
- Sacred War (Священная война) by Alexander Alexanderov
- Farewell of Slavianka (Прощание Славянки) by Vasiliy Agapkin
- March Victory (Марш “Победа”) by Albert Mikhailovich Arutyunov
- March from the theme of the song On an Unknown Hill (Марш на темы песни “На безымянной высоте”)
- In the Dugout (В землянке) by Alexei Surkov
- We Need One Victory (Нам Нужна Одна Победа) by Bulat Shalvovich Okudzhava
- In Defense of the Homeland (В защиту Родины) by Viktor Sergeyevich Runov
- On Guard for the Peace (На страже Мира) by Boris Alexanderovich Diev
- Combat March (Строевой Марш) by Dmitry Illarionovich Pertsev
- On the Road (В Путь) by Vasily Pavlovich Solovyov-Sedoy

Conclusion

- Bow to those Great Years (Поклонимся Великим Тем Годам) by Iosif Kobzon
- 1812 Overture Finale (Soviet version) by Tchaikovsky
- Victory Day (День Победы) by David Fyodorovich Tukhmanov

=== Music for Poklonnaya Hill parade ===
Review and Address

- Jubilee Slow March "25 Years of the Red Army" (Юбилейный встречный марш "25 лет РККА) by Semeon Tchernetsky
- Slow March of the Officers Schools (Встречный Марш офицерских училищ) by Semyon Tchernetsky
- Slow March of the Tankmen (Встречный Марш Танкистов) by Semyon Tchernetsky
- Slow March of the Guards of the Navy (Гвардейский Встречный Марш Военно-Морского Флота) by Nikolai Pavlocich Ivanov-Radkevich
- March of the Preobrazhensky Regiment (Марш Преображенского Полка) by Unknown
- Slow March of the Officers Schools (Встречный Марш офицерских училищ) by Semyon Tchernetsky
- Slow March of the Guards of the Navy (Гвардейский Встречный Марш Военно-Морского Флота) by Nikolai Pavlocich Ivanov-Radkevich
- Slow March (Встречный Марш) by Dmitry Pertsev
- Slow March of the Red Army (Встречный Марш Красной Армии) by Semyon Tchernetsky
- Glory (Славься) by Mikhail Glinka
- Parade Fanfare May 9 (Парадная Фанфара “9 Мая”) by Nikolai Camokhvalov
- State Anthem of the Russian Federation (Patriotic Song) – Государственный Гимн Российской Федерации (Патриотическая Песня) by Mikhail Glinka
- Fanfare

Infantry Column

- Victory Day (День Победы) by David Fyodorovich Tukhmanov
- Farewell of Slavianka (Прощание Славянки) by Vasiliy Agapkin
- In Defense of the Homeland (В защиту Родины) by Viktor Sergeyevich Runov
- On Guard for the Peace (На страже Мира) by Boris Alexanderovich Diev
- Combat March (Строевой Марш) by Dmitry Illarionovich Pertsev
- Air March (Авиамарш) by Yuliy Abramovich Khait
- Leningrad (Ленинград) by Viktor Sergeyeich Runov
- We are the Army of the People (Мы Армия Народа) by Georgy Viktorovich Mavsesyan
- Sports March (Спортивный Марш) by Valentin Volkov
- On the Road (В Путь) by Vasily Pavlovich Solovyov-Sedoy

Air Column

- Air March (Авиамарш) by Yuliy Abramovich Khait
- Legendary Sevastopol (Легендарный Севастополь) by Bano Muradeli

Vehicle Column

- Victorious March (Победный Марш) by Nikolai Pavlocich Ivanov-Radkevich
- Salute to Moscow (Салют Москвы) by Semyon Tchernetsky
- My Dear Capital/My Moscow (Дорогая Моя Столица/Моя Москва) by Isaac Dunayevsky
