= Ulan District =

Coordinates: 49°52′37″N 82°29′04″E

Ulan
- District
- Ұлан ауданы
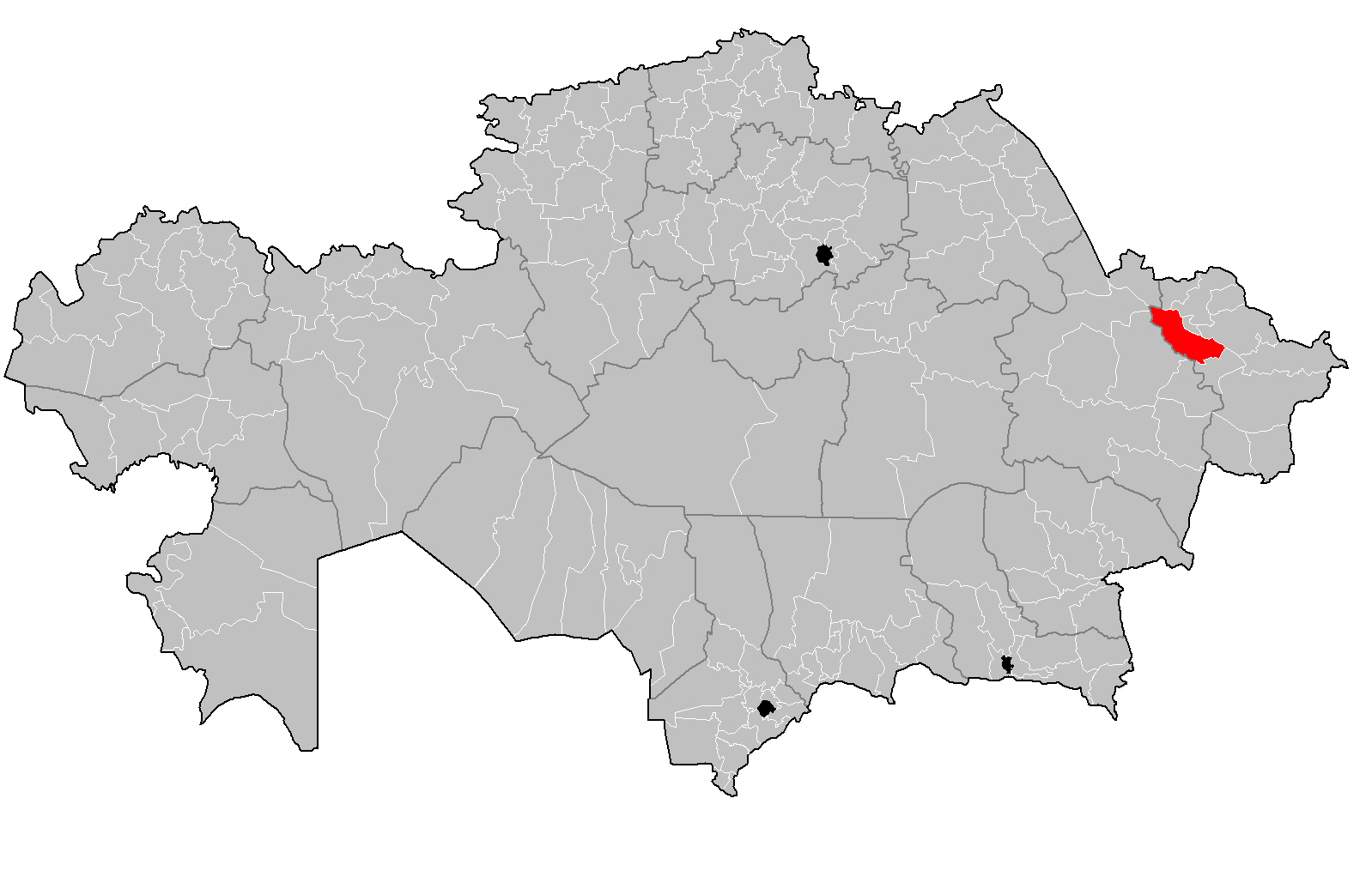
- Country: Kazakhstan
- Region: East Kazakhstan Region
- Administrative center: Kassym Kaisenov
- Founded: 1928

Government
  - Akim: Kurmambaev Renat Tleukhanovich

Area
  - Total: 9,160 km^{2} (3,540 sq mi)

Population (2013)
  - Total: 40,482
- Time zone: UTC+6 (East)

Ulan (Kazakh: Ұлан ауданы, Ūlan audany) is a district of East Kazakhstan Region, Kazakhstan. The administrative center of the district is the settlement of Kassym Kaisenov (formerly named Molodyozhny). Population: 40,482 (2013 estimate); 39,079 (2009 census results); 45,699 (1999 census results).
