= Kristina Borjesson =

American journalist

- Born: December 18,1954; Parlin, New Jersey, US
- Died: December 29, 2023 (aged 69); Sayreville, New Jersey, US
- Occupation: Freelance Journalist

Kristina Borjesson was an American freelance journalist.

Borjesson attended Boston University and Columbia University School of Journalism.

She edited an award-winning collection of essays, Into the Buzzsaw: Leading Journalists Expose the Myth of a Free Press (2002), for which she wrote a chapter detailing her investigation of the TWA Flight 800 crash. Into the Buzzsaw won the Arthur Rowse Award for Press Criticism and an Independent Publishers Award in the current events category. The book was also a New York Public Library "Books to Remember"selection. Borjesson's second book, Feet to the Fire: The Media After 9/11, Top Journalists Speak Out contains a series of interviews with distinguished American journalists and news executives discussing the problems of press coverage of the run-up to the Iraq War as well as the war itself. Feet to the Fire also won the Independent Publishers Award in the current events category.

In July 2013, TWA Flight 800, a feature-length investigative film Borjesson wrote, produced and directed, was released on the Epix premium cable channel. In the film, former members of the original government investigation into the mid-air explosion of a 747 off the coast of Long Island, New York on July 17, 1996, come forward to discuss how the original investigation was undermined. They also present forensic evidence showing what happened to the jetliner. Previously, Borjesson won an Emmy for investigative reporting and a Murrow award for her work as Field Producer/Reporter for the CBS Reports documentary, "Legacy of Shame," updating CBS's signature documentary on migrant farmworkers, "Harvest of Shame" with Edward R. Murrow. Borjesson also produced and co-wrote the CBS Reports biography of Cuba's Fidel Castro titled "The Last Revolutionary," which was Emmy-nominated. For CNN's "NewsStand" show, she produced several lead pieces, including a two-part investigation of the business practices of Hollywood agents and managers.

In September 2013, Borjesson released on Amazon Kindle her first work of fiction, The Reptile Club Librarian, a book based on the life of a man who spent most of his professional life working both sides of the law. She hosted The Whistleblower Newsroom, a one-hour radio show that aired on the Progressive Radio Network.

Kristina Borjesson died December 29, 2023.

== Books ==
- Editor, Into the Buzzsaw: Leading Journalists Expose the Myth of a Free Press. ISBN 1-57392-972-7 (Prometheus Books, hardcover, 2002); ISBN 1-59102-230-4 (Prometheus Books, revised and expanded paperback, 2004).
- Author, FEET TO THE FIRE: The Media After 9/11, Top Journalists Speak Out, ISBN 1-59102-343-2 (Prometheus Books, hardcover, 2005).
- Author, The Reptile Club Librarian. ASIN B00F2MRSE2 (Amazon Kindle, 2013)
