= TWA Flight 800 (1964) =

1964 aviation accident

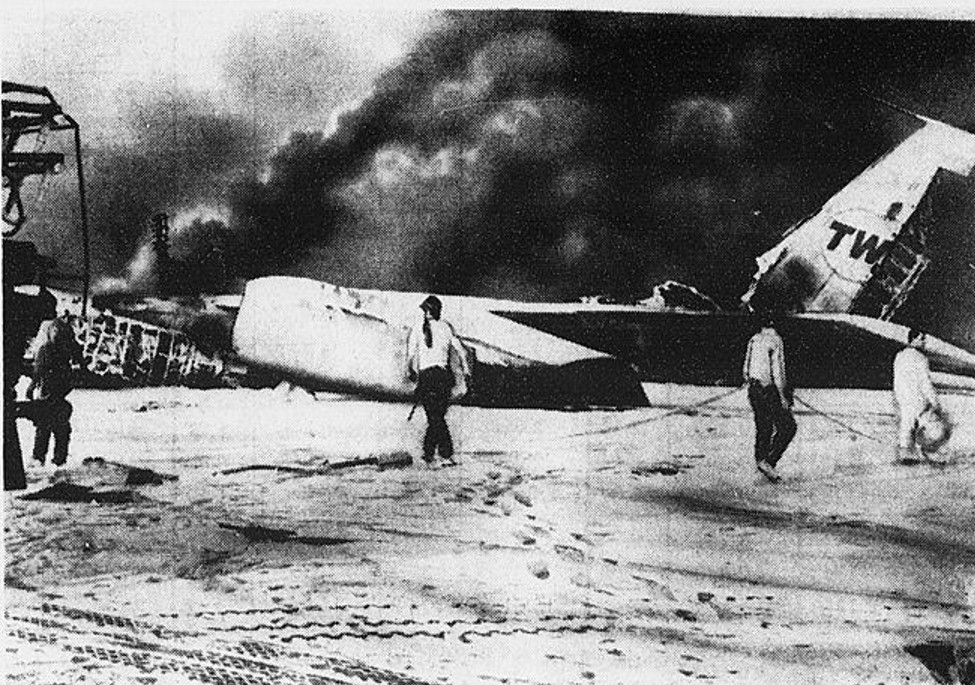
- The accident site

Occurrence
- Date: November 23, 1964
- Summary: Thrust reverser malfunction followed by runway excursion
- Site: Leonardo da Vinci–Fiumicino Airport, Rome, Italy; 41°48′10″N 12°14′15″E

Aircraft
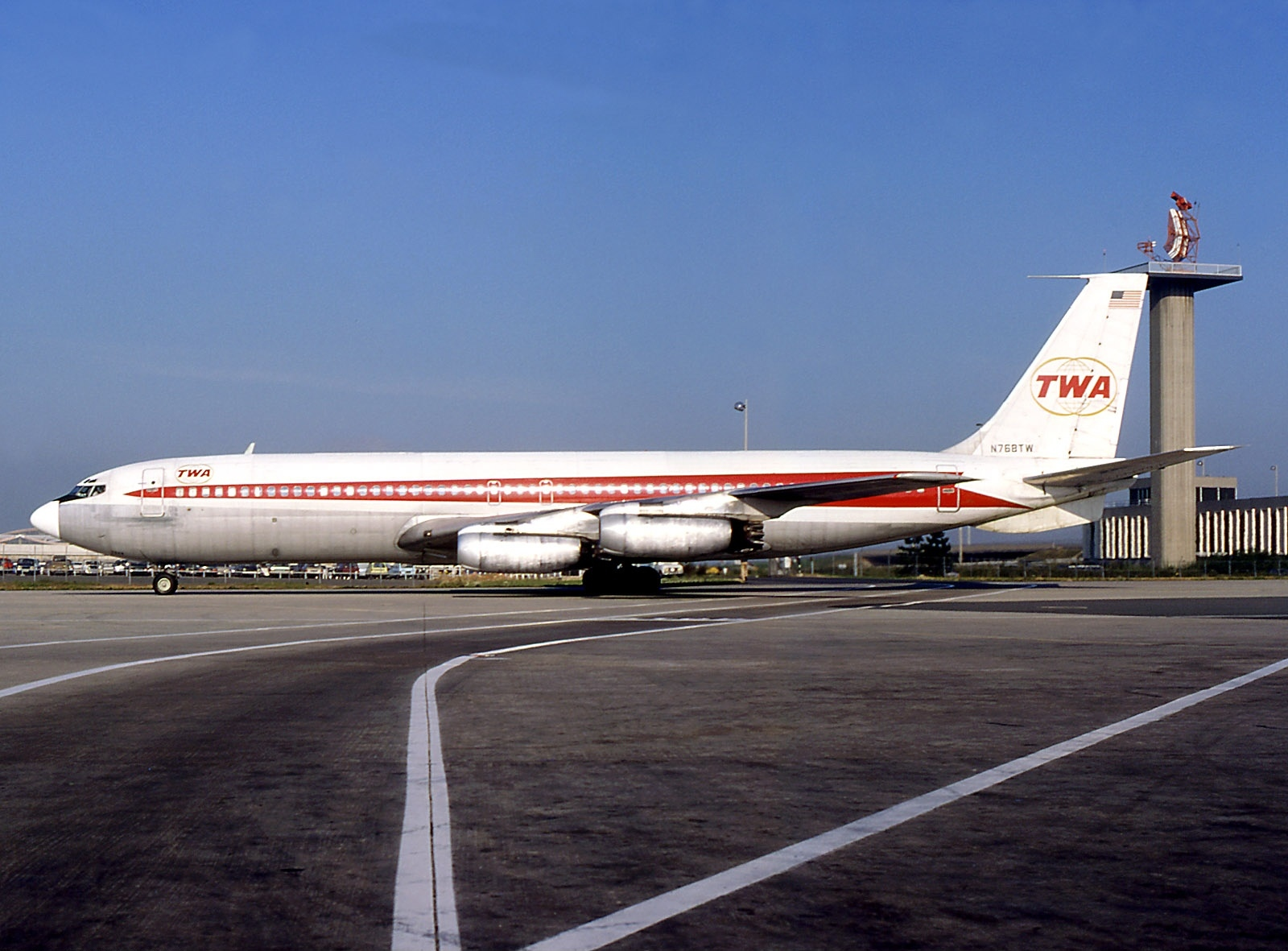
- A TWA Boeing 707-331, N768TW, sister ship to the accident aircraft
- Aircraft type: Boeing 707-331
- Operator: Trans World Airlines
- Registration: N769TW
- Flight origin: Charles B. Wheeler Downtown Airport, Kansas City, Missouri, United States
- 1st stopover: O'Hare International Airport, Chicago, Illinois, United States
- 2nd stopover: John F. Kennedy International Airport, New York City, United States
- 3rd stopover: Orly Airport, Paris, France
- 4th stopover: Milan Malpensa Airport, Milan, Italy
- 5th stopover: Leonardo da Vinci–Fiumicino Airport, Rome, Italy
- 6th stopover: Ellinikon International Airport, Athens, Greece
- Destination: Cairo International Airport, Cairo, Egypt
- Occupants: 73
- Passengers: 62
- Crew: 11
- Fatalities: 49
- Injuries: 20
- Survivors: 24

Trans World Airlines Flight 800 was an international scheduled passenger service from Kansas City, Missouri, to Cairo, Egypt via Chicago, New York City, Paris, Milan, Rome, and Athens. The Boeing 707 caught fire following a rejected takeoff on runway 25 at Leonardo da Vinci–Fiumicino Airport, Rome, at 13:09 GMT on a flight to Athens International Airport, Greece, on November 23, 1964, killing 49 of the 73 people on board.

== Aircraft and crew ==
The aircraft was a 4.5-year-old Boeing 707-331, registered N769TW. On board were 62 passengers and 11 crew. The flight crew consisted of Captain Vernon W. Lowell (44), an experienced pilot with 17,408 logged hours, 2,617 of those in the Boeing 707. The first officer was William A. Slaughter (46), who had 17,419 hours overall and 1,269 on the 707. Second Officer John W. Churchill (41) was the least experienced crew member, with 9,928 hours in total and 1,920 hours on the 707. The flight engineer, H. W. Lowery (47), had a total of 14,231 hours with 1,308 of those on the type. There were also six flight attendants and one extra crew member in the cockpit.

== Incident ==
At the time of the accident, maintenance work was being carried out at the end of runway 25, with the last 2,000 feet of the runway closed. As the aircraft reached 80 knots during its takeoff roll, the instruments for engine number 4 indicated zero thrust. The flight crew assumed that this engine had failed. Seconds later, the Reverser Unlock light for engine number 2 illuminated. Since the aircraft was below its V_{1}, the safest course of action was to abort the takeoff, which was done when the aircraft was around 800 metres (2,600 ft) along the runway. This was accomplished by ordering full reverse thrust on all engines, as well as deploying their thrust reversers. The aircraft began to slow down, but not as quickly as expected; Captain Lowell also had great difficulty maintaining directional control.

The 707 overran the declared end of the runway and struck a compactor crossing the runway, damaging the number 4 engine and starting a fire on the right wing. The aircraft eventually stopped a further 260 metres (850 ft) down the runway, and an evacuation began. Only seconds after coming to a stop, the center fuel tank exploded. The evacuation was greatly impeded by smoke and flames blocking most of the passenger exits. More explosions followed, including that of the number 1 fuel tank. Only 24 out of the 73 people on board survived. Captain Lowell and Second Officer Churchill were among the survivors. A prominent fatality was passenger the Most Reverend Edward Celestin Daly, OP, Bishop of the Roman Catholic Diocese of Des Moines, Iowa, who had just participated in Vatican Council II.

One passenger died of her injuries over a month after the accident. The final report listed her injuries as serious.

== Cause ==
The root cause of the accident was determined to be an inoperative number 2 engine reverse thrust system, even though cockpit instruments showed that the reverser had deployed. This was caused by the disconnection of a duct, resulting in a lack of pressure in the pneumatic clamshell door actuating mechanism. This malfunction allowed the development of considerable forward thrust by number 2 engine, even though the thrust levers for all four engines were in the "reverse" position, which both increased the plane's stopping distance as well as giving it a tendency to steer to the right.

The amount of available runway was judged safe as required by the Boeing 707 for takeoff, rejected takeoff or landing. But no allowances were made for an aircraft that was not functioning normally, as in the case of Flight 800. Thus the thrust asymmetry resulted in aircraft being unable to stop before the end of the declared runway available and avoid the compactor.

Despite the crew following proper procedures for a rejected takeoff (powering down engines and hydraulic systems) after the aircraft halted, fuel leaking from the wing tanks connected to the damaged pylon caught fire, likely due to exposed and sparking electrical wiring caused by the damage. After being informed of the fire. the crew activated the engine fire-suppression systems, but this had no effect, as the fuel and flames had already spread to the point that they hindered evacuation efforts. Eventually the fire reached the fuselage fuel tanks, which were mostly empty except for volatile fuel vapors that ignited and exploded, destroying the aircraft.

Captain Lowell would go on to become a passionate advocate for improved safety in the aviation industry following this accident, and in 1967 wrote a book, Airline Safety is a Myth, in which he detailed the accident. Many of his suggestions were subsequently implemented.
