= Eleonora Shifrin =

Israeli politician (born 1948)

Eleonora Shifrin (Hebrew: אלאונורה שיפרין; 1948 - 2021) was chairwoman of the Yamin Yisrael party, and news editor for SedmoyKanal.com, the Russian-language website for Arutz Sheva.

Shifrin was born in Kiev (at the time a city in the Soviet Union, now the capital of Ukraine). She is a long time activist who fought to foster Jewish immigration from the Soviet Union to Israel and currently stands as the Russian-speaking representative of Jonathan Pollard.

For the 2003 Knesset elections Yamin Yisrael allied itself to Herut – The National Movement. Shifrin won fifth place on the alliance's Knesset list, but it failed to cross the electoral threshold. For the 2006 elections the party formed an alliance with the Jewish National Front with Shifrin sixth on the alliance's list. It too failed to cross the electoral threshold.

Shifrin passed away on the 6th of August 2021.
