= Hans Ephraimson-Abt =

German-American businessman and advocate

- Ephraimson-Abt in 1997
- Born: Hans Eduard Ephraimson-Abt; 7 March 1922; Berlin, Weimar Republic
- Died: 18 October 2013 (aged 91); Short Hills, New Jersey, U.S.
- Occupations: Businessperson, advocate for the victims of aviation accidents
- Spouse: Christine Anger (divorced)
- Children: 3

Hans Eduard Ephraimson-Abt (7 March 1922 – 18 October 2013) was a German-American businessman. After the death of his daughter on Korean Air Lines Flight 007 in 1983, he became a leading figure in advocating support systems and securing legislative changes for families affected by aviation accidents.

== Early life ==
Ephraimson-Abt was born on 7 March 1922, in Berlin, Germany, to a Jewish family. Following the rise of Nazi Germany, he pursued studies in hotel management in Switzerland, where he remained during World War II, residing in several refugee camps due to his status as a Jewish refugee. This experience developed his fluency in German, French, English, and other European languages, which later facilitated his international advocacy work. In 1945, after the war, he briefly returned to Germany before immigrating to the United States in 1950 to reunite with his parents, who had earlier escaped Nazi persecution. He settled in New York, where he became a naturalized American citizen.

== Career ==
He initially served as the director of the press department for the consulate of West Germany in New York, a role that utilized his multilingual skills and knowledge of German-American relations. In the 1960s, he transitioned to a career as an international business consultant, specializing in cross-border trade and negotiations. His professional experience included work with European and American firms.

=== Air accidents' victims advocate ===
On 1 September 1983, while en route from New York City to Seoul, South Korea, with stopover in Anchorage, Alaska, Korean Air Lines Flight 007, a Boeing 747-230B carrying 246 passengers and 23 crew was shot down over Moneron Island by the Soviet Air Force, after the airliner deviated from its original planned route and flew through Soviet prohibited airspace, killing all on board. Among the passengers onboard the flight was Ephraimson-Abt's daughter Alice, an East Asian studies graduate of Wittenberg University, who was traveling to Beijing, via Seoul and then Hong Kong, to teach English and study Mandarin at Renmin University of China. Many families, including Ephraimson-Abt, were not directly informed by the airline. Instead, he learned of the shootdown from a hotel manager in Hong Kong whom he had asked to assist Alice upon her arrival. When he contacted Korean Air Lines for information, the airline abruptly ended the call, offering no assistance or details.

Motivated by the lack of communication and support from Korean Air Lines in the aftermath of the KAL 007 incident, Ephraimson-Abt co-founded the American Association for Families of KAL 007 Victims in 1983, serving as its chairman. He met with 149 State Department officials, visited Washington over 250 times, and helped influence major changes, including improved airline liability standards and the establishment of the National Transportation Safety Board's family assistance role. Prior to the dissolution of the Soviet Union, Ephraimson-Abt secured the support of Senators Ted Kennedy, Sam Nunn, Carl Levin and Bill Bradley, who jointly wrote to Soviet President Mikhail Gorbachev requesting details about KAL 007. The organization later expanded into the Air Crash Victims Family Group to support families affected by other aviation disasters.

In 1996, he contributed to the passage of the Aviation Disaster Family Assistance Act, which assigned the National Transportation Safety Board (NTSB) and the American Red Cross the responsibility of coordinating support for families of the victims of aviation accidents. In 1997, he helped negotiate an international agreement under the International Civil Aviation Organization (ICAO) that increased the liability limit for airlines in international crashes from US$75,000 to $139,000 per passenger, reducing the need for families to prove airline misconduct in court. At the 38th ICAO Assembly in Montreal in 2013, his efforts culminated in the adoption of a formal policy on assistance to air accident victims and their families, establishing global standards for post-crash support.

In 1992, Ephraimson-Abt led a delegation of KAL 007 victims' families to Moscow, where then President of Russia Boris Yeltsin provided them with KAL 007’s transcripts. The transcript revealed that KAL 007 remained airborne for several minutes after being struck by two Soviet air-to-air missiles before crashing into the sea. This information informed subsequent legal actions by clarifying the sequence of events. In 1997, Ephraimson-Abt's family was awarded US$2.1 million in a U.S. District Court case in Uniondale, New York, against Korean Air Lines. Ephraimson-Abt stated that the financial settlement, while substantial, could not address the Korean Air Lines's failure to recover victims' remains or provide timely information to families.

== Personal life ==
Ephraimson-Abt married Christine Anger in the 1950s, and the couple had three children: two daughters and one son, including Alice. The couple divorced in early 1970s. Following his divorce, he raised his children as a single father. He died of heart failure on 18 October 2013, in Short Hills, New Jersey, at age 91.

Following his death, then chairwoman of the NTSB Deborah Hersman noted that Ephraimson-Abt advocated for those who lacked a voice in aviation accidents, unaware of their need for one, and transformed his personal loss into efforts to ensure families of the victims of aviation accidents were treated with dignity and respect.

== Awards and honors ==
- Officer of the Order of Merit of the Federal Republic of Germany (2012)
