= TWA Flight 800 (film) =

2013 documentary television film

TWA Flight 800 is a 2013 documentary television film about the 1996 crash of TWA Flight 800 and related conspiracy theories. The film explores conspiracy theories that a missile strike had actually downed TWA Flight 800, contrary to the National Transportation Safety Board (NTSB) conclusion that a short circuit caused the 1996 fuel tank explosion. The film was written and directed by Kristina Borjesson, and co-produced by Tom Stalcup, who also served as the narrator. The film runs 90 minutes and first aired on Epix on July 17, 2013.

Stephen Pope of Flying, despite finding Stalcup's reasoning flimsy and strongly disagreeing with the conclusion, expressed his belief that the film was made in good faith and not with cynical motives.

== Background ==
Stalcup, the head of the Flight 800 Independent Researchers Organization, began his advocacy in 1997. He is a physicist.

== Contents ==
The film states that the plane was destroyed by three proximity fuse missiles, but does not state which party did it. According to the film, the primary radar data was the key piece of evidence related to the theory. The film also stated that shootdown sequence video made by the Central Intelligence Agency (CIA) was not accurate and that the Federal Bureau of Investigation (FBI) hid or tampered with the remains from the crash. It includes testimonies of people who saw the crash who stated that a missile shootdown occurred; Pope characterized these as taking up a larger amount of the film. Greg Evans of Bloomberg Businessweek stated that "The film offers no dissenting interpretation of his facts, or even outside acknowledgement that his facts are facts. Nor does the documentary attempt to explain how a cover-up that would require hundreds of participants could remain secret for 17 years."

Its interviewees include one person each from the NTSB, Trans World Airlines (TWA), and the Air Line Pilots Association, International (ALPA): Hank Hughes, Bob Young, and James Speer. The end of the film has a list of people who declined to be interviewed, including former President of the United States Bill Clinton and FBI and NTSB employees; Neil Genzlinger of The New York Times stated that this list was "lengthy".

== Reception ==
Pope argued that the film should have spent more time on the radar data theory rather than focusing on the witnesses. He expressed his view that the film's conclusions were flawed and that the official NTSB report described what happened to the flight.

Genzlinger stated that the documentary had a "serious and somber" tone instead of a "crackpot conspiracy theory" tone, but that the large number of people who chose not to be interviewed "leaves it one-sided".

Verne Gay of Newsday stated that the film fails to explain how information that was suppressed would have remained unleaked, citing the Edward Snowden affair, and that the film does not explain what would have happened to the remnants of any missiles. He added that "At the very least, this film indisputably establishes that pain and doubt—often lashed together—are deeply human traits."

Boston University journal, Bostonia, notes that the filmmakers pointedly stopped short of theorizing from where the missile(s) came. The article states, "Borjesson says she and Stalcup included only information they could document and verify."

Alex Davies of Business Insider stated that the film did not show adequate support for its claims.

Greg Evans gave the film one star.

== See also ==
- TWA Flight 800 conspiracy theories
