= Greater Israel =

Zionist ideologically irredentist term

Greater Israel (Hebrew: ארץ ישראל השלמה, romanized: Eretz Yisrael HaShlema) is an expression with several different biblical and political meanings over time. It is often used, in an irredentist fashion, to refer to the historic or desired borders of the State of Israel.

Territorial claims of Israeli nationalist or Zionist movements have varied, depending on the time period and different groups of proponents such as Labor Zionist, Revisionist Zionist, or Religious Zionist groups. There are two different primary uses of the term Greater Israel – one referring more narrowly to the area internationally recognized as part of the State of Israel along with the Golan Heights, West Bank, and Gaza Strip; and a second definition referring to the much larger region stretching from the river Nile to the Euphrates.

== History ==
=== Early Zionism ===
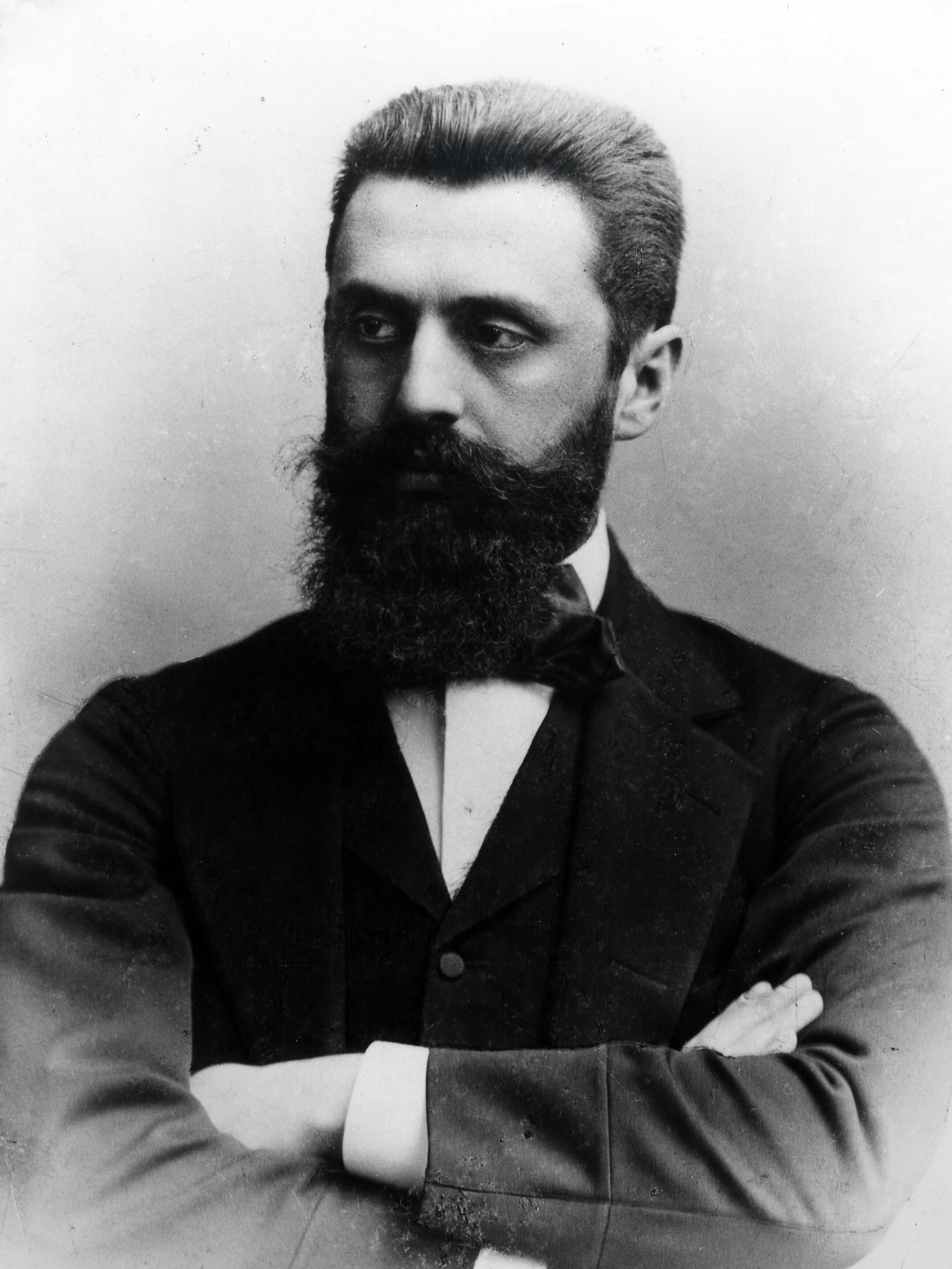
Zionist leader Theodor Herzl c.1898

Theodor Herzl, one of the founders of Zionism, was influenced by the Tanakh in his thinking on the borders for a Jewish State in Palestine. In the words of professor of history H.S. Haddad: "Herzl's idea of the geographical extent of the Jewish state was derived from the biblical romance of the Davidic Kingdom."

William Hechler, an English Christian Zionist, also influenced Herzl's thinking on the matter, (Note: Haddad 1974: "It was a Christian Zionist, a fundamentalist minister, Rev. Hechler, Chaplain to the British Embassy in Vienna, who gave Herzl the biblical definitions of the boundaries of the prospective state.") and Herzl recorded in his diary that:

In the compartment he unfolded his maps of Palestine and instructed me for hours on end. The northern frontier ought to be the mountains facing Cappadocia; the southern, the Suez Canal. The slogan to be circulated: "The Palestine of David and Solomon!"

=== The Land of Israel in Jewish history and religion ===
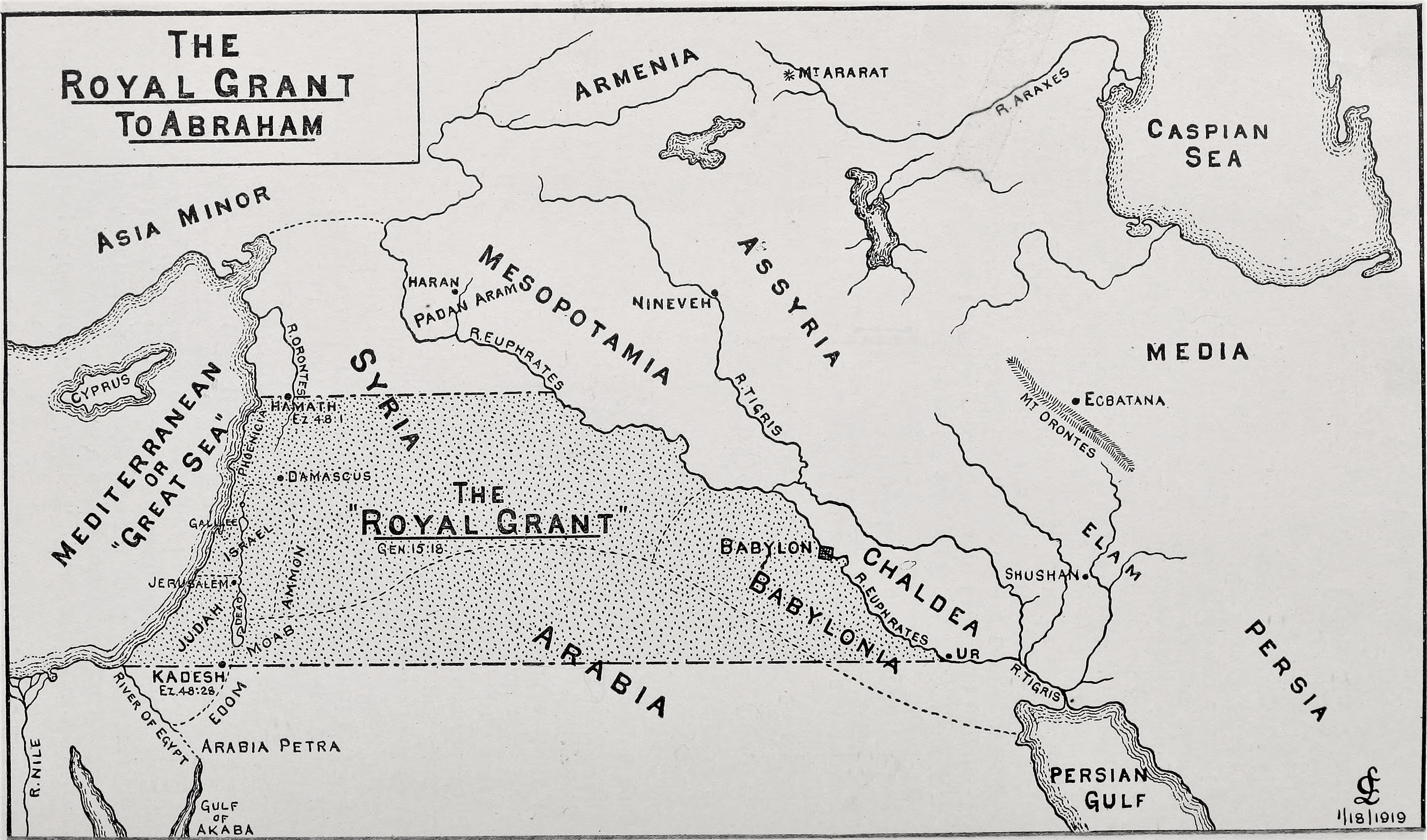
An approximation of the "Royal Grant" to Abraham consisting of all the land east of the Brook of Egypt and west of the Euphrates, north of Kadesh and south of Hamath, from a 1919 book by Clarence Larkin.

The Land of Israel (Hebrew: אֶרֶץ יִשְׂרָאֵל, Modern: ʾEreṣ Yīsraʾel, Tiberian: ʾEreṣ Yīsrāʾēl) is the traditional Jewish name for an area of the Southern Levant. Related biblical, religious and historical English terms include the Land of Canaan, the Promised Land, the Holy Land, and Palestine. The definitions of the limits of this territory vary between passages in the Hebrew Bible, with specific mentions in Genesis 15, Exodus 23, Numbers 34 and Ezekiel 47. Nine times elsewhere in the Bible, the settled land is referred as "from Dan to Beersheba", and three times it is referred as "from the entrance of Hamath unto the brook of Egypt" (1 Kings 8:65, 1 Chronicles 13:5 and 2 Chronicles 7:8).

The Bible contains three geographical definitions of the Land of Israel:

1. The first definition (Genesis 15:18–21) seems to define the land that was given to all of the children of Abram (Abraham), including Ishmael, Zimran, Jokshan, Midian, etc. It describes a large territory, "from the brook of Egypt to the Euphrates".
2. A narrower definition (Numbers 34:1–15 and Ezekiel 47:13–20) refers to the land west of the Jordan River (Canaan proper) divided among the tribes. In Ezekiel 47:18, the Jordan River itself is explicitly defined as the eastern boundary, separating Gilead on the east from "the land of Israel" on the west.
3. A wider definition (Deuteronomy 11:24, Deuteronomy 1:7) indicating the territory that will be given to the children of Israel slowly throughout the years, as explained in Exodus 23:29 and Deuteronomy 7:22).

These biblical limits for the land differ from the borders of established historical Israelite and later Jewish kingdoms, including the United Kingdom of Israel, the two kingdoms of Israel (Samaria) and Judah, the Hasmonean Kingdom, and the Herodian kingdom. At their heights, these realms ruled lands with similar but not identical boundaries.

Judaism defines the land as where Jewish religious law prevailed and excludes territory where it was not applied. It holds that the area is a God-given inheritance of the Jewish people based on the Torah, particularly the books of Genesis, Exodus, Numbers and Deuteronomy, as well as Joshua and the later Prophets. According to the Book of Genesis, the land was first promised by God to Abram's descendants; the text is explicit that this is a covenant between God and Abram for his descendants. Abram's name was later changed to Abraham, with the promise refined to pass through his son Isaac and to the Israelites, descendants of Jacob, Abraham's grandson.

==== Kingdom of Israel ====
- The Kingdom of Israel (united monarchy) (1047–931 BCE), was the kingdom established by the Israelites and uniting them under a single king.
- The Kingdom of Israel (northern kingdom) (930–c.720 BCE), was the kingdom of northern Israel after the breakup of the united monarchy of the Kingdom of Israel.
- The Kingdom of Judah (930–587 BCE), was the southern Jewish kingdom after the breakup of the united monarchy of the Kingdom of Israel.

==== Second Temple period ====
The Return to Zion (Hebrew: שִׁיבָת צִיּוֹן or שבי ציון, Shivat Tzion or Shavei Tzion, lit. 'Zion returnees') is an event recorded in Ezra–Nehemiah of the Hebrew Bible, in which the Jews of the Kingdom of Judah—subjugated by the Neo-Babylonian Empire—were freed from the Babylonian captivity following the Persian conquest of Babylon. In 539 BCE, the Persian king Cyrus the Great issued the Edict of Cyrus allowing the Jews to return to Jerusalem and the Land of Judah, which was made into a self-governing Jewish province known as Yehud under the new Persian Achaemenid Empire.

The Second Temple period or post-exilic period in Jewish history denotes the approximately 600 years (516 BCE–70 CE) during which the Second Temple stood in the city of Jerusalem. It began with the return to Zion and subsequent reconstruction of the Temple in Jerusalem, and ended with the First Jewish–Roman War and the Roman siege of Jerusalem.

=== Palestine under British rule 1917–1948 ===
==== Balfour Declaration ====
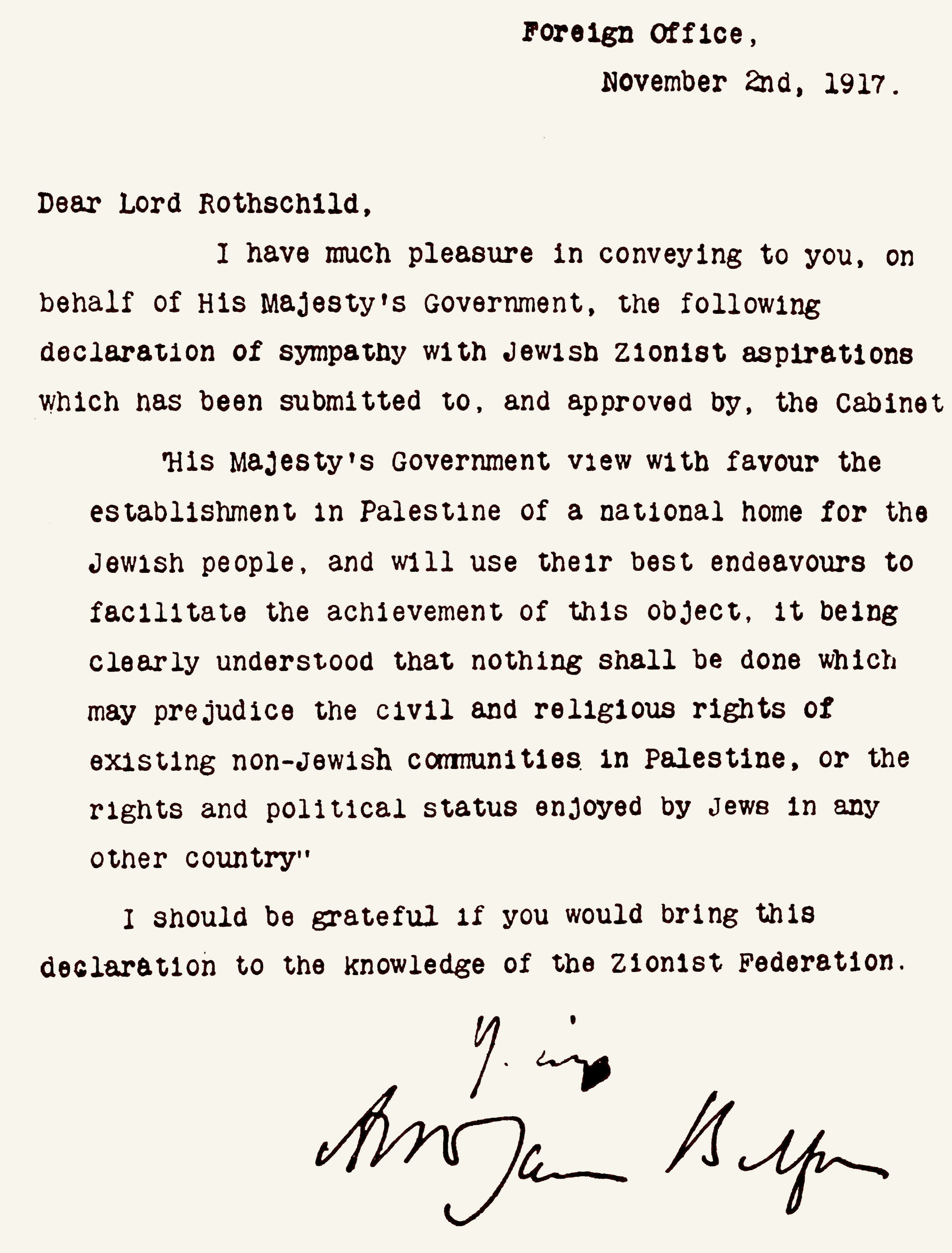
The 1917 Balfour Declaration

The Balfour Declaration was a public statement issued by the British Government in 1917 during the First World War announcing that it "viewed with favour" the establishment of a "national home for the Jewish people" in Palestine, then an Ottoman region with a small minority Jewish population. The declaration was contained in a letter dated 2 November 1917 from the United Kingdom's Foreign Secretary Arthur Balfour to Lord Rothschild, a leader of the British Jewish community, for transmission to the Zionist Federation of Great Britain and Ireland. The text of the declaration was published in the press on 9 November 1917.

On the military front in Palestine, the Sinai and Palestine campaign was part of the Middle Eastern theatre of World War I, taking place between January 1915 and October 1918. It brought Palestine under British control that ended with the Armistice of Mudros in 1918, leading to the cession of Ottoman Syria that included most of western Palestine.

==== During the British Mandate for Palestine ====
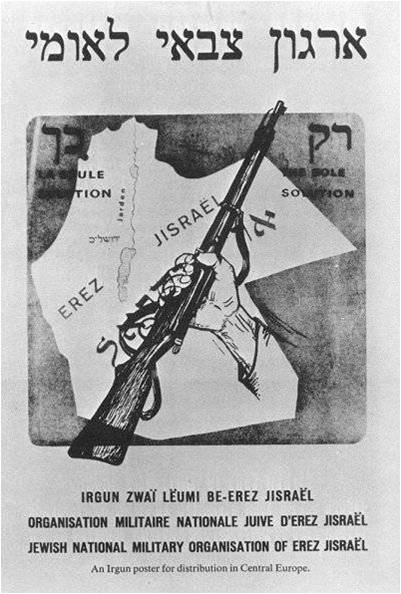
An Irgun poster from 1931 showing a map labelled "Land of Israel" covering the borders of both Mandatory Palestine and the Emirate of Transjordan, which the Irgun claimed in their entirety for a future Jewish state.

Early Revisionist Zionist groups such as Betar and Irgun Zvai-Leumi regarded the territory of the Mandate for Palestine, including Transjordan, as Greater Israel.

In 1928 Zionist leader Menachem Ussishkin gave a speech in Jerusalem demanding "a Jewish state without compromises and without concessions, from Dan to Be'er-sheva, from the great sea to the desert, including Transjordan."

In 1937, the Peel Commission recommended partition of Mandatory Palestine. In a letter to his son later that year, David Ben-Gurion stated that partition would be acceptable but as a first step. Ben-Gurion wrote that

This is because this increase in possession is of consequence not only in itself, but because through it we increase our strength, and every increase in strength helps in the possession of the land as a whole. The establishment of a state, even if only on a portion of the land, is the maximal reinforcement of our strength at the present time and a powerful boost to our historical endeavors to liberate the entire country.

The same sentiment was recorded by Ben-Gurion on other occasions, such as at a meeting of the Jewish Agency executive in June 1938, as well as by Chaim Weizmann. Ben Gurion said:

We shall smash these frontiers which are being forced upon us, and not necessarily by war. I believe an agreement between us and the Arab State could be reached in a not too distant future."

Of the Peel Commission's partition plan Zionist leader Chaim Weizmann stated "I know that God promised Palestine to the children of Israel, but I do not know what boundaries He set. I believe they were wider than the ones now proposed and may have included Transjordan."

=== During early period of the State of Israel ===
Joel Greenberg writing in The New York Times notes: "At Israel's founding in 1948, the Labor Zionist leadership, which went on to govern Israel in its first three decades of independence, accepted a pragmatic partition of what had been British Palestine into independent Jewish and Arab states. The opposition Revisionist Zionists, who evolved into today's Likud party, sought Eretz Yisrael Ha-Shlema—Greater Israel, or literally, the Whole Land of Israel (shalem, meaning complete)." The capture of the West Bank and Gaza Strip from Jordan and Egypt during the Six-Day War in 1967 led to the growth of the non-parliamentary Movement for Greater Israel and the construction of Israeli settlements. The 1977 elections, which brought Likud to power also had considerable impact on acceptance and rejection of the term. Greenberg notes:

THE seed was sown in 1977, when Menachem Begin of Likud brought his party to power for the first time in a stunning election victory over Labor. A decade before, in the 1967 war, Israeli troops had in effect undone the partition accepted in 1948 by overrunning the West Bank and Gaza Strip. Ever since, Mr. Begin had preached undying loyalty to what he called Judea and Samaria (the West Bank lands) and promoted Jewish settlement there. But he did not annex the West Bank and Gaza to Israel after he took office, reflecting a recognition that absorbing the Palestinians could turn Israel into a bi-national state instead of a Jewish one.

Yitzhak Shamir was a dedicated proponent of Greater Israel and as Israeli Prime Minister gave the settler movement funding and Israeli governmental legitimisation.

It had been suggested that the blue stripes on the Israeli flag represent the Nile and Euphrates as the boundaries of Eretz Isra'el as promised to the Jews by God according to religious scripture. This claim was at a time made by Yasser Arafat, and would later be made by Iran, and Hamas. However, Danny Rubinstein points out that "Arafat ... added, in interviews that he gave in the past, that the two blue stripes on the Israeli flag represent the Nile and the Euphrates.... No Israeli, even those who demonstrate understanding for Palestinian distress, will accept the ... nonsense about the blue stripes on the flag, which was designed according to the colours of the traditional tallit (prayer shawl) ..." The 10 agorot controversy was a conspiracy theory put forth by Palestine Liberation Organization chairman Yasser Arafat at a specially convened session of the UN Security Council in Geneva on 25 May 1990. At the session, Arafat claimed that the obverse design of an Israeli ten agorot coin contained a map of Greater Israel.

=== Movement for Greater Israel and Gush Emunim ===
The Movement for Greater Israel (Hebrew: התנועה למען ארץ ישראל השלמה, HaTenu'a Lema'an Eretz Yisrael HaSheleima), also known as the Land of Israel Movement, was a political organisation in Israel during the 1960s and 1970s which subscribed to an ideology of Greater Israel. The organization was formed in July 1967, a month after Israel captured the Gaza Strip, the Sinai Peninsula, the West Bank, and the Golan Heights in the Six-Day War. It called on the Israeli government to keep the captured areas and to settle them with Jewish populations. Despite the decrease in support of a Jewish homeland stretching from "the River of Egypt to ... the River Euphrates" among the Religious Zionists, Gush Emunim persisted in that belief in the 1970s and 1980s.

== 21st century ambitions ==
Example map of Greater Israel with borders according to the Old Testament

Today the term "Greater Israel" can refer to Israeli control over a number of different territories:

- the State of Palestine (West Bank and Gaza Strip); together with the State of Israel form the combined territory of the former Mandatory Palestine
- Trans-Jordan (modern-day Jordan)
- area between the Nile and the Euphrates, which includes parts of modern day Egypt, Lebanon, Syria, Iraq, and parts of Saudi Arabia.

Some Israelis still interpret "Greater Israel" to include the Golan Heights and Sinai Peninsula, or even as a promise of dominion over the entire area from the river Nile (in modern Egypt) to the Euphrates River (which flows through today's Turkey, Syria, and Iraq).

In the present day, the Hardal section of the Religious Zionist movement has brought back claims of a Jewish homeland extending from "the River of Egypt to ... the River Euphrates". According to history professor Yoav Di-Capua, one of the beliefs of the Hardal movement is "the obligation to retrieve the biblical land of Israel in its entirety as a pre-requisite for collective redemption which heralds the arrival of the Messiah".

=== Palestine ===
In the 2000s, the annexation of the West Bank and Gaza Strip was part of the platform of the mainstream Israeli Likud party, and of some other, often more extreme Israeli political parties. On September 14, 2008, Israeli Prime Minister Ehud Olmert, formerly of Likud, remarked that "Greater Israel is over. There is no such thing. Anyone who talks that way is deluding themselves", making this statement just two days before privately reaching out to the Palestinian president with a comprehensive plan that ultimately never was implemented.

In 2017, Israel's right-wing president Reuven Rivlin backed annexation of the West Bank with full rights for the Palestinians. Meir Kahane, an ultra-nationalist Knesset member, who founded the American Jewish Defense League and the banned Israeli Kach party, worked towards Greater Israel and other Religious Zionist goals. Kach, Tehiya, and the National Religious Party are parties which supported the idea of a Greater Israel.

Francesca Albanese and Amos Goldberg have said that an aim towards a Greater Israel is a factor during the Gaza genocide.

=== In academia ===
Hillel Weiss, a professor at Bar-Ilan University, has promoted the "necessity" of rebuilding the Temple and of Jewish rule over Greater Israel.

=== Jordan ===
In March 2023, the Israeli Finance Minister Bezalel Smotrich, leader of the far-right Religious Zionist Party, spoke at a Paris memorial behind a podium featuring a 'Greater Israel' map including Trans-Jordan. This speech has led to tensions with Jordan, while his spokesperson attributed the symbol's presence to the organizers of the event, which was dedicated to a man connected to the Irgun (see above for Irgun emblem). In response to the diplomatic controversy, Israel's Foreign Ministry stated that Israel adheres to the 1994 peace treaty and respects Jordan's sovereignty.

=== Egypt, Syria and Lebanon ===
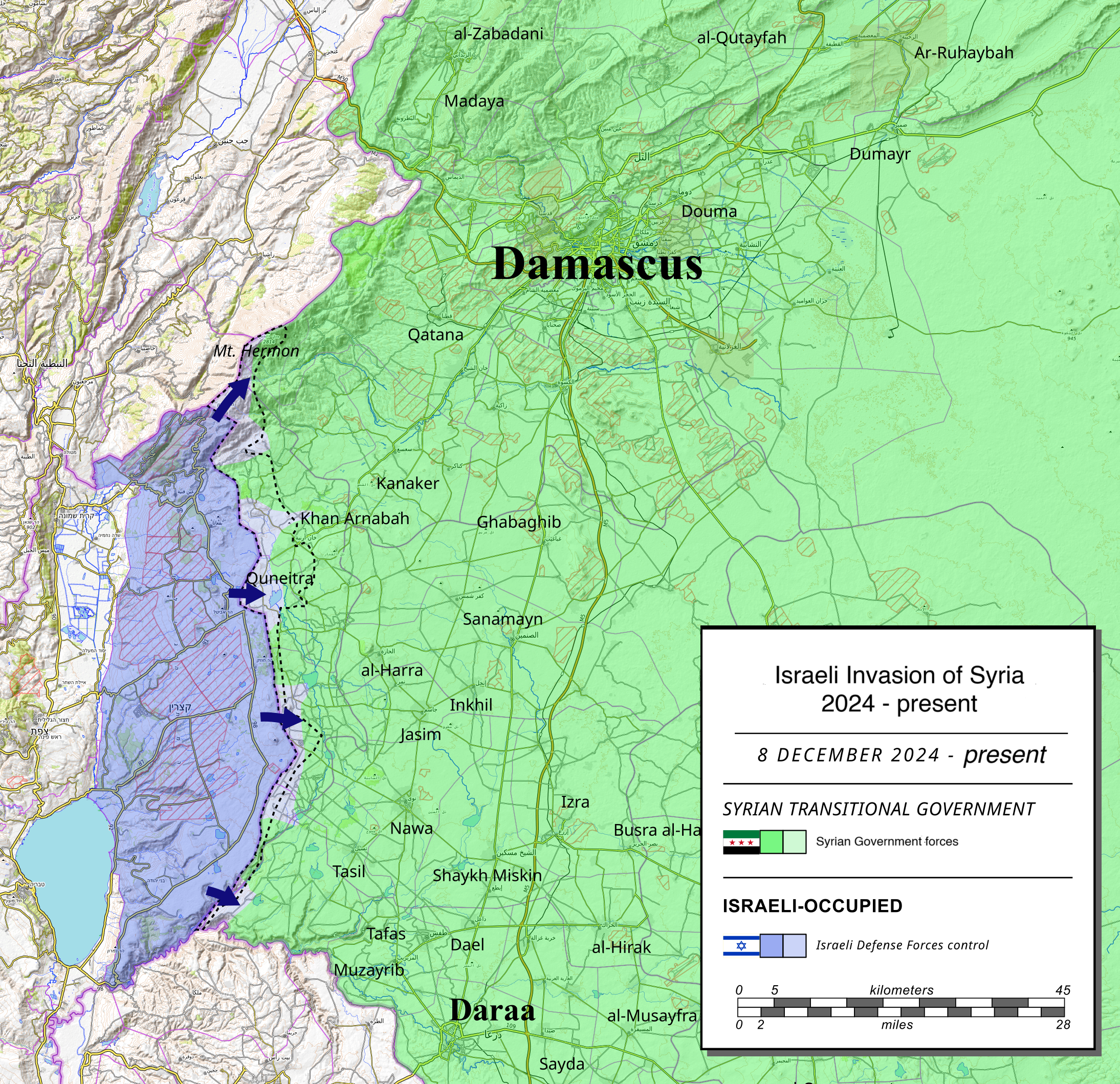
Israeli-occupied Golan Heights and Israeli invasion of Syria

Map of the 2026 Lebanon war Israel Israeli occupied Golan Heights Attested Hezbollah presence in Lebanon Lebanese territory under Israeli control Syria Litani River (For an up-to-date, interactive, detailed map of the current military situation, see here.)

The most expansionist claim for a Greater Israel comes from a biblical verse (Genesis 15:18-21), which implies that the land between the Nile and the Euphrates is Promised Land.

According to Nadav Shelef, a minority of Religious Zionist groups supported a Jewish homeland extending from "the River of Egypt to ... the River Euphrates" in 1925, whereas modern-day such groups changed the claims to present-day Israel, the Golan Heights, Gaza Strip, and West Bank by 2005. However, the Hardal section of the Religious Zionist groups still supports "the River of Egypt to ... the River Euphrates" claims.

In August 2025, Israeli prime minister Benjamin Netanyahu said in an interview with i24NEWS that he was on a "historic and spiritual mission" and that he is "very" attached to the vision of Greater Israel, which includes Palestinian areas and possibly also places that are part of Jordan, Egypt, Syria, and Lebanon. He stated that the generation of his parents was responsible for establishing the state, and it is now his duty, as well as that of his generation, to guarantee the survival of this state (Greater Israel). In response to Netanyahu's statements, the foreign ministers from Arab and Muslim nations denounced his assertion regarding "Greater Israel" as a blatant infringement of international law. The nations that expressed this condemnation included Saudi Arabia, Algeria, Bahrain, Bangladesh, Chad, Comoros, Djibouti, Egypt, Gambia, Indonesia, Iraq, Jordan, Kuwait, Lebanon, Libya, Maldives, Mauritania, Morocco, Nigeria, Oman, Pakistan, Palestine, Qatar, Senegal, Sierra Leone, Somalia, Sudan, Syria, Turkey, the United Arab Emirates, and Yemen.

After the start of the 2026 Iran War and the 2026 Lebanon War, Daniel Levy has interpreted that "Greater Israel" for Netanyahu is not only a project of territorial expansion but also of regional dominion. Israel would have to outbalance Iran and weaken the Gulf Cooperation Council countries. If the Strait of Hormuz and Bab el-Mandeb are closed by the Irani answer to the war, fossil fuel exports from the Gulf would have to be routed to Israeli ports. Israel would be the key of an "hexagon of alliances" with India and other Arab, African, Mediterranean and Asian states. Israeli strategists plan further regional control without holding territory.

Israeli Finance Minister Bezalel Smotrich has suggested that Israel is destined to expand to include Jordan, and even beyond, to parts of Syria, Lebanon, Jordan, Egypt and even Iraq. In a documentary film by Arte in 2024, Smotrich said “it is written that the future of Jerusalem is to expand to Damascus.”

Israel's invasion of Syria has raised concerns that Israel is pursuing expansion into other countries.

In 2024, Israeli far-right politician and pro-Outpost activist Daniella Weiss said: "We know from the Bible that the real borders of Greater Israel are the Euphrates and the Nile".

In February 2026, Mike Huckabee, the United States Ambassador to Israel, told conservative talk-show host Tucker Carlson in an interview that it would be "fine" if Israel took over the entire Middle East.

In June 2026, Rabbi Eliyahu Zini, the uncle of Shin Bet Chief David Zini, criticized a ceasefire agreement with the Lebanese government, asserting, "all of Lebanon belongs to us." He questioned Israeli ministers, asking, "Are you normal? You are giving up the inheritance of our ancestors on what basis?"

== See also ==
- Christian Zionism
- A Clean Break: A New Strategy for Securing the Realm
- "The East Bank of the Jordan"
- "From the river to the sea"
- Muslim Zionism
- Proposed Israeli annexation of the West Bank
- Revisionist Maximalism
- State of Judea – Proposed Jewish state in the Palestinian West Bank
- Yinon Plan
