= Hillel Weiss =

Israeli academic (born 1945)

Hillel Weiss (Hebrew: הלל ויס; born 1945) is a professor emeritus of literature at Bar Ilan University in Israel.

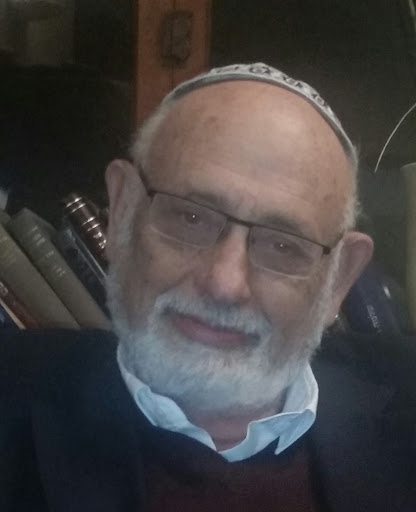
Hillel Weiss, 2016

== Academic career ==
Hillel Weiss is a tenured professor at the Joseph & Norman Berman Department of Literature of the Jewish People, Faculty of Jewish Studies, Bar-llan University, Ramat-Gan, Israel. As head of the Department of Hebrew Literature, he changed its name to the Department of Literature of the Jewish People. He is the editor of “Bikoret U’parshanut,” a journal of literary criticism.

As a literary researcher, he specializes in the work of Shmuel Yosef Agnon, about whom he has published five books. He developed a computerized database for the author's complete works, with 2,500,000 words that can be accessed online through a retrieval system. The access is through three main frames:

- Frame A: Poetics. General typology, genres; motifs sources, poetic functions.

- Frame B: index of subjects, philosophy, history; society; psychology.

- Frame C: indices of individual works according to A and B, index of place and names, index of synopses; abstracts of criticism; bibliography.

== Views and opinions ==
Hillel Weiss is a prominent figure of the Neo-Zionist movement. He was one of the founders of the Religious Zionist movement in the early 1970s. He believes in the necessity of rebuilding the Temple and instating Jewish rule over Greater Israel. Weiss believes that secular Jews are betraying their cultural heritage if they deny the mythical aspect of the Masada narrative. In the chapter "The Messianic Theme in the Works of A.B. Yehoshua and Amos Oz" in the anthology Israel and the Post-Zionists: A Nation at Risk, Weiss invokes the Holocaust as a cognitive filter to describe the actions of the right wing Israeli government and portrays post-Zionism as a negation of a Jewish State, anti-Zionist and anti-Israel. Weiss views the Jewish experience as an "ongoing Shoah".

He has also opposed a visit by Pope Benedict XVI to Israel because of previously expressed views by the Holy See that Jerusalem should become an international city.

In October 2014, Hillel Weiss was accused by several Israeli media outlets, including Haaretz, of advocating "the annihilation of Palestinians". The accusation referenced a Facebook comment made by Weiss towards Palestinian Authority president Mahmoud Abbas, in which he that stated that there is no genocide against the Palestinian people, as Palestinian Arabs have never constituted "a people". The statement was condemned by Bar Ilan University as ‘contemptible’ and ‘immoral’. Weiss himself has refuted these accusations, including the accusation that he called the elimination of Palestinians, enumerating specific ways by which Haaretz grossly misrepresented the content of his Facebook post.

== Controversy ==
Weiss was the cause of a controversy during the 2005 Gay Pride Parade in Jerusalem when he said, "This abomination should be expelled from the Holy City by any means necessary." Weiss became the subject of another controversy due to comments he made in August 2007, during the eviction of his daughter, Tehila Yahalom, from the Hebron wholesale market. Moshe Kaveh, president of Bar-Ilan University, denounced his remarks. The Council for Peace and security also criticized him. In August 2008, he was indicted for incitement to violence after he publicly cursed the IDF Hebron Brigade commander, wishing him death and his family bereavement.

== Published works ==
- Defamation: Israeli Literature of Elimination, Beit El, 1992.
- Agnon and Germany: The Presence of the German World in the Writings of S.Y. Agnon., editor, along with Hans Juergen-Becker, Bar-Ilan Press, 2010.
