= Eliyahu Zini =

Rabbi and educator

Rabbi Eliyahu Rahamim Zini
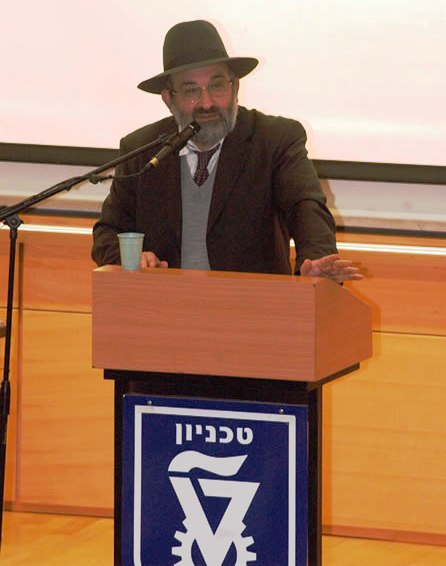
- Eliyahu Zini in 2008.

Personal life
- Born: 11 August 1946 (age 80) Mécheria, French Algeria

Religious life
- Religion: Judaism

Jewish leader
- Yeshiva: Yeshivat Or Vishua
- Residence: Israel

Eliyahu Rahamim Zini (born 11 August 1946) is the rosh yeshiva of Yeshivat Or Vishua, which he founded in Haifa in 2001. In the past, he has served as the rabbi of the Technion, as a lecturer in its Faculty of Mathematics, and in the Department of Humanities and Arts. He is also the uncle of current head of the Shin Bet David Zini.

== Biography ==
Eliyahu Zini was born on 11 August 1946 to a family of Torah scholars, the eldest of Rachel and Rabbi Meir Zini, the rabbi of Taharat, Algeria. It is claimed that the origins of the Zini family are traced back to Rabbi Joseph Yoshto, a student of Isaac Alfasi from Jaén, Spain in northeastern Andalusia. His mother Rachel, a survivor of the Auschwitz death camp, met his father while he was an officer in the Free French Forces when the camp was liberated.

With the end of French sovereignty in Algeria in 1962, Eliyahu Zini moved with his family to Paris, where he finished his secondary school studies and began studying mathematics in the University of Paris. He began rabbinical studies under Rabbi Shlomo Dahan. He also studied karate and earned his second-degree black belt.

In 1970 he made aliyah to the land of Israel, living first in Bnei Brak and then moving to Haifa. There he became close with Rabbi Professor Benjamin Ze'ev Benedict, rabbi of the Ahuza neighborhood, from whom he would later receive semikhah. At the Technion, he completed his doctorate in mathematics which he had begun in Paris, and he did his post-doctorate at the Weizmann Institute of Science. Afterward, he returned to the Technion as a senior associate lecturer in the Faculty of Mathematics and as a senior associate lecturer of Talmud and Jewish philosophy in the Department of Humanities and Arts.

He served in Israel's Medical Corps and fought in the 1982 Lebanon War.

When the previous rabbi of the Technion decided leave his position, he advised the senate of the Technion to appoint Zini in his place. In 1980, Zini began serving as the rabbi of the Technion in addition to his position as a lecturer.

In 2001, he founded Yeshivat Or Vishua, a hesder yeshiva located near the Technion.

Zini currently lives with his wife and eight children in the Neve Sha'anan neighborhood of Haifa.

== Public activities ==
=== Education and research in Jewish disciplines ===
Rabbi Zini dedicates his time to disseminating Torah to the public. He began a program at the Technion which enabled students to add Torah study to their science and engineering studies.

Zini's research in Torah-related fields focuses on books of the Geonim. Some of his research has been published in books, pamphlets, and articles. He has published series of books in Hebrew such as "Olamot BeIhudam" ("Worlds in their Unity"), "Erets Hemdatenu" ("Land of Our Desires"). He has published chidushim (original Torah thoughts) of Rashbatz on tractates Rosh Hashanah and Kinnim of the Babylonian Talmud, as well as "Magen Avot," Rashbatz' commentary on Pirkei Avot. Similarly, he has published research on the history of halakha and the editing of the Talmud, such as "Rabanan Savora'ei ve-Klalei ha-Halakha" ("The Savoraim and the Rules of Halakha"). He has also published letters of Elijah Benamozegh, Hebrew translations of Professor Emmanuel Levinas, Hebrew translations of Rabbi Léon Ashkenazi (with whom he was particularly close), and others. He also printed new Land of Israel editions of the "Tefilat ha-Hodesh" siddur and "Mo'adei Hashem" mahzor for the Shalosh Regalim (the Three Pilgrimage Festivals).

Zini advocates for the joining of Torah study and science, claiming that it is fundamentally impossible for them to be contradictory. He opposes the methodology employed by Professor Nathan Aviezer in Aviezer's book "Bereishit Bara." The book uses scientific fact to prove the accuracy of the Torah, while Zini does not believe that such explanations are necessary.

Zini's method of Torah study is based on a broad knowledge of the literature of the Tanaim and Amoraim, a deeper study of the earlier sources in Midrash halakha, and only then a discussion of the words of the Talmud and Rishonim. In Talmud study, Zini uses the writings of the Geonim.

Zini is also involved in philosophy. He met Professor Emmanuel Levinas in France and translated some of his essays. He published four of Levinas' articles in a pamphlet entitled "Divrei Emmanuel" ("The Words of Emmanuel") and cites him in his lectures.

=== Encouragement of Aliyah and absorption into Israel ===
Rabbi Zini immigrated to Israel in 1970. He moved to Bnei Brak and began finishing his doctoral studies at the Technion. On his return to the Technion as an associate senior lecturer, Zini began activities to draw in the new immigrants from amongst the student body. A group of French immigrants formed the original basis of the minyan at the Technion synagogue.

=== Rabbi of the Technion ===
At the start of his operations at the Technion, Rabbi Zini acted privately, delivering lectures and organizing events for students. In 1980, the previous rabbi of the Technion, Rabbi Aharon She'ar-Yashuv, left the institution, recommending that Zini take his place.

As rabbi of the Technion, Zini headed the organization of religious students there, called Ahvat Aharon. He opposed the plan to grant homosexual couples dorms reserved for married students. Once this plan was put into action, Zini ruled that the mezuzot must be removed from any of those dorms that were given to homosexual couples, though the institution did not comply.

In 2013, on reaching retirement age, he left his position.

=== Political stance ===
Rabbi Zini is well known within the world view that sees the land of Israel as one of the foundations of Judaism, and it is within this world view that his political stance manifests itself. In November 1994, during the harsh debates within Israeli society over the Oslo Accords, he said in his weekly broadcast on Israeli news station Arutz Sheva: "Apparently God knows why the ways of the evildoers who currently run our country have succeeded, for apparently we and you did not do what He expected of us...Meanwhile, of the one primarily responsible for the deterioration of the situation, Mr. Rabin, it is said disgrace on your holiday tomorrow and those who celebrate with you, and may it be God's will to save us quickly from you and then there will be much peace for those who love His name and Torah."

In the libel suit which Zini brought against the local newspaper "Kolbo," the judge ruled that the paper was guilty of libel against Zini, but only awarded him 1,000 NIS compensation, explaining: "From the material that is presented, the image arises of a man with extreme opinions, who is not averse to [making] statements bordering on incitement, using language that approaches—if not reaches—verbal abuse," and adding: "And this is not a case of an innocent man upon whom guilt of incitement was cast. His opinions and style arouse hatred and separatism while causing difficult injuries to large parts of the population that do not share his world view, and the creation of polarization within society as directly connected to the advertisement under discussion should be taken into account when awarding the compensation." Zini's appeal on the amount of compensation was rejected by the district court.

One of Zini's essays appears in "Baruch ha-Gever" (a book written in memory of Baruch Goldstein) granting legitimacy to Rabbi Ido Elba's article "Beirur Halakhot Harigat Goy" ("An Inquiry into the Halakhot of Killing Gentiles"), an article which the Supreme Court of Israel deemed an inciter of racism.

In an article published on 12 August 1995 in the newspaper "Aleh," Zini wrote: "An ordinance of evacuation of civilian settlements is not only an illegal ordinance, but also an ordinance that assists the enemy... Any ordinance that assists the enemy... Any order of evacuation will be considered as carrying out the job of the enemy who desires the execution of this ordinance."

Zini opposed the statements of Rabbi Elazar Shach and the halakhic rulings of Rabbi Ovadia Yosef regarding the giving up of settlements in the West Bank and Gaza. He published a pamphlet entitled "Erets Hemdatenu" in which he argued that the sources cited by Rabbi Yosef to prove the permissibility of returning settlements in fact prove the opposite.

Following the 2006 Lebanon War, Zini wrote:

One conclusion presents itself immediately, and that is the obligation that falls upon this wonderful generation, which managed with a high hand this battle with supreme dedication the likes of which we have not seen in 2000 years, to throw in history's trash bin this government, which is entirely a collection of scraps collected by a collector of weak politicians ready to [do] anything, a tyrannical collector who crushed in his path all ethical values and all national values, all to save his skin in the justice system which—as in the statement of former commander-in-chief Bugi Yaalon—apparently does not know mercy other than with its friends and friends of friends.

Prior to the 2009 Israeli election, Zini wrote: "At least two goals must stand before our eyes in these elections: The first, support for those who defend the Torah and the Jewish identity, and the second, support for all those who defend the land of Israel and oppose with all their might a chain of terrible concessions that have already brought about enough bloodshed and enough disasters for the entire Israeli reality." He recommended voting for The Jewish Home party or the National Union and was careful to note that "these matters are not the opinion of the other institution at which I work."

In June 2026, Zini criticized a ceasefire agreement with the Lebanese government, asserting, "all of Lebanon belongs to us." He questioned Israeli ministers, asking, "Are you normal? You are giving up the inheritance of our ancestors on what basis?".

== Books ==
=== Books written ===
- Olamot be-Ihudam (Worlds in their Unity)
  - Volumes 1 – 3: On religion and science, Judaism in reality, relations between secular and religion Jews, and Judaism and Zionism
  - Volume 4: On Passover in halahkha and thought
- Rabanan Savora'ei u-Klalei ha-Halakha (The Savoraim and the Rules of Halakha) – Talmudic research, Haifa 1992. This book is part of a series of books on the subject which has not yet been published.
- Etz Erez (Cedar Tree) – series of books with halakhic and philosophical articles
  - Volume 1: Recitation of Hallel on Rosh Chodesh and Chol HaMoed of Passover, recitation of Hallel by an individual without a minyan, the prohibition of eating meat with milk, Joshua ben Perachiah
  - Volume 2: Eating the Afikoman after midnight, women leaning at the Passover Seder, one who has only a kezayit (volume of an olive) of shmurah matzah, Counting of the Omer, the Bar Kokhba revolt
  - Volume 3: The mitzvah of leaning at the Seder, the sale of chametz (leaven), Shabbat, Chanukah
  - Volume 4: Recitation of piyyutim (liturgical poems) during prayer, the tradition of Kapparot, recitation of the Avinu Malkeinu and Tzidkatecha prayers on Shabbat Rosh Chodesh, standing during the shofar blasts, the question of whether mitzvot require intention, Selichot, repentance, and mercy
  - Volume 5 (2014): the status of twilight according to Rabbeinu Tam, the time for lighting Chanukah candles, laws of Chanukah candles for one away from home, the Kaddish prayer, the formulation of the Al ha-Nisim prayer, the Binding of Isaac, the question of the Hasmoneans and its solution
- Erets Hemdatenu (Land of our Desire) – a halakhic inquiry regarding the possible prohibition of giving Jewish settlements in the land of Israel to non-Jews, Haifa 1994
- Al ha-Sho'ah (On the Holocaust), a publication of Yeshivat Or Vishua, revised Haifa 2012
- Harchivei Makom Ahaleikh, Haifa 2013
  - Part 1: On the method of Torah study
  - Part 2: On Purim
- Arazim Aleph – on Purim, Haifa 2014

=== Books translated to Hebrew or edited ===
- Chidushei ha-Rashbatz on Tractates Rosh Hashana and Kinnim, based on ancient manuscripts and first editions
- Yachin u-Vo'az, responsa of Rabbi Tzemach ben Shlomo Duran, part 1
- Magen Avot, Jerusalem 2000
- Passover Haggadah Magid Devarav le-Yaakov, commentary of Rabbi Israel Jacob Algazi, Haifa 2010
- Introduction to the Oral Torah by Elijah Benamozegh, part 1, Jerusalem 2002
- Musar Yehudi Le'umat Musar Notsri (Jewish Ethics Compared with Christian Ethics), by Elijah Benamozegh, Haifa 2007
- Divrei Emmanuel (Words of Emmanuel), four articles by Emmanuel Levinas from "Heirut Kashah" ("Difficult Freedom")
- Translations of Emmanuel Levinas, eight articles from "Heirut Kashah", online edition
- Ozar Hageonim Abodah zara, Haifa 2016
