= Nave Sha'anan, Haifa =

Neighborhood in Haifa, Israel

Coordinates: 32°47′25″N 35°0′57″E

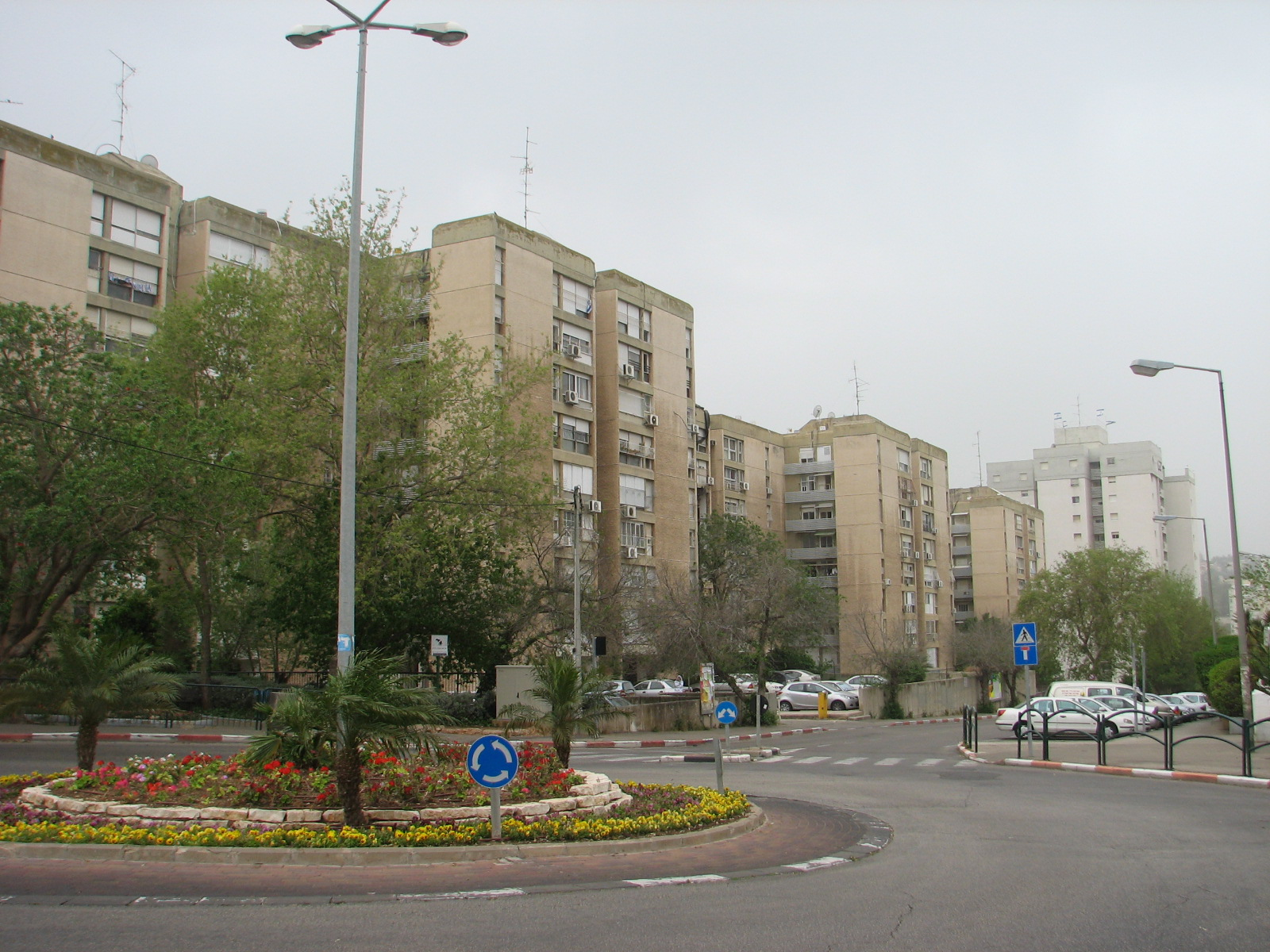
A typical North Navé Sha'anan street view, 2009

Nave Sha'anan (Hebrew: נָוֶה שַׁאֲנָן, lit. 'tranquil abode') is a large residential neighborhood in eastern Haifa, Israel that extends from the lower inclines of Mount Carmel to midway across its slopes. The main campus of the Technion university is located in the outskirts of Nave Sha'anan.

Its name is one of the many traditional "Names of Jerusalem", and is based on a verse in the Isaiah: "Look upon Zion, the city of our solemnities: thine eyes shall see Jerusalem a quiet habitation, a tabernacle that shall not be taken down".

== History ==
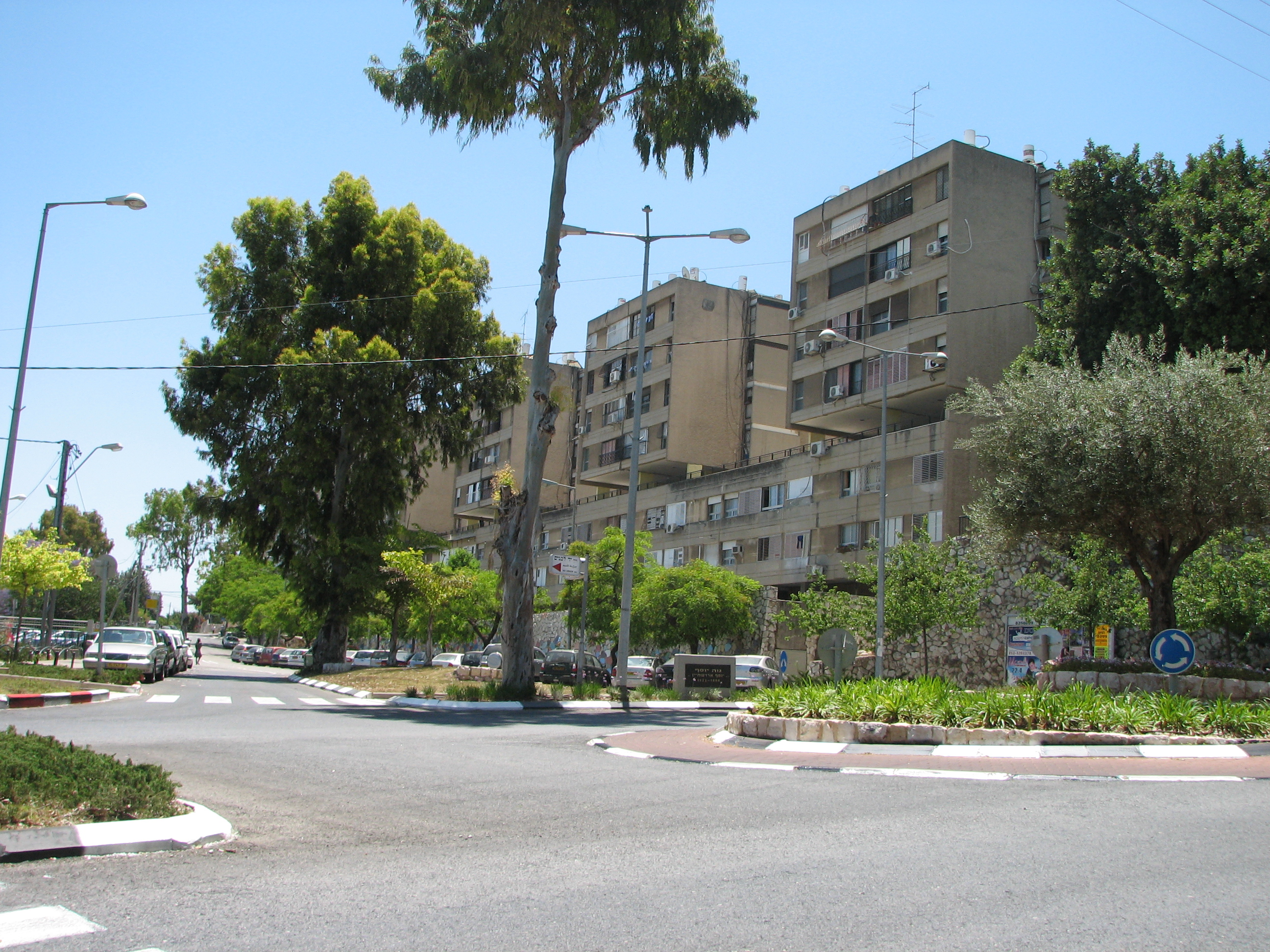
A street in the neighbourhood.

Nave Sha'anan was founded in 1922 as an isolated rural neighbourhood on the Carmel mountain with typical one storey family homes, some of which can still be glimpsed here and there. During the 60s and the 70s the neighbourhood gradually transformed into its present urban form. In recent years it is undergoing a rapid process of renovation and replacement of older homes by new high rise residential blocks.

== Demography ==
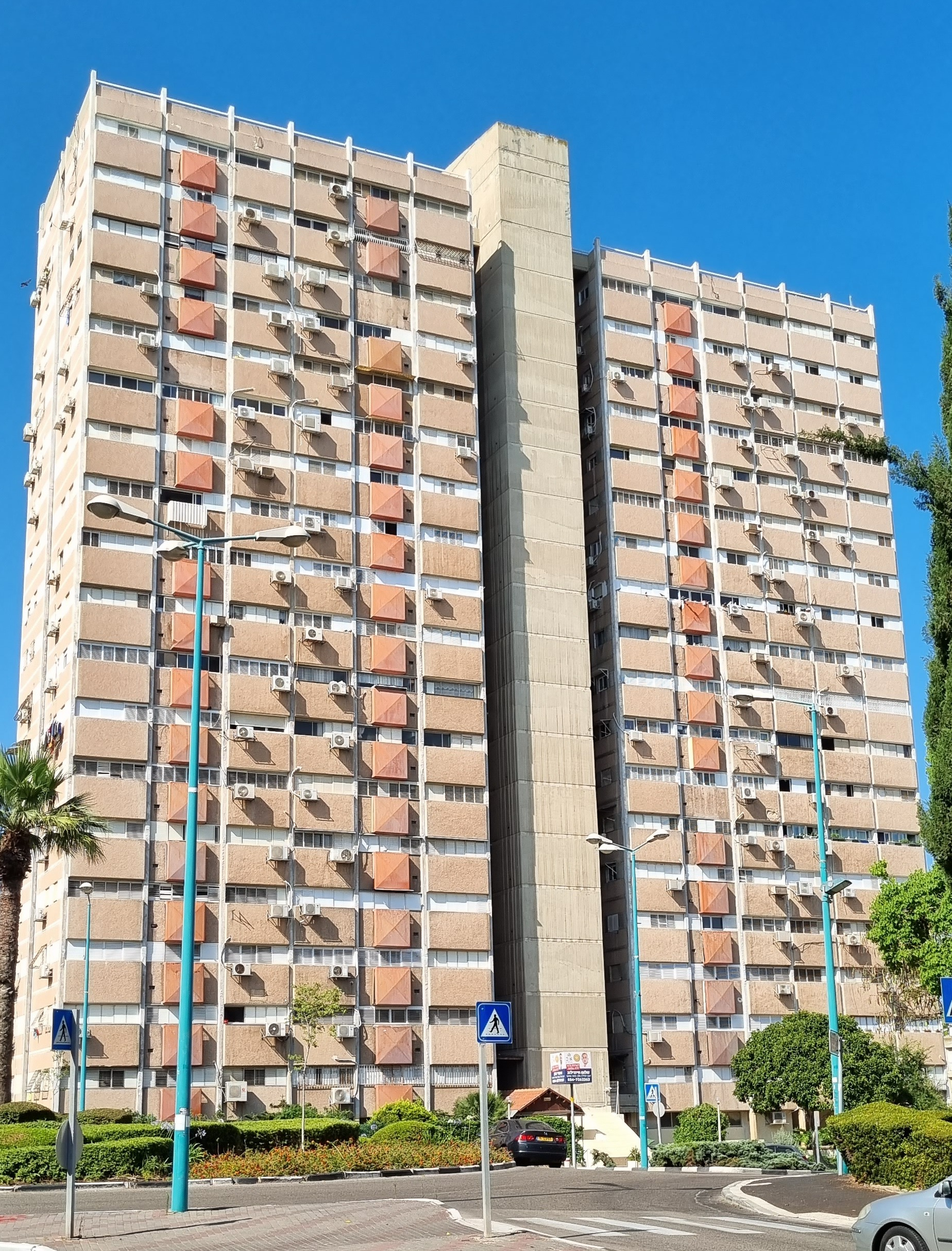
An apartment building in the neighbourhood.

In 2021, Nave Sha'anan proper had a population of 44,100, accounting for 15% of the city's total population. However, it is common to refer to the entire area surrounding Nave Sha'anan by the same name, and in that case the population is greater than 80,000, constituting the largest Israeli "single" neighbourhood.

== Economics and Transportation ==
The significant Grand Canyon shopping mall is located in Neve Sha'anan (the name is a play on words, since kanyon means "mall" in Hebrew, and the mall is located in a canyon).

In recent years Nave Sha'anan came to house a major transportation hub in the wider Haifa area. The construction of the Carmel Tunnels, with a single exit point in Haifa just below Nave Sha'anan, and the recent opening of the Giborim road, creating another route from the Carmel neighbourhoods to downtown Haifa, brought Nave Sha'anan to the forefront of the Haifa traffic network.

== Neve Sha'anan Quarters ==
Haifa Municipality divides Neve Sha'anan into two statistical quarters. Neve Sha'anan–Jezreeliya, the northern of the two quarters is 3.03 km^{2} (1.17 sq mi) in area, about 5% of the total jurisdictional area of Haifa. In 2008, the population of the district was 36,300 inhabitants, about 14% of the entire city. Ramot Neve Sha'anan, a cluster of neighborhoods south of the Neve Sha'anan–Jezreeliya, is 3.82 km^{2} (1.47 sq mi) in area, about 6% of the total urban area. In 2015, its population was 21,500 inhabitants, about 7.7% of the total city residents. Each of the two quarters is divided into sub-quarters, which are further divided into neighborhoods.

=== Neve Sha'anan district–Jezreeliya ===
The quarter is divided into 3 sub-quarters: Neve Sha'anan, Jezreeliya and Mordot Neve Sha'anan.

==== Mordot Neve Sha'anan ====
The sub-district "Mordot Neve Sha'anan" (Neve Sha'anan's slopes) includes several neighborhoods in the north of Neve Sha'anan. These neighborhoods are inhabited by immigrants from various United States. In 2007, 14,890 residents lived in the quarter, which is about 40% of the total population of Neve Sha'anan - Jezreeliya. The slopes of Neve Sha'anan include the old neighborhoods of Halisa and Tel Amal, both of which were built before the establishment of the state of Israel, east of the Gesher Hagiborim (the heros' bridge) and along the transportation artery that forms the lower city and Neve Sha'anan, through Yad Labanim, and the streets that branch off from it. The Neve Paz neighborhood sits between Yad Lebanim Road and Shemen Beach. The main street, Carmeli Division, continues east and meets Derech Yaakov Dori in Neve Sha'anan.

==== Neve Yosef ====
Neve Yosef - intersection of Yad Labanim Road and Arad Street This neighborhood, named after Yosef Erdstein, the leader of Haifa workers during the Mandate period, is located in the northern foothills of Neve Sha'anan. The neighborhood was designed for the demobilized Jewish Brigade and was established in 1949 as a neighborhood for demobilized soldiers, both demobilized from the British Army and demobilized from the IDF. Its first houses were one-story houses and during the years of mass immigration, several high-rise residences with entrances were built there - many families that were immigrated from Wadi Salib as well as from other regions. Neve Yosef has a wide variety of populations, including veteran residents from North African countries, immigrants from the countries of the former Soviet Union and immigrants from Ethiopia. The boundaries of the neighborhood are: in the west the Tel-Amal neighborhood, in the north Neve Paz, and in the east Neve Ganim. There are two entrances to the neighborhood, the first from Derech Yad Labanim, and the second from Rabbi Mashasha Street to the street in the neighborhood - Arad Street; In Neve Yosef there is an active and developed community center, which holds activities for all ages and is an important anchor in the life of the neighborhood, and next to it is a religious high school for girls - Urban 6, from the AMIT studio chain, which opened in 1965. Until 2005, when it moved to Kiryat Shmuel, Sha'anan College, the religious academic college for education, also operated on the school's campus. The Neve Yosef community center hosts every summer, since 2005, the Neve Yosef Community Theater Festival in collaboration with the Department of Theater of the University of Haifa.

==== Neve Paz ====
Neve Paz was established after Amal, and is located between Yad Road and Labin in Shemen Beach. To the south of it is the Neve Yosef neighborhood. The main street is Hativat Carmeli Street. Its population is relatively young, many children. Construction continued in the 1990s to house many immigrants. Until 2009, two elementary schools, "Gabrieli" and "Kishon", operated in Benue Paz, but with the decrease in the enrollment of students, it was decided to close the "Kishon" school. In the neighborhood there is also a seminar for Arab teachers and kindergarten teachers, and a large facility of the electric company.

==== Neve Ganim ====
Neve Ganim is the name of a neighborhood that began in the 21st century, stretching between Neve Paz and Neve Yosef. In the neighborhood is the Yeshiva "Ohel Yehoshua" of the Belez Chassidim.

==== Old Neve Sha'anan ====
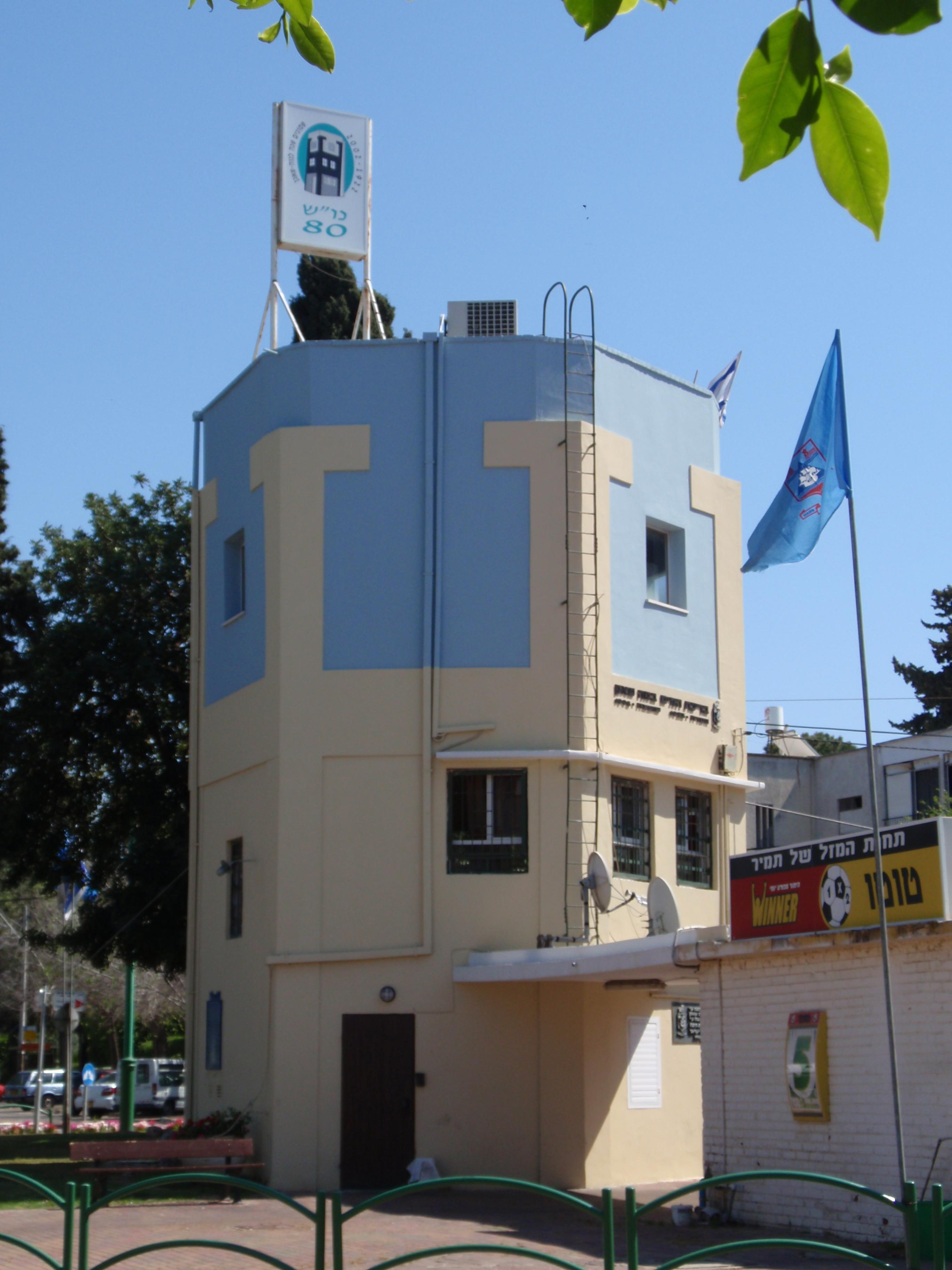
Neve Sha'anan water tower

The historical Neve Sha'anan expanded from its establishment in the 1920s until the War of Independence. The neighborhood includes the eastern part of Trumpeldor Boulevard and HaGalil and Hanita streets and the lateral streets that cross them. Its first houses were built in 1922, but a consular construction boom took place in the days of the fourth revolution. It developed and established its image as a neighborhood of workers and teachers, identified with socialist Zionism. Already in the 1920s it was decided to pave a road that would connect the neighborhood to Haifa. The work was handed over to Kibbutz "Hashomer Ha'Tsa'ir B" of the Shumaria Battalion, whose members founded the Mishmar HaEmek and were out of work after the construction of the Haifa-Jeddah road was completed. In 2007, about 10,860 people lived in the old Neve Sha'anan. In the neighborhood stands the water tower, which is a heritage site, and a variety of schools and kindergartens, including the "Tel Hai" elementary school, where the Hagana built 2 selikims, and a middle school and urban high school 3 named after Zalman Aren. Four nursing homes in the neighborhood. At the disposal of the religious citizens of Neve Sha'anan are eight synagogues, a state-religious school "Rambam", a high yeshiva and the Seder Or and Yeshua yeshiva, a religious community center and branches of the youth movements Bnei Akiva and Ariel, at the disposal of Bnei Akiva and Ariel, at the disposal of ultra-Orthodox citizens "Nachlat" assembly and meeting. In the House of the Workers' Council is the cinema "Inma Cafe Ami", one of the outdoor cinemas inside a shopping mall. The "Noash Camp" of the Olim camps is one of two camps of the movement in Neve Sha'anan (the other in Ramot Remez). The boys' garden In the old neighborhood near the intersection of Havanim-Hagalil-Hatinah-Hanita-Eilat streets you can find a public garden called

===== Gan Habanim =====
The garden is divided into three main parts: A monument commemorating the names of the boys who fell in the Israeli wars who lived in the neighborhood. It is present in a large part of the Great Sea where large ceremonies are held, the Holocaust and Heroic Remembrance Day ceremony, the IDF Martyrs' and Enemy Victims Memorial Day, and the Independence Day ceremony. A lawn where cultural events, attractions for children, and events initiated by the residents are held from time to time. A large playground with many facilities, swings, slides, and benches.

==== Jezreeliya ====
The Jezreeliya neighborhood, where about 10,770 people lived in 2007, was built after the clearing of the crossings and has high-rises and rows of "railway buildings". Its main street is Abba Hillel Silver Street. Here are the "Dinor" and "Jezreeliya" schools, and "Beit Abba Khushi" - a large cultural center. The first residential towers in Haifa were also built on Silver Street (numbers 111 and 113), in 1969 - they are 65 meters high. On the outskirts of the neighborhood, the "Sportech" garden was inaugurated in 1980, for the purpose of which Wadi Rushmia was filled with quarry waste for 4 years. Next to it, on the wadi slope, the "Grand Canyon" was built in 1999. On the western outskirts of Jezreeliya and Neve Sha'anan there was a British military camp where the legion soldiers were stationed during the Mandate. This camp then became one of the naval bases and was finally abandoned. The name of the neighborhood as the name of the company that purchased the land.

=== Ramot Neve Sha'anan district ===
The quarter is divided into 2 sub-quarters: Ziv-Ramat Alon and Ramez-Ramat Sapir.

==== Ziv sub-district - Ramat Alon ====
As of 2007, this sub-district is home to approximately 9,720 people.

===== Ziv =====
The Ziv neighborhood, the central one among the Neve Sha'anan neighborhoods, was established a few years after the establishment of Neve Sha'anan. In the 1930s, Abba Ziv (died in 1946) immigrated from Riga, Latvia to Haifa, founded (together with Yosef Katznelbogen) the company "Bonei Haifa" and purchased about 300 dunams from the West and from the American Zion community, on which he built neighborhood. The first houses were occupied in 1936. The construction is mostly low, and is characterized by wide yards and a large distance between houses. Most of the buildings are from the 1950s and 1960s. Since the 1990s, many houses were purchased, demolished and in their place were built houses with several floors and sometimes two buildings on the same lot. The expanded neighborhood includes the western part of Trumpeldor Boulevard, Shalom Aleichem and Gilboa Streets, Berel Katznelson Street - which surrounds Ziv in a semi-circle, as well as the small neighborhoods "Shahar" (when it was founded it was called "Naot Shahar", later it was renamed "Ben Square -earthly") and "Bemsila" ("Shikon Solel Bona"). At the intersection of Sderot Trumpeldor and Shalom Aleichem Street there used to be a traffic square with a fountain, but with the widening of the road, the fountain was moved to the square of the adjacent commercial center, and was later completely eliminated. The identification of "Ziv Square" is done with the extension and with the intersection. The streets leading out of the square, namely Trumpeldor Boulevard and Shalom Aleichem and Berel streets, have always served as the main business center for the entire Neve Sha'anan, where you can find bank branches, offices, restaurants and shops of all kinds. Near the square there used to be the "Ziv" cinema, which was closed, as well as a supermarket that for decades belonged to the cooperative association "The Consumer" and was sold to the ultra-Orthodox "Bar Khol" chain. In the neighborhood is the municipal public library named after Sh. Hello, and next to it is the committee house. The "Bari Open School" is also in the neighborhood, and there is also a Ken of the Homer Hatzair and a Ken of the working and learning youth. To the east of it, next to Kiryat Technion, is the municipal athletics stadium and sports center.

===== Kiryat Technion =====
Kiryat Technion, established in the 1950s not far from Ziv Square, is home to the Technion, one of the most outstanding and prestigious academic institutions in Israel. The Kariya is a campus that covers 1,325 dunams and includes study buildings, laboratories and dormitory buildings for students, junior faculty and families with children. It borders on its eastern side with Nesher. The cornerstone for Kiryat Technion was laid in 1953. Occupancy of the complex began in the 1960s and continued even at the beginning of the 21st century. For a long time, studies were conducted on the Technion's two campuses, the one in Hadar and the one in Benush, but since 1986 only Kiryat Technion has been used by the institution. The historic building in Hadar was converted into the National Museum of Science, Technology and Space and some of the buildings around it were handed over to the school at the SMT until it was closed in -2007.

===== Ramat Alon =====
This neighborhood, as well as the main street in it, are named after Yigal Alon. The construction of the neighborhood, located in the south of Neve Sha'anan, was approved by the city council in 1981. Groundbreaking began in July 1985, and the first houses began to be built in 1986. Ramat Alon is bordered to the east by the Technion, to the west by Ramot Ramez, to the north by Ziv, and to the south and southwest by Dania. The majority of its residents are young families, students and permanent army personnel, who were the original population at the time of its planning. There are about 2,000 households in the neighborhood. Ramat Alon is home to the "Alon" elementary school, the "Yavna" high school ("Yeshiva Tikhonit"), the "Ramot" community center and two commercial centers. In 2008, the Garden of the Righteous Among the Nations Residents of Haifa was inaugurated in the neighborhood, named after the eighteen Righteous Among the Nations who lived in Haifa. The Wall of the Crows is the name of an archaeological site located north of the neighborhood at the foot of a cliff located near the access road to the Technion (Meir Yaari Street), and it includes a cave and several alcoves where tools were found indicating a prehistoric settlement. About 60 meters north of the cliff, a large building was discovered that was used, apparently as an agricultural farm from the Hellenistic period. The wall is used today by wall climbers.

==== Remez sub-district - Ramot Sapir ====
===== Ramot Sapir =====
About 9,730 people lived in this sub-district in 2007.

==== Ramot Remez ====
The first houses of Ramot Remez, an old neighborhood founded in 1949, were built in low-rise construction along International Street, Hankin Road opposite it and in the small streets branching off International, in a typical layout of two-story houses with red tiled roofs. The construction contractor was Solel Bona. In the beginning, the neighborhood, named after David Ramez, was used as housing for veterans for the working class, mainly for veterans of the General Histadrut, and as housing for members of the permanent army (Shachak) on Dorot, Hala and Borchov streets. With the establishment of the state, it developed, and between the 1950s and the 1970s, many housing estates were also built in its western and southern parts. This is where the Pliman Geriatric-Rehabilitation Center is located, as well as an active community center on Borla Street (named "Dania Club") and a community center "Beit Ha'Hadezimim". In the neighborhood there is an Afik tribe of the Hebrew Scouts, a camp for the immigrant camps, and "Habonim" elementary schools that are active in the neighborhood The beginning of the days of the neighborhood and "Pichman" which was named after the paratrooper of the settlement Aryeh Pichman. Ramot Ramez is popular among students (25% of its population in 2004) due to its location between the Technion and Haifa University and its relatively low prices. It is wooded on all sides and also now there is a supermarket "yarok" in dorot street, barber shop and kiosk in International street and a park and another park in borchov.

==== Ramot Sapir ====
Ramot Sapir (or Ramat Sapir), named after Pinchas Sapir, is located in the western entrances of Neve Sha'anan, and borders Romma. It was established in the early 1980s as a single, circular street, named after Moshe Gotel Levin. A decade later, more houses were built on a new street named after Kadish Luz and later, high-rises in the Pisgat-Sapir project, a scale model of which is in Mini Israel. The commercial center of the neighborhood developed following the increase in the number of housing units built there. A community center operates in the neighborhood, with a community garden "Ginat Elad" adjacent to it.

==== Ramat Chen ====
The construction of the neighborhood was completed in the first decade of the 21st century on a hill that used to be called "Contractors' Hill" to the east of Ramot Sapir, and is bordered to the south by Hankin Road, to the west by Nahal Ramez and Ramot Sapir, to the north by Nahal Sha'anan and Simcha Golan Road, and to the east by the Ziv neighborhood. This is a small neighborhood, in 2007 about 1,600 people lived there, and the main part is terraced houses and cottages. It attracts a middle-upper class population. At the edge of the neighborhood, a luxury sheltered housing building named "Pisgat Chen" was built, founded by the organization of Central European immigrants.

==== Ramat Zemer ====
Ramat Zemer is a planned neighborhood, planned to be built on "Givat Ofer" between Ramot Ramez and Romema, and has 849 housing units on an area of about 100 dunams. The boundaries of the neighborhood are expected to be Hankin Road to the north, Ramot Ramez to the east, Pliman Hospital and Ramat Almogi to the south, and Givat Oranim to the west. In February 2021, the city council approved changing the name of the neighborhood to Ramat Eric, after the singer, actor and creator Eric Einstein. In addition, it was confirmed that the squares will be named after the bands the Dodaim, Meshina, Hagavetron, Halb and Dvash, and Korat, and the streets will be named after Yaffe Yarkoni, Shoshana Demari, Ehud Manor, Naomi Shemer, Yossi Banai, Yehuda Amichai, Ofra Haza, Yohoram Gaon and Jordana Arzi. Reasons for opposition to the establishment of the neighborhood included: allocating open-green space for residences and utilizing the infrastructure of the neighboring neighborhoods, especially roads, to connect to central infrastructures, something that would damage the quiet nature of those neighborhoods. A new neighborhood is also expected to lower the value of apartments in the neighborhoods next to it.

== The Religious Community ==
Since the establishment of the neighborhood, religious people have lived there alongside the secular majority. At the beginning of the 21st century, the religious community in Neve Sha'anan numbered over 1,000 families, most of them from the religious Zionist movement, and the other are from the ultra-orthodox community.

=== The religious Zionist Community ===
The religious Zionist Community maintains many synagogues where they pray in different traditions and styles. The kindergartens of the residents of the religious community of Neve Sha'anan are scattered throughout the neighborhood, where many generations of the religious descendants of the residents of the neighborhood have been educated.

The community and its institutions are mainly concentrated in two areas:

==== The Rambam Religious Center ====
The Rambam communal-religious includes the Rambam school, and also there are a large number of synagogues, located side by side, which allows the members of the community to easily reach the various joys, and to talk in the central square after the prayer, which brings the community to be a warm and united community. All the synagogues have "official" names, but many of them are called by other names by the residents (such as: the rabbi's synagogue, the "Aquarium" (named after its transparent walls), the "Tzaddikim" because of starting prayer earlier on Shabbat, etc.).

The complex also operates a religious cultural center for youth, which is responsible for activities such as plays, classes, lectures, and hosting cantors; The H. Aivshitz Institute for Holocaust Studies and the neighborhood branch of the Bnei Akiva movement are also part of this complex. The branch has a memorial room for residents of the community who fell in the army or in terrorist attacks. The complex also has a playground, for the benefit of worshipers' children and school students, as well as a reference library. On Thursdays there is a "Notnim Be'ahava" (Giving with Love) organization where in the morning teenagers unload trucks and food containers and pack everything into packages and in the afternoon and evening they distribute the packages to families in need.

Rabbi Chaim Naftali Weissbloom was the rabbi of the neighborhood, and was also accepted by the ultra-orthodox community. He led the community for about 50 years. Rabbi Weissbloom led the community until his death, on the eve of Sukkot 2015. Today, the rabbi of the Rambam community is Rabbi Eliyahu Blum, former head of the Nahar-Dea yeshiva in Nahariya.

==== "Or Vishua" yeshiva ====
The second complex is the complex of the Torani-Leumi (religious Zionist) Center of the Or Vishua (Light and Salvation) Yeshiva led by Rabbi Eliyahu Rahamim Zeini, and in addition to the High Yeshiva and the Hesder Yeshiva, there are also Ashkenazi, Sephardi and Yemenite synagogues, where Torah classes for children, lectures and other events are held. In this center are the main kindergartens of the Or Vishua community, where about 150 children are educated each year. In 2015, a branch of the Ariel youth movement was established in the complex.

=== The ultra-orthodox community ===
The ultra-Orthodox community in Neve Sha'anan numbers about four hundred and fifty families.

Rabbi Shlomo Topurowitz and his sons Amichai and Emanuel who lived in the Neve Sha'anan neighborhood set themselves the goal of establishing an ultra-Orthodox nucleus in the neighborhood. Initially, the family initiated the establishment of a yeshiva, but it was closed after a short time. In 1984, the family built a shack on part of a public garden that served as a small neighborhood synagogue, around which formed a small group of ultra-Orthodox who rented apartments in the area. During the 1980s, a yeshiva "Nachlat HaLeviim" was established on the synagogue's grounds and the area adjacent to it under the leadership of Rabbis Israel Meir Weiss and Ori Weissbloom. The yeshiva succeeded in recruiting students and donations, and the family turned to establishing a nucleus of ultra-Orthodox families around the yeshiva.
