= Yeshivat Or Vishua =

Hesder yeshiva in Haifa, Israel

Coordinates: 32°47′09″N 35°01′02″E

Yeshivat Or Vishua is a hesder yeshiva located in the Neve Sha'anan neighborhood of Haifa. Its head is Rabbi Eliyahu Zini, who is also the former rabbi of the nearby Technion university.

Its name means "Yeshiva of Light and Redemption".

Its population includes many people who are or were associated with the Technion, as well as many French immigrants, and other people who live in Haifa and its suburbs.
