= David Zini =

Israeli Shin Bet head (b. 1974)

- דוד זיני
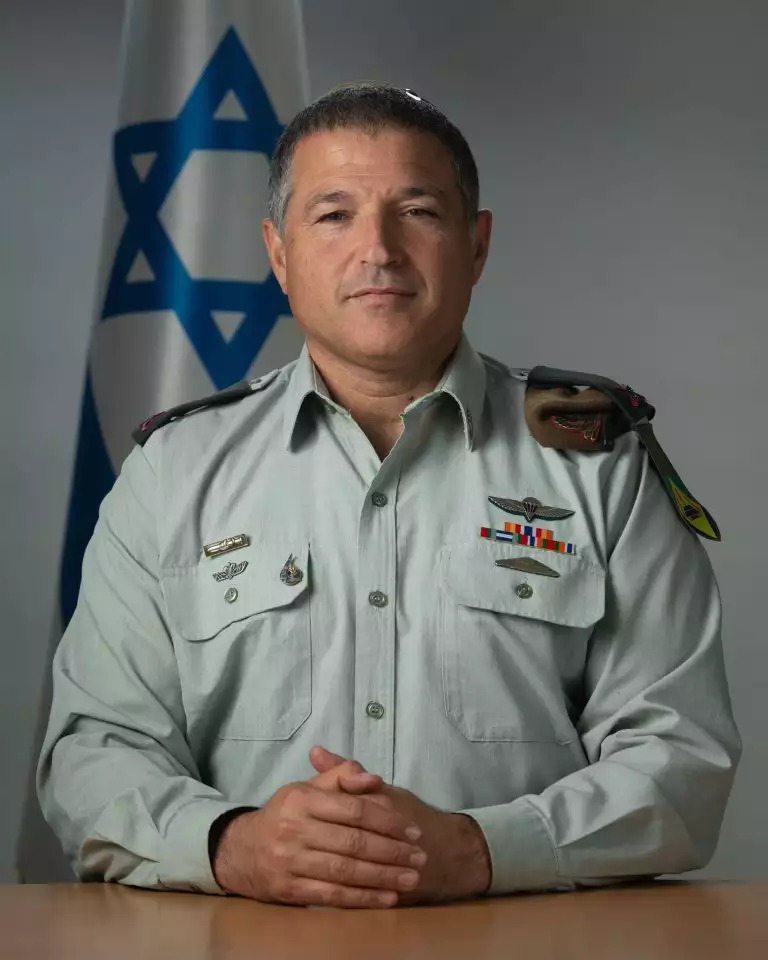
- Official Portrait, 2023
- Born: 9 January 1974 (age 52); Jerusalem, Israel
- Military career
- Allegiance: Shin Bet, Israeli Defence Forces
- Service years: Shin Bet: 2025– Israel Defense Forces: 1992–2025
- Rank: Major General (aluf)
- Conflicts: South Lebanon conflict (1985–2000); Operation Defensive Shield; 2006 Lebanon war; 2009 Gaza war; 2014 Gaza war; Gaza war

David Zini (Hebrew: דוד זיני; born 9 January 1974) is a retired Israel Defense Forces major general, who is serving as the head of the Shin Bet since 5 October 2025. Formerly he served as the head of Training Command and the commander of the General Staff Corps. He also held positions such as the commander of Malach, the commander of the Company and Battalion Commanders Course, the commander of the Idan Formation, the founder and commander of the Oz Brigade, the commander of the Fire Training Center at Malach, the commander of the Alexandroni Brigade, the commander of the Egoz Unit, and the commander of the 51st Battalion.

In 2025, he was appointed as chief of the Shin Bet by Israeli Prime Minister Benjamin Netanyahu. The Cabinet of Israel approved his appointment on 30 September, and his term began on 5 October.

== Biography ==
Zini was born in Jerusalem and raised in Ashdod. He is the son of Rabbi Yosef and Pnina Zini, with his father later becoming the rabbi of District D in Ashdod. He is the eldest of ten children. His uncle is Rabbi Dr. Eliahu Rahamim Zini and his grandfather is Rabbi Meir Zini. In his youth, he studied at Morasha Talmud Torah in Jerusalem, Hispin Yeshiva High School, Yeshiva Shavei Hebron, and the Keshet Yehuda Pre-Military Academy.

He enlisted in the IDF in 1992 and volunteered for the Sayeret Matkal unit. After basic training with the Paratroopers Brigade, he completed the unit's training program as a combat soldier. After finishing the course, he served for a year in an operational company within the unit. After completing the Infantry Officers Course, he transferred to the Golani Brigade, where he was assigned as a platoon commander in the 12th Battalion. Later, he became the commander of the 3rd spearhead company in the 12th Battalion, leading it during the fighting in southern Lebanon. He then commanded Company A in the Egoz Unit. During Operation Defensive Shield, he was on a study break. He interrupted his studies and returned to the brigade until the end of the operation. Later, he became the deputy commander of the 51st Battalion. Afterward, he was the commander of the advanced training cycle at the Golani Training Base. During the Second Lebanon War, he served as the commander of the Golani Brigade's operational command post.

In 2006, he was promoted to the rank of lieutenant colonel and appointed commander of the 51st Battalion, a position he held until 2008. In March 2007, he dealt with a mutiny of battalion soldiers after he stopped negative norms related to the differences between veterans and new recruits. In July 2007, under his command, the battalion launched operations in Gaza that continued until February 2008. During this period, he led the battalion in the fighting in the Gaza Strip from the Disengagement to Operation Cast Lead, involving dozens of operations in which numerous militants were killed, weapon caches were discovered, and militant infrastructures were destroyed. For its prolonged and determined combat efforts, the battalion received a unit citation on 27 April 2008, from the commander of the Southern Command, Yoav Galant. In 2008, he was appointed commander of the Egoz Unit, leading it during Operation Cast Lead. In 2010, he completed his role and went for further studies.

In 2011, he was promoted to the rank of colonel and appointed commander of the Alexandroni Brigade, and a division head in the Company and Battalion Commanders Course. In 2013, he simultaneously served as the commander of the Fire Training Center at Malach. During Operation Protective Edge, following the injury of the Golani Brigade commander, Ghassan Alian, Zini was temporarily appointed as his replacement, leading the brigade during the continued Battle of Shuja'iyya in eastern Gaza. He completed these roles in 2014. He then served as the operations officer of the Central Command from 2014 to 2015. On 6 July 2015, he was tasked with establishing the Oz Brigade, and assumed his role as its first commander on 27 December. He completed his tenure on 17 August 2017. He then attended the National Defense College (class 45, 2017–2018).

On 29 January 2018, he was promoted to the rank of brigadier general, and on 31 January, he assumed command of the Idan Formation. While simultaneously serving as the commander of the Company and Battalion Commanders Course from 2019 to 2020. He served as the commander of the Idan Formation until 10 September 2020. On 24 June 2020, he was appointed commander of Malach, and he held the position until 27 October 2022.

On 1 June 2023, he was promoted to the rank of Aluf, and on 5 July, he assumed his roles as the commander of the Training and Doctrine Command and the commander of the General Staff Corps. On 7 October 2023, immediately upon learning of the surprise attack on Israel, he rushed from his home in the Golan Heights to the south, fighting alongside forces on the ground and neutralizing militant cells that had infiltrated from the Gaza Strip into the area near Kibbutz Mefalsim, participating in the Battle of Mefalsim. During Operation Iron Swords, it was revealed that in May 2023, he authored a classified document following a comprehensive, multi-system review he conducted on IDF activities along the fence with the Gaza Strip in response to various scenarios. At the request of Gaza Division Commander Brigadier General Avi Rosenfeld, Zini outlined extreme scenarios, including the infiltration of militants under complete intelligence surprise, and recommended the necessary responses, concluding with remarks about the "concept" formed around the fence.

Following the departure of Major General Avi Gil from the role of military secretary to the prime minister, Zini's name was raised as a candidate, and Prime Minister Benjamin Netanyahu even interviewed him for the possibility. Amid the possibility of new draft legislation during Operation Iron Swords, Zini was involved in the initiative to establish a new Haredi brigade, enabling ultra-Orthodox integration into the IDF while maintaining their values and subject to the rulings of the Haredi leadership. To this end, he met with Rabbi David Leibel in Bnei Brak, and upon leaving the meeting, his vehicle was attacked by extremists.

On 22 May 2025, Netanyahu appointed Zini as the next Shin Bet chief following the resignation of Ronen Bar, though the Supreme Court of Israel had earlier declared the forced early termination of Bar "unlawful". Following his appointment, he retired from the IDF on 6 June after 33 years of service. On 25 September, a government advisory body called the Grunis Committee approved Zini's nomination as Shin Bet chief. On 30 September, the Cabinet of Israel unanimously voted to approve Zini's appointment to a five-year term as chief of the Shin Bet. His term began on 5 October.

== Controversies ==
On 30 June 2026, Haaretz reported, citing activist accounts and information obtained, that Shin Bet under Zini had increased efforts in recent weeks to recruit activists involved in anti-government protests ahead of the 2026 Israeli legislative election, offering financial incentives and other benefits in exchange for information on planned demonstrations and right-wing counterprotesters.

In early July 2026, a recording of a speech Zini gave at his yeshiva alma mater was released, in which he said that he took the position of head of Shin Bet because “I felt that I was qualified, maybe even more than others, in my ability to be loyal to the elected leadership, no matter the opinion” and that “I have an agenda, I want to advance it — that is my responsibility. This is my job. I need to be the locomotive. On the other hand, I must be modest toward elected officials." His statements created what was described by the Jerusalem Post as a "political storm", with the former head of Shin Bet, Yoram Cohen, saying “The sole loyalty of the head of a security body and any public office holder is first and foremost to the State of Israel, its laws and its citizens,” and leader of the Democrats Party, Yair Golan, describing Zini's words as "one of the most dangerous statements ever made by someone who headed Israel’s security system." National Security Minister Itamar Ben-Gvir defended Zini's comments, saying they were "the fundamental thing in a democratic country."

On 29 July 2026, Zini allowed the far-right Kahanist party A Whole and Strong Jewish Israel, led by former leading Kach activists Baruch Marzel and Michael Ben Ari, to run in the election, going against a decision previously made by the Shin Bet.

== Personal life ==
In 2025, Zini moved from Keshet in the Golan Heights to Jerusalem. He is married to Naomi, and is the father of eleven children. He holds a bachelor's degree in Education and a master's degree in National Security and Public Administration from the National Defense College.
