= 1937 Ben-Gurion letter =

Letter written by David Ben-Gurion to his son

David Ben-Gurion, then head of the executive committee of the Jewish Agency, wrote a letter to his son Amos on 5 October 1937. The letter is well known to scholars as it provides insight into Ben-Gurion's reaction to the report of the Peel Commission released on 7 July of the same year.

The letter has also been subject to significant debate by scholars as a result of scribbled-out text that may or may not provide written evidence of an intention to "expel the Arabs" or "not expel the Arabs" depending on one's interpretation of whether such deletion was intended by Ben-Gurion.

The original handwritten letter is currently held in the IDF Archive.

== Letter ==
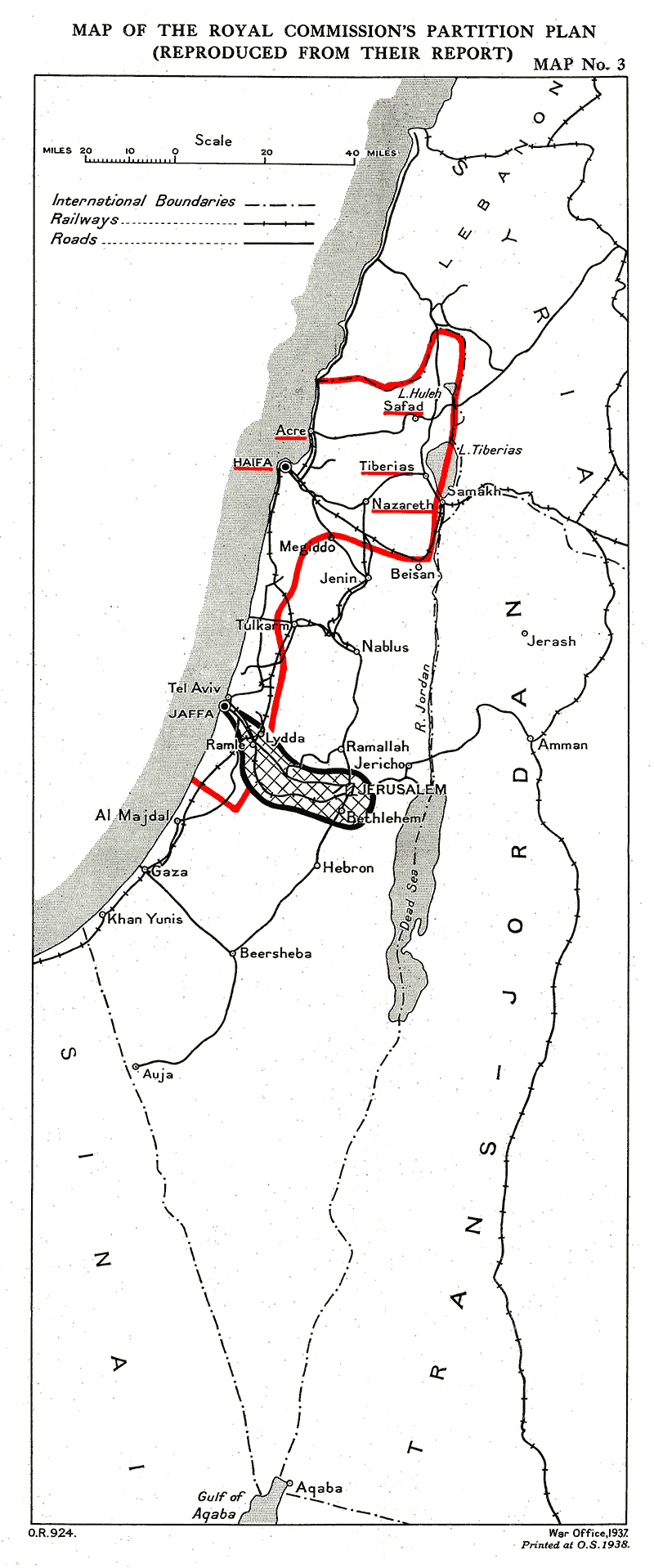
Peel Commission Report partition proposal. The red line shows the proposed Jewish State.

The letter was originally handwritten in Hebrew by Ben-Gurion, and was intended to update his son, Amos, who was then living on a kibbutz, on the latest political considerations. In the letter, Ben-Gurion explains his reaction to the July 1937 Peel Commission Report by providing arguments for why his son should not be concerned about the recommended partition of Mandatory Palestine. The Commission had recommended partition into a Jewish State and Arab State, together with a population transfer of the 225,000 Arabs from the land allocated to the Jewish State. Ben-Gurion stated his belief that partition would be just the beginning. The sentiment was recorded by Ben-Gurion on other occasions, such as at a meeting of the Jewish Agency executive in June 1938, as well as by Chaim Weizmann. In the letter, Ben-Gurion wrote:

"Does the establishment of a Jewish state [in only part of Palestine] advance or retard the conversion of this country into a Jewish country? My assumption (which is why I am a fervent proponent of a state, even though it is now linked to partition) is that a Jewish state on only part of the land is not the end but the beginning.... This is because this increase in possession is of consequence not only in itself, but because through it we increase our strength, and every increase in strength helps in the possession of the land as a whole. The establishment of a state, even if only on a portion of the land, is the maximal reinforcement of our strength at the present time and a powerful boost to our historical endeavors to liberate the entire country".

The Peel Commission had allocated the Negev desert to the Arab state on account of the very limited Jewish settlement in the region. Ben-Gurion argued in the letter that the allocation of the Negev to the Arab State would ensure it remained barren because the Arabs "already have an abundance of deserts but not of manpower, financial resources, or creative initiative". Ben-Gurion noted that force may need to be used to ensure the Jewish right to settle in the area since "we can no longer tolerate that vast territories capable of absorbing tens of thousands of Jews should remain vacant, and that Jews cannot return to their homeland because the Arabs prefer that the place [the Negev] remains neither ours nor theirs."

== Disputed text ==
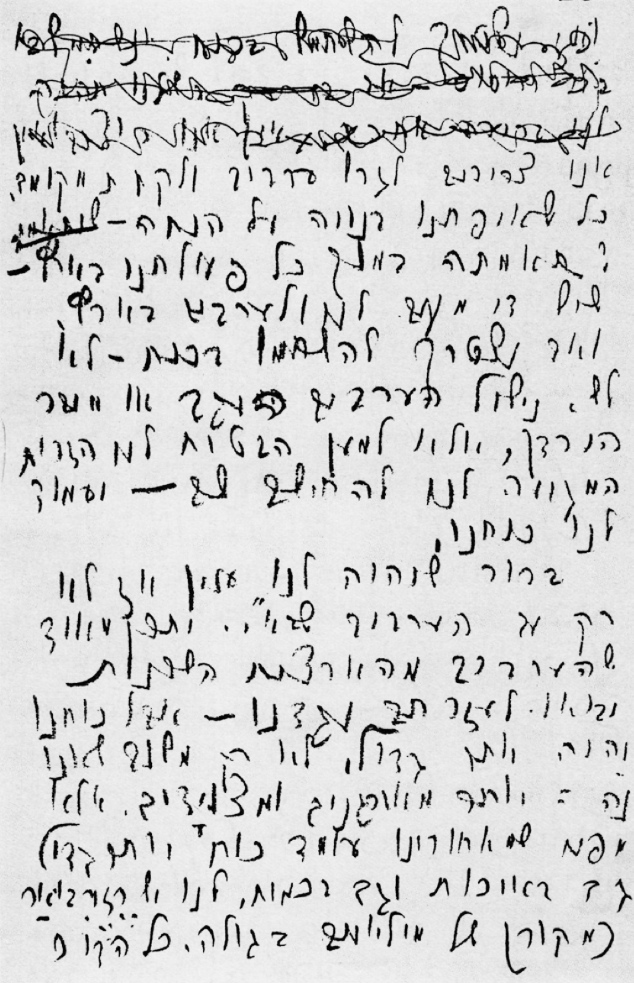
Extract of the letter showing the disputed text at the top.

Benny Morris, in his 1988 The Birth of the Palestinian Refugee Problem, 1947-1949, quoted from Ben-Gurion's letter in the paragraph discussing the Negev: "We must expel Arabs and take their places...", having taken the quote from the English version of Shabtai Teveth's 1985 Ben-Gurion and the Palestine Arabs. Criticism from Efraim Karsh later discussed the scribbled-out text immediately before the wording, which, if included, would reverse the meaning of the quote.

Morris later explained, "The problem was that in the original handwritten copy of the letter deposited in the IDF Archive, which I consulted after my quote was criticized, there were several words crossed out in the middle of the relevant sentence, rendering what remained as "We must expel the Arabs". However, Ben-Gurion rarely made corrections to anything he had written, and the passage was not consonant with the spirit of the paragraph in which it was embedded. It was suggested that the crossing out was done by some other hand later and that the sentence, when the words that were crossed out were restored, was meant by Ben-Gurion to say and said exactly the opposite ("We must not expel the Arabs....')."

As to the general tenor of the critique, Morris later wrote that "the focus by my critics on this quotation was, in any event, nothing more than (an essentially mendacious) red herring – as elsewhere, in unassailable statements, Ben-Gurion at this time repeatedly endorsed the idea of 'transferring' (or expelling) Arabs, or the Arabs, out of the area of the Jewish state-to-be, either 'voluntarily' or by compulsion. There were good reasons for Ben-Gurion's endorsement of transfer: The British Peel Commission had proposed it, the Arabs rebelling in Palestine were bent on uprooting the Zionist enterprise, and the Jews of Europe, under threat of destruction, were in dire need of a safe haven, and Palestine could not serve as one so long as the Arabs were attacking the Yishuv and, as a result, the British were curtailing Jewish access to the country."

Ilan Pappe, in his 2006 article The 1948 Ethnic Cleansing of Palestine, published as a preamble to his later book The Ethnic Cleansing of Palestine, quoted Ben-Gurion as having written, "The Arabs will have to go, but one needs an opportune moment for making it happen, such as a war". In the first edition of the full book the inverted commas were around only the words "The Arabs will have to go". It was later stated by Nick Talbot that the second part of the sentence, mistakenly originally published in inverted commas, was a "fair and accurate paraphrase" of the sources Pappe provided, a July 12, 1937, entry in Ben-Gurion's journal and page 220 of the August–September 1937 issue of New Judea. Pappe's error was first pointed out by Benny Morris in 2006, and taken up by advocacy group CAMERA in 2011. The Journal of Palestine Studies wrote in 2012: "This issue is the more cogent in view of an article (by a CAMERA official) that claims that the quote attributed to Ben-Gurion (as it appears in the JPS article) is a complete fabrication, a 'fake'. Even taking into account the punctuation error, this contention is totally at odds with the known record of Ben-Gurion's position at least as of the late 1930s." CAMERA had provided the original, handwritten letter by Ben-Gurion and charged not only that the pertinent phrase had been incorrectly translated but also that the article incorrectly interpreted the context of the letter.
