= Racism in Israel =

Racism in Israel encompasses all forms and manifestations of racism experienced in Israel, irrespective of the colour or creed of the perpetrator and victim, or their citizenship, residency, or visitor status. More specifically in the Israeli context, racism in Israel refers to racism directed against Israeli Arabs by Israeli Jews, intra-Jewish racism between the various Jewish ethnic divisions (in particular against Ethiopian Jews), historic and current racism towards Mizrahi Jews although some believe the dynamics have reversed, and racism on the part of Israeli Arabs against Israeli Jews.

Racism on the part of Israeli Jews against Arabs in Israel exists in institutional policies, personal attitudes, the media, education, immigration rights, housing, social life and legal policies. Some elements within the Ashkenazi Israeli Jewish population have also been described as holding discriminatory attitudes towards fellow Jews of other backgrounds, including against Ethiopian Jews, Indian Jews, Mizrahi Jews, Sephardi Jews, etc. Although intermarriage between Ashkenazim and Sephardim/Mizrahim is increasingly common in Israel, and social integration is constantly improving, disparities continue to persist. Ethiopian Jews in particular have faced discrimination from non-Black Jews. It has been suggested that the situation of the Ethiopian Jews as 'becoming white' is similar to that of some European immigrants like Poles and Italians who arrived in the United States in the late nineteenth and early twentieth centuries.

Israel has broad anti-discrimination laws that prohibit discrimination by both government and non-government entities on the basis of race, religion, and political beliefs, and prohibits incitement to racism. The Israeli government and many groups within Israel have undertaken efforts to combat racism. Israel is a state-party to the Convention on the Elimination of All Forms of Racial Discrimination, and is a signatory of the Convention against Discrimination in Education. Israel's President Reuven Rivlin announced to a meeting of academics in October 2014 that it is finally time for Israel to live up to its promise as a land of equality, time to cure the epidemic of racism. "Israeli society is sick, and it is our duty to treat this disease", Rivlin stated.

== Groups subjected to racism ==
=== Racism against Arabs by Israeli Jews ===
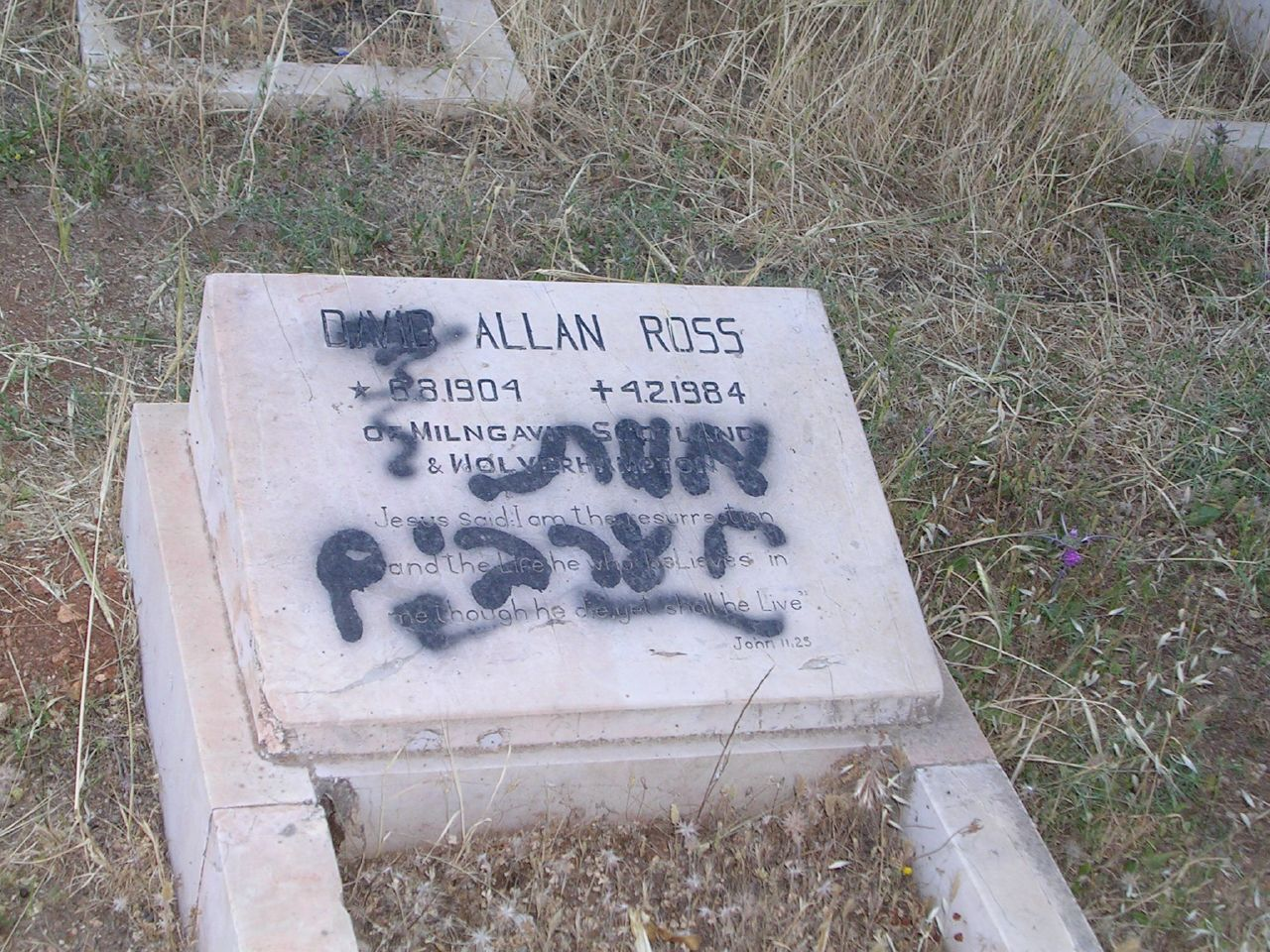
Vandalized grave. The graffiti says "death to Arabs" (מוות לערבים, mavet laArabim).

Racism against Arab citizens of Israel on the part of the Israeli state and some Israeli Jews has been identified by critics in personal attitudes, the media, education, immigration rights, housing segregation, and social life. Nearly all such characterizations have been denied by the state of Israel. The Or Commission, set up to explain the October 2000 unrest in many Israeli Arab communities found,

"The state and generations of its government failed in a lack of comprehensive and deep handling of the serious problems created by the existence of a large Arab minority inside the Jewish state. Government handling of the Arab sector has been primarily neglectful and discriminatory. The establishment did not show sufficient sensitivity to the needs of the Arab population, and did not take enough action in order to allocate state resources in an equal manner. The state did not do enough or try hard enough to create equality for its Arab citizens or to uproot discriminatory or unjust phenomenon."

According to the 2004 U.S. State Department Country Reports on Human Rights Practices for Israel and the Occupied Territories, the Israeli government had done "little to reduce institutional, legal, and societal discrimination against the country's Arab citizens". The 2005 U.S. Department of State report on Israel wrote: "[T]he government generally respected the human rights of its citizens; however, there were problems in some areas, including ... institutional, legal, and societal discrimination against the country's Arab citizens." The 2010 U.S. State Department Country Report stated that Israeli law prohibits discrimination on the basis of race, and that government effectively enforced these prohibitions. Former Likud MK and Minister of Defense Moshe Arens has criticized the treatment of minorities in Israel, saying that they did not bear the full obligation of Israeli citizenship, nor were they extended the full privileges of citizenship.

Israel is a state-party to the Convention on the Elimination of All Forms of Racial Discrimination. The 1998 Report of the UN Committee on the Elimination of Racial Discrimination found that the Convention "is far from fully implemented in Israel and the Occupied Palestinian Territory, and that the shortfall contributes very significantly to the dangerous escalation of tension in the region". The report positively noted the measures taken by Israel to prohibit the activities of racist political parties, the amendment of the Equal Opportunity in Employment Law, prohibiting discrimination in the labour sphere on the grounds of national ethnic origin, country of origin, beliefs, political views, political party, affiliation or age, and the Israeli efforts to reduce and eventually eradicate the economic and educational gap between the Jewish majority and the Arab minority.

Since 2011, Israeli nationalists have made anti-Palestinian chants such as "death to Arabs" (Israeli Hebrew: מָוֶת לָעֲרָבִים, romanized: Mávet la'Aravím) in parades on Jerusalem Day. Other chants include "May Your Village Burn," "Muhammad is dead," "a Jew is a soul, an Arab is a son of a whore," "burn Shu'afat" or "Shu'afat is on fire" in reference to the Palestinian neighborhood in East Jerusalem where a Palestinian boy was kidnapped and set on fire, as well as the Hebrew curse with Biblical origins for enemies of the Jewish people "may their name be erased." According to Nadera Shalhoub-Kevorkian, the Jerusalem Day parade is a "spatialized enactment of power," and in 2015, "over 30,000 young religious and nationalist Israeli Jews rampaged throughout the Old City of OEJ chanting 'Death to Arabs', 'Muhammad is Dead' and other racist slogans, restructuring the sensory experiences of Palestinians in the space."

==== Polls ====
The Association for Civil Rights in Israel (ACRI) published reports documenting racism in Israel, and the 2007 report suggested that anti-Arab racism in the country was increasing. One analysis of the report summarized it thus: "Over two-thirds of Israeli teens believe Arabs to be less intelligent, uncultured and violent. Over a third of Israeli teens fear Arabs all together ... The report becomes even grimmer, citing the ACRI's racism poll, taken in March 2007, in which 50% of Israelis taking part said they would not live in the same building as Arabs, will not befriend, or let their children befriend Arabs and would not let Arabs into their homes." The 2008 report from ACRI says the trend of increasing racism is continuing. An Israeli minister charged the poll as biased and not credible. The Israeli government spokesman responded that the Israeli government was "committed to fighting racism whenever it raises its ugly head and is committed to full equality to all Israeli citizens, irrespective of ethnicity, creed or background, as defined by our declaration of independence".

Another 2007 report, by the Center Against Racism, also found hostility against Arabs was on the rise. Among its findings, it reported that 75% of Israeli Jews do not approve of Arabs and Jews sharing apartment buildings; that over half of Jews would not want to have an Arab boss and that marrying an Arab amounts to "national treason"; and that 55% of the sample thought Arabs should be kept separate from Jews in entertainment sites. Half wanted the Israeli government to encourage Israeli Arabs to emigrate. About 40% believed Arab citizens should have their voting rights removed.

A March 2010 poll by Tel Aviv University found that 49.5% of Israeli Jewish high school students believe Israeli Arabs should not be entitled to the same rights as Jews in Israel. 56% believe Arabs should not be eligible to the Knesset, the Israeli parliament.

An October 2010 poll by the Dahaf polling agency found that 36% of Israeli Jews favor eliminating voting rights for non-Jews. 2003–2009 polling showed that between 42% and 56% of Israelis agreed that "Israeli Arabs suffer from discrimination as opposed to Jewish citizens"; 80% of Israeli Arabs agreed with that statement in 2009.

A 2012 poll revealed widespread support among Israeli Jews for discrimination against Israeli Arabs, including 33% of respondents believing Israeli Arabs should be denied the right to vote, 42% objecting to their children going to the same schools as Arabs, and 49% "[wanting] the state to treat Jews better than Arabs".

In November 2014, after two Arabs from East Jerusalem perpetrated a massacre in a Jerusalem synagogue by using axes, knives, and a gun, the mayor of Ashkelon, Itamar Shimoni, announced that he planned to fire city construction workers who were Arab. His action brought a storm of protest from politicians, as well as the prime minister and president. Police in Ashkelon said they would ignore Shimoni's directive and "obey the law". Nir Barkat, mayor of Jerusalem, said "We cannot discriminate the Arabs", and added, "I cannot help but think of where we were 70 years ago in Europe. We cannot generalize as they did to Jews. Here in Jerusalem, we have tens of thousands of Arab workers. We must make a clear distinction." Israeli Prime Minister Benjamin Netanyahu said "We should not discriminate against an entire public because of a small minority that is violent and militant." Intelligence Minister Yuval Steinitz said it is "sad that relations between Jews and Arabs will suffer because of some Jihadist fanatical terrorists." He said that on the one hand "one can understand the fear of parents of kindergarten children afraid someone will take a knife one day, as happened in the synagogue in Jerusalem, shout 'Allah Akhbar' and begin to attack." On the other hand, he said, "this is something that should be handled while keeping the generally good relations between Jews and Arabs." In spite of the almost universal condemnation of Shimoni's plan by Israeli politicians, a poll by Channel 10 showed that 58% of Israelis support the discriminatory practice, 32% did not approve and 10% did not know. At the end, the mayor changed his mind. Yehiel Lasri, mayor of nearby Ashdod, allegedly targeted Arab workers for extra security checks.

==== In the media ====
Some authors, such as David Hirsi and Ayala Emmet, have criticized the Israeli media for portraying Arabs negatively. The Israeli media has been described as "racist" in its portrayals of Israeli-Arabs and Palestinians by Israeli-Arab Nabilia Espanioly.

==== Education system ====
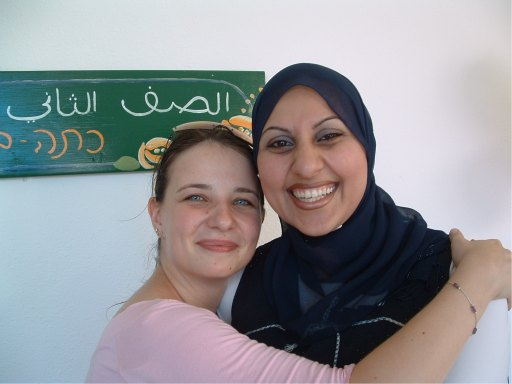
Jewish and Arab teachers at Hand in Hand, a network of bilingual schools that aims to promote coexistence between the Arab and Jewish populations of Israel

Israel is a signatory of the Convention against Discrimination in Education, and ratified it in 1961. The convention has the status of law in Israeli courts. Israeli Pupils’ Rights Law of 2000 prohibits discrimination of students for sectarian reasons in admission to or expulsion from educational institutions, in establishment of separate educational curricula or holding of separate classes in the same educational institution.

According to a 2001 report by Human Rights Watch, Israel's school systems for Arab and Jewish children are separate and have unequal conditions to the disadvantage of the Arab children who make up one-quarter of all students. Israeli law does not prohibit Palestinian Arab parents from enrolling their children in Jewish schools, but in practice, very few Palestinian Arab parents do so. The report stated that "Government-run Arab schools are a world apart from government-run Jewish schools. In virtually every respect, Palestinian Arab children get an education inferior to that of Jewish children, and their relatively poor performance in school reflects this." In 1999, in an attempt to close the gap between Arab and Jewish education sectors, the Education Minister of Israel announced an affirmative action policy which promised that Arabs would be granted 25% of the education budget, proportionally more funding than their 18% of the population, and supported the creation of an Arab academic college.

A 2009 study from the Hebrew University School of Education demonstrated that the Israeli Education Ministry's budget for special assistance to students from low socioeconomic backgrounds "severely" discriminated against Arabs. The study found that because there were more needy Arab students, but fewer Arab students overall, educationally needy Jewish students receive anywhere from 3.8 to 6.9 times as much funding as equally needy Arab students. The Education Ministry said in response to the report that a decision has already been made to abandon this allocation method. The Follow-Up Committee for Arab Education notes that the Israeli government spends an average of $192 per year on each Arab student compared to $1,100 per Jewish student. The drop-out rate for Arab citizens of Israel is twice as high as that of their Jewish counterparts (12 percent versus 6 percent). The same group also notes that there is a 5,000-classroom shortage in the Arab sector.

A 2007 report of the UN Committee on the Elimination of Racial Discrimination noted that separate sectors are maintained for Jewish and Arab education. It recommended that Israel should assess the extent to which maintenance of separate Arab and Jewish sectors "may amount to racial segregation", and that mixed Arab-Jewish communities and schools, and intercultural education should be promoted. In a 2008 report, Israel responded that parents are entitled to enroll their children in the educational institution of their choice, whether the spoken language is Hebrew, Arabic or bilingual. It also noted that Israel promotes a variety of programs that promote intercultural cooperation, tolerance and understanding

In Palestine in Israeli School Books: Ideology and Propaganda in Education, Nurit Peled-Elhanan, a professor of language and education at the Hebrew University of Jerusalem, describes the depiction of Arabs in Israeli schoolbooks as racist. She states that their only representation is as ‘refugees, primitive farmers and terrorists’, claiming that in "hundreds and hundreds" of books, not one photograph depicted an Arab as a "normal person". Arnon Groiss of the Center for Monitoring the Impact of Peace criticized these findings. After reviewing the same books examined by Peled-Ehanan, Groiss concluded that "Peled-Ehanan's claim regarding this point is clearly false ... This heavily politicized and thus biased approach distorts the material to produce a picture to her liking." Groiss further criticized the work of Peled-Elhanan for stretching the definition of racism to include cases that researchers would normally categorize as ethnocentrism.

==== Land ownership ====
The Jewish National Fund is a private organization established in 1901 to buy and develop land in the Land of Israel for Jewish settlement; land purchases were funded by donations from world Jewry exclusively for that purpose.

Discrimination has been claimed regarding ownership and leasing of land in Israel, because approximately 13% of Israel's land, owned by the Jewish National Fund, is restricted to Jewish ownership and tenancy, and Arabs are prevented from buying or leasing that land.

In the early 2000s, several Community settlement in the Negev and the Galilee were accused of barring Arab applicants from moving in. In 2010, the Knesset passed legislation that allowed admissions committees to function in smaller communities in the Galilee and the Negev, while explicitly forbidding committees to bar applicants based on the basis of race, religion, sex, ethnicity, disability, personal status, age, parenthood, sexual orientation, country of origin, political views, or political affiliation. Critics, however, say the law gives the privately run admissions committees a wide latitude over public lands, and believe it will worsen discrimination against the Arab minority.

==== Zionism ====
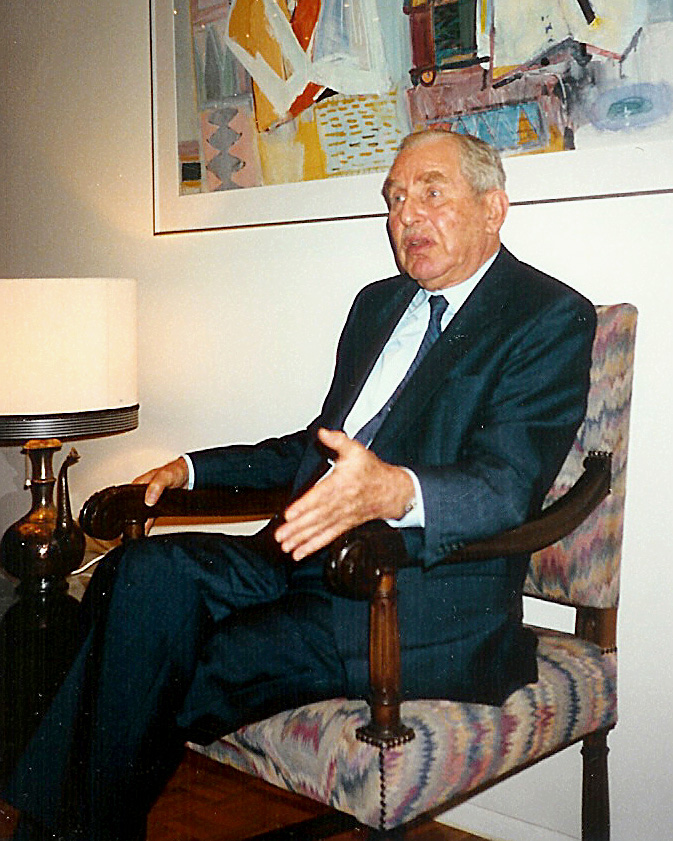
Chaim Herzog condemned the Zionism is racism UN resolution, saying that Zionism is non-discriminatory and non racist. The resolution was later revoked.

Some critics of Israel equate Zionism with racism, or describe Zionism itself as racist or discriminatory. In 1975, the United Nations General Assembly passed Resolution 3379, which concluded that "Zionism is a form of racism and racial discrimination". During debate on the resolution, U.S. ambassador Daniel Patrick Moynihan argued that Zionism "clearly is not a form of racism", defining racism as "an ideology ... which favors discrimination on the grounds of alleged biological differences".

Edward Said, in his 1979 essay "Zionism from the Standpoint of Its Victims", wrote:

Zionism has hidden, or caused to disappear, the literal historical ground of its growth, its political cost to the native inhabitants of Palestine, and its militantly oppressive discriminations between Jews and non-Jews... Today the one issue that electrifies Israel as a society is the problem of the Palestinians, whose negation is the most consistent thread running through Zionism."

The resolution was revoked by Resolution 46/86 on 16 December 1991. Speaking to the General Assembly, George H. W. Bush said "to equate Zionism with the intolerable sin of racism is to twist history and forget the terrible plight of Jews in World War II and indeed throughout history".

Supporters of Zionism, such as Chaim Herzog, argue that the movement is non-discriminatory and contains no racist aspects.

===== Law of return controversy =====
Some critics have described the Law of Return, which allows all Jews and persons of some Jewish descent to immigrate to Israel as racist, as Palestinian refugees are not eligible for citizenship. Palestinians and advocates for Palestinian refugee rights criticize the Law of Return, which they compare to the Palestinian claim to a right of return. These critics consider the Law, as contrasted against the denial of the right of Palestinian refugees to return, as offensive and as institutionalized ethnic discrimination.

Supporters of the Law argue that it is consistent with the Convention on the Elimination of All Forms of Racial Discrimination Article I(3) which allows for preferential treatments of some groups for purpose of immigration, provided there is no discrimination against a specific nationality.

In addition, proponents of the law point out that in addition to Israel, several other countries provide immigration privileges to individuals with ethnic ties to these countries. Examples include Germany, Serbia, Greece, Japan, Turkey, Ireland, Russia, Italy, Spain, Chile, Poland and Finland (See Right of return and Repatriation laws.) Some supporters noted that the decision by the Venice Commission recognized the relationship between ethnic minorities and their kin-states as legitimate and even desirable, and preference in immigration and naturalization is mentioned as an example of legitimate preference.

In response to Arab criticism of Israel's Law of Return as discriminatory in a 1975 United Nations resolution debate, Israelis argued that Palestinian Israelis were not subject to any legal discrimination.

===== Proposed oath of allegiance =====
In 2010, the Israeli cabinet proposed an amendment to the Citizenship Act requiring all future non-Jews applying for Israeli citizenship to swear loyalty to Israel as a Jewish and democratic state. The proposal met harsh criticism, including accusations of racism, and subsequently it was amended to make the loyalty oath universal to both Jewish and non-Jewish naturalized citizens. Even in this new form, the bill did not pass due to lack of majority support in the Israeli parliament.

==== Marriage ====
Israel's Citizenship and Entry into Israel Law bars immigration by family reunification to couples of an Israeli citizen and a Palestinian resident of the Israeli-occupied territories. Amnesty International says this mostly affects Arabs. The law has been condemned by Amnesty International as "racial discrimination". The government says the law say it is aimed at preventing terrorist attacks. Some leaders of the Kadima party support the law in order to preserve the state's Jewish character. Mishael Cheshin, one of the supreme court judges who upheld the law, wrote that "at a time of war the state could prevent the entry of enemy subjects to its territory even if they were married to citizens of the state".

==== Religious racism ====
Rabbi David Batzri and his son Yitzhak were investigated by police after they made racist remarks against Arabs and protested against a mixed Arab-Jewish school in Jerusalem. As part of a 2008 plea bargain, Yitzhak was sentenced to community service, and David issued a declaration saying he was opposed to any racist incitement and said that he calls for love, brotherhood and friendship.

Dov Lior, Chief Rabbi of Hebron and Kiryat Arba in the southern West Bank and head of the "Council of Rabbis of Judea and Samaria" issued a religious edict saying "a thousand non-Jewish lives are not worth a Jew's fingernail" and stated that captured Arab terrorists could be used to conduct medical experiments, and also ruled that Jewish Law forbids employing Arabs or renting homes to them. Lior denied holding racist views. In June 2011, the Rabbi was arrested by Israeli police and questioned on suspicion of inciting violence. Both opposition leader Tzipi Livni and Prime Minister Benjamin Netanyahu called for a full judicial investigation of Lior's remarks and said that rabbis were not above the law.

In October 2010, Ovadia Yosef, a former Sephardi chief rabbi, stated that the sole purpose of non-Jews "is to serve Jews". His statement was harshly condemned by several Jewish organizations.

On 7 Dec 2010, a group of 50 state-paid rabbis signed a letter instructing Orthodox Jews not to rent or sell houses to non-Jews. The letter was later endorsed by some 250 other Jewish religious figures. A hotline was opened for denouncing those Jews who did intend to rent out to Arabs.

On 19 Dec 2010, a rally attended by 200 people was held in Bat Yam against the "assimilation" of young Jewish women with Arabs. One of the organizers, "Bentzi" Ben-Zion Gopstein, said that the motives are not racist: "It is important to explain that the problem is religious, not racist. If my son were to decide to marry an Arab woman who converted, I wouldn't have a problem with that. My problem is the assimilation that the phenomenon causes." One of the protestors called out, "Any Jewish woman who goes with an Arab should be killed; any Jew who sells his home to an Arab should be killed." Bat Yam Mayor Shlomo Lahyani condemned the event, saying "The city of Bat Yam denounces any racist phenomenon. This is a democratic country,". Nearby, about 200 residents of Bat Yam held a counter protest, waving signs reading, "We're fed up with racists" and "Jews and Arabs refuse to be enemies". Later that month, the wives of 27 rabbis signed a letter calling on Jewish girls to stay away from Arab men. The document stated: "Don't date them, don't work where they work and don't perform National Service with them."

A senior Catholic spokesman, Father Pierbattista Pizzaballa, the Custodian of the Holy Land, has claimed that a lack of police action, and an educational culture in which Jewish pupils are encouraged to act with "contempt" towards Christians, has resulted in life becoming increasingly "intolerable" for many Christians. In 2012, pro-settler extremists attacked a Trappist monastery in the town of Latroun covering walls with anti-Christian graffiti denouncing Christ as a "monkey", and the 11th century Monastery of the Cross was daubed with offensive slogans such as "Death to Christians". According to an article in The Daily Telegraph, Christian leaders feel that the most important issue that Israel has failed to address is the practice of some ultra-Orthodox Jewish schools to teach children that it is a religious obligation to abuse anyone in Holy Orders they encounter in public, "such that Ultra-Orthodox Jews, including children as young as eight, spit at members of the clergy on a daily basis." Incidents of spitting on Christian clergymen in Jerusalem have been common since the 1990s. Ruling on the case of a Greek Orthodox priest who had struck a yeshiva student who spat near him in 2011, a Jerusalem magistrate wrote, "Day after day, clergymen endure spitting by members of those fringe groups — a phenomenon intended to treat other religions with contempt. ... The authorities are not able to eradicate this phenomenon and they don't catch the spitters, even though this phenomenon has been going on for years."

==== Incidents ====
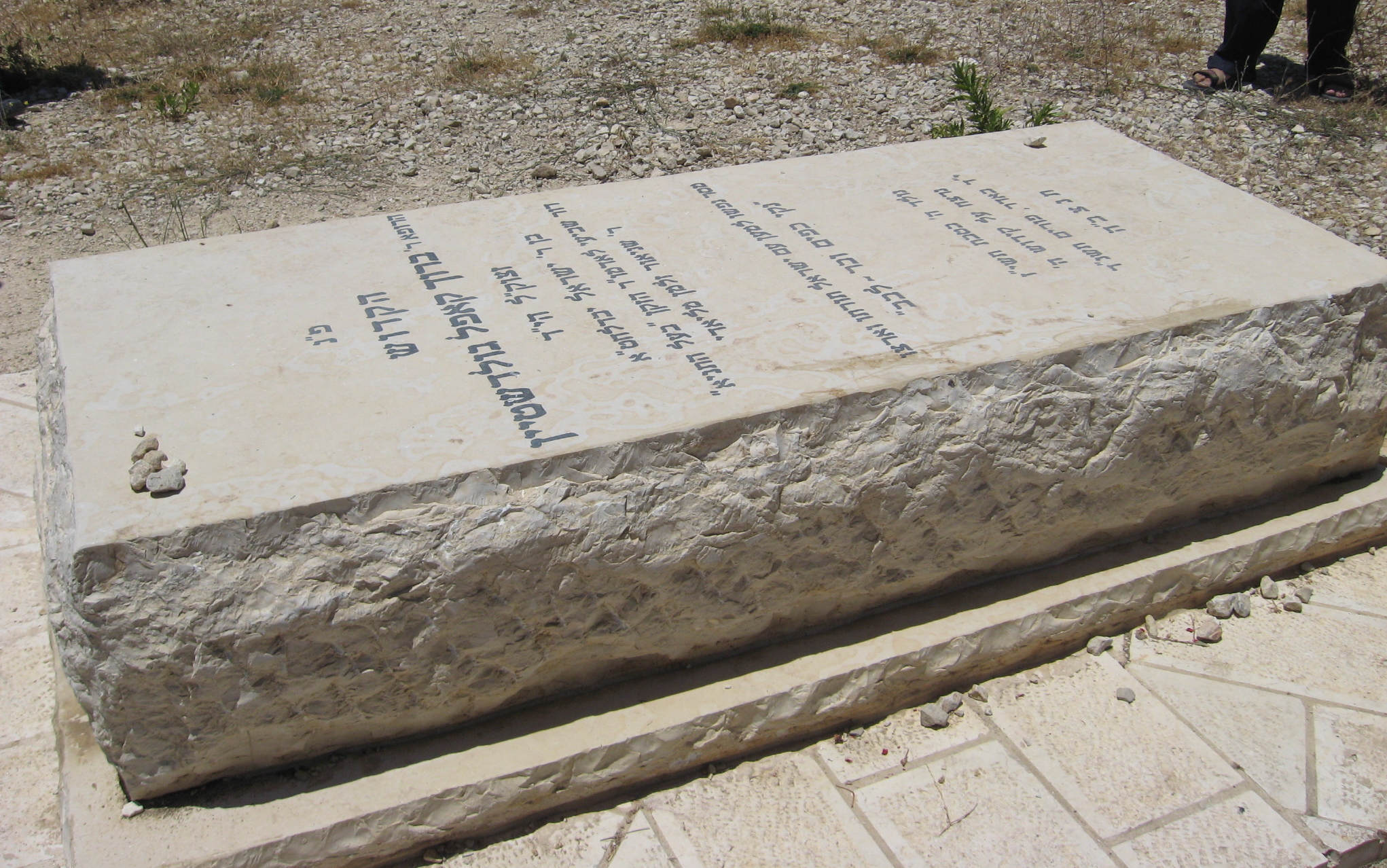
Baruch Goldstein's tomb. The plaque reads "To the holy Baruch Goldstein, who gave his life for the Jewish people, the Torah and the nation of Israel."

In 1994, a Jewish settler in the West Bank and follower of the Kach party, Baruch Goldstein, massacred 29 Palestinian Muslim worshipers at the Cave of the Patriarchs in Hebron. During his funeral, a rabbi declared that even one million Arabs are "not worth a Jewish fingernail". Goldstein was denounced by most religious streams including the mainstream Orthodox", and many in Israel classified Goldstein as insane. The Israeli government condemned the massacre and made Kach illegal. The Israeli army killed a further nine Palestinians during riots following the massacre, and the Israeli government severely restricted Palestinian freedom of movement in Hebron, while letting settlers roam free. Although Israel also forbade a very small number (18) of Israeli settlers from entering Palestinian towns and demanded that those settlers turn in their army-issued rifles, it denied the PLO's request that all settlers be disarmed and that an international force be established to protect Palestinians from Israeli aggressors. Goldstein's grave has become a pilgrimage site for Jewish extremists. Current Israeli Minister of National Security Itamar Ben-Gvir is known to have had a portrait of Goldstein hanging in his living room as homage.

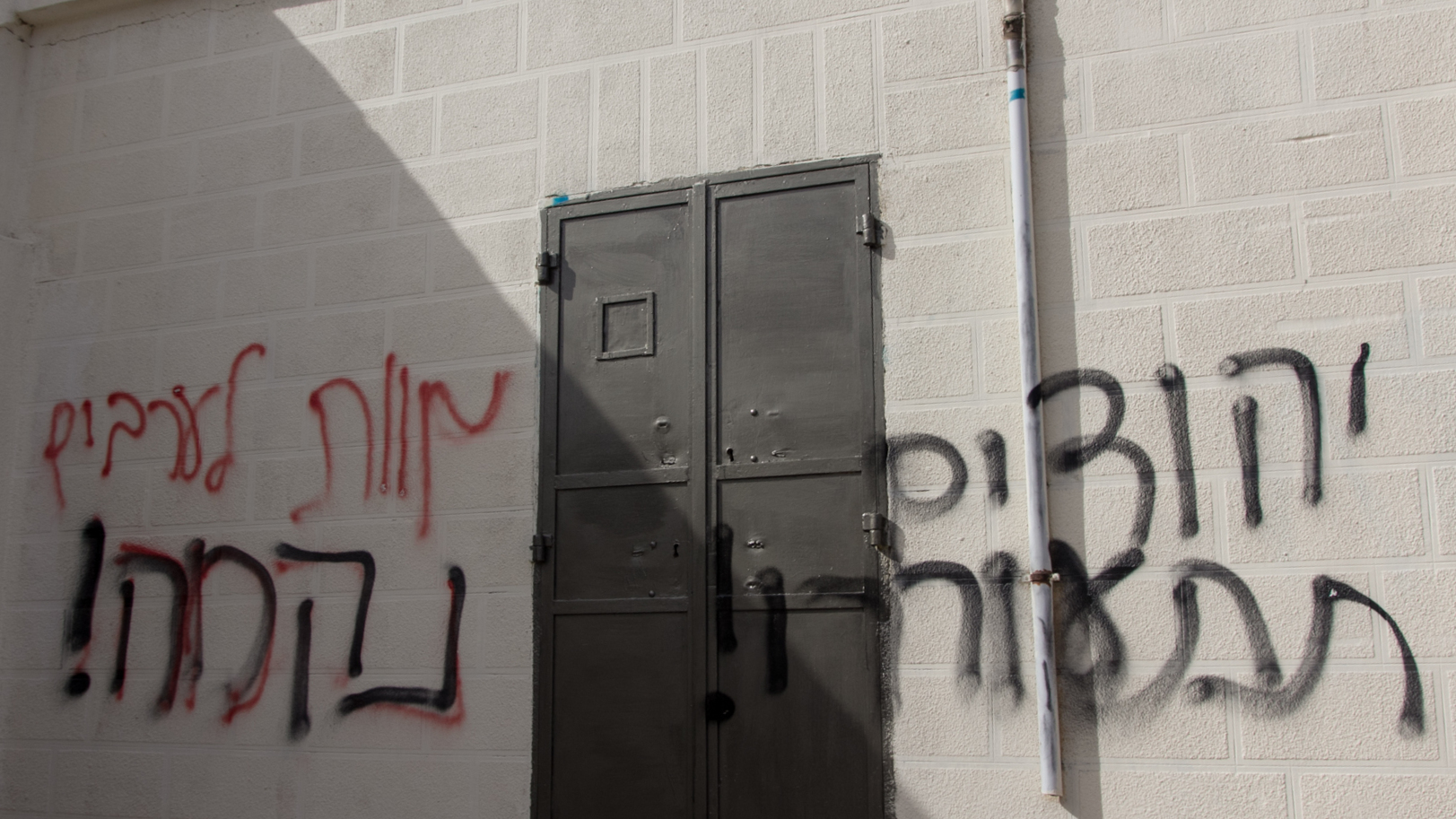
Price tag graffiti in Hebrew reading "Jews Wake up!", "Death to Arabs", and "Revenge!" on a Palestinian home in the West Bank, 2014

In 2006, a stabbing incident took place when a gang of Russian immigrants chanting racist slogans stabbed and lightly injured Arab Knesset member Abbas Zakour, which was part of a "stabbing rampage" and was described as a "hate crime".

The Mossawa Advocacy Center for Arab Citizens in Israel reported a tenfold increase in racist incidents against Arabs in 2008. Jerusalem reported the highest number of racist incidents against Arabs. The report blamed Israeli leaders for the violence, saying "These attacks are not the hand of fate, but a direct result of incitement against the Arab citizens of this country by religious, public, and elected officials." The Bedouin claim they face systemic discrimination and have submitted a counter-report to the United Nations that disputes the Israeli government's official state report. They claim they are not treated as equal citizens in Israel and that Bedouin towns are not provided the same level of services or land that Jewish towns of the same size are, and that they are not given fair access to water. The city of Beersheba refused to recognize a Bedouin holy site, despite a High Court recommendation.

In late 2010, the number of racist incidents against Arabs increased. The events were described by the Defense Minister of Israel, Ehud Barak, as a "wave of racism". The most notable ones took place on 20 December 2010, when a group of five Arabs were driven from an apartment in Tel Aviv after their landlady was threatened with the torching of her home if she continued to rent out to Arabs, and on 21 December 2010, when a gang of Jewish youths was arrested in Jerusalem after carrying out a large number of attacks on Arabs. A girl aged 14 would lure Arab men to the Independence Park, where they were attacked with stones and bottles and severely beaten. The teens confessed to nationalistic motives. On 31 Oct 2010, a Jewish mob gathered outside of an Arab students' residence in Safed, chanted "death to the Arabs", hurled rocks and bottles at the building, shattering glass, and fired a shot at the building before dissassembling.

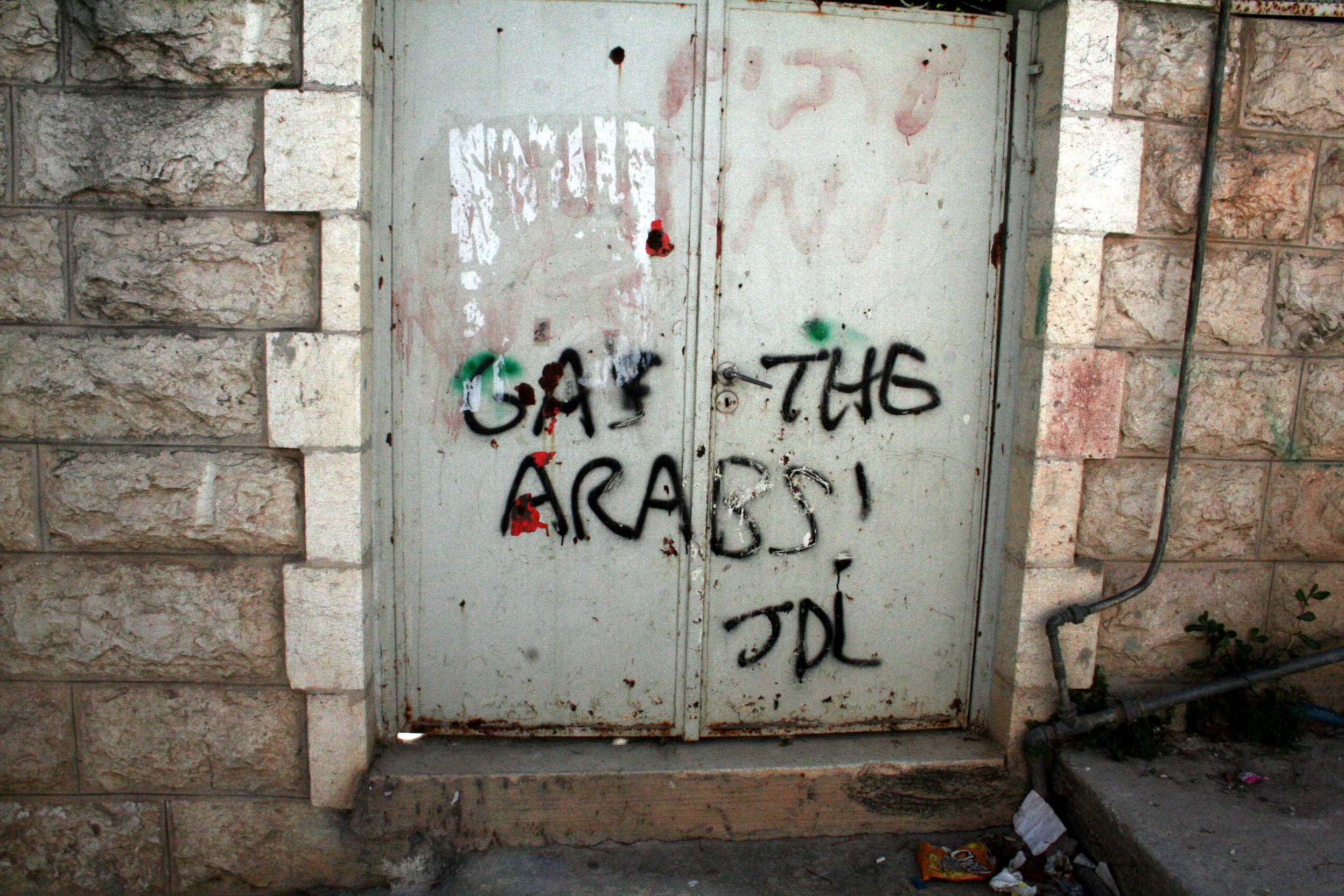
Graffiti in Hebron, in the Israeli-occupied West Bank, calling for the gassing of Arabs, above a tag for the right-wing group the Jewish Defense League

In May 2011, two Israeli border patrolmen were charged with physical abuse against an Arab minor who was carrying firecrackers. The incident took place in March 2010. The youth was punched, knocked to the floor, kicked, and had death threats thrown against him by the officers. At a police station, the 17-year-old male was tricked by a female police officer into believing he was going to die. After making the prisoner go down on his knees, she allegedly pointed her pistol at him at point-blank range. It was not loaded, but the minor did not know this because his eyes were covered. According to the charges, she counted to 10, with the teen begging her not to kill him. She allegedly pulled the trigger, saying "Death to Arabs". She was later sentenced to 3 months in prison.

In March 2012, two Arab males of Beit Zarzir confessed, after being arrested, to damaging a local school for Arab and Jewish students. They admitted responsibility for having sprayed on the wall of the school, "Death to Arabs". The school was sprayed twice in February with the slogans "price tag", "Death to Arabs", and "Holocaust to the Arabs".

On 18 November 2013, Jewish settlers torched trucks and spray-painted walls in a Palestinian village. Two perpetrators, Yehuda Landsberg and Yehuda Sabir, admitted their guilt and received the minimum sentence. Binyamin Richter, a third defendant, claimed innocence. They are from Havat Gilad. This was the first time that any indictments were issued against the 52 Jewish Israelis who had committed anti-Arab attacks that were completely unprovoked, which the Israeli security forces differentiate from "price tag" attacks.

After the murder of 3 Israeli teenagers were found on 30 June 2014, a Facebook Page created by an unknown group of Israelis called "The People of Israel Demand Vengeance!" or "The people of Israel demand revenge!" The page features a myriad of photos of people holding up signs demanding revenge for the killing of the teens, and urging Prime Minister Benjamin Netanyahu to order widespread military action in the West Bank and Gaza. Further racist incitement within the Facebook campaign depicted a photograph that was posted to the page with two teenage girls smiling, hugging each other and holding a piece of paper saying, "Hating Arabs is not racism, it's values." Another post showed an armed IDF soldier with "Revenge!" in Hebrew inscribed on his chest. The Facebook Campaign received more than 30,000 likes by the evening of 3 July 2014. The campaign has been condemned by a number of Israeli MK's including Justice Minister Tzipi Livni and Minister of Agriculture and Yisrael Beiteinu MK Yair Shamir. The Israeli Defense Forces also vowed to severely punish any soldier involved with the exchange of racist photographs depicting revenge for the murdered teens or retributive incitement of Anti-Arabism across Facebook and other social media sites.

Also in November 2014, a Druze soldier, veteran of Operation Protective Edge, was refused entry to a pub where his Jewish friends were. A security guard told him that he was not allowed to let non-Jews enter. While the owner claimed it was a private club, the Jewish patron denied this claim, noting they were allowed to enter without membership. A friend of the Druse IDF soldier said "Apparently, they are good enough to fight in Gaza but not to enter a pub."

On 21 November 2014, during a Tel Aviv soccer match, hundreds of Bnei Yehuda fans rose and chanted, "Death to Arabs!" The fans threw trash at an Arab player who was injured and was being taken off the field.

On 29 November 2014, an apparent hate crime including arson and racist graffiti was perpetrated in Jerusalem on a dual Hebrew and Arabic language school. Graffiti spray painted at the school included, "Death to Arabs!", "Kahane was right!", "Down with assimilation!" and "There is no co-existence with cancer!" Police say the fire was set on purpose. Education Minister Shai Piron spoke out against the vandalism, saying it represented a "violent, criminal and despicable act done to undermine the foundations of Israeli democracy." Mohamad Marzouk, head of communications for the Hand in Hand school in Kfar Qara, noted that the attack brought out a show of community support for the school. In the minds of many people the arson, he said, "crossed a red line." The Israeli police arrested a number of suspects in connection with this arson attack. Following the arrest, the mother of one of the suspects said she would have burned the school as well, if it were not illegal to do so, and she expressed disgust and revulsion that Jews and Arabs studied together at the school. In courtroom photos the three members of the radical group are shown smiling and smirking as they faced charges. On 30 November, a synagogue in Tel Aviv had several books burned and was vandalized with graffiti against the Jewish nation-state bill, which most recently, had been submitted the previous week.

The Times of Israel reported on 1 January 2015 that three Jewish men who had admitted to committing racist hate crimes against an Arab taxi driver in early 2014 were each sentenced to approximately one year in prison. The criminals admitted they had hailed the cab, then began beating and insulting the cab driver. When the driver escaped the car and ran for help, the perpetrators smashed the taxi sunroof.

==== Racism in sports ====
Racism in soccer stadiums is a worldwide problem, and Israeli stadiums are not free from racism. The first racist incidents took place in the 1970s, when the Arab player Rifaat Turk joined Hapoel Tel Aviv. Turk was subjected to anti-Arab abuse during nearly every game he played. Arab soccer player Abbas Suan was confronted once with a sign reading "Abbas Suan, you don't represent us". Under Israeli law, soccer fans can be prosecuted for incitement of racial hatred. The "New Voices from the Stadium" program, run by the New Israel Fund (NIF) amasses a "racism index" that is reported to the media on a weekly basis, and teams have been fined and punished for the conduct of their fans. According to Steve Rothman, the NIF San Francisco director, "Things have definitely improved, particularly in sensitizing people to the existence of racism in Israeli society." In 2006, Israel joined Football Against Racism in Europe (FARE), network set up to counter racism in soccer.

After a soccer game in March 2012, in which Beitar Jerusalem defeated a rival team at Jerusalem's Teddy Stadium, a group of at least a hundred Beitar fans entered the nearby Malha Mall chanting racist slogans and allegedly attacked Arab cleaning workers, whom some reports described as Palestinians. The police were criticized for initially failing to make arrests; it later investigated the incident, issuing restraining orders against 20 soccer fans and questioning several suspects among the cleaning crew seen waving sticks at the fans.

==== Bomb shelters ====
During the Twelve-Day War in June 2025, Israeli Arab citizens, foreign non-Jewish residents and migrant workers have publicly shared distressing accounts of them being barred from entering into bomb shelters.

=== Intra-Jewish racism ===
Ashkenazi Jews in Israel have been described as viewing themselves as superior to non-Ashkenazi Jews. They are accused of maintaining an elite position in Israeli society, with some describing the attitudes of Ashkenazim as racist or of being a manifestation of racism.

Other authorities describe the discrimination by Ashkenazi as class-based, not race-based. For example, the differences between Sephardic and Mizrahi Jews (N. Africans, Middle Easterners, Yemenites, etc.) are referred to as Adatiyut community-differences (resulting also in some traditional customary gaps).

Some sources claim that reports of intra-Jewish discrimination in Israel arise from propaganda published by Arab sources which ignores the normality and harmony between the communities.

==== Sephardim and Mizrahim (Middle Eastern and North African Jews) ====
Israeli society in general – and Ashkenazi Jews in particular – have been described as holding discriminatory attitudes towards Jews of Middle Eastern and North African descent, known as Mizrahi Jews, Sephardic Jews, and Oriental Jews.

The 20,000 Moroccan Jews who had migrated to Israel in 1948-49 faced significant racism from Ashkenazi Jews and there was a demonstrated desire among the former to leave Israel and return to Morocco, particularly among the several hundred who had served in the Israeli military during the 1948 war.

Writing in Haaretz, journalist Arye Gelblum characterized Moroccan Jews as inferior and an existential threat to nascent Israel: "This is immigration of a race we have not yet known in the country ... We are dealing with people whose primitivism is at a peak, whose level of knowledge is one of virtually absolute ignorance... Generally, they are only slightly better than the general level of the Arabs, Negroes, and Berbers in the same regions... These Jews also lack roots in Judaism, as they are totally subordinated to the play of savage and primitive instincts ... Chronic laziness and hatred for work, there is nothing safe about this asocial element."

A variety of Mizrahi critics of Israeli policy have cited "past ill-treatment, including the maabarot, the squalid tent cities into which Mizrahim were placed upon arrival in Israel; the humiliation of Moroccan and other Mizrahi Jews when Israeli immigration authorities shaved their heads and sprayed their bodies with the pesticide DDT; the socialist elite's enforced secularization; the destruction of traditional family structure, and the reduced status of the patriarch by years of poverty and sporadic unemployment" as examples of mistreatment. In September 1997, Israeli Labor Party leader Ehud Barak made a high-profile apology to Oriental Jews in Netivot stating:

We must admit to ourselves [that] the inner fabric of communal life was torn. Indeed, sometimes the intimate fabric of family life was torn. Much suffering was inflicted on the immigrants and that suffering was etched in their hearts, as well as in the hearts of their children and grandchildren. There was no malice on the part of those bringing the immigrants here—on the contrary, there was much goodwill—but pain was inflicted nevertheless. In acknowledgement of this suffering and pain, and out of identification with the sufferers and their descendants, I hereby ask forgiveness in my own name and in the name of the historical Labor movement.

Barak's address also said that during the 1950s, Mizrahi immigrants were "made to feel that their own traditions were inferior to those of the dominant Ashkenazi [European-origin] Israelis [Alex Weingrod's paraphrase]". Several prominent Labor party figures, including Teddy Kollek and Shimon Peres, distanced themselves from the apology while agreeing that mistakes were made during the immigration period.

The cultural differences between Mizrahi and Ashkenazi Jews impacted the degree and rate of assimilation into Israeli society, and sometimes the divide between Eastern European and Middle Eastern Jews was quite sharp. Segregation, especially in the area of housing, limited integration possibilities over the years. Intermarriage between Ashkenazim and Mizrahim is increasingly common in Israel, and by the late 1990s 28% of all Israeli children had multi-ethnic parents (up from 14% in the 1950s). A 1983 research found that children of inter-ethnic marriages in Israel enjoyed improved socio-economic status.

Although social integration is constantly improving, disparities persist. A study conducted by the Israeli Central Bureau of Statistics (ICBS), Mizrahi Jews are less likely to pursue academic studies than Ashkenazi Jews. Israeli-born Ashkenazi are up to twice more likely to study in a university than Israeli-born Mizrahim. Furthermore, the percentage of Mizrahim who seek a university education remains low compared to second-generation immigrant groups of Ashkenazi origin, such as Russians. According to a survey by the Adva Center, the average income of Ashkenazim was 36 percent higher than that of Mizrahim in 2004.

Some claim that the education system discriminates against Jewish minorities from North Africa and the Middle East, and one source suggests that "ethnic prejudice against Mizrahi Jews is a relatively general phenomenon, not limited to the schooling process".

There was a case in 2010, when a Haredi school system, where Sephardi and Mizrahi students were sometimes excluded or segregated. In 2010, the Israeli supreme court sent a strong message against discrimination in a case involving the Slonim Hassidic sect of the Ashkenazi, ruling that segregation between Ashkenazi and Sephardi students in a school is illegal. They argue that they seek "to maintain an equal level of religiosity, not from racism". Responding to the charges, the Slonim Haredim invited Sephardi girls to school, and added in a statement: "All along, we said it's not about race, but the High Court went out against our rabbis, and therefore we went to prison."

In 2023, journalist Shany Littman believes that the dynamics of inequality have reversed, with most Mizrahi Jews being cabinet ministers and mayors and middle-class Mizrahi women earning more than their Ashkenazi counterparts.

===== Teimani children (Yemenite Jews) =====
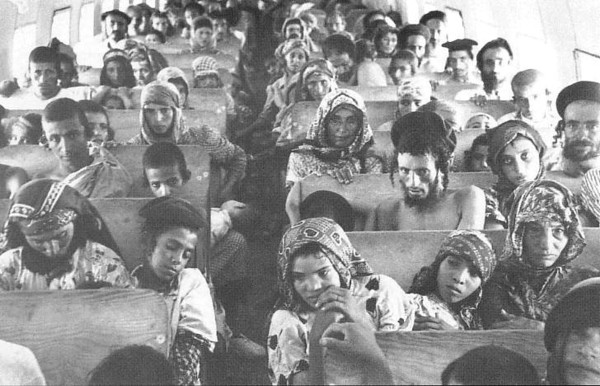
Yemenite Jews en route from Aden to Israel, during Operation Magic Carpet

In the 1950s, 1,033 children of Yemenite immigrant families disappeared. In most instances, the parents claim that they were told their children were ill and required hospitalization. Upon later visiting the hospital, it is claimed that the parents were told that their children had died though no bodies were presented or graves which have later proven to be empty in many cases were shown to the parents. Those who believe the theory contend that the Israeli government as well as other organizations in Israel kidnapped the children and gave them for adoption. Secular Israeli Jews of European descent were accused of collaborating in the disappearance of babies of Yemeni Jews and anti-religious motives and anti-religious coercion were alleged. Some went further to accuse the Israeli authorities of conspiring to kidnap the Yemeni children due to "racist" motives.

In 2001 a seven-year public inquiry commission concluded that the accusations that Yemenite children were kidnapped are not true. The commission has unequivocally rejected claims of a plot to take children away from Yemenite immigrants. The report determined that documentation exists for 972 of the 1,033 missing children. Five additional missing babies were found to be alive. The commission was unable to discover what happened in another 56 cases. With regard to these unresolved 56 cases, the commission deemed it "possible" that the children were handed over for adoption following decisions made by individual local social workers, but not as part of an official policy.

==== Bene Israel (Indian Jews) ====
In 1962, authorities in Israel were accused by articles in the Indian press of racism in relation to Jews of Indian ancestry (called Bene Israel). In the case that caused the controversy, the Chief Rabbi of Israel ruled that before registering a marriage between Indian Jews and Jews not belonging to that community, the registering rabbi should investigate the lineage of the Indian applicant for possible non-Jewish descent, and in case of doubt, require the applicant to perform conversion or immersion. The alleged discrimination may actually be related to the fact that some religious authorities believe that the Bene Israel are not fully Jewish because of inter-marriage during their long separation.

In 1964 the government of Israel led by Levi Eshkol declared that it regards Bene Israel of India as Jews without exception, who are equal to other Jews in respect of all matters.

==== Beta Israel (Ethiopian Jews) ====
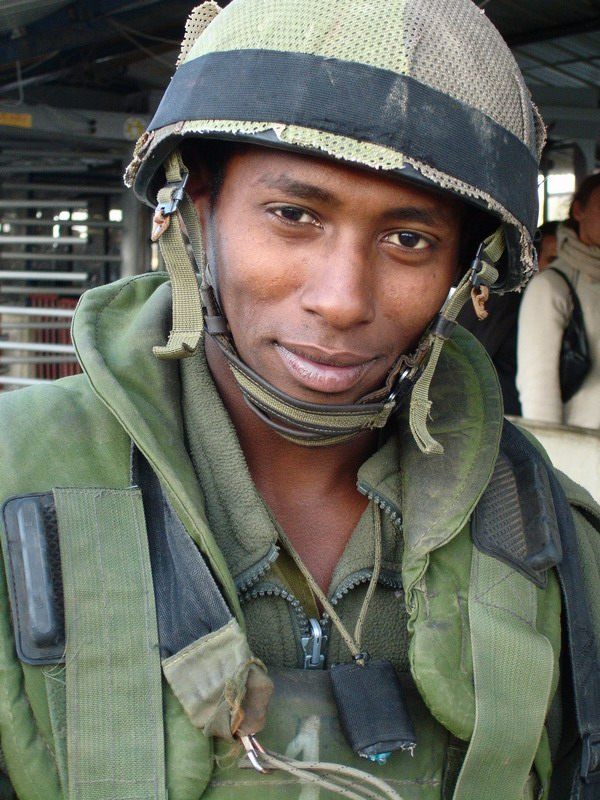
Ethiopian Israeli soldier

Nearly all of the Ethiopian Beta Israel community, a community of Black Jews, resides in Israel. The Israeli government has mounted rescue operations, most notably during Operation Moses (1984) and Operation Solomon (1991), for their migration when civil war and famine threatened populations within Ethiopia. Today 81,000 Israelis were born in Ethiopia, while 38,500 or 32% of the community are native born Israelis.

According to the sociologist Prof. Uzi Rebhun, it represents an ambitious attempt to deny the significance of race. Israeli authorities, aware of the situation of most African diaspora communities in other Western countries, hosted programs to avoid setting in patterns of discrimination. The Ethiopian Jewish community's internal challenges have been complicated by racist attitudes on the part of some elements of Israeli society and the official establishment. Racism has commonly been cited as explanation for policies and programs that failed to meet expectations. Racism was alleged regarding delays in admitting Ethiopian Jews to Israel under the Law of Return. The delays in admitting Ethiopians may be attributed to religious motivations rather than racism, since there was debate whether or not Falasha Jews' (Beta Israel) were Jewish.

Racism was also alleged in 2009, in a case where school children of Ethiopian ancestry were denied admission into three semi-private religious schools in the town of Petah Tikva. An Israeli government official criticised the Petah Tikva Municipality and the semi-private Haredi schools, saying "This concerns not only the three schools that have, for a long time, been deceiving the entire educational system. For years, racism has developed here undeterred". Shas spiritual leader Ovadia Yosef threatened to fire any school principal from Shas's school system who refused to receive Ethiopian students. The Israeli Education Ministry decided to pull the funding from the Lamerhav, Da'at Mevinim and Darkhei Noam schools, the three semi-private institutions that refused to accept the students. Israeli Prime Minister Benjamin Netanyahu spoke out against the rejection of Ethiopian children, calling it "a moral terror attack."

When Ethiopians protested that blood donations from their community were thrown out, Harry Wall, the Israeli Director of the Anti-Defamation League stated that it was the result of the high incidence of HIV in Africans, not racism: "Whatever Israel's mistakes towards its Ethiopian Jewish community, the cause is not racism." It explains that "what causes the distress is bureaucratic ineptitude and a cultural gap between a traditional community and a modern, technologically-advanced, highly-competitive nation."

In 2012, Israel appointed the country's first Ethiopian-born ambassador, Belaynesh Zevadia. According to the foreign minister of Israel, this represented an important milestone in fighting racism and prejudice.

===== Depo Provera prescription controversy =====
In 2010, Israel was accused of a "sterilization policy" aimed towards Ethiopian Jews, for allowing the prescription of contraceptive drugs like Depo-Provera to the community. They stated that the Israeli government deliberately gives female Ethiopian Jews long-lasting contraceptive drugs like Depo-Provera. Jewish agencies involved in immigration said that Ethiopian women were offered different types of contraceptives and that "all of them participated voluntarily in family planning". Dr. Yifat Bitton, a member of the Israeli Anti-Discrimination Legal Center "Tmura" said that 60 percent of the women receiving this contraceptive are Ethiopian Jews, while Ethiopians made up only 1 percent of population and "the gap here is just impossible to reconcile in any logical manner that would somehow resist the claims of racism". Professor Zvi Bentwich, an immunologist and human rights activist from Tel-Aviv, rejected the claim and said there's no ground to suspect a negative official policy towards Ethiopian Jews.

Israel initially denied the claim of injecting Ethiopian women with Depo-Provera without their informed consent, but later issued an order for gynecologists to stop administering the drugs for women of Ethiopian origin if there is concern that they might not understand the ramifications of the treatment. Action on the issue finally took place after a documentary aired in December 2012 on public television. In it, 35 Ethiopian women who had immigrated to Israel said they had been told they would not be allowed into Israel unless they agreed to the shots. While Ethiopians have been admitted to Israel, they are often discriminated against in education and in employment. The Times of Israel notes details of a nurse, unaware of a hidden camera, saying Depo-Provera is given to Ethiopian women because "they forget, they don't understand, and it's hard to explain to them, so it's best that they receive a shot once every three months ... basically they don't understand anything."

===== Police brutality =====
In April 2015 an Ethiopian soldier in the IDF was the victim of an unprovoked and allegedly racist attack by an Israeli policeman and the attack was caught on video. The soldier, Damas Pakedeh, was arrested and accused of attacking the policeman. He believes the incident was racially motivated and that if the video had not been taken, he would have been punished. Likud MK Avraham Neguise called on National Police Chief Yohanan Danino to prosecute the police officer and volunteer, saying they engaged in "a gross violation of the basic law of respecting others and their liberty by those who are supposed to protect us". The Jerusalem Post notes that in 2015 "there have been a series of reports in the Israeli press about alleged acts of police brutality against Ethiopian Israelis, with many in the community saying they are unfairly targeted and treated more harshly than other citizens". The incident of police brutality with Pakedeh and alleged brutality of officials from Israel's Administration of Border Crossings, Population and Immigration with Walla Bayach, an Israeli of Ethiopian descent, brought the Ethiopian community to protest. Hundreds of Ethiopians participated in protests the streets of Jerusalem on 20 April 2015, to decry what they view as "rampant racism" and violence in Israel directed at their community. Israel Police Commissioner Yohanan Danino met with representatives of the Israeli Ethiopian community that day following the recent violent incidents involving police officers and members of the community. When over a thousand people protested police brutality against Ethiopians and dark skinned Israelis, Prime Minister Benjamin Netanyahu announced: "I strongly condemn the beating of the Ethiopian IDF soldier, and those responsible will be held accountable." Following protests and demonstrations in Tel Aviv that resulted in violence, Netanyahu planned to meet with representatives of the Ethiopian community, including Pakedeh. Netanyahu said the meeting would include Danino and representatives of several ministries, including Immigrant Absorption. Danino already announced that the officer who beat Pakedeh had been fired.

==== Bnei Menashe (Indian Jews) ====
In March 2020, amid the COVID-19 pandemic, 28-year-old yeshiva student Am Shalem Singon was walking with his friends in Tiberias when two Israeli men reportedly called them “corona” due to their physical and ethnic features. After Am Shalem explained they were a part of the Bnei Menashe community from India, the men assaulted him. He sustained injuries to his chest and lungs that required surgery.

In 2022, 18-year-old Yoel Lhanghal, a recent immigrant to Israel from India, was fatally stabbed after a fight involving more than 20 teens broke out during a birthday party in Kiryat Shmona. Israeli police stated there was no evidence of a racial motive behind the attack. Yoel's father, Gideon, told Ynet, “Yoel is a victim of racism… the racism directed against us is because we look different. They [the perpetrators] harbored a great deal of hate because Yoel did not know Hebrew, and he looked different.”

=== Racism against Israeli Jews by Israeli Arabs ===
==== Polls ====
A 2009 PEW poll, which included 527 Israeli Arab respondents, showed that 35% of Israeli Arabs said their opinion of Jews was unfavorable, while 56% said their opinion was favorable (the figures amongst Israeli Jews on their attitude of themselves were 94% favorable; 6% unfavorable).

The 2008 Index of Arab-Jewish Relations in Israel by the Jewish-Arab Center found that 40.5% of the Arab citizens of Israel denied the Holocaust, up from 28% in 2006. This report also states that "In Arab eyes disbelief in the very happening of the Shoah is not hate of Jews (embedded in the denial of the Shoah in the West) but rather a form of protest. Arabs not believing in the event of Shoah intend to express strong objection to the portrayal of the Jews as the ultimate victim and to the underrating of the Palestinians as a victim. They deny Israel's right to exist as a Jewish state that the Shoah gives legitimacy to."

==== Incidents ====
Numerous racist attacks against Jews have taken place throughout Arab localities in the Galilee and in Arab areas of Jerusalem, including murders. Among the people killed in such attacks was Kristine Luken, an American tourist stabbed in a forest near Jerusalem after being seen wearing a Star of David necklace. In Jerusalem, Jews driving through Al-Issawiya have been subjected to ambushes by crowds, as was a repairman who had been hired by a resident. Emergency services vehicles have also been attacked while passing through the neighborhood. Jews who travel to the Mount of Olives also risk violence. Jews who enter or buy property in Arab areas face harassment, and Arabs who have sold property to Jews have been murdered. In 2010, an Israeli-Jewish security guard, Kochav Segal Halevi, was forced from his home in the Arab town of I'billin after a racist crowd gathered at his house, and he received death threats.

In 2008, the slogan "Death to the Jews" was found spray-painted in Arabic on the cargo hold of an El Al plane.

In 2010, the wall of a synagogue and a Jewish residence in the mixed Jewish-Arab Ajami neighborhood of Jaffa were spray-painted with swastikas and Palestinian flags.

In 2014, an Arab man from Shfaram, Hussein Halifa, murdered Shelly Dadon.

==== Leaders ====
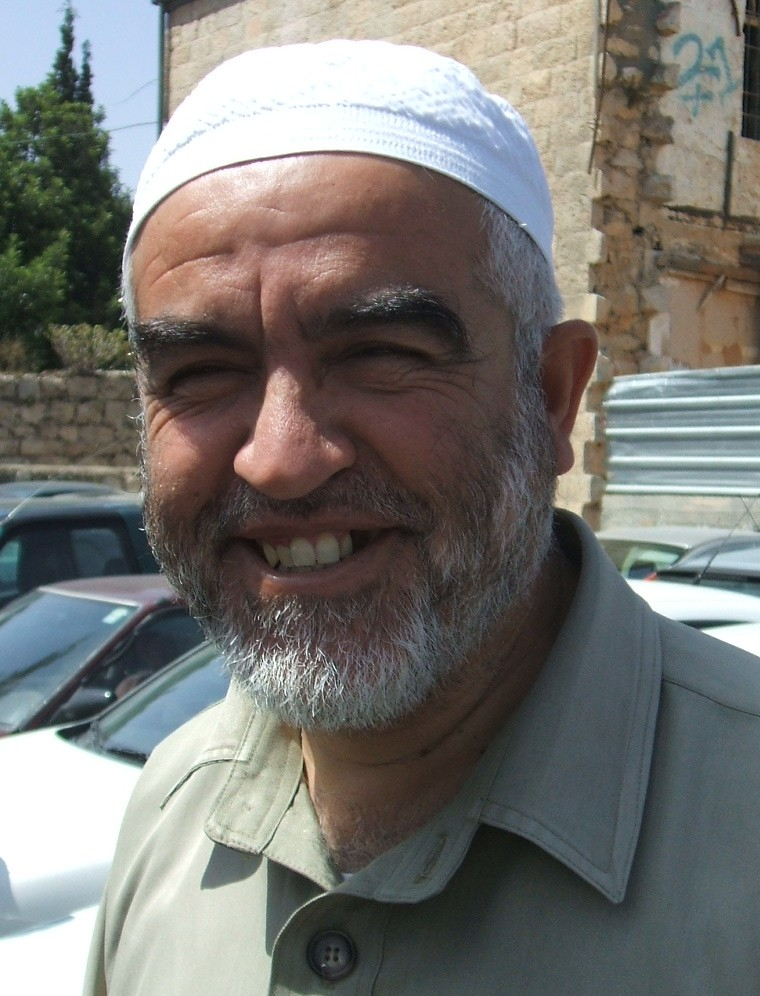
Raed Salah, the head of the Islamic movement in Israel, was prosecuted in 2010 for incitement to racism.

Journalist Ben-Meir described Arab Knesset members who "talk incessantly about the Palestinian people's rights, including their own state" but who "refuse to acknowledge Israel as the state of the Jewish people and deny the very existence of a Jewish people as a nation with national rights" as racist. Ariel Natan Pasko, a policy analyst, suggested that prominent Arab leaders such as Arab member of Knesset Ahmad Tibi is racist because he "turned away from integration" and "wants to build an Arab university in Nazareth, as well as an Arab hospital in the Galilee." Tibi had been previously accused of racism: in 1997, he said "whoever sells his house to the Jews has sold his soul to Satan and done a despicable act".

The head of the Islamic movement in Israel's Northern Branch, was charged with incitement to racism and to violence. During legal proceedings, the prosecution said that Sheikh Raed Salah made his inflammatory remarks "with the objective of inciting racism." he also accused Jews of using children's blood to bake bread.

=== Other groups ===
==== Black Hebrew Israelites ====
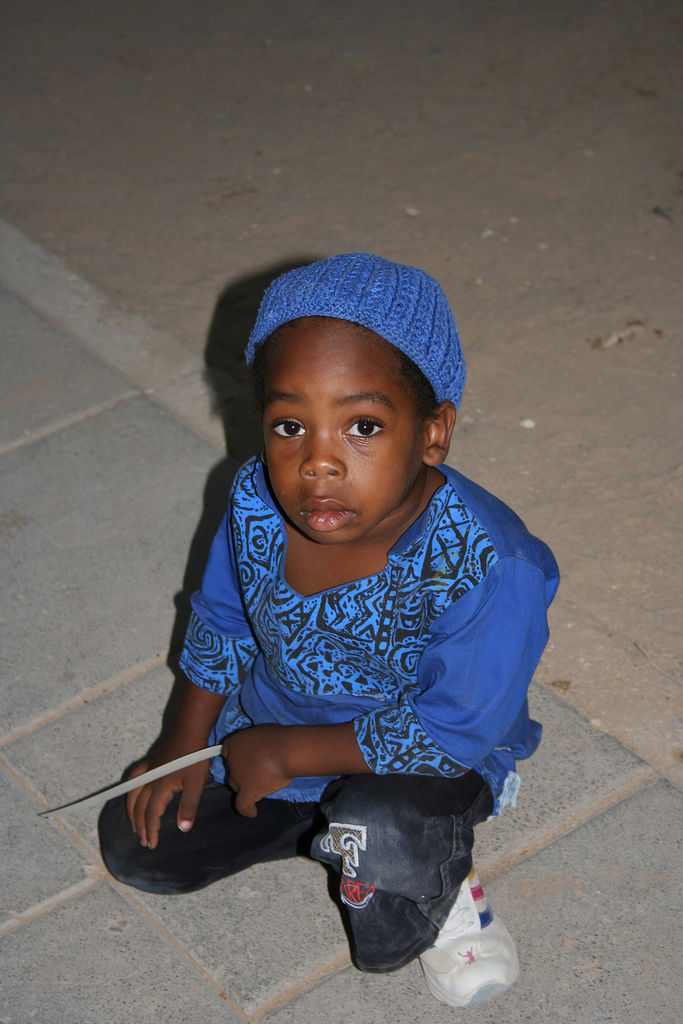
A child of the Black Hebrew Israelite community, in Dimona, September 2005

Black Hebrew Israelites are groups of people mostly of African American ancestry who believe they are descendants of the ancient Israelites. They are generally not accepted as Jews by the greater Jewish community. Many choose to self-identify as Hebrew Israelites or Black Hebrews rather than as Jews.

When the first Black Hebrews arrived in Israel in 1969, they claimed citizenship under the Law of Return, which gives eligible Jews immediate citizenship. The Israeli government ruled in 1973 that the group did not qualify for automatic citizenship, and the Black Hebrews were denied work permits and state benefits. The group responded by accusing the Israeli government of racist discrimination.

In 1981, a group of American civil rights activist led by Bayard Rustin investigated and concluded that racism was not the cause of Black Hebrews' situation. In 1990, Illinois legislators helped negotiate an agreement that resolved the Black Hebrews' legal status in Israel. Members of the group are permitted to work and have access to housing and social services. In 2003, the agreement was revised, and the Black Hebrews were granted permanent resident status.

In his 1992 essay "Blacks and Jews: The Uncivil War", historian Taylor Branch wrote that Black Hebrews were initially denied citizenship due to anti-black sentiment among Israeli Jews (according to mainstream Jewish religious authorities, members of the Black Hebrew Israelite group are not Jewish). According to historian Dr. Seth Forman, the claims that the Black Hebrew Israelites were denied citizenship because they were black seem baseless, particularly in light of Israel's airlift of thousands of black Ethiopian Jews in the early 1990s.

==== Racism against Black African non-Jews ====
In April 2012, the Swedish newspaper Svenska Dagbladet reported that tens of thousands of refugees and African migrant workers who have come to Israel in dangerous smuggling routes, live in southern Tel Aviv's Levinsky Park. SvD reported that some Africans in the park sleep on cardboard boxes under the stars, others crowd in dark hovels. Also was noted a situation with African refugees, such as Sudanese from Darfur, Eritreans, Ethiopians and other African nationalities, who stand in queue to the soup kitchen, organized by Israeli volunteers. The interior minister reportedly "wants everyone to be deported".

In May 2012, disgruntlement toward Africans and calls for deportation and "blacks out" in Tel Aviv boiled over into death threats, fire bombings, rioting, and property destruction. Protesters blamed immigrants for worsening crime and the local economy, some of protesters were seen throwing eggs at African immigrants

In March 2018, chief Sephardic Rabbi of Israel, Yitzhak Yosef, used the term Kushi to refer to black people, which has Talmudic origins but is a derogatory word for people of African descent in modern Hebrew. He also reportedly likened black people to monkeys.

== Inter-ethnic relations ==
=== Arab-Jewish riots ===
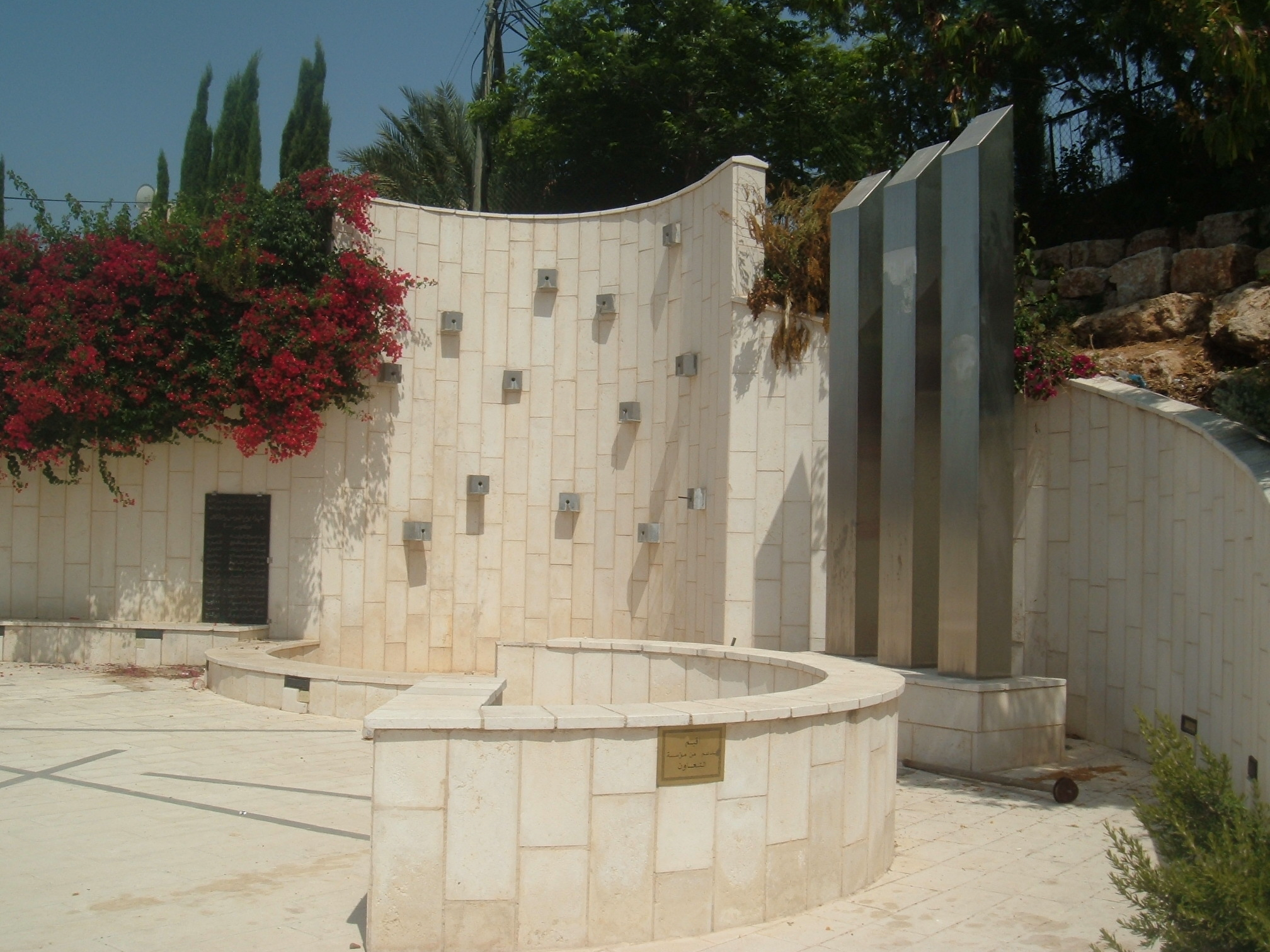
Monument to Israeli Arab casualties in October 2000 riots, Nazareth

In what became known as the October 2000 events, Arab-Israelis rioted while protesting Israeli actions in the early stages of the Second Intifada, attacking Jewish civilians and Israeli police with live gunfire, molotov cocktails, stones, and vandalism of Jewish property. One Egged bus was torched on the first day. Arab rioting took place in Umm al-Fahm, Baqa al-Gharbiyye, Sakhnin, Nazareth, Lod, Kafar Kanna, Mashhad, Arraba, Ramla, Or Akiva and Nazareth Illit. A Jewish citizen was killed when his car was stoned, and a synagogue was torched. Hundreds of Arab residents of Jaffa burned tires, threw rocks, and beat reporters. Throughout the course of the riots, Israeli Police repeatedly opened fire at Arab riots and demonstrations, killing 13 people, including 12 Arab-Israelis and one Palestinian from Gaza.

Thousands of Jews counter-rioted against Arabs in Nazareth, Bat Yam, Petah Tikva, Tiberias, Tel Aviv, Acre, Nazareth Illit, Lod, Rosh HaAyin, Or Akiva and Jerusalem, throwing stones at and beating Arabs, vandalizing and torching Arab homes and property, attacking Arab traffic, and chanting "Death to the Arabs!".

Sam Lehman-Wilzig, Political Communications Professor at Bar-Ilan University, said that rioting is rare and alien to Jewish political society. "The numbers (of riots) are so low because of our Jewish political culture which encourages protesting, but seriously discourages violent protest," he said. He argues that the riots were caused since Israelis felt threatened by the "pressure cooker syndrome" of fighting not just the Palestinians and Lebanon's Hezbollah guerrillas, but also the Israeli Arab population.

In 2008, a series of riots broke out in Acre, after an Arab motorist and his teenage son drove into a predominantly Jewish neighborhood during Yom Kippur, the holiest day in the Jewish religion, to visit relatives. According to police, their car's windows were down and music was blaring. Police spokesperson Eran Shaked said that "this was a provocation... we believe he was intoxicated. This was a deliberate act". An incorrect rumor spread among the Arab residents that the driver had been killed, prompting calls from local mosques to avenge his death. Arabs rioted in the city center, smashing shop windows, vandalizing vehicles, and throwing rocks at people going to or from Yom Kippur prayers, chanting "Death to the Jews" and "If you come out of your homes, you will die". Israeli Police forcibly dispersed the rioters with tear gas and stun grenades. As soon as the Yom Kippur fast ended, about 200 Jewish residents rioted in Acre's Arab neighborhoods, torching homes, vandalizing property, and forcing dozens of families to flee. Riots and retaliations by both sides continued for four days.

During the course of monitoring elections in 2009, a Member of the Knesset (MK) replaced another Jewish election monitor at the Israeli-Arab town of Umm al-Fahm, who was prevented by police from entering the city because of threats by local Arabs on his life. As soon as the MK began to perform his duties, an Israeli-Arab mob rioted outside attacking the guards and shouts of "Death to the Jews" could be heard. Israeli Police arrested five rioters.

== Efforts against racism and discrimination ==
Israel has a law that prohibits incitement to racism.

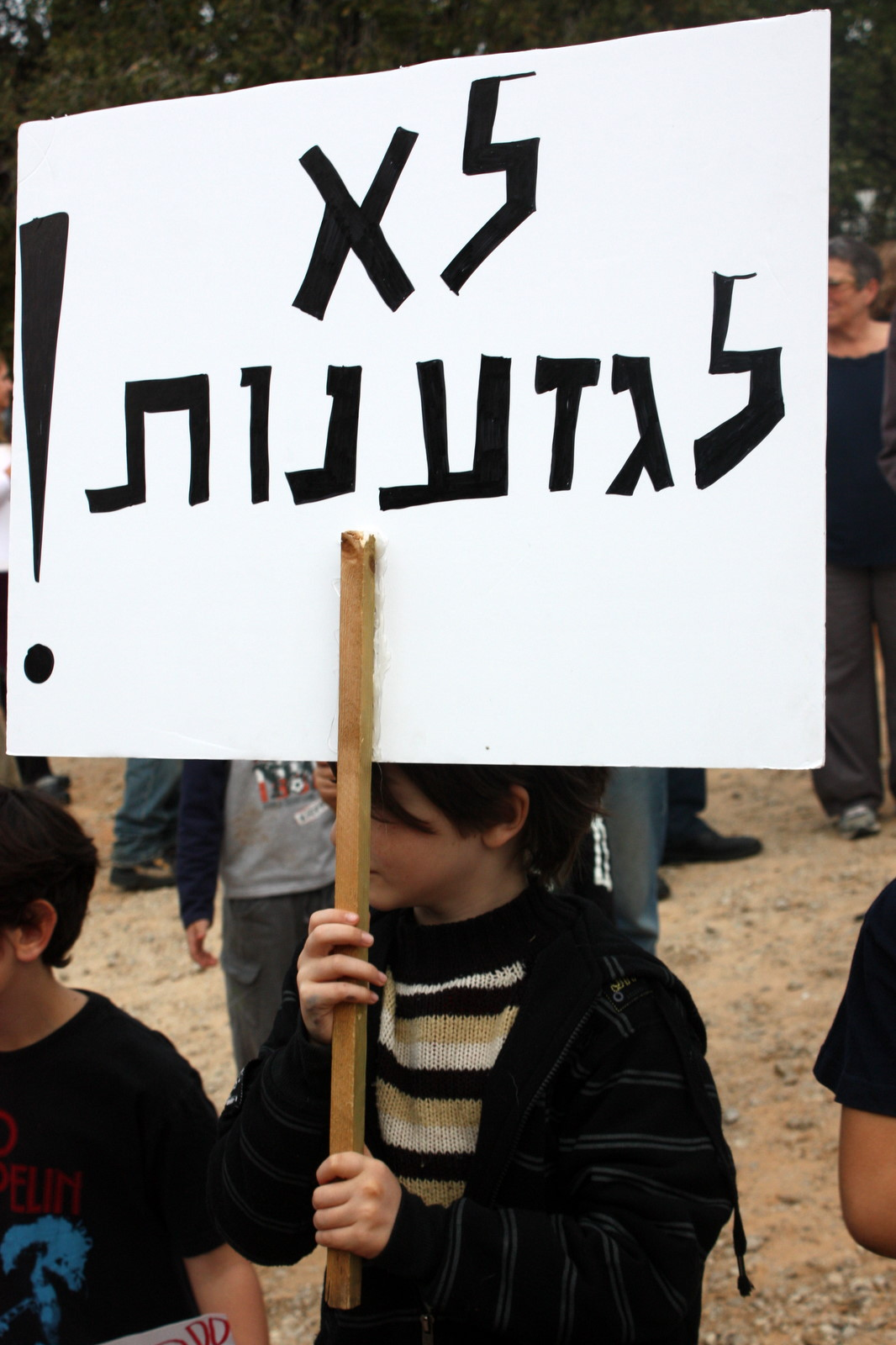
Israeli protest in Pardes Hana against racism, 2010. The sign reads "No to racism".

According to the State Department, Israel's anti-discrimination law "prohibits discrimination on the basis of sex, marital status, or sexual orientation. The law also prohibits discrimination by both government and nongovernment entities on the basis of race, religion, political beliefs, and age."

Israel is a signatory of the International Convention on the Elimination of All Forms of Racial Discrimination treaty since 1966, and has ratified the treaty in 1979.

=== Affirmative action ===
In response to inequality between the Jewish and Arab populations, the Israeli government established a committee to consider, among other issues, policies of affirmative action for housing Arab citizens. According to Israel advocacy group Stand With Us, the city of Jerusalem gives Arab residents free professional advice to assist with the housing permit process and structural regulations, advice which is not available to Jewish residents on the same terms.

== Reports addressing racism in Israel ==
- Amnesty International annual reports on Israel – 2013 report, 2012 report, 2011 report, 2010 report, 2009 report, 2008 report, 2007 report
- Association for Civil Rights in Israel (ACRI) annual reports – 2014 report, 2013 report, 2012 report, 2011 report, 2009 report, 2008 report, 2007 report
- United States Department of State annual Human Rights reports on Israel – 2014 report, 2013 report, 2012 report, 2011 report, 2010 report, 2009 report, 2008 report, 2007 report, 2006 report, 2005 report, 2004 report
- United Nations CERD – 2007 CERD report, unedited version of 2007 report
- Or Commission – "The Official Summation of the Or Commission Report"

== See also ==
- Anti-Palestinian sentiment
- Timeline of attacks against synagogues in Israel
- Criticism of Israel
- Human rights in Israel
- Israeli apartheid
- Israeli settler violence
- Neo-Nazism in Israel
- Racism in the Palestinian territories
- Secularism in Israel
- Torat Hamelekh
- Zion Square assault
- Ethnic profiling in Israel
