= May Your Village Burn =

Political chant

"May Your Village Burn" (Hebrew: "שיישרף לכם הכפר", modern Israeli pronunciation: she-isaref lachem ha-kfar) is a racist chant associated with the far right in Israel, which wishes for the burning of the homes of Palestinians, including Arab citizens of Israel. It is also a reference to the 1948 Palestinian expulsion and ethnic cleansing perpetrated by Zionist paramilitary groups in the 1948 Palestine War.

The song was composed by Beitar Jerusalem fans affiliated with the "La Familia" ultras group and became popular among right-wing organizations in Israel, especially after the October 7 attacks.

== Composition ==
The song was composed in 2005 by Beitar Jerusalem fans associated with "La Familia", in the context of the rivalry between Beitar Jerusalem and Bnei Sakhnin, which developed against the backdrop of the Israeli–Palestinian conflict. The lyrics of the song: כולם יודעים שיש פה כמה שמאלנים שנסעו לסולחה בסכנין, אותנו הם לא מייצגים [Everyone knows that there are some leftists here who went to the Solha in Sakhnin, they do not represent us] were written in response to a Solha meeting that took place in Sakhnin in September 2005 between Beitar Jerusalem fans and Bnei Sakhnin fans, along with Abbas Suan and Mazan Ghnaim.

The authors of the song describe themselves as "crazy" people sitting in the eastern stands at Teddy Stadium, and oppose the attempts at reconciliation that have been made over the years between Beitar Jerusalem and Bnei Sakhnin (for example, by Arcadi Gaydamak), and it is implied from the spirit of the words that they also oppose the Israeli–Palestinian peace process.

== Use ==
=== Association football games ===
The song "May Your Village Burn" is associated with fans of Beitar Jerusalem and the "La Familia" group, but it has also been sung over the years by fans of other association football teams that played against Bnei Sakhnin. It was mentioned several times in the "Racism in Soccer Index Report," which surveys violent incidents in Israeli soccer.

One of the first recordings of the song is from November 2005, when several dozen Hapoel Nazareth Elite fans chanted at Bnei Sakhnin fans and players: "הלוואי שיישרף לכם הכפר [I wish your village would burn down]". That same year, it was also sung by fans of Hapoel Tel Aviv and Beitar Jerusalem, who were mentioned as the most prominent teams in the "Racism in Football Index Report". In February 2006, it was sung at a match between Beitar Jerusalem and Bnei Sakhnin and has since been particularly prominent in the team's matches, given the rivalry between Beitar Jerusalem and Bnei Sakhnin.

A 2017 video shows crowds of Beitar Jerusalem fans singing the song at Teddy Stadium. In January 2018, Miri Regev, the Minister of Sports, gave a speech at the stadium, and at the end of her speech, Beitar Jerusalem fans burst into her presence singing the song "May Your Village Burn".

Maccabi Tel Aviv fans adopted the song in 2009, during a game in which they also chanted insults at Salim Tuama, and over the years Maccabi Tel Aviv fans have returned to this song many times during the team's games against Bnei Sakhnin.

In April 2024, the Beitar Jerusalem football team was prosecuted for incidents during a football match against Maccabi Netanya in which chants of "May your village burn" were heard, along with other racist chants. The team's lawyer argued that "there is no difference between this and 'Tel Aviv is on fire'", or calling for the death of a player from the opposing team.

=== Jerusalem Day ===
Israelis on Jerusalem Day 2025 near Damascus Gate, the lyrics: Listen carefully you Arabs, we don't forgive and the song always remains: "May your village burn down"

From 2011 onwards, the song, along with similar racist songs, was sung by groups of participants in the flag parade in Jerusalem, during clashes with Arab residents in the Muslim Quarter.

For several years, the Emek Shaveh organization has documented students from dozens of yeshivahs who participated in the Flag Parade in Jerusalem and sang this song and other similar songs, while behaving violently during the parade. In 2024, Israeli marchers chanted "May Your Village Burn" as well as "May their name be erased" and others. Also in May 2025, the song was sung by many of the participants in the Flag Parade in Jerusalem as they passed through the Muslim Quarter in the Old City.

=== Far right demonstrations ===
A 2014 article about the activities of far-right organizations in Israel reported that this was one of the most popular songs at these organizations' demonstrations.

In September 2022, Israeli Minister of National Security Itamar Ben-Gvir visited Blich High School in Ramat Gan, and a large group of his supporters from among the students stood near the school gate and chanted "May your village burn down".

=== During the Gaza war ===
The song became popular among right-wing organizations in Israel during the Gaza war.

In early November 2023, a large group of soldiers from the Benjamin Brigade were filmed singing the song. An IDF spokesman responded: "התנהלות החיילים אינה עולה בקנה אחד עם פקודות צה"ל וערכיו. האירוע יתוחקר ויטופל משמעתית בהתאם [The soldiers' conduct is inconsistent with IDF orders and values. The incident will be investigated and disciplinary action will be taken accordingly.]"

That same month, child star Manny Mamtara joined in singing "May Your Village Burn" at a wedding in Beit Shemesh that he attended, and later apologized for it.

In January 2024, the phrase was mentioned in a South African complaint against Israel for genocide, with examples of statements using it by Knesset members Tally Gotliv, Galit Distel-Atbaryan, and Avigdor Lieberman, as well as singer Kobi Peretz. It also featured videos in which IDF soldiers recorded themselves in operational activity in the Gaza Strip while singing the song.

In June 2024, the song was played at a graduation party at an elementary school in Jerusalem. The Jerusalem Municipality condemned the event, saying: "This is not the way of the Jerusalem education system."

In June 2025, during the Twelve-Day War, four Palestinian women from the Khatib family were killed by a direct hit by a missile in a house in Tamra, and 20 others were slightly injured. During the missile attack, a group of Israelis near Tamra were filmed cheering as the missiles fell and recording themselves chanting "May your village burn." Arab citizens demanded that they be questioned, as the police do in Arab communities. President Isaac Herzog condemned the video.

== See also ==
- Death to Arabs
