= Jerusalem Day =

Israeli national holiday

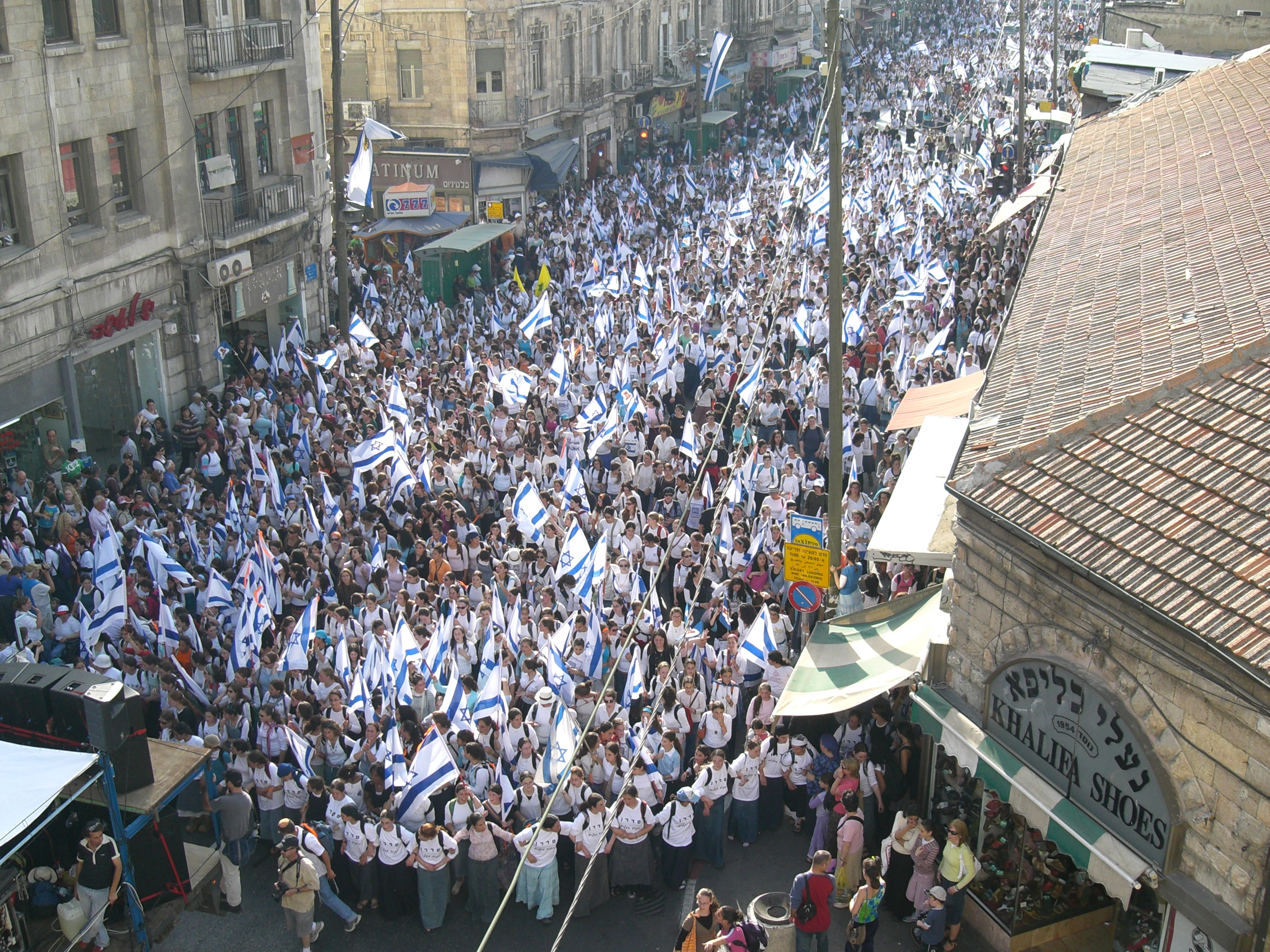
- The Israeli Dance of Flags at Jaffa Road, 2007
- Official name: יום ירושלים (Yom Yerushaláyim)
- Observed by: Israelis
- Type: National
- Significance: Marks the reunification of East Jerusalem with West Jerusalem under Israel; the first time the whole city came under Jewish rule since the destruction of the Second Temple in 70 CE during the Jewish–Roman wars
- Celebrations: Dance of Flags
- Date: 28 Iyar (Hebrew calendar)
- 2025 date: Sunset, 25 May – nightfall, 26 May
- 2026 date: Sunset, 14 May – nightfall, 15 May
- 2027 date: Sunset, 3 June – nightfall, 4 June
- 2028 date: Sunset, 23 May – nightfall, 24 May
- Frequency: Annual
- First time: 12 May 1968

Jerusalem Day (Hebrew: יום ירושלים, Yom Yerushaláyim) is an Israeli national holiday that commemorates the joining of East Jerusalem (including the Old City of Jerusalem) with West Jerusalem following the Six-Day War of 1967, in which Israel occupied East Jerusalem and the West Bank. Israel views East Jerusalem as fully annexed; this view of the status of Jerusalem is disputed by others. Jerusalem Day is celebrated annually on 28 Iyar on the Hebrew calendar, and is marked officially throughout Israel with state ceremonies and memorial services.

A notable celebration that marks the holiday is a flag-flying parade known as the Dance of Flags. In recent years, there have been anti-Palestinian chants in these parades, including "Death to Arabs," "May Your Village Burn," and others. The parade involves flag-bearers marching through the city streets, accompanied by mobile orchestras on trucks playing Hasidic songs. The Chief Rabbinate of Israel declared Jerusalem Day to be a minor religious holiday, as it marks the regaining for Jewish people of access to the Western Wall.

== Historical background ==
Under the 1947 United Nations Partition Plan for Palestine, which proposed the establishment of two states in British Mandatory Palestine – a Jewish state and an Arab state – Jerusalem was to be an international city, neither exclusively Arab nor Jewish for a period of ten years, at which point a referendum would be held by Jerusalem residents to determine which country to join. The Jewish leadership accepted the plan, including the internationalization of Jerusalem, but the Arabs rejected the proposal.

A civil war between Jewish forces and Palestinian Arabs in Mandatory Palestine internationalized in to the 1948 Arab–Israeli War the day after Israel declared independence and the surrounding Arab states sent their armies in to the former Mandate territory. Jordan captured East Jerusalem and the Old City while Israel captured the western section of the city. Israeli forces made a concerted attempt to dislodge the Jordanians but were unable to do so, and the war concluded with Jerusalem divided between Israel and Jordan by the Green Line. The Old City and the rest of East Jerusalem, along with the entirety of the West Bank, was occupied by Jordan, who forced the Jewish residents out, while the Palestinian Arab residents of western Jerusalem, at the time one of the more prosperous Arab communities, fled widespread looting and attacks by the Haganah, going from 28,000 to fewer than 750 remaining. Under Jordanian rule, half of the Old City's 58 synagogues were demolished and the Jewish cemetery on the Mount of Olives was plundered for its tombstones, which were used as paving stones and building materials.

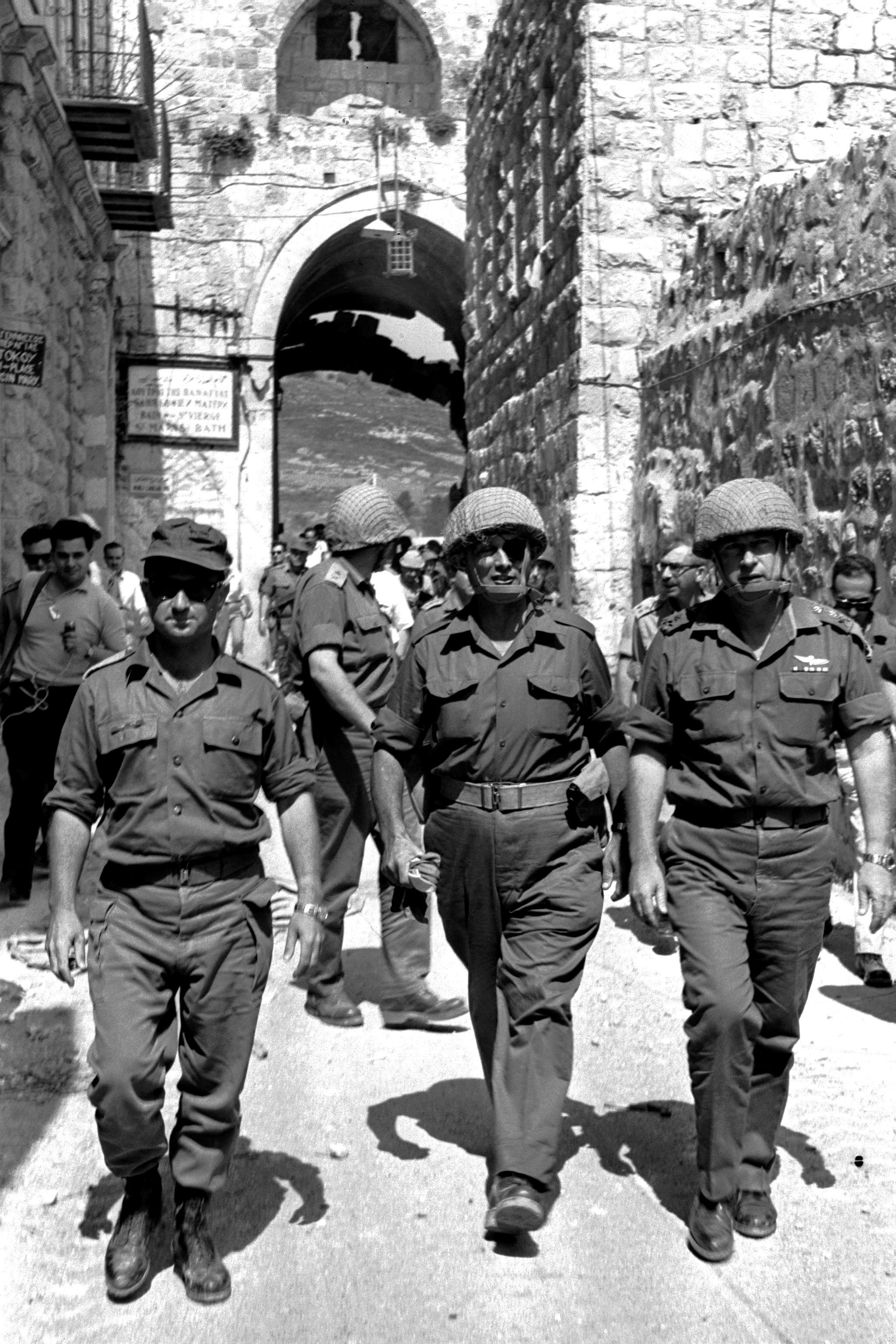
Chief of Staff Lt. Gen. Yitzhak Rabin in the entrance to the old city of Jerusalem during the Six Day War, with Moshe Dayan and Uzi Narkiss

In 1967, in the Six-Day War, Israel captured and occupied East Jerusalem and the rest of the West Bank from Jordan on 7 June 1967. Later that day, Defense Minister Moshe Dayan declared what is often quoted during Jerusalem Day:

This morning, the Israel Defense Forces liberated Jerusalem. We have united Jerusalem, the divided capital of Israel. We have returned to the holiest of our holy places, never to part from it again. To our Arab neighbors we extend, also at this hour—and with added emphasis at this hour—our hand in peace. And to our Christian and Muslim fellow citizens, we solemnly promise full religious freedom and rights. We did not come to Jerusalem for the sake of other peoples' holy places, and not to interfere with the adherents of other faiths, but in order to safeguard its entirety, and to live there together with others, in unity.

The war ended with a ceasefire on 11 June 1967 with Israel in control of the entirety of territory of Mandatory Palestine, including all of Jerusalem, in addition to the Sinai Peninsula and the Golan Heights. On 27 June 1967, Israel expanded the municipal boundaries of West Jerusalem so as to include approximately 70 km^{2} (27.0 sq mi) of territory it had captured in the war, including the entirety of the formerly Jordanian held municipality of East Jerusalem (6 km^{2} (2.3 sq mi)) and an additional 28 villages and areas of the Bethlehem and Beit Jala municipalities 64 km^{2} (25 sq mi). On 30 July 1980, the Knesset officially approved the Jerusalem Law, which called the city the complete and united capital.

== Celebrations ==
On 12 May 1968, the government proclaimed a new holiday – Jerusalem Day – to be celebrated on the 28th of Iyar, the Hebrew date on which the divided city of Jerusalem became one. On 23 March 1998, the Knesset passed the Jerusalem Day Law, making the day a national holiday.

One of the celebrations marking Jerusalem Day is a youth parade with flags known as Dance of Flags, which begins at Gan Sacher, winds through the streets of downtown Jerusalem, threads through the old city and ends with a gathering for a final prayer at the Western Wall. During the parade, flag-bearers are accompanied by mobile orchestras on trucks playing Hasidic songs. The parade is controversial, and violent interactions have been reported between Arabs and Israeli youth during the procession.

One of the themes of Jerusalem Day, based on a verse from the Psalms, is "Built-up Jerusalem is like a city that was joined together" (Psalm 122:3).

In 1977, the government advanced the date of Jerusalem Day by a week to avoid it clashing with Election Day.

In 2015, Yad Sarah a non-profit volunteer organization began organizing a special tour specifically for residents who use wheelchairs, which focuses on Jerusalem history.

=== Anti-Palestinian chants ===
Racist and anti-Arab slogans are often shouted at the march of flags (2014)

In 2011, 2015, 2016, 2017, 2018, 2021, 2022, 2023, 2024, 2025, and 2026 Israeli nationalists have chanted "Death to Arabs" (Israeli Hebrew: מָוֶת לָעֲרָבִים, romanized: Mávet la'Aravím) in parades on Jerusalem Day. According to Nadera Shalhoub-Kevorkian, the Jerusalem Day parade is a "spatialized enactment of power," and in 2015, "over 30,000 young religious and nationalist Israeli Jews rampaged throughout the Old City of OEJ chanting 'Death to Arabs', 'Muhammad is Dead' and other racist slogans, restructuring the sensory experiences of Palestinians in the space." In 2024, chants included "burn Shu'afat" or "Shu'afat is on fire" in reference to the Palestinian neighborhood in East Jerusalem where a Palestinian boy was kidnapped and set on fire, as well as the Hebrew curse with Biblical origins for enemies of the Jewish people "May their name be erased." In 2025, the chanters numbered in the thousands and also sang "May Your Village Burn." Other chants include "Muhammad is dead" and "a Jew is a soul, an Arab is a son of a whore." In 2026, a participant told a reporter that she felt that Islam was a cancer, and the only option was to either kill or re-educate all of them.

=== 50th anniversary ===
In 2017, the golden jubilee of Jerusalem Day was celebrated. During the course of the year many events marking this milestone took place in celebrations of the 50th Jerusalem Day. Many events were planned throughout the year, marking the jubilee. The main theme of the celebrations was the "Liberation of Jerusalem". The celebrations began during Hanukkah 2016, at an official ceremony held at the City of David National Park in the presence of Minister Miri Regev, who was responsible for the celebrations marking the 50th anniversary. A logo was created for the jubilee and presented by the minister Miri Regev.

==== Events During the Jubilee Year ====
The ceremony was held at the City of David National Park at the event the ancient "Pilgrims' Route", that led from the City of David to the Temple Mount during the Second Temple period, was unveiled. The ceremony was attended by Knesset members, mayors and the three paratroopers that were photographed by David Rubinger at the Western Wall in 1967. At the event, the Minister Miri Regev was quoted by the press as saying, "Mr. President Barack Obama, I am standing here, on Hanukka, on the same road on which my forefathers walked 2,000 years ago ... No resolution in any international forum is as strong as the steadfast stones on this street." Noting several of the 14 countries that participated in the resolution – including New Zealand, Ukraine, Senegal, and Malaysia – the minister added, "no other people in the world has such a connection and link to their land."

== Significance ==
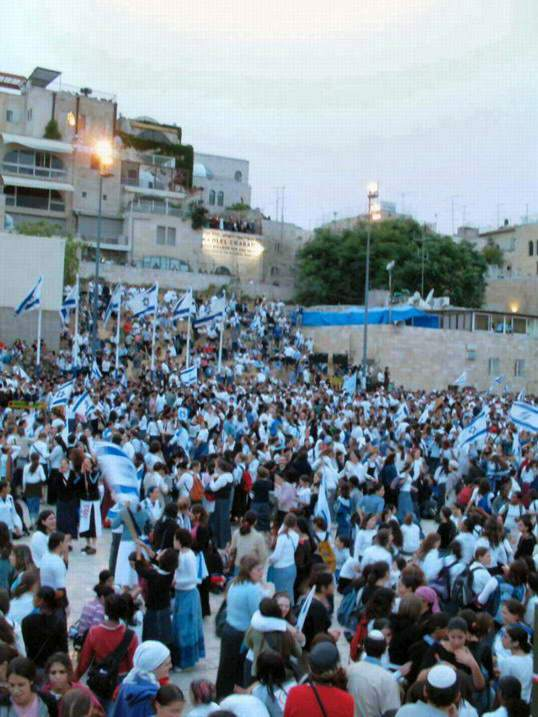
Jerusalem Day 2004 at the Western Wall

While the day is not widely celebrated outside Israel, and has lost its significance for most secular Israelis, the day is still very much celebrated by Israel's Religious Zionist community with parades and additional prayers in the synagogue.

=== Religious observance ===
Religious Zionists recite special holiday prayers with Hallel. The Chief Rabbinate of Israel ruled in favor of reciting Hallel with a blessing on this day. Rabbi Isser Yehuda Unterman, Ashkenazi chief rabbi at the time, explained this decision as follows: "When the state was declared [in 1948], we asked the Creator of the World a question, and we did not know if our way would succeed. In the six days we received an answer!" Other rabbis (including Rabbis Ovadia Yosef and Joseph B. Soloveitchik) ruled that Hallel should or could be recited only without a blessing, either because Israel was still in danger, or for technical reasons. Today, various communities follow differing practices.

Some Haredim (strictly Orthodox), who do not recognise the religious significance of the State of Israel, do not observe Yom Yerushalayim. Rabbi Moshe Feinstein maintained that adding holidays to the Jewish calendar was itself problematic.

In 2015, Koren Publishers Jerusalem published a machzor dedicated to observance of Jerusalem Day and Independence Day.

== Reactions and concerns ==
The settlement of Eastern Jerusalem and the claim of Jerusalem as a capital for the State of Israel is controversial among the left wing and the Arab population of Jerusalem, who regard it as a day marking the conquest of the West Bank and the Gaza Strip.

In 2014, the Meretz political party submitted a bill to repeal the Jerusalem Day Law.

Celebrating Jerusalem Day 2025 near Damascus Gate, the lyrics: Listen carefully you Arabs, we don't forgive and the song always remains: "May your village burn down"

In May 2015, the Israeli High Court of Justice rejected a petition to prevent the Jerusalem Day parade from marching through the Muslim sector of the city. The justices said, however, that police must arrest parade participants who shout racist and violent epithets such as "Death to the Arabs!" or commit violent acts.

== Ethiopian Jews' Memorial Day ==
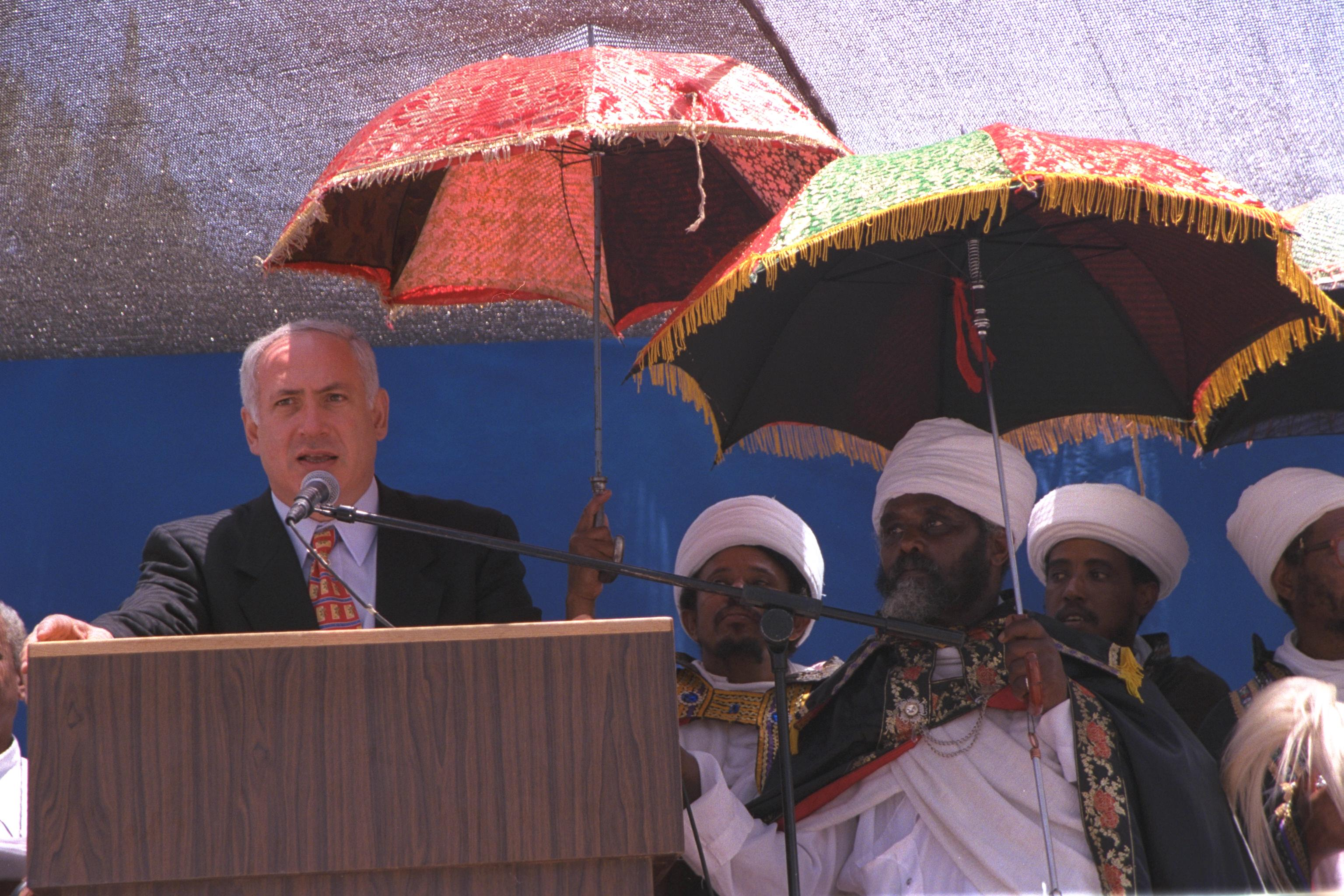
Prime Minister Benjamin Netanyahu speaking at the ceremony in Jerusalem alongside the Priests of Beta Israel, 1998

A ceremony is held on Yom Yerushalayim to commemorate the Beta Israel who perished on their way to Israel. In 2004, the Israeli government decided to turn this ceremony into a state ceremony held at the memorial site for Ethiopian Jews who perished on their way to Israel on Mount Herzl.

== See also ==
- History of Jerusalem
- Independence Day (Israel)
- Quds Day (Persian: روز قدس, Arabic: يوم القدس; lit. Jerusalem Day, with Quds being the Arabic name for Jerusalem), established in Iran one year after the Islamic Revolution to express opposition to Zionism and the state of Israel
