= Jerusalem Day march =

Annual far-right parade in Jerusalem

Dance of Flags ריקוד דגלים
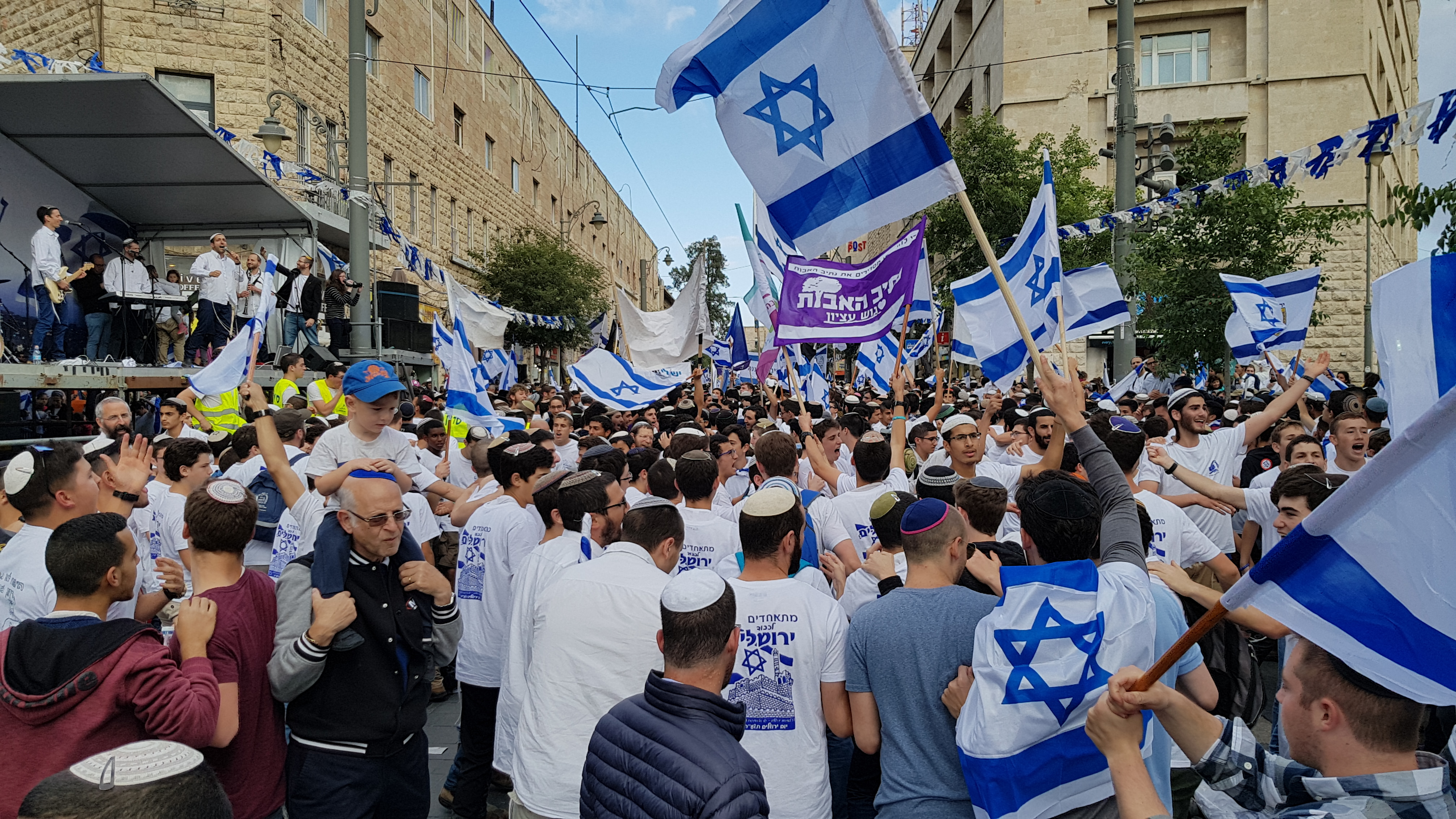
- Israeli paraders walking through Jerusalem's Mamilla neighborhood, 2018
- Status: Occurring
- Genre: Flag flying parade
- Date: 28 Iyar
- Frequency: Annually
- Locations: Old City of Jerusalem, East Jerusalem, Israeli-occupied West Bank
- Years active: 58
- Inaugurated: 26 May 1968
- Most recent: 14 May 2026
- Attendance: 50,000
- Major events: Marching, waving the flag of Israel, racist chants

The March of Flags (מצעד הדגלים, Mitzad ha’Degalim), or Dance of Flags (Hebrew: ריקוד דגלים or ריקודגלים, romanized: Rikud Degalim), is an annual flag flying parade on Jerusalem Day to celebrate what some Israelis term the "reunification of Jerusalem", but more widely-recognised as the military occupation and illegal annexation of East Jerusalem of the West Bank after the 1967 Arab–Israeli War.

The event, which passes through the Old City's Muslim Quarter in East Jerusalem, is regularly attended by far-right Jewish Israelis, including the far-right Lehava organisation, and is often accompanied by violence, especially against the Palestinian residents of East Jerusalem. Since 2011, attendees regular chanted racist and anti-Arab slogans such as "death to Arabs," "A Jew is a soul, an Arab is the son of a whore," and "May Your Village Burn." Palestinian residents frequently shutter their businesses and homes on the day of the march for fear of being subjected to violence from Israeli marchers, or after being ordered to do so by the Israel Police, who also institute closures and checkpoints in and around the Old City.

While Israelis consider the day a display of Jewish sovereignty over the whole of Jerusalem, Palestinians consider it an unnecessary provocation and expression of dominance in East Jerusalem, an area that is considered part of the occupied Palestinian territories.

== Parade ==
During the parade, Israeli flag-bearers march through the city streets, accompanied by mobile orchestras on trucks playing Hasidic songs. At several points along the way, stationary stages are set up on which performances by artists take place. Although in the first years of the parade various sectors of the Israeli society took part in it, today, most of the participants in the march and celebrations are members of Religious Zionism who journey to the city from all over Israel.

== History ==
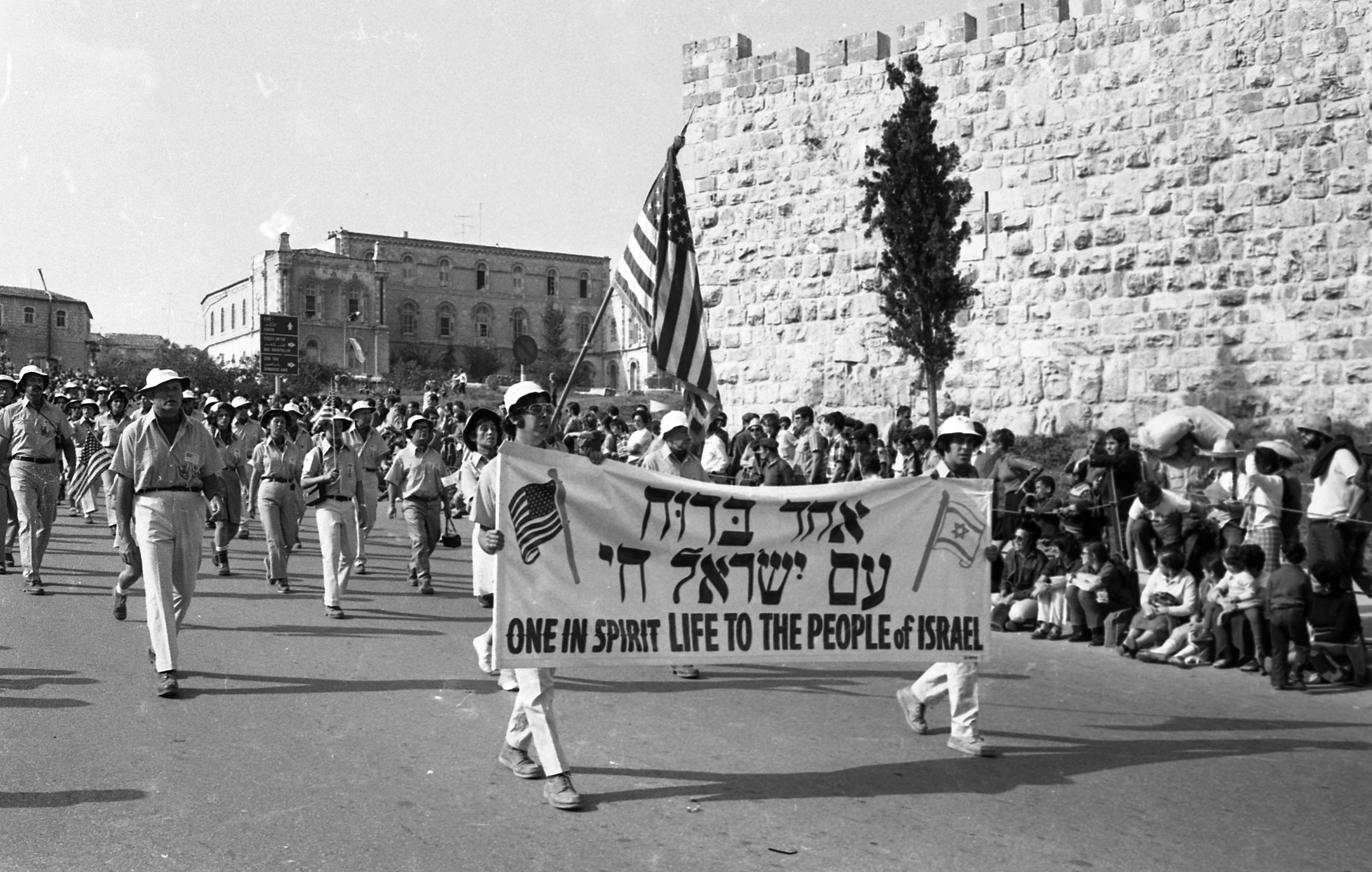
March on April 7, 1971

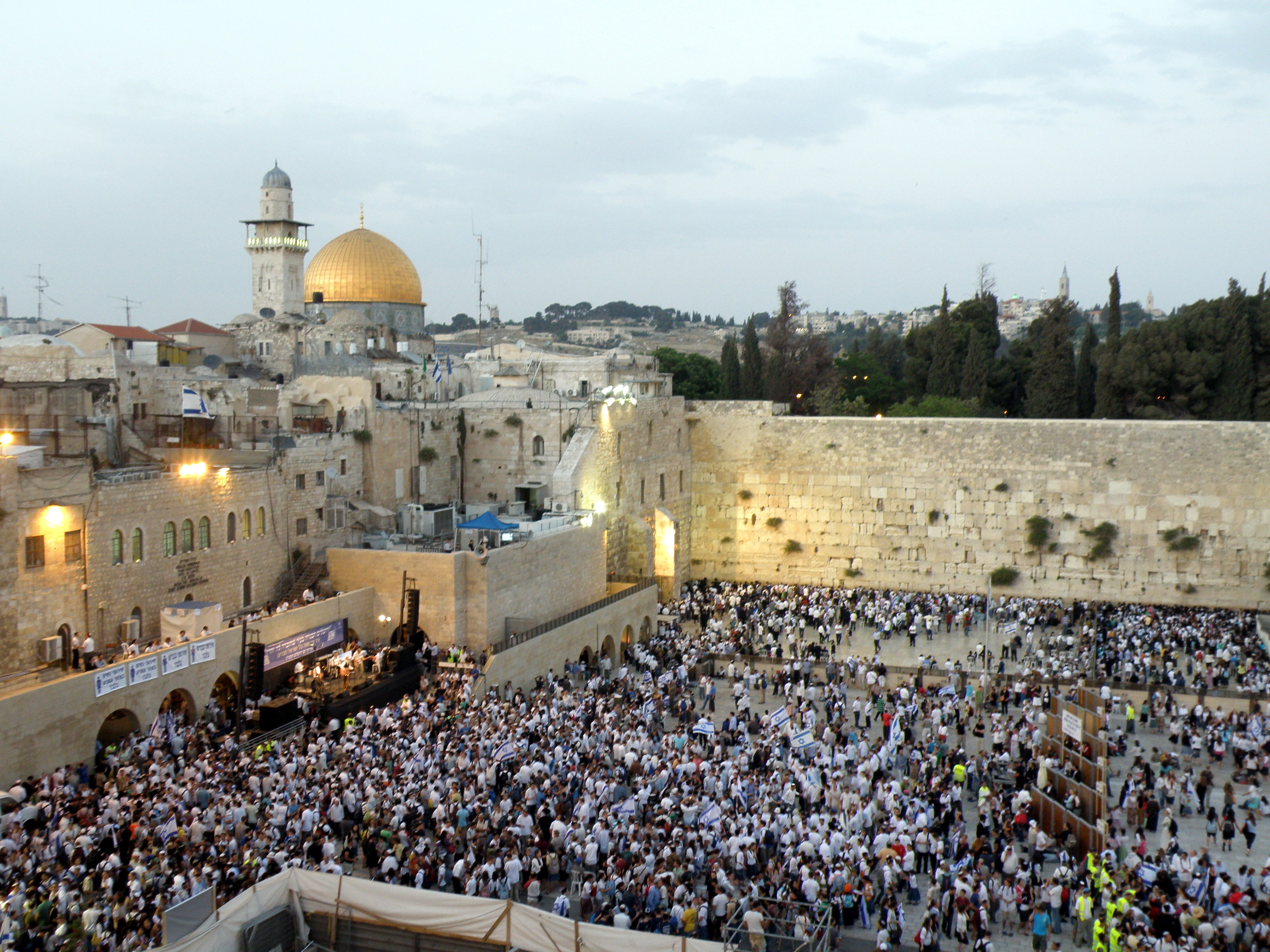
Dance of Flags at the Western Wall

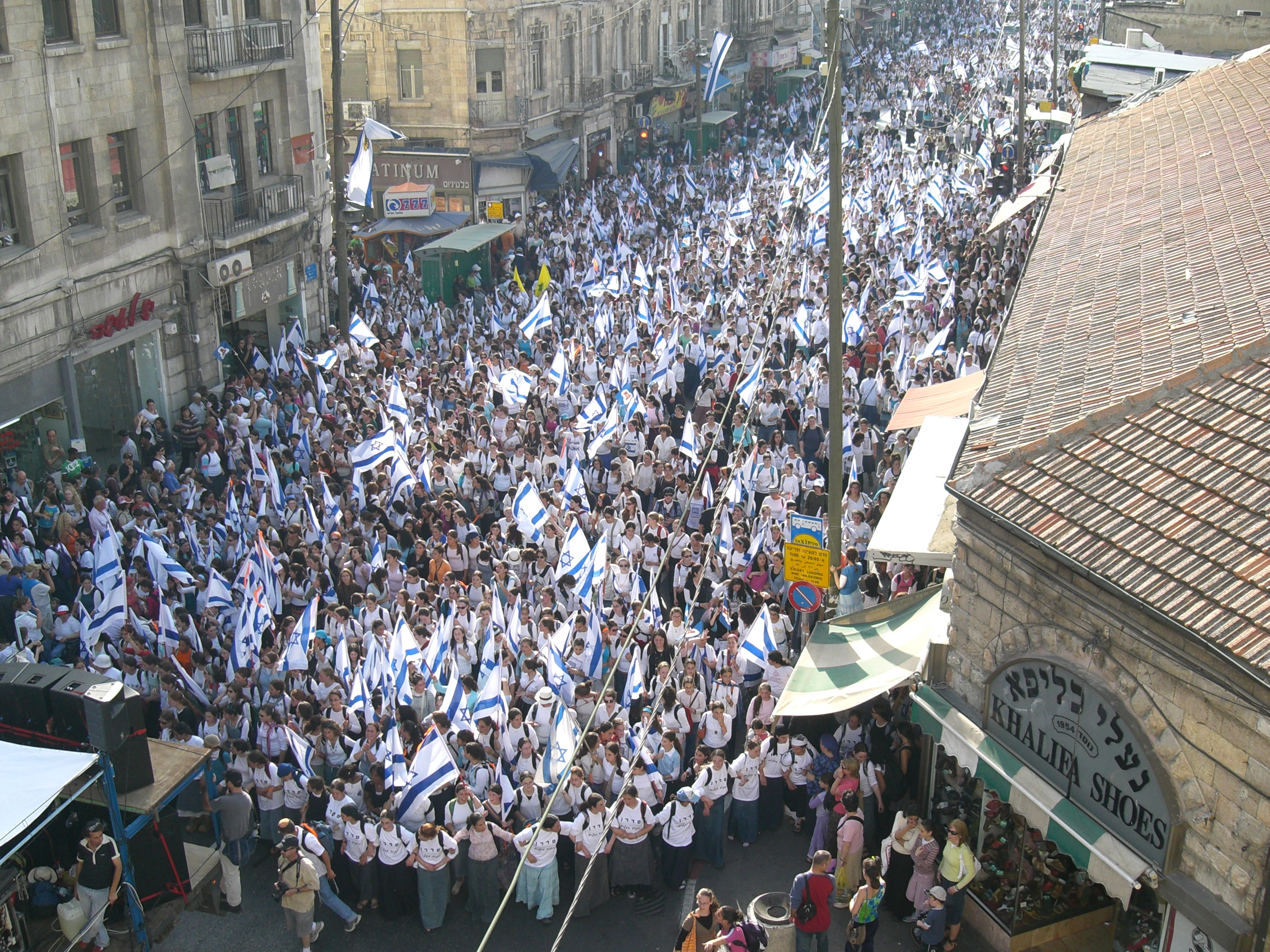
Dance of Flags on Jaffa Road, Jerusalem

The parade has its origins in traditional pilgrimage practices that celebrated the city of Jerusalem by entering the walled city through all of its gates. The custom was revived some time in the early years after the 1967 war, when Rabbi Zvi Yehuda Kook and his followers in Mercaz HaRav Yeshiva marched to the Western Wall through Jaffa Road, singing and dancing, at night after the end of the celebratory dinner at the Yeshiva Hall. In the early period, the parade was concentrated in the Jewish Quarter and not the Muslim Quarter, and people from outside the city would use it as an opportunity for pilgrimage and tourism to Jerusalem In 1974, Yehuda Hazani, a yeshiva student, initiated the bringing of an orchestra and the joining of high school yeshivot to the event. It was later decided to move the event to daytime to allow more people to take part in the march.

Today, the march is organized by the "Am Kalavi" (עם כלביא) association. Until his death in December 2022, the procession was headed by Rabbi Haim Drukman. The event is funded by the association, the Jerusalem Municipality, the Ministry of Education and the Society for the Rehabilitation and Development of the Jewish Quarter. In 2018, the event cost about NIS 1 million.

In most years, the parade began in the area of center of Jerusalem, from Independence Park or Sacher Park, then ascended east toward Jaffa Road, through Safra Square, to IDF Square. Mass dancing in collaboration with singers and public figures. In recent years there has been a separation and women march in front of men or vice versa. In the past, marchers used to enter the Old City through the Lions' Gate as well, but in the years 2010-2016, the police banned entry from this gate.

=== Since 2011 ===
Racist and anti-Arab slogans are often shouted at the march of flags (2014).

In 2011, the police diverted the march route eastwards, and it passed from Sheikh Jarrah along the Municipal Road No. 1 (Bar Lev Boulevard), and as before, entered the Old City through some of its gates. In 2015, the Israeli High Court rejected a petition by a coalition of NGOs to change the route of the march so that it does not pass through the Muslim Quarter, though warned that participants engaging in nationalistic violence or shouting anti-Arab slogans could face criminal charges. In 2017, in honor of the 50th anniversary of what Israelis consider the Reunification of Jerusalem, it was decided that the flag dance would also surround the Old City from the east and enter through the Dung Gate.

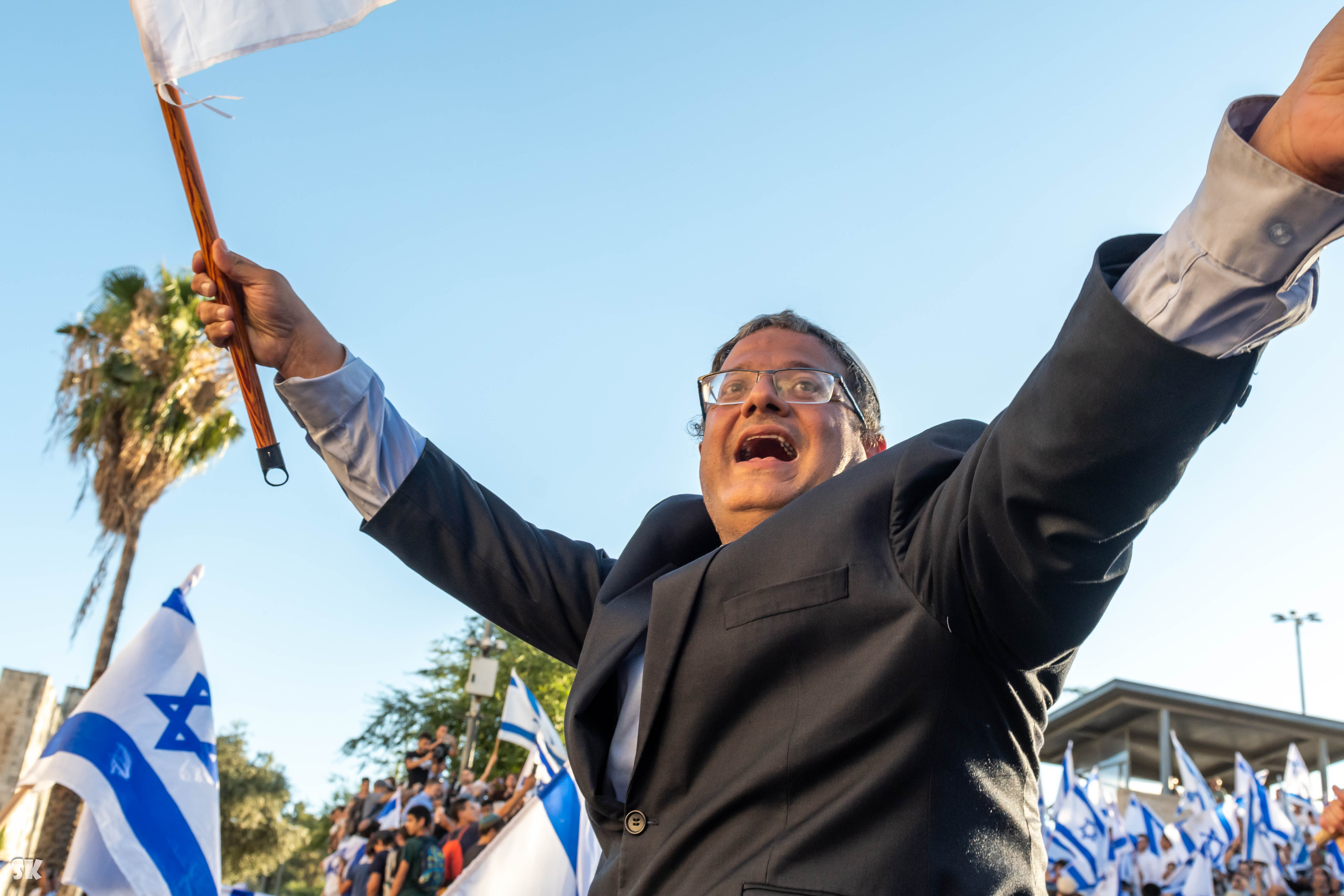
Itamar Ben Gvir at dance of flags, 2021

In 2021, crowds of about 5,000 Israeli citizens participated in the march. Racist and anti-Arab chants were sung by some of the crowd, including "Death to Arabs," and "Shuafat is on fire," a reference to the murder of 16-year-old Palestinian Mohammed Abu Khdeir who was kidnapped, beaten, and set on fire while still alive by Israeli settlers in East Jerusalem in 2014. 33 Palestinians were given medical care by the Palestinian Red Crescent Society, while both Arab and foreign journalists were accosted, spat on, and attacked, and arson balloons sparked 20 fires. The violence contributed to the start of the 2021 Israel–Palestine crisis.

In 2022, some 70,000 Jewish Israelis participated in the march. Middle East Eye reported that Israeli marchers beat and pepper-sprayed Palestinian residents of East Jerusalem as they marched through the Muslim Quarter, wounding at least 79 Palestinians (as many as 160 according to Al-Jazeera, including some struck by live ammunition fired by police), 28 of whom were hospitalised according to the Palestinian Red Crescent Society. Medics attempting to reach the wounded were also attacked by some of the crowd, while properties in the Sheikh Jarrah neighbourhood attacked and vandalised leading to clashes between Palestinian residents and Israeli marchers. A BBC team covering the event "was verbally abused and forcefully shoved by two marchers, causing a cameraman to lose part of his equipment, said the BBC’s Tom Bateman. Nearby Israeli forces stopped them but didn’t take further action, he said." In response to the day’s clashes, Hamas called for a "day of rage" against the marchers.

In 2023, there were about 50,000 participants in the march. Jewish ultra-nationalists assaulted a BBC camera team, shouting "Go and be with Shireen," a reference to the Palestinian-American journalist Shireen Abu Akleh who was killed by Israeli snipers in 2022. At the march, "group of participants hurled stones, water bottles, flag staffs and other items at a crowd of largely Muslim reporters positioned above Damascus Gate. Several suffered head wounds that required medical treatment." The US State Department condemned the "outrageous and unacceptable" violence and racist behaviour, in which Jewish crowds attacked a number of journalists, photographers, and Palestinian residents with sticks, flagpoles and glass bottles. Israeli human rights organization B'Tselem concluded that "Israeli police officers either attacked Palestinians or allowed others to attack them undisturbed." They cited a number of incidents, including one where "a group of marchers, with a police escort, passed by a clothing store and two stalls that remained open, one of the marchers sprayed pepper spray in their direction, while others threw merchandise belonging to one of the stores on the ground. All of this took place in front of police officers who did nothing to prevent this and simply allowed the marchers to continue on their way.

==== During the Gaza war ====
Israeli activist celebrating Jerusalem Day 2025 near Damascus Gate, the lyrics: Listen carefully you Arabs, we don't forgive and the song always remains: "May your village burn down"

In the hours preceding the June 2024 march, the first Jerusalem Day to fall during the Israel-Hamas war, Palestinian freelance photographer Saif Kwasmi and Haaretz journalist Nir Hasson were attacked by youths participating in the march in Jerusalem. Hasson reported that the 2024 march "was one of the most violent and ugliest I have seen – and I have witnessed every single one over the past 16 years … The general spirit was that of revenge. The leading symbol on the marchers' shirts was the Kahanist fist … The most popular minister was Itamar Ben-Gvir". Hasson further reported that in "the morning, hours before the official march set off, groups of Jewish youths" overran the Muslim Quarter, "pushed, cursed, spat, threatened and attacked Palestinian passersby and journalists … intimidating the shopkeepers and residents", then when Palestinians hid away, the youths instead "repeatedly threatened, cursed and pushed" any journalists and photographers. Hasson described that Kwasmi was first attacked by one boy, tried to defend himself, and was then ganged up upon by around ten boys, but to Hasson's knowledge, police made no arrests of Kwasmi's attackers and did not ask anyone to testify regarding the attack on Kwasmi. Israeli police arrested Kwasmi later that day, citing an unrelated report on Kwasmi committing "incitement", and further commented that Kwasmi "is not recognized at all as a journalist with relevant documentation that is valid in Israel". Hasson described being himself attacked by several youths pushing him down and then kicking him until he was saved by Israeli Border Police. Tens of thousands of mostly young, right-wing Israelis participated in the march, but around 60 activists of the Jewish-Palestinian activist group, Standing Together stood between them and Palestinian residents.

The 2026 march was attended by tens of thousands of participants, including Finance Minister Bezalel Smotrich and National Security Minister Itamar Ben-Gvir, and was funded by government ministries and the Jerusalem municipality. Prior to the main procession, Ben-Gvir visited the Al-Aqsa Mosque compound, where he raised an Israeli flag and stated that Israel had "restored sovereignty" over the site. During the event, groups of participants chanted slogans including "Death to Arabs", "May your villages burn", and "Gaza is a graveyard". The majority of Palestinian shopkeepers in the Old City of Jerusalem closed their businesses and remained indoors, while some marchers banged on closed storefronts, threw plastic chairs at a Palestinian merchant, and entered a residential courtyard. Journalists covering the event were also shoved and obstructed from filming by some participants. Thirteen people were arrested or detained. Meanwhile, over 150 activists from the Tag Meir organization handed out 3,000 flowers in a “Flower March” in the Old City and distributed flyers calling for peace, neighborly relations and an apology for the distress caused to traders by the Flag March.

== Anti-Palestinian chants ==
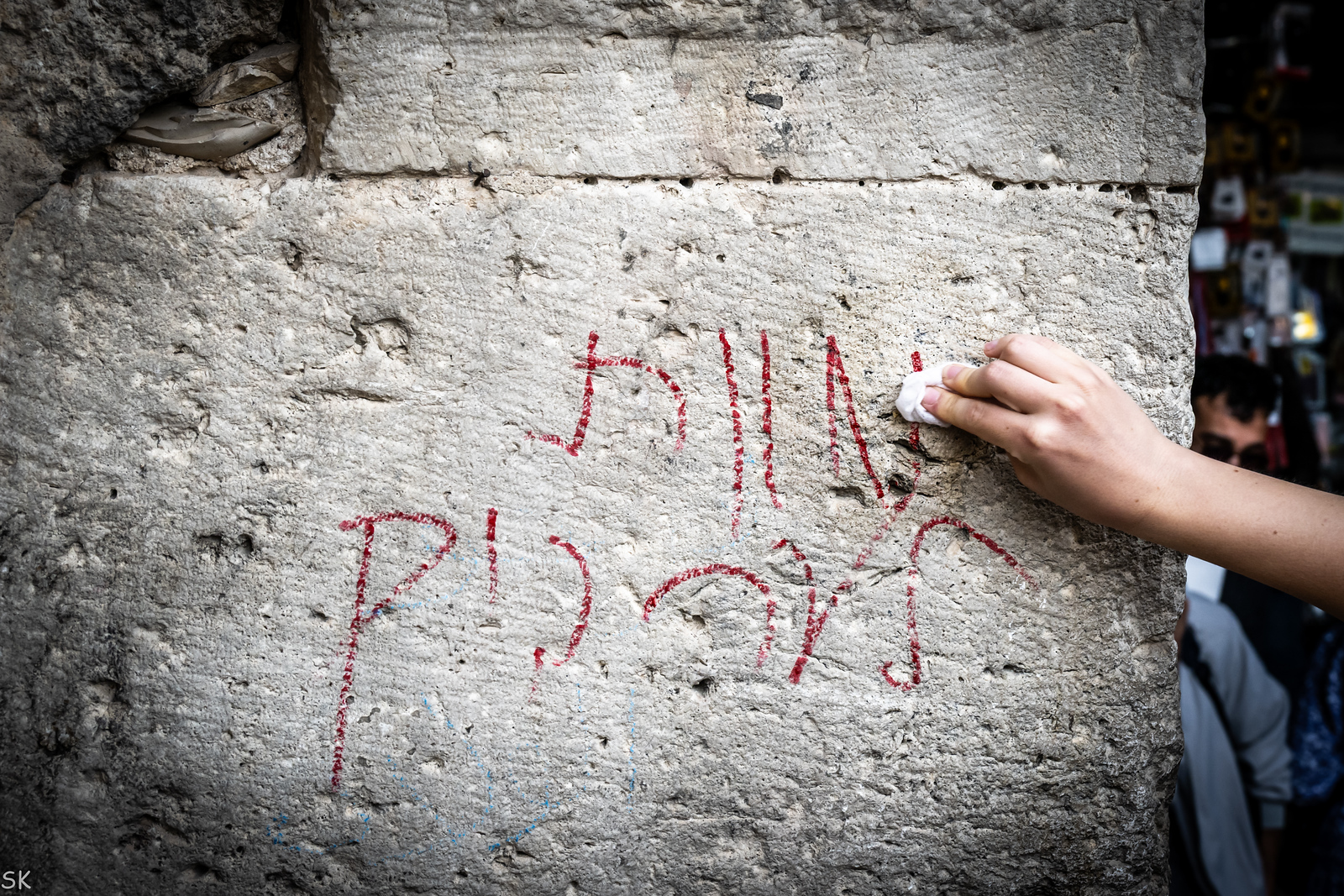
Cleaning a wall from the inscription "Death to Arabs" after the flag parade

Since 2011, Israeli nationalists have made anti-Palestinian chants such as "death to Arabs" (Israeli Hebrew: מָוֶת לָעֲרָבִים, romanized: Mávet la'Aravím) in parades on Jerusalem Day. Other chants include "May Your Village Burn," "Muhammad is dead," "a Jew is a soul, an Arab is a son of a whore," "burn Shu'afat" or "Shu'afat is on fire" in reference to the Palestinian neighborhood in East Jerusalem where a Palestinian boy was kidnapped and set on fire, as well as the Hebrew curse with Biblical origins for enemies of the Jewish people "may their name be erased." According to Nadera Shalhoub-Kevorkian, the Jerusalem Day parade is a "spatialized enactment of power," and in 2015, "over 30,000 young religious and nationalist Israeli Jews rampaged throughout the Old City of OEJ chanting 'Death to Arabs', 'Muhammad is Dead' and other racist slogans, restructuring the sensory experiences of Palestinians in the space."

== See also ==
- Flag flying day
- Flag of Israel
- Jerusalem March
- List of observances set by the Hebrew calendar
- Naksa Day
