= Itamar Ben-Gvir =

Israeli far-right politician (born 1976)

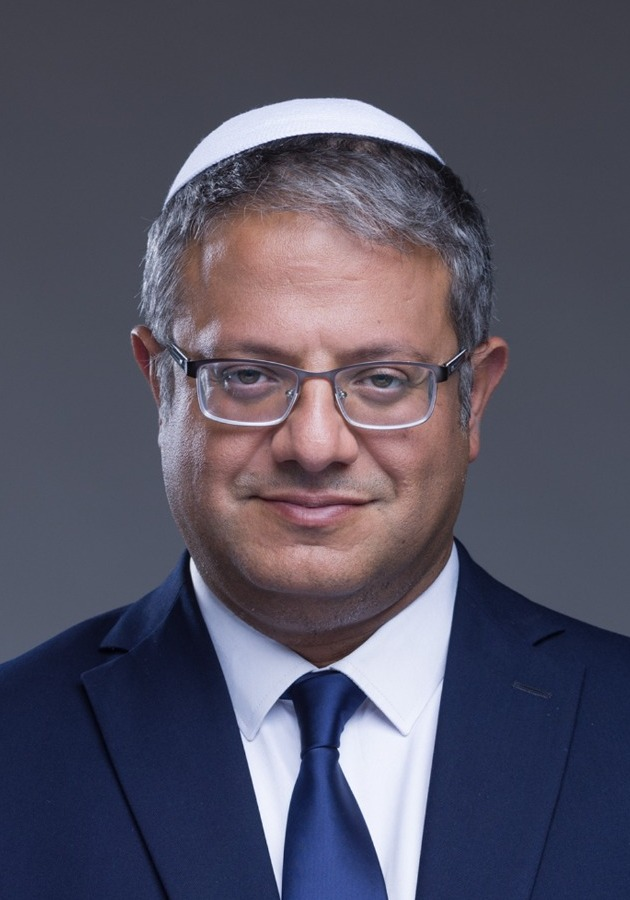
- Ben-Gvir in 2022

Ministerial roles
- 2022–2025: Minister of National Security
- 2025–: Minister of National Security

Faction represented in the Knesset
- 2021–2022: Religious Zionist Party
- 2022–: Otzma Yehudit

Personal details
- Born: 6 May 1976 (age 50) Mevaseret Zion, Israel
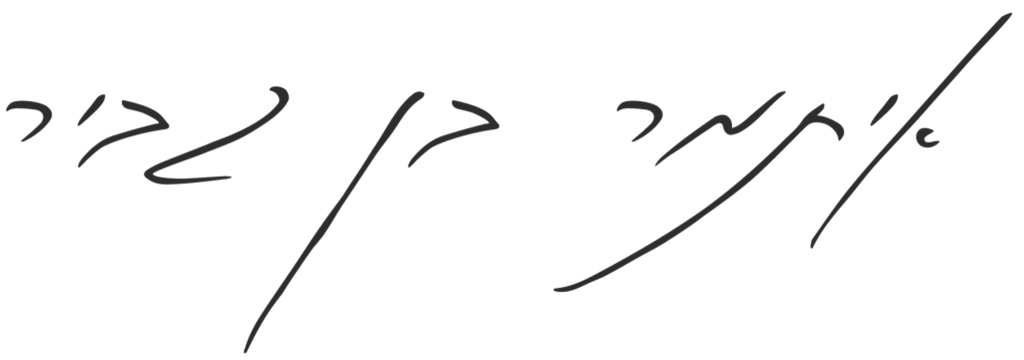
- Signature

Itamar Ben-Gvir (Hebrew: אִיתָמָר בֶּן גְּבִיר; born 6 May 1976) is an Israeli politician and lawyer who has served as the minister of national security since 2022, except for a two-month gap in early 2025. He is the leader of Otzma Yehudit ("Jewish Power"), a far-right, Kahanist and anti-Arab party and is a part of the thirty-seventh government of Israel.

Ben-Gvir is a settler in the Israeli-occupied West Bank; according to the BBC, his "political background lies in Kahanism—a violently racist movement that supports the expulsion of Palestinians from their lands". He has a long history of anti-Arab activism, leading to dozens of indictments and at least eight convictions of crimes including incitement to racism and support for, as well as possession of propaganda of, a terrorist organization (the now-illegal Kach political party). As a lawyer, he is known for defending Jews accused of Jewish extremist terrorism in Israeli courts.

Ben-Gvir is known for being a provocateur and has attracted headlines for a variety of reasons: threatening Prime Minister Yitzhak Rabin on live television in 1995 shortly before his assassination; having had a portrait in his living room of Baruch Goldstein, a Jewish terrorist and mass murderer; calling in 2019 for the expulsion of Arab citizens of Israel who are not loyal to the state; inciting violent clashes between Jewish settlers and Palestinians in the East Jerusalem neighbourhood of Sheikh Jarrah in 2021; and making highly controversial visits to the Temple Mount, where the al-Aqsa Mosque is located, in 2023 and 2024.

On 18 January 2025, it was reported that Ben-Gvir intended to resign from his ministerial position in response to the approval and implementation of the three-phase Gaza war ceasefire deal. He resigned on 19 January 2025. Two months later, it was announced that he and other party members would return to the government after an agreement was reached, following the continuation of airstrikes in Gaza.

== Early life ==
Itamar Ben-Gvir was born on 6 May 1976, in Mevaseret Zion. His father, Tzadok Ben-Gvir, worked at a gasoline company and dabbled in writing, while his mother, Shoshana Ben-Gvir, joined the Irgun at age 14 and was arrested by the British, later becoming a stay-at-home mother. Ben-Gvir was of Iraqi Jewish and Kurdish Jewish descent, and his family were considered Mizrahi Jews. Both of his paternal grandparents were born in Iraq, although his father was born in Jerusalem. His mother was born in Iraqi Kurdistan and immigrated to Mandatory Palestine as a teenager. His father, whose surname was originally Hanan (חאנן), had adopted the Hebrew surname of Ben-Gvir. Although his family was relatively secular and moderate, he was radicalized during the First Intifada, having first joined a youth movement affiliated with the right-wing anti-Arab party Moledet, and later the youth movement of the even more radical Kach and Kahane Chai parties, which were designated as terrorist and banned by the Israeli government. He had also identified with the baal teshuva movement. Ben-Gvir became the youth coordinator of Kach, and claimed to have been detained at the age of 14. By the time he reached the age of 18, his reputation as a teen provocateur had disqualified him from serving in the Israel Defense Forces (IDF).

Ben-Gvir was active in protests against the Oslo Accords in the 1990s, and came to public attention for the first time in 1995, when he appeared on television brandishing a Cadillac hood ornament stolen from Prime Minister Yitzhak Rabin's car, and declared: "We got to his car, and we'll get to him too." Several weeks later, Rabin was assassinated by right-wing extremist Yigal Amir.

Ben-Gvir continued to be associated with the Kahanist movement; Otzma Yehudit is considered Kach's ideological successor. However, when forming the Otzma Yehudit party, he claimed that it would not be a Kach, Kahane Chai or splinter group. He carried out a series of far-right activities that have resulted in dozens of indictments. In a November 2015 interview, he claimed to have been indicted 53 times. In most cases, the charges were thrown out of court. In 2007, however, he was convicted for incitement to racism and supporting a terrorist organization. Following a bombing in Jerusalem, Ben-Gvir had chanted "Death to Arabs" and held signs reading "Expel the Arab enemy" and "Rabbi Kahane was right: The Arab MKs are a fifth column." Ben-Gvir has been convicted of at least eight charges.

== Legal career ==
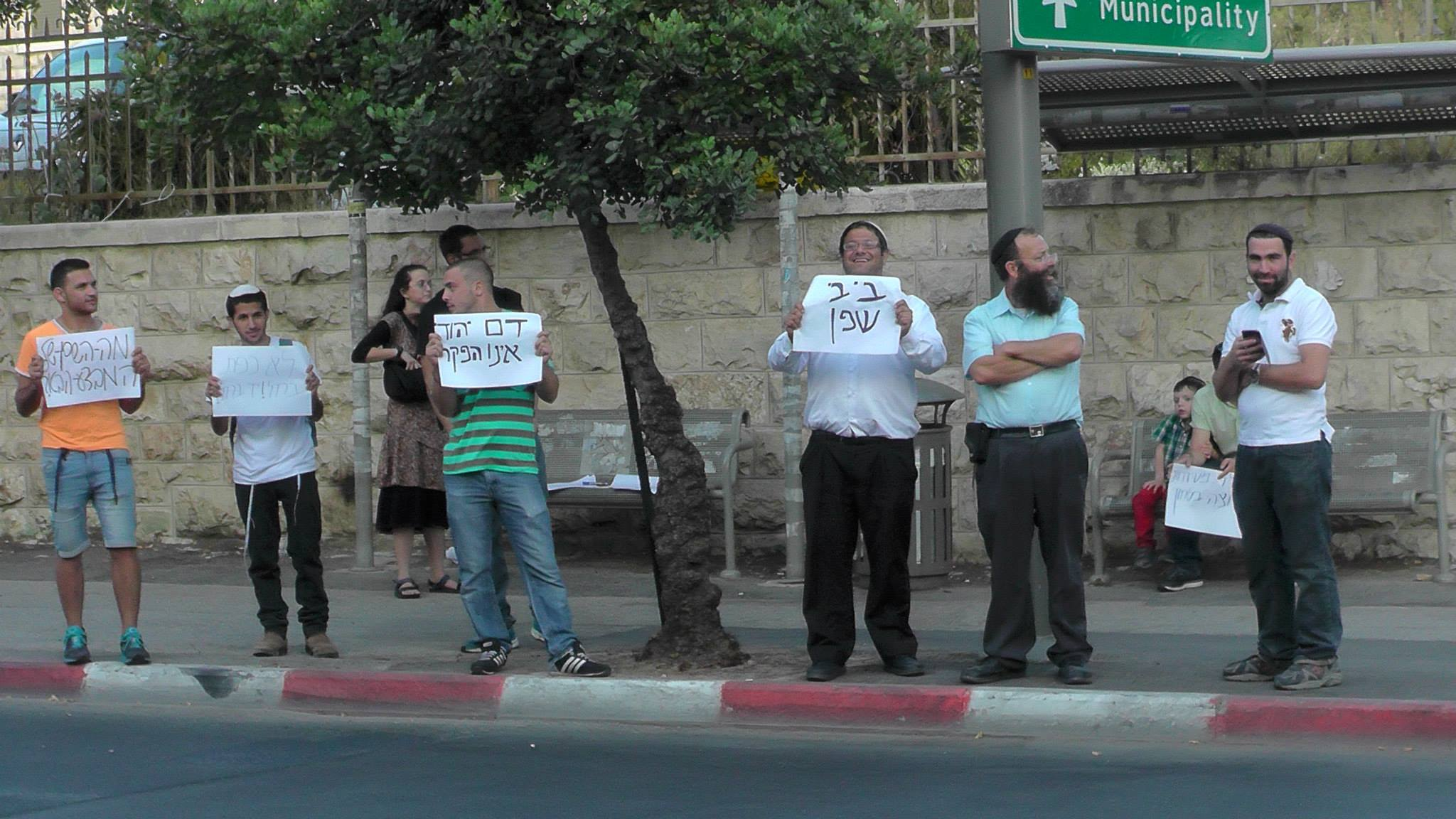
Ben-Gvir demonstrating against the cease fire on Gaza during the 2014 Gaza War

Ben-Gvir sometimes represented himself during his many indictments, and at the suggestion of several judges, he decided to study law. Ben-Gvir studied law at the Ono Academic College. At the end of his studies, the Israel Bar Association blocked him from taking the bar exam on grounds of his criminal record. Ben-Gvir claimed the decision was politically motivated. After a series of appeals, this decision was overturned, but it was ruled that Ben-Gvir would first have to settle three criminal cases in which he was charged at the time. After being acquitted in all three cases on charges including holding an illegal gathering and disturbing a civil servant, Ben-Gvir was allowed to take the exam. He passed the written and oral examinations, and was granted a license to practice law.

As a lawyer, Ben-Gvir has represented a series of far-right Jewish activists suspected of terrorism and hate crimes, some of which are colloquially known as hilltop youth. He has stated that his work representing them is ideologically motivated. Notable clients include Kahanist activist Benzi Gopstein and two teenagers charged in the Duma arson attack, in which three people died, including a 18 month baby. The Israeli newspaper Haaretz described Ben-Gvir as the "go-to man" for Jewish extremists facing legal trouble, and reported that his client list "reads like a 'Who's Who' of suspects in Jewish terror cases and hate crimes in Israel". Ben-Gvir has also represented Lehava, a far-right Israeli anti-assimilation organization founded by Gopstein which is active in opposing Jewish intermarriage with non-Jews, and has sued the Jerusalem Waqf.

== Political career ==
=== Early political activity and Knesset elections ===
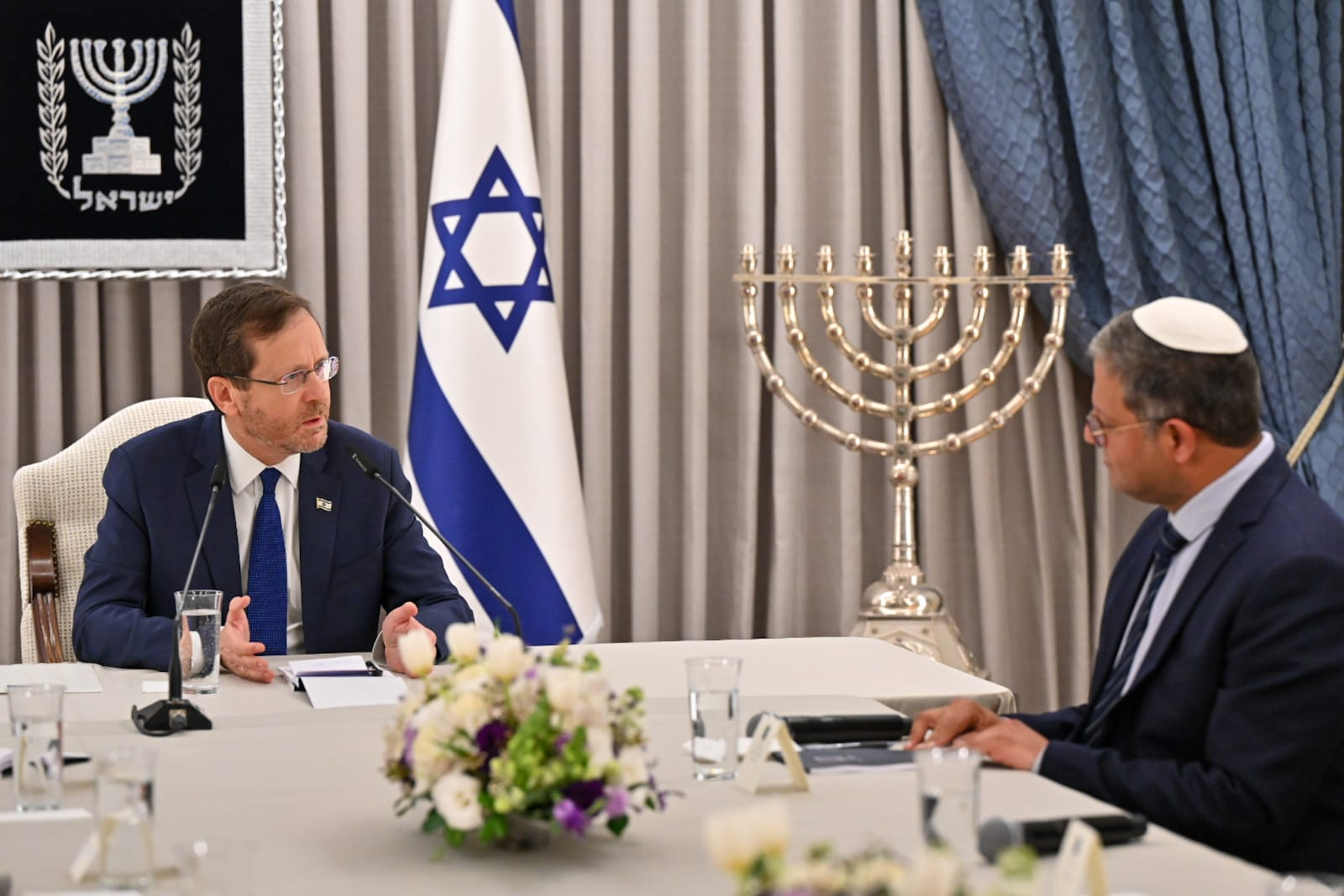
Ben-Gvir with Israeli president Isaac Herzog, 10 November 2022

Ben-Gvir was the parliamentary assistant in the 18th Knesset for Michael Ben-Ari. In the 2013 Israeli legislative election, he was placed fifth on the Otzma Leyisrael list, but failed to enter Knesset since the party did not pass the election threshold. On 23 July 2017, he was part of the leadership of a protest that included dozens of people outside of the prime minister's office in Jerusalem. The protest was held by both Lehava and Otzma Yehudit ('Jewish Power').

Ben-Gvir had planned to run for a seat in the Knesset in the 2019 Israeli legislative election in the first slot of a combined Noam/Otzma Yehudit electoral list, though the two parties split over Otzma's inclusion of a secular candidate on the combined list (which Noam disagreed with). Ben-Gvir was in the third seat of a joint list that included Otzma Yehudit, Noam and the Religious Zionist Party that ran in the 2021 Israeli legislative election. He was elected to the Knesset as the alliance won six seats.

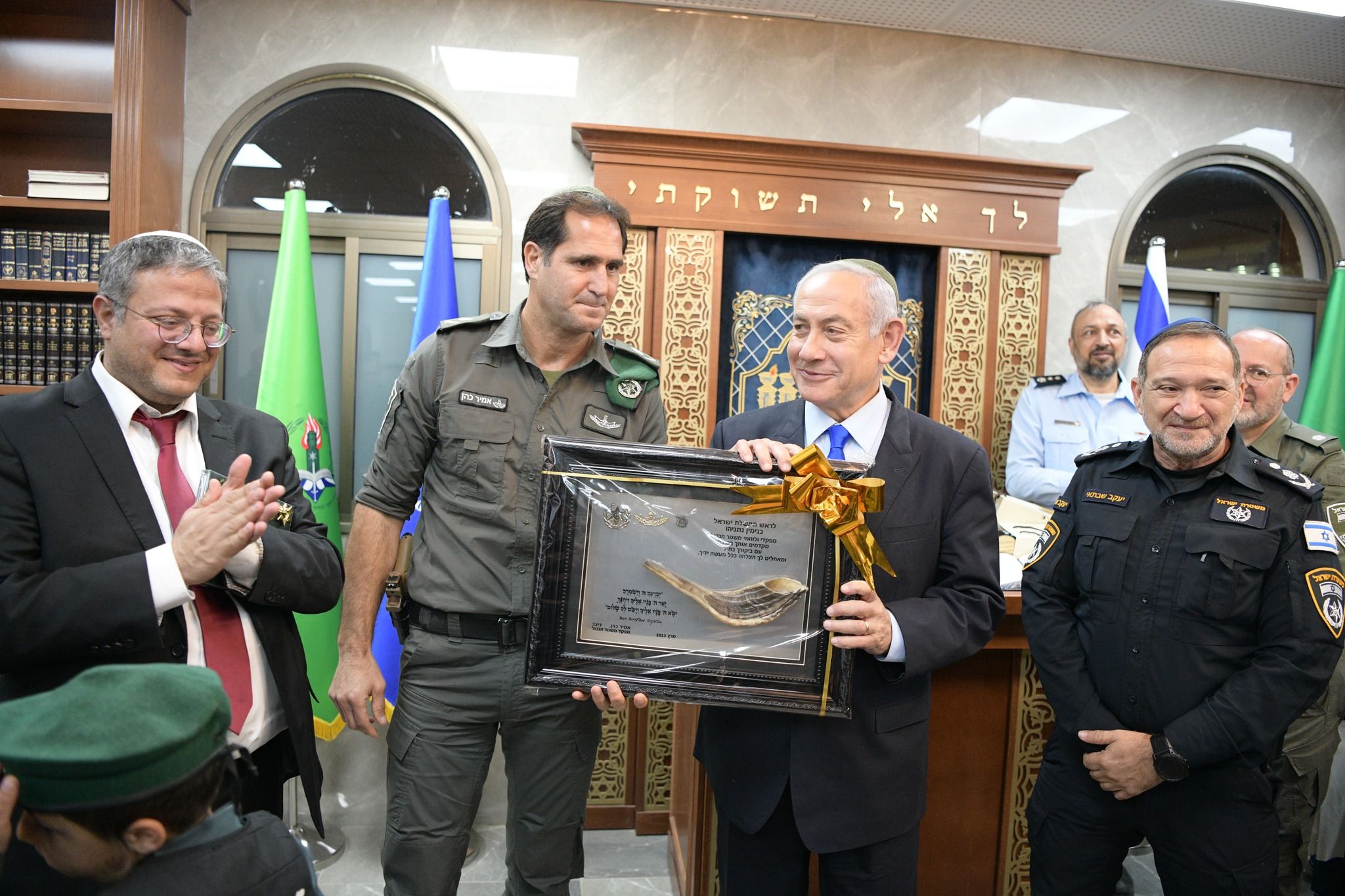
Ben-Gvir with Israeli prime minister Benjamin Netanyahu, 6 March 2023

In the 2022 Israeli legislative election, Otzma Yehudit again ran as part of a combined list with the Religious Zionist Party, led by Bezalel Smotrich. This combined list was strongly encouraged by Benjamin Netanyahu, who publicly posted a video address warning against the parties running independently and risking falling below the 3.25% electoral threshold needed to get a seat. The prospect of Ben-Gvir and Smotrich entering government was highly controversial. Yaakov Katz, the then editor of The Jerusalem Post, warned that such a government would work "toward the same goal of destroying Israeli democracy." The combined list received the 3rd most votes in the 25th Knesset, a total of 14 seats out of 120. Ben-Gvir and his party entered a Netanyahu-led government. The president of Israel, Isaac Herzog was heard on a hot mic saying that the entire world was worried about Ben-Gvir becoming a minister. It was reported in late November 2022 that Ben-Gvir would head the newly created National Security Ministry, whose duties would include overseeing the Israel Border Police in the West Bank.

=== Minister of National Security ===
As minister, Ben-Gvir worked to loosen Israel's firearm-ownership regulations. His office stated in August 2025 that reforms had led to 230,000 new firearm licenses. He also encouraged the creation of the National Guard of Israel.

On 26 January 2024 he accused the International Court of Justice of antisemitism following its ruling on the case South Africa v. Israel. He was the subject of a foiled assassination plot by seven Arab citizens of Israel and four Palestinians from the West Bank in 2024.

The Arab community in Israel has seen a significant increase in violence and organized crime, including a rise in gang-related murders in recent years, in which both the victims and perpetrators are predominantly Arab Israeli citizens. A report by The Abraham Initiatives highlighted that 244 Arab community members were killed in Israel in 2023, more than double the previous year's count. The report attributed this surge in homicides directly to National Security Minister Itamar Ben Gvir's inadequate response to surging criminal violence in Arab Israeli towns.

On 30 March 2026, the bill approving the application of the death penalty by hanging for Palestinians in the West Bank convicted of terrorism, which Ben-Gvir supported since the beginning of his time as National Security minister, was passed by the Knesset. Speaking after the passage of the bill, Ben-Gvir said "This is a day of justice for the victims, a day of deterrence for the enemies. No more revolving doors for terrorists, only a clear decision. Those who choose terror choose death. Those who believe do not fear. The people of Israel live!" Ben-Gvir has said that death penalty legislation in the United States served as a model during the drafting of the Death Penalty for Terrorists Law. Speaking about the condemnations of the law which had been made by foreign ministers from Europe, Ben-Gvir said "I hope that they won’t need to undergo an October 7 to understand why the law is important," and that “No one should try to teach Israel its morals".

=== Resignation and return to government ===
On 16 January 2025, Ben-Gvir held a press conference in which he announced his intention to resign as minister and withdraw Otzma Yehudit from the coalition if the government accepted the three-phase ceasefire proposal. The proposal was accepted, and Ben-Gvir subsequently resigned alongside his party's ministers when the ceasefire went into effect on 19 January 2025. His term expired on 21 January. Otzma Yehudit has stated its intention to rejoin the governing coalition if the deal does not result in a permanent ceasefire. His party announced their intention to return to the government on 18 March 2025. The cabinet approved Ben-Gvir's reappointment that night and it was approved by the Knesset the following day.

Ben-Gvir spearheaded the attempted construction of a crocodile-filled moat around Ktzi'ot Prison in July 2026. However, construction was halted on 2 August due to a legal challenge by animal rights activists. Middle East Eye reported at the time that the project was "the latest in a series of measures proposed by [Ben-Gvir] to make detention conditions for Palestinian prisoners even more unbearable".

On 16 August 2026 Ben-Gvir appeared on the 8 October podcast hosted by Rom Braslavski. During the podcast Ben-Gvir publicly criticised Netanyahu and called for further escalation in Gaza, suggesting targeted killing of Palestinians "not worthy of life".

=== International sanctions, travel bans and legal actions ===
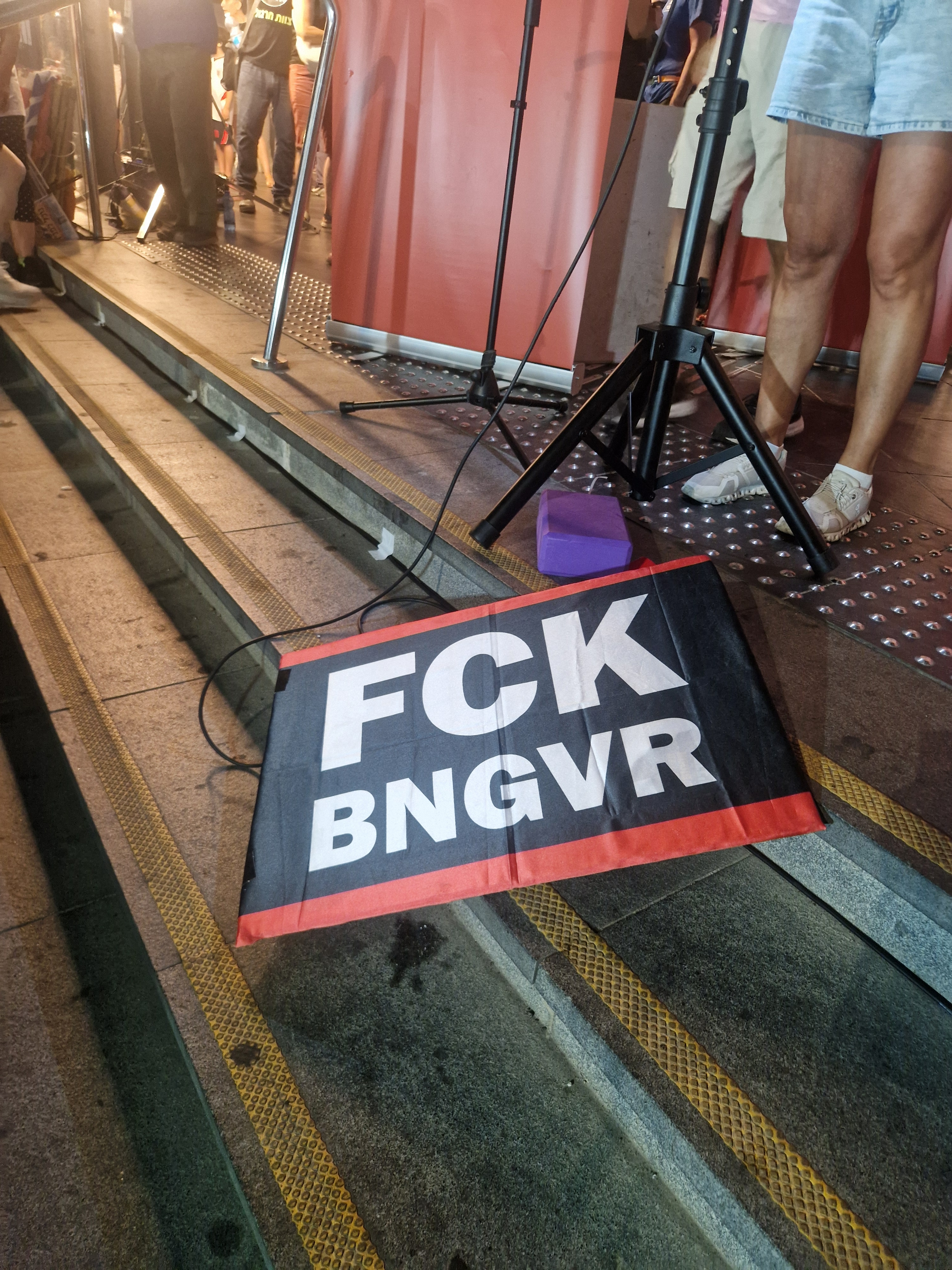
"FCK BNGVR" is a popular sign held by protesters in Israel against Ben-Gvir and the Netanyahu government.

On 10 June 2025, the governments of the United Kingdom, Canada, Australia, New Zealand, and Norway announced that they would impose travel bans and freeze Ben-Gvir's assets alongside Finance Minister Bezalel Smotrich, accusing them of inciting settler violence against Palestinians in the West Bank. The decision was criticized by the two ministers and the United States. In July 2025, he was also sanctioned by the governments of Slovenia and the Netherlands. In September 2025, the government of Spain sanctioned him.

The European Union's foreign policy chief, Josep Borrell, has requested that some Israeli ministers be sanctioned by the 27 member states of the bloc for their 'hate messages' towards Palestinians. He did not specify the ministers, but recently he has publicly criticized Ben-Gvir and Smotrich for statements he described as 'sinister'.

On 7 November 2025, the Chief Public Prosecutor's Office of Turkey charged Ben-Gvir and 36 other Israeli officials with committing genocide and crimes against humanity in Gaza and issued an arrest warrant for him.

On 23 May 2026, France banned Ben-Gvir from the nation, citing what it called his "unspeakable" behavior against French and European 2026 Global Sumud Flotilla activists. Poland imposed a five-year entry ban on Ben-Gvir over his treatment of detained activists.

The following month, Ben-Gvir was banned from entering Ireland, citing behavior against Gaza flotilla activists and anti-Palestinian statements.

=== Security threats ===
In January 2022, his level of security was increased. Due to frequent death threats, Ben-Gvir is accompanied by multiple security guards in public, and extra security measures are taken to ensure his safety.

In September 2025, Shin Bet announced that it had worked with the IDF and Israeli police to uncover and thwart a plot by a cell of operatives in Hebron to assassinate Ben-Gvir using an explosive drone during a visit Ben-Gvir had planned to the Cave of the Patriarchs. The cell had been funded by Hamas officials based in Turkey.

In May 2025, Ben-Gvir and his wife were attacked by anti-Zionist Haredi Jews of the Neturei Karta while they were visiting in Beit Shemesh when he called on the police to report Palestinian flags painted on the side of a building.

== Political views and public statements ==
=== Kahanism and anti-Arab views ===
On 25 February 2019, Ben-Gvir said that Arab citizens of Israel who were not loyal to Israel "must be expelled".

In August 2023 Ben-Gvir stated, "My right, and my wife's and my children's right, to get around on the roads in Judea and Samaria is more important than the right to movement for Arabs". These comments were condemned by the Palestinian Authority (PA) and the US State Department as racist. The PA condemned "the racist and heinous remarks by Israel's fascist minister Itamar Ben Gvir, which only confirms Israel's apartheid regime of Jewish supremacy and racial terror against the Palestinian people".

Noted Israeli sociologist Eva Illouz has said Ben-Gvir represents "Jewish fascism".

=== Palestinians and Arab citizens of Israel ===
In November 2023 he declared that "when they say that Hamas needs to be eliminated, it also means those who sing, those who support and those who distribute candy, all of these are terrorists." On 1 January 2024, Ben-Gvir said that the war with Hamas presented an "opportunity to concentrate on encouraging the migration of the residents of Gaza." He has stated that "We cannot withdraw from any territory we are in in the Gaza Strip. Not only do I not rule out Jewish settlement there, I believe it is also an important thing". When, in May 2024, a number of European countries recognised a Palestinian state, Ben-Gvir entered the Al-Aqsa Mosque compound and said "We will not allow any surrender that would even include a declaration of a Palestinian state" and that the mosque site belongs "only to the State of Israel".

Ben-Gvir has claimed credit for delaying ceasefire negotiations during the Gaza war. In July 2026 he said, regarding negotiations, "You only talk with Nazis through the crosshairs...the only solution in Gaza...is encouraging emigration and destroying Hamas."

==== Call to kill Gazans ====
In August 2026, he called for killing “30 to 40” people in Gaza every night while speaking to a former hostage, Rom Brasalavski, on a podcast. Ben-Gvir clarified that the killings should go beyond those who "pose an immediate threat", stating that "there are people there who are not worthy of life... they're not even people."

His statement was condemned by the Chancellor of Germany, Friedrich Merz, stating that Ben-Gvir's statement was "inhumane", "unacceptable" and a violation of international law. Jean-Noël Barrot, France's foreign minister, also condemned Ben-Gvir's remarks, calling them "intolerable" and "inhumane". United Nations secretary-general António Guterres called the remarks as "appaling", "dehumanizing", "outrageous", and "dangerous". Guterres' spokesman, Stéphane Dujarric, called his remarks as "abhorrent" and "scandalous".

=== Temple Mount ===
Ben-Gvir has led several visits to the Temple Mount as an activist and member of Knesset, as well as contentious marches through Jerusalem's Old City Muslim Quarter. On 3 January 2023, he visited the Temple Mount as national security minister, which prompted a wave of international criticism from the United States, European Union, and Arab countries including Jordan, Egypt, Saudi Arabia and the United Arab Emirates, who characterised his visit as provocative and called on Israel to respect the status quo of holy sites. On 13 August 2024, he led a group of Jewish worshippers to the compound on the occasion of Tisha B'Av, an annual day of fasting in Judaism. Against convention, several Jews were seen praying and prostrating themselves without being challenged by police who were present. This caused wide outrage in Israel as well as internationally, and resulted in contradictory statements made by prime minister Netanyahu's office and Ben-Gvir himself about whether this indicated a formal change in Israeli policy. At the urging of Jerusalem mayor Moshe Lion, five senior rabbis issued a video statement in Hebrew, with Arabic subtitles, stating that it is strictly forbidden for Jews to enter the compound, and called for calm.

=== Statements on regional conflicts ===
Avatar of Itamar Ben-Gvir

Itamar Ben-Gvir
(@itamarbengvir)
tweeted:

Hebrew:

על כל דמעה של אמא ישראלית, אלף אמהות לבנוניות צריכות לבכות. לבנון כולה צריכה לבעור!

עם כל הכבוד לאמריקאים, ישראל חייבת להבהיר לעולם כולו שדם בנינו וביטחון אזרחנו איננו הפקר. לבנון כולה צריכה לבעור. חובתנו העליונה היא להגן על אזרחי ישראל ועל חיילי צה״ל, והמחויבות הזו קודמת לכל שיקול אחר.

אמרתי לראש הממשלה, גם בישיבות בינינו: על כל דמעה של אמא ישראלית, אלף אימהות לבנוניות צריכות לבכות.

מספיק עם הפינג־פונג. במזרח התיכון לא מנצחים בתגובות מדודות ובהכלה - צריך להשתגע. למחוק. להכריע את הטרור.

Translation:

For every tear of an Israeli mother, a thousand Lebanese mothers must weep. All of Lebanon must burn! With all due respect to the Americans, Israel must make it clear to the entire world that the blood of our sons and the security of our citizens are not forfeit. All of Lebanon must burn. Our supreme duty is to protect the citizens of Israel and the soldiers of the IDF, and this commitment takes precedence over every other consideration. I told the Prime Minister, even in our private meetings: For every tear of an Israeli mother, a thousand Lebanese mothers must weep. Enough with the ping-pong. In the Middle East, you don’t win with measured responses and restraint—you need to go berserk. To obliterate. To crush the terror.

19 June 2026

In July 2025, amid the Druze insurgency, Ben-Gvir publicly urged for the assassination of Syrian president Ahmed al-Sharaa, labeling him the "head of the snake" and insisting that "the only thing that can be done is to eliminate al-Julani." During the same month, Ben-Gvir, alongside Bezalel Smotrich, was declared persona non grata by Slovenia and the Kingdom of the Netherlands, banning him from entering those countries.

In November 2025, at an Otzma Yehudit party meeting, Ben-Gvir advocated for the assassinations of officials of the Palestinian Authority and the arrest of Palestinian president Mahmoud Abbas if the United Nations continued to support recognition of Palestinian statehood.

In June 2026, after the IDF reported that four Israeli soldiers had been killed in southern Lebanon, Ben-Gvir called for Lebanon to "burn" on X.

In July 2026, in response to the Morocco–Spain border incident, Ben-Gvir sarcastically congratulated Spanish Prime Minister Pedro Sánchez and Spain on their "deep commitment to welcoming immigration and 'human diversity'." He also urged Spain to accept Palestinian refugees from Gaza seeking asylum in the country and accused the Spanish government of showing sympathy for Hamas.

== Public controversies ==
=== Baruch Goldstein portrait and "wedding of hate" ===
Having defended the perpetrators of the 2015 Duma arson attack in which vigilante settlers firebombed the home of a family in a Palestinian village, resulting in the deaths of a 18 month baby and its parents, it was controversial that Ben-Gvir, along with Bentzi Gopstein, were seen attending the wedding of a couple related to the perpetrators, which became known as the wedding of hate, in which the weddinggoers could be seen waving rifles, guns and firebombs and even stabbing a photograph of the Palestinian toddler who was killed.

Prior to entering office Ben-Gvir was known to have a portrait in his living room of Israeli-American mass murderer Baruch Goldstein, who massacred 29 Palestinian Muslim worshipers and wounded 125 others in Hebron, in the 1994 Cave of the Patriarchs massacre; he removed the portrait in preparation for the 2020 Israeli legislative election in hope of being allowed to run on the unified right list headed by Naftali Bennett.

=== Sheikh Jarrah and public confrontations ===
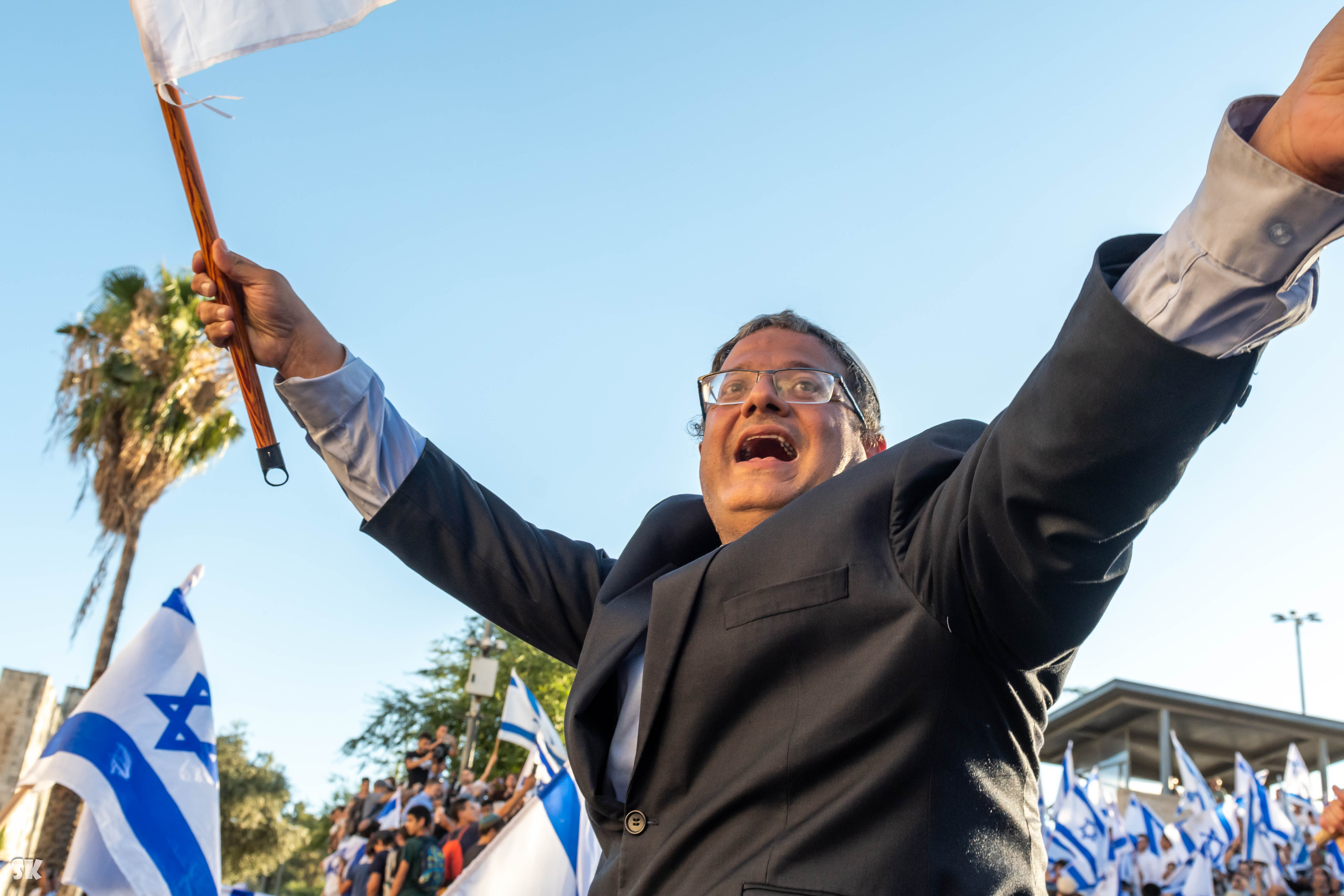
Ben-Gvir in June 2021

In the context of the Sheikh Jarrah controversy, in May 2021, Ben-Gvir set up a makeshift office in the East Jerusalem neighborhood of Sheikh Jarrah, in a show of solidarity with Jewish settlers. Palestinian residents of Sheikh Jarrah have faced potential evictions by Israeli settlers for years. Police Commissioner Kobi Shabtai placed the blame for the outbreak of violent clashes on Ben-Gvir. Ben-Gvir dismantled his office and left the neighbourhood after Netanyahu agreed to increase police presence in the neighbourhood during Ramadan.

In October 2021, Ben-Gvir and Joint List leader Ayman Odeh had a physical confrontation during a visit to the Kaplan Medical Center to see Miqdad Qawasmeh, a Hamas operative who had been on a hunger strike for over three months of his administrative detention. Ben-Gvir was against Qawasmeh being treated in an Israeli hospital, and stated that he had visited to check the detainee's conditions, as well as to "see up close this miracle that a person remains alive despite not eating for several months". As Ben-Gvir attempted to enter Qawasmeh's room, he accused Odeh of being a terrorist for supporting extremists like Qawasmeh. Odeh then struck first, pushing Ben-Gvir, and the pair began to scuffle before being separated by bystanders. Ben-Gvir later filed a complaint against Odeh, claiming that he had "committed a serious criminal act".

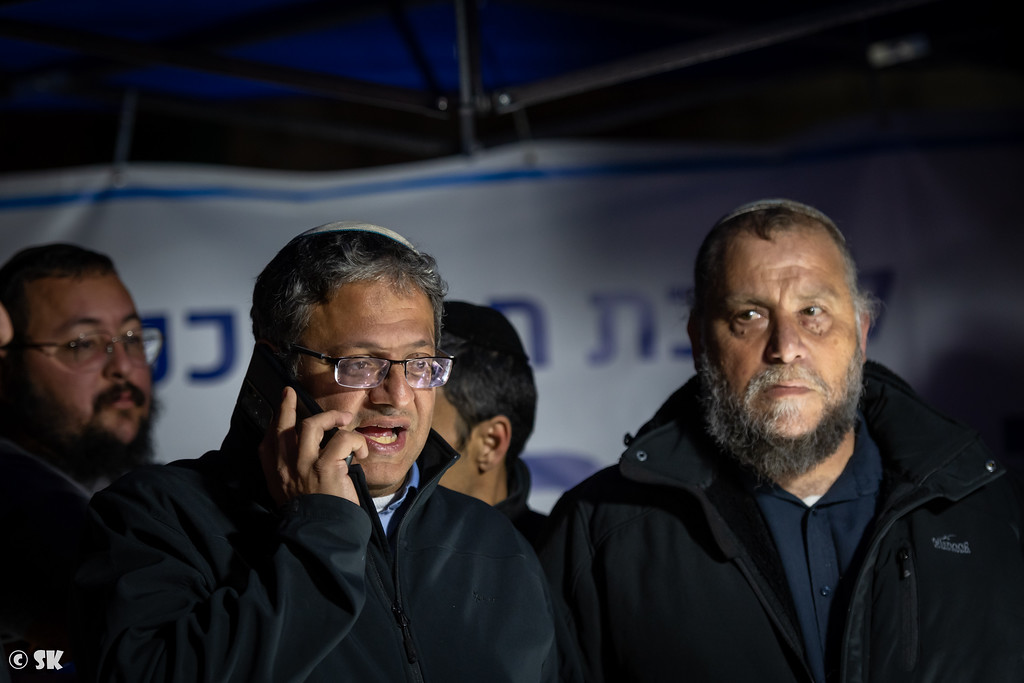
Ben-Gvir and radical right political activist Bentzi Gopstein in Sheikh Jarrah in February 2022

On 13 October 2022, Ben-Gvir took part in clashes in Sheikh Jarrah between Israeli Jewish settlers and local Palestinian residents whilst brandishing a gun, telling the police to shoot at Palestinians throwing stones at the scene, and yelling at them that "We're the landlords here, remember that, I am your landlord." This was a message he later repeated in a tweet on the morning after the 2022 election in his victory tweet.

=== Alleged visit to Iraq ===
On 12 October 2022, Ben-Gvir posted a video on Facebook of him and several others dancing to Kurdish music while celebrating the Seharane. Later, it went viral and became controversial after Arab social media accounts spread the video, falsely accusing Kurds of hosting Ben-Gvir in Iraqi Kurdistan. However, several fact-checkers clarified that it was taken in Israel, also highlighting the difficulties for Israeli citizens to enter Iraq.

=== Gun incidents and policing ===
In December 2021, Ben-Gvir was investigated after a video surfaced of him pulling a handgun on Arab security guards during a parking dispute in the underground garage of the Expo Tel Aviv conference center. The guards asked Ben-Gvir to move his vehicle as he was parked in a prohibited space. He then drew a pistol and brandished it at the guards. Both parties taunted each other, and Ben-Gvir claimed that he felt his life threatened. The guards were unarmed. He was criticized by lawmakers across the aisle, and the incident was investigated.

On 8 January 2023, Ben-Gvir ordered Israeli police to remove Palestinian flags being flown in public, stating the flags symbolized terrorism. In May 2023 the European Union cancelled its diplomatic event for Europe Day in Israel because of the planned participation of Ben-Gvir. It was also reported that, since Netanyahu's 2022 government took power, "official representatives of many European countries—which have strong relations with Israel—have refused to meet Mr Ben-Gvir and his fellow ultranationalist, Finance Minister Bezalel Smotrich."

In October 2023, following the arrest of five Haredi Jews for spitting at Christians outside churches, Ben-Gvir said it was "not a criminal case" following arrests. He said he thought it should be addressed "through instruction and education", rather than justifying arrest. Prior to entering politics, he defended Jews spitting at Christians as "an ancient Jewish custom". After the Hamas attack on Israel in October 2023, Ben-Gvir said that "Israel is experiencing one of the most difficult events in its history. This is not the time for questions, tests and investigations."

=== Treatment of detainees and flotilla activists ===
After the Israeli military police in July 2024 visited Sde Teiman detention camp to detain nine Israeli soldiers suspected of aggravated abuse and forcible sodomy of a Palestinian prisoner, Ben-Gvir condemned the prosecution of the soldiers as "shameful", calling for "the military authorities to back the fighters ... Soldiers need to have our full support".

Various reports indicate that, since the 7 October 2023 Hamas-led attacks on Israel mistreatment has become an integral part of Israel's detention of Palestinian prisoners in Israel which is under Ben-Gvir.

In May 2026, after Israeli forces intercepted the Global Sumud Flotilla, which had been sailing toward Gaza in an attempt to challenge Israel's naval blockade of Gaza, Ben-Gvir released videos showing him taunting detained activists. The footage showed detained activists kneeling with their hands tied behind their backs, while Ben-Gvir called for them to be imprisoned for a long period. The video prompted international condemnation, with officials from the United States, United Kingdom, Canada and Australia criticising the treatment of the detainees, and several countries summoning Israeli diplomatic representatives. Prime Minister Benjamin Netanyahu said Ben-Gvir's conduct was "not in line with Israel's values and norms", while Foreign Minister Gideon Sa'ar described the incident as a "disgraceful display" and said Ben-Gvir had harmed Israel's image.

The foreign ministries of several countries, including France, Canada, the Netherlands, Portugal, Spain, Italy, South Korea, Sweden, Switzerland, Greece, Germany, Poland, Qatar, Slovenia, Turkey, Austria, Belgium, Colombia and the United Kingdom condemned the treatment of the detained activists. On 21 May 2026, Poland's Minister of Internal Affairs and Administration Marcin Kierwiński announced that Poland imposed a five-year entry ban on Ben-Gvir. Similarly, on 23 May 2026, France declared Ben-Gvir persona non grata and banned him from entering its national territory. On 5 June, Ireland's Minister of Justice Jim O'Callaghan introduced travel bans on Ben-Gvir and Smotrich from visiting the country.

== Personal life ==
Ben-Gvir is married to Ayala Nimrodi, a distant relative of Ofer Nimrodi, the former owner of the Maariv daily newspaper. They met around 2002 when Nimrodi was 15 and Ben-Gvir was 26 and married in 2004. Reportedly, the couple visited the grave of Baruch Goldstein, an American-Israeli mass murderer who committed the Cave of the Patriarchs massacre, on their first date. The couple has six children, and they live in the Israeli settlement of Kiryat Arba/Hebron, which is illegal under international law, in the Israeli-occupied West Bank.

Ben-Gvir sued his father's caregiver, a foreign worker from Sri Lanka, for 100,000 NIS after he asked for severance pay from him and his brother, after Ben-Gvir's father died. Ben-Gvir's claim was that his father died because the worker went on a vacation. The court ruled that Ben-Gvir and his brother would have to pay the foreign worker around 100,000 NIS as their father's heirs.

== See also ==
- 2025 pro-Israel mob attack in Brooklyn - Attack against individuals protesting a visit of Ben-Gvir to New York City
