= Bentzi Gopstein =

Israeli political activist

- בנצי גופשטיין
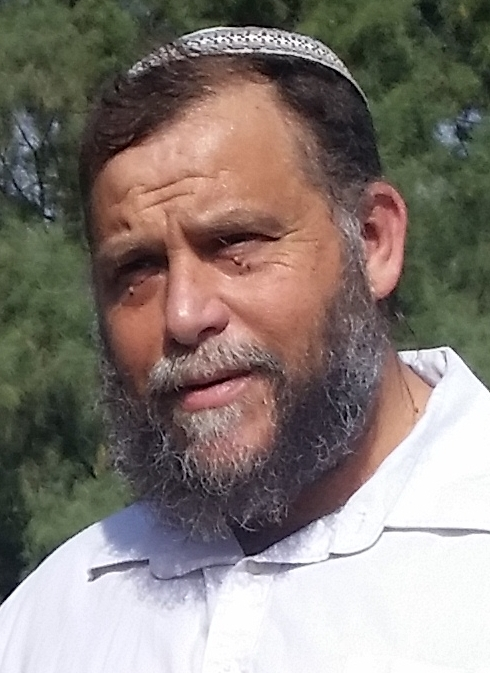
- Gopstein in 2016
- Pronunciation: Ben-Tzion Gopstein
- Born: Ben-Zion Gophstein; 10 September 1969 (age 57)
- Citizenship: American and Israeli
- Occupation: Kahanist activism
- Known for: Founding Lehava
- Political party: Otzma Yehudit
- Movement: Lehava
- Spouse: Anat Gopstein
- Children: 8

Ben-Zion "Bentzi" Gopstein (Hebrew: בן־ציון "בנצי" גופשטיין; born 10 September 1969) is an Israeli activist, a student of Meir Kahane, and founder and director of Lehava ("Flame"), an Israeli far-right and anti-assimilationist organization. He was a member of the Council of Kiryat Arba, an Israeli settlement where Itamar Ben-Gvir, the modern chairman of Otzma Yehudit also resides, between 2010 and 2013. In November 2019, he was indicted on charges of incitement to terrorism, violence, and racism. In April 2024, he was sanctioned by the U.S. Department of State and the European Union.

He is listed with his name spelled in several variations on the sanctions list of the U.S. Department of the Treasury.

== Kahanism ==
Gopstein is a student of Meir Kahane and an adherent of Kahanism, the ideology named for and developed by Kahane and promoted by his banned Kach party.

Kach incited to racism and advocated the expulsion of Arabs from Israel and the Palestinian Territories.

Gopstein praised the 1994 Cave of the Patriarchs massacre committed by fellow Kach member Baruch Goldstein. He has participated in memorials to Kahane.

Shortly after Kahane's 1990 assassination, Gopstein was arrested, and then released, in a case involving the unsolved murder of a Palestinian Arab couple. In 1994, Gopstein was assigned to administrative detention as a result of his involvement with Kahane's then-banned organization.

In 2015, in a tape-recorded talk, Gopstein justified burning down churches based on the religious teachings against idolatry by 12th-century Jewish philosopher and scholar Maimonides. Later that year, he advocated expelling Christians from Israel and banning celebration of Christmas there.

In 2017, Gopstein and Itamar Ben Gvir sued journalist Yoaz Hendel who called them draft-dodgers saying they wanted to join the IDF but the army "... did not want two guys who it was feared would try to stir up unrest among soldiers and turn them into extreme right-wingers like themselves. They were known to be trouble-makers and the IDF did not want to mess with them".

== Hemla ==
Gopstein has served as public relations director of Hemla ("Mercy"), a publicly funded non-profit. For many years, Hemla focused on "saving the daughters of Israel" from mixed marriages with Arab men, and received up to $175,000 each year from the state between 2005 and 2013. Part of the public funding went to Gopstein's salary. While some considered Hemla to be focused on keeping Jewish women from dating non-Jewish men, Gopstein described the charter of the Hemla in an interview with Haaretz:

A few years ago, it was more the issue of girls with Arabs, but today, that's less important - it's more a concern for Haredi girls with all kinds of problems. For Haredi girls, [the Hemla hostel] is the only place there is. They don't get along with the family, there's incest, things like that ... not necessarily Arabs, and not assimilation. This is the place for Haredi girls who can't remain at home."

== Lehava ==
Gopstein serves as head of Lehava, an anti-assimilation organization. It is dedicated to preventing personal, romantic, or business relationships between Jews and non-Jews, particularly Arabs. Lehava's activities are documented in a recent report titled "Racism and Gender in Israel" by the Israel Religious Action Center and other groups active against racism. In 2011, Lehava plastered posters in ultra-Orthodox neighborhoods of Jerusalem deploring a supermarket chain that employed Palestinians. The slogan of the fliers was, "Do you want your grandson to be called Ahmad Ben Sarah?" The group began distributing "kosher certificates" to businesses that did not employ Arabs to encourage discrimination against non-Jews. In 2012, Lehava distributed fliers warning Palestinian men not to date Jewish women. In addition to opposing interfaith marriages, and promoting discrimination against Palestinians and Arabs in employment, Lehava has also encouraged Israelis to report to the organization the names of Jews who rent to Arabs so that they can be named and publicly shamed.

A group of anti-racist organizations petitioned Israel's Supreme Court against the state attorney, Lehava, and Gopstein. According to the petition, Gopstein had, in addition to promoting discrimination against Palestinians and other Arabs, praised a group of Jewish youths who attacked Palestinians in Jerusalem, leaving one victim unconscious and hospitalized. The court case is pending.

In 2014, three members of Lehava were arrested, and indicted in 2014 for committing arson and spray-painting anti-Arab graffiti at the Max Rayne Hand in Hand: Center for Jewish Arab Education in Israel (Yad B'Yad) Bilingual School in Jerusalem. Gopstein, along with several other group members, was arrested shortly thereafter for incitement. In the same year, Gopstein openly criticized Yair Netanyahu, son of then-prime minister, Benjamin Netanyahu, for dating a Gentile woman of Nordic descent.

In January 2015, Channel 2 reported that Defense Minister Moshe Ya'alon may be preparing to categorize Lehava as a terrorist organization. Ya'alon was reported to have ordered the Shin Bet and the Defense Ministry to assemble evidence required for the classification. The arson incident received international attention. Gopstein issued a statement harshly critical of Ya'alon:

I suggest that [Ya'alon] aim to outlaw the Islamist Movement and then preoccupy itself with an anti-assimilation group... Instead of taking care of an enemy of Israel, the defense minister is trying to win over votes from the Left [by] taking on Lehava. The group acts to save the daughters of Israel [Jewish women] and deserves the Israel Prize.

A journalist participated in Lehava undercover and reported on Gopstein's leadership. Liat Bar-Stav described a meeting that Gopstein led for his followers, in which he said to them:

Some 45 years ago, Rabbi Kahane said, shouted, and cried out that the enemies within us are a cancer, and that, if we don't take this cancer and get rid of it, we won't continue to exist. Unfortunately, this dangerous cancer of co-existence has metastasized everywhere. There are various ministers in the government who are encouraging co-existence, who are giving them jobs, allowing them into the hi-tech world, allowing them to become doctors.

As the crowd responded with booing and cheering, Gopstein continued:

The cancer we spoke about in the beginning has offshoots in the Knesset of Israel too. Thirty years ago, Rabbi Kahana stood up in the Knesset and took out a hangman's noose for traitors, a noose for the Arab MK who was there. It's not a threat, it's a promise, the rabbi said when attacked for doing so. So, this is what I want to wish [former MK Azmi] Bishara on behalf of all of you. - (Waving a noose) - Your day will come, Azmi! We are waiting for the Israeli government to come and hang you from the tallest tree! Azmi, only thanks to Rabbi Meir Kahane will we make sure you are hanged one day.

Before his Facebook account was permanently disabled, it had doctored images of Arab Israeli Knesset members who appear to be hanged by the neck.

=== Anti-LGBT activity ===
In the past, the organization sought to disrupt and protest the Jerusalem Pride Parade, in order to fight what Gopstein called "LGBT terrorism", stating that the LGBT and alternative community "are bringing disaster to Israel". In 2023, the Times of Israel captioned a photo of him as "Extremist, far-right rabbi Bentzi Gopstein shouts 'it’s not pride, it’s an abomination' at the protest against the Jerusalem Pride Parade, June 1, 2023."

=== Advocacy outside Israel ===
Gopstein wrote a letter to Facebook founder and CEO Mark Zuckerberg protesting both Zuckerberg's marriage to a non-Jewish woman, as well as the Palestinian use of Facebook. He complained, "In Israel, too, assimilation is hitting us quite a bit because of your Facebook, where every Muhammad is 'CitySlicker', and every Yosef calls himself 'Prince Charming'".

In 2018, Gopstein started a fund-raiser to raise money to sue Facebook for censorship.

== Attitude towards Christians ==
Gopstein has called for the incineration of Christian churches. The discussion centered on whether Maimonides's ruling to eliminate idol worship was valid also for modern times. On the Haredi website Kooker, Gopstein published an article in December 2015 calling for the suppression of Christmas celebrations in Israel and the expulsion of Christians, whom he likened to vampires. Calling the Catholic Church "the deadly enemy of the Jewish people for centuries", he wrote, "Their missionaries prowl for prey in Jerusalem." In response, Israeli groups have asked he be investigated for incitement.

=== Reactions ===
In 2016, the Anti-Defamation League (ADL) sent a letter to the Israeli government, encouraging action to be taken to curb Gopstein. In the letter to Attorney General Avichai Mendelblit, the ADL said that Gopstein has referred to Christians as "bloodsucking vampires", condoned burning Christian churches, and that his Facebook page includes anti-LGBT posts, as well as ones the ADL calls "extremely abusive, racist, inflammatory, and violent".

The Reform Center for Religion and Policy petitioned Mandelblit again in 2018. During a hearing, however, the petition was withdrawn by suggestion of multiple Supreme Court justices.

== Election bans ==
In the run-up to the September 2019 Knesset election, Gopstein boycotted a hearing of the High Court of Justice on whether Otzma Yehudit should be allowed on the ballot. He claimed that "the judges already made their decision" and would overturn the Law of Return if given the chance.

== Indictment ==
In late November 2019, nine years after an initial complaint had been filed by the Israel Movement for Reform and Progressive Judaism regarding his behavior, Gopstein was indicted for incitement to violence, racism, and support for terrorism on the basis of a series of statements he made over a five-year period from 2012 to 2017, such as praising the mass murderer Baruch Goldstein, defending the actions of youths involved in the Zion Square assault, calling Arabs as a cancer, and stating that there was no shortage of Arabs who deserved to be beaten up. He also declared that "full redemption of the country" would not come until the "cancerous growth" known as the Al-Aqsa mosque was destroyed. The indictment was approved by the Israeli Attorney General. Gopstein responded by declaring he would persist in campaigning against Jewish-Arab coexistence, and asserted that the indictment was tantamount to state-sponsored persecution.

== Personal life ==
Gopstein is married to Anat Gopstein, and has eight children.

== International sanctions ==
On 19 April 2024, Gopstein was targeted in the third round of sanctions imposed by the Biden administration, which are aimed at clamping down on settler violence in the West Bank. On 22 April 2024, Gopstein "discovered the practical effect of the measure when he went to fill up on gas for his car on Sunday and was informed by the electronic card reader, "Due to your inclusion on the U.S. Treasury sanctions list, we have been forced to block your [credit] card."

Also on 19 April 2024, the U.S. Department of the Treasury "imposed sanctions on two entities for their roles in establishing fundraising campaigns on behalf of Yinon Levi... and David Chai Chasdai... two violent extremists who were sanctioned on February 1, 2024 in connection with violence in the West Bank. The fundraising campaigns established by Mount Hebron Fund for Levi and by Shlom Asiraich for Chasdai generated the equivalent of $140,000 and $31,000, respectively.“ On August 3, 2024, Chasdai, together with Yakov Goelman, was indicted "... on charges of terrorism, aggravated bodily harm, and damaging property motivated by racism, among other charges..." They were among some 20 extremists who attacked a car with five Israeli Arab women, "... bombarded the women’s vehicle with rocks; sprayed them with teargas; set their car on fire; screamed that they were going to kill them; caused them severe physical injuries and psychological trauma; and psychologically tortured them..." when they mistakenly entered the illegal settlement Givat Ronen. On 28 July 2025, Levi killed Awdah Hathaleen, 31, a Palestinian activist featured in the film No Other Land, near the village of Umm al-Kheir.

The European Union (EU) imposed sanctions on Gopstein's Lehava, citing involvement in serious human rights abuses against Palestinians. The sanctions include asset freezes and travel bans and were announced by the European Council under the EU Global Human Rights Sanctions Regime.

On 3 May 2024, the UK imposed sanctions on the Hilltop Youth and Gopstein's Lehava for “facilitating, inciting and promoting violence against Arab and Palestinian communities.”

In June 2024, Canada sanctioned Gopstein together with six other settlers and five organizations "for their violent and destabilizing actions against Palestinian civilians and their property in the West Bank.”

Similarly, on 28 August 2024, the USA sanctioned another West Bank Jewish settler organization and another West Bank settler:

- Hashomer Yosh, "an Israeli nongovernmental organization that provides material support to U.S.-designated outpost Meitarim Farm, and U.S.-designated individuals Yinon Levi, Neriya Ben Pazi and Zvi Bar Yosef. After all 250 Palestinian residents of Khirbet Zanuta were forced to leave in late January, Hashomer Yosh volunteers fenced off the village to prevent the residents from returning. The volunteers also provided support by grazing the herds and purporting to “guard” the outposts of U.S.-designated individuals."

- Yitzhak Levi Filant, "the civilian security coordinator of the Yitzhar settlement in the West Bank. Although Filant’s role is akin to a security or law enforcement officer, he has engaged in malign activities outside the scope of his authority. In February 2024, he led a group of armed settlers to set up roadblocks and conduct patrols to pursue and attack Palestinians in their lands and forcefully expel them from their lands..."

On 15 October 2024, the UK sanctioned three illegal settler outposts and four organizations. The sanctioned outposts are Tirzah Valley Farm, Meitarim, and Shuvi Eretz for "...facilitating, inciting, promoting or providing support for activity that amounts to a serious abuse of the right of Palestinians not to be subjected to cruel, inhuman or degrading treatment or punishment". The sanctioned organizations include "Od Yosef Chai Yeshiva, a religious school embedded in the Yitzhar settlement known to promote violence against non-Jewish people; Hashomer Yosh, a non-governmental organization that provides volunteers for illegal outposts, including Meitarim; Torat Lechima, a registered Israeli charity...documented as providing financial support to illegal settler outposts linked with acts of violence against Palestinian communities in the West Bank; and Amana which...has overseen the establishment of illegal outposts and provides funding and other economic resources for Israeli settlers involved in threatening and perpetrating acts of aggression and violence against Palestinian communities in the West Bank".

On 21 November 2025, Singapore sanctioned Gopstein along with three other settlers for their involvement in "egregious acts of extremist violence" against Palestinians in the West Bank.
