= 2025 pro-Israel mob attack in Brooklyn =

Attack in New York City

- Part of Gaza war protests in New York City
- Date: 24 April 2025
- Location: Chabad-Lubavitch World Headquarters in Crown Heights, Brooklyn; 40.669021°N 73.942870°W
- Caused by: Protests against visit of Israeli security minister Itamar Ben-Gvir

Casualties
- Injuries: 2

On 24 April 2025, a mob of pro-Israel Orthodox Jewish men and boys attacked a smaller group of people protesting a visit of Israel's Minister of National Security Itamar Ben-Gvir to the Chabad-Lubavitch World Headquarters in Crown Heights, Brooklyn. The mob followed and assaulted two women. One victim, an Israeli-American protester, was hit in the head with an unknown object and required stitches. The other woman, a bystander, was shoved, kicked, hit with a traffic cone, and threatened with rape and phrases like "Death to Arabs" while a police officer escorted her to a police car. In a lawsuit against New York City, the two victims accused the New York City Police Department (NYPD) of failing to protect them from assault because of bias against pro-Palestine protesters. As of November 2025, no one has been arrested for the assaults.

== Background ==
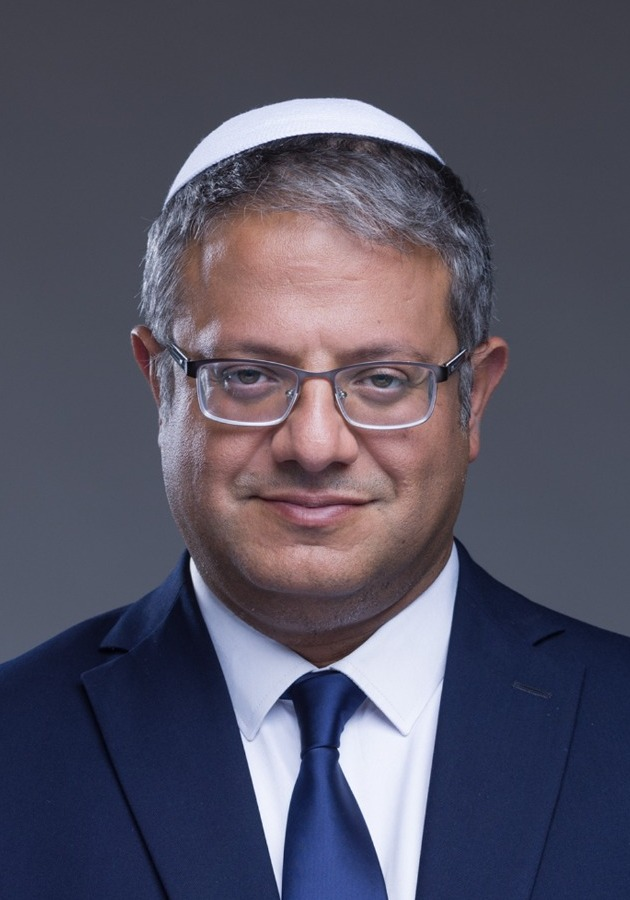
Itamar Ben-Gvir, associated with the far-right in Israel, visited the US April 2025 as Minister of National Security in the cabinet of Benjamin Netanyahu.

In April 2025, Israeli security minister Itamar Ben-Gvir took a state visit to the United States as a member of Benjamin Netanyahu's cabinet. On the far-right of Israeli politics, Ben-Gvir leads the Otzma Yehudit political party and has previously been convicted of racial incitement and support for terrorism in Israel. As a young man, he was forbidden from joining the Israeli military because of his views, unlike most Israeli Jews who are required to serve. A resident of the West Bank settlement of Kiryat Arba, he previously displayed a picture in his home of Baruch Goldstein who killed 29 Palestinians at a mosque in 1994. During the Gaza war, he has opposed ceasefires.

Ben-Gvir was met with protests throughout his trip to the US. On 23 April 2025, hundreds of people protested outside his appearance at a Shabtai event in New Haven, Connecticut. On 24 April, hundreds of protesters, including Representative Jerry Nadler, city comptroller Brad Lander, and several rabbis protested outside of a Tablet magazine event attended by Ben-Gvir.

== Incident ==
External videos
- Mob of Orthodox Jewish men chase woman after mistaking her for protester in New York on YouTube from The Associated Press
- Brooklyn woman attacked by pro-Israel mob on YouTube from SBS World News

On the evening of 24 April 2025, Ben-Gvir made a public appearance at 770 Eastern Parkway, the global headquarters of the Chabad Lubavitch Movement in Brooklyn's Crown Heights neighborhood. He prayed, gave a speech, and led a chant about the Messiah. According to Chabad headquarters, he was not officially invited to appear. Outside, a small group of protesters gathered; according to Haaretz, the protesters included pro-Palestine protesters as well as some Jews and Israelis who oppose Ben-Gvir. They were met by a larger group of counterprotestors, many of whom were local Orthodox Jewish men. Pro-Israel counterprotestors burned a keffiyeh, assaulted a Neturei Karta protester on the ground after pushing him, and pushed a woman after grabbing her Palestinian flag. Pro-Palestine protesters from Within Our Lifetime chanted slogans like “Resistance is justified when people are occupied” and “We don't want no two states, we want all of it.” According to public relations representatives from Chabad, the pro-Palestine protesters used pepper spray and shouted "hateful, inflammatory rhetoric".

An Israeli-American woman, identified as "E.", was one of the pro-Palestine protesters. As a child, her family attended a Chabad synagogue. She stated that the pro-Israel counterprotestors threw eggs and unknown liquids at the 30-40 pro-Palestine protesters who were waving flags and chanting and the police did not step in. She stated that she felt unsafe after a mob surrounded the pro-Palestine protesters, so she decided to leave. As she was walking away, a mob of mostly men followed her and she felt something hit her in the head. According to witnesses, she was hit with a brick. Fellow protesters protected her as she lay on the ground, and according to a witness, men from Chabad joked and took photos of her. An ambulance took her to the hospital where she required stitches for her injuries. Photos from the incident showed her with a bloody face.

Towards the end of the protest, a local resident arrived; she later stated that she had come to find out what was happening after observing police helicopters in the sky and had covered her face with a scarf to avoid being filmed. She was soon surrounded by hundreds of pro-Israel counterprotestors who incorrectly assumed she was a pro-Palestine protester. Video of the incident showed that the mob of men and boys followed her and shouted offensive phrases at her, including "death to Arabs" in Hebrew. She was pushed, kicked in the back, and had a traffic cone thrown at her head, while a single police officer escorted her for several blocks to a police car. The woman later stated that she was terrified and that the police did not adequately protect her. She stated that the mob had shouted rape threats and abuse like "you are a waste of semen" and "you are failed abortion" at her.

Images of the two victims went viral on social media, including a photo of one victim's bloodied face and video of the other victim being followed and assaulted by the mob.

== Aftermath ==
=== Responses ===
The NYPD announced that they had arrested 6 people that night; one was charged with assault and the rest were released with summonses but did not specify whether they had arrested protesters or counter-protesters. Mayor Eric Adams announced that two women had been assaulted in the protests and that the police were investigating. He stated that "None of this is acceptable" and that “New York City will always be a place where people can peacefully protest, but we will not tolerate violence, trespassing, menacing, or threatening.”

Representatives Elise Stefanik and Mike Lawler condemned the protests as antisemitic. When asked about the assault, Ben-Gvir stated that he had not heard of it and that he was more concerned about violence against Jews. A Chabad-Lubavitch spokesman, Rabbi Motti Seligson, characterized the counterprotestors as a "small breakaway group of young people" and denounced their actions as "entirely unacceptable and wholly antithetical to the Torah's values". He also condemned the pro-Palestine protesters, saying that they had “called for the genocide of Jews in support of terrorists and terrorism." He also referenced the 1991 Crown Heights riots. A representative of the Anti-Defamation League condemned the assault and also stated that it was unacceptable that "Jews meeting in a synagogue be shouted down with antisemitic slurs or accusations of genocide"

Nerdeen Kiswani of Within Our Lifetime blamed the NYPD for not stopping the assaults, calling the violence "a brutal and coordinated attack against anyone opposing genocide." CAIR-NY Executive Director Afaf Nasher condemned the violence and called for the police to investigate the incident as a hate crime.

=== Protests ===
On 27 April, pro-Palestinian protestors assembled in Gravesend, Brooklyn, in front of two synagogues, one of which was preparing to host Ben-Gvir. However, his planned speech for that morning was canceled. Pro-Israeli counterprotestors also arrived at the area. By early afternoon the pro-Palestinian protestors had left, and again, six people in total were arrested. Local pro-Israeli publication The Jewish Voice shared footage of scuffles between protestors and the NYPD in the neighborhood.

On 28 April, in anticipation of renewed protests in Crown Heights, the administration of the Tomchei Tminim at the Chabad-Lubavitch headquarters released a letter to yeshiva students instructing them to refrain from counterprotesting and to remain focused on their studies. That night, a small protest was held near Barclays Center in response to the mob attack. It was announced in a flier promising to "flood the streets of Crown Heights to inform them Zionism is not welcome here." A local yeshiva and shomrim security group warned residents to avoid the protest, but Betar, a rightwing Zionist group, threatened to confront the protesters. Over the course of about an hour, the protesters attempted to walk towards Chabad headquarters but were continuously thwarted by the police. The police also arrested one person.

=== Lawsuit ===
In July 2025, one victim began proceedings to file a $1.25 million lawsuit against the NYPD. Her claim alleges that the NYPD did not sufficiently protect her from the mob because they mistakenly thought she was a pro-Palestine protester. The claim accuses the NYPD of violating her freedom of speech due to "disparate treatment of protesters in New York City based on their point of view". The NYPD stated that the assault is under investigation by the Hate Crimes Task Force and they are offering a reward of $3,500 for information.

Later that year, the two victims sued New York City for an unspecified amount of money. The lawsuit accuses the NYPD of failing to protect the two women because of bias against pro-Palestine protesters. The lawsuit states that the NYPD training manual characterizes left-wing protesters as violent and that the NYPD has previously refrained from arresting right-wing protesters despite acts of violence. As of November 2025, no one has been arrested for the assaults. According to City Council member Crystal Hudson, the police have not arrested suspects because of a lack of witness testimony.

== See also ==
- Racism in Israel
