= Zion Square assault =

2012 attack by Israelis against Palestinians

Zion Square lynching
- Location: Zion Square, Jerusalem
- Date: 16–17 August 2012
- Injuries: 3 Palestinian teenagers (1 seriously injured)
- Perpetrator: Mass assault by 10–15 Israeli teenagers

Israeli youths attacked four Palestinian teenagers on the night of 16–17 August 2012 at Zion Square in Jerusalem. The four were chased by 10–15 teenagers and a 17-year-old Palestinian boy Jamal Julani was beaten unconscious and subsequently found to be in a critical condition. The attack was described by Israeli police and the judge who passed sentence as a "lynch" or "attempted lynch(ing)".

Originally reported by police as a brawl between two groups, the incident achieved notoriety after an Israeli eyewitness posted an account on Facebook reporting that dozens of Israeli youths had tried to beat to death three Arab youths, and that, when one fell, they continued to kick his head. After the assailants fled, others in the vicinity stood about shouting angrily. When Israeli volunteers on the scene gave the boy assistance, their action was greeted by bystanders with expressions of resentment. Julani had a heart condition and had to be revived by a responding medic. He was released from hospital a week after the attack. In July 2013 he was still undergoing neurological and psychological care. An eyewitness reported that police marked the site as a murder scene.

Reports said that during the episode a policeman observed the assault without intervening. However, a police investigation determined that this referred to an earlier altercation nearby. Prompt intervention by Magen David Adom, including C.P.R., managed to revive him. Authorities called his survival a miracle. Police commissioner Yohanan Danino told the press, "The lynch in Jerusalem was the most severe and contemptible act imaginable in a democratic law-abiding country."

On 19 August, Israeli police arrested several Israeli teenagers, the youngest of whom was 13 years old. One of the suspects expressed no regret. The attack took place on the same day as a firebombing of a Palestinian taxi driving near the Israeli settlement of Bat Ayin in which a Palestinian family of 5 and their driver suffered serious burns. The incidents were condemned in Israel and throughout the world and a national debate over anti-Arabism ensued.

== The attack ==
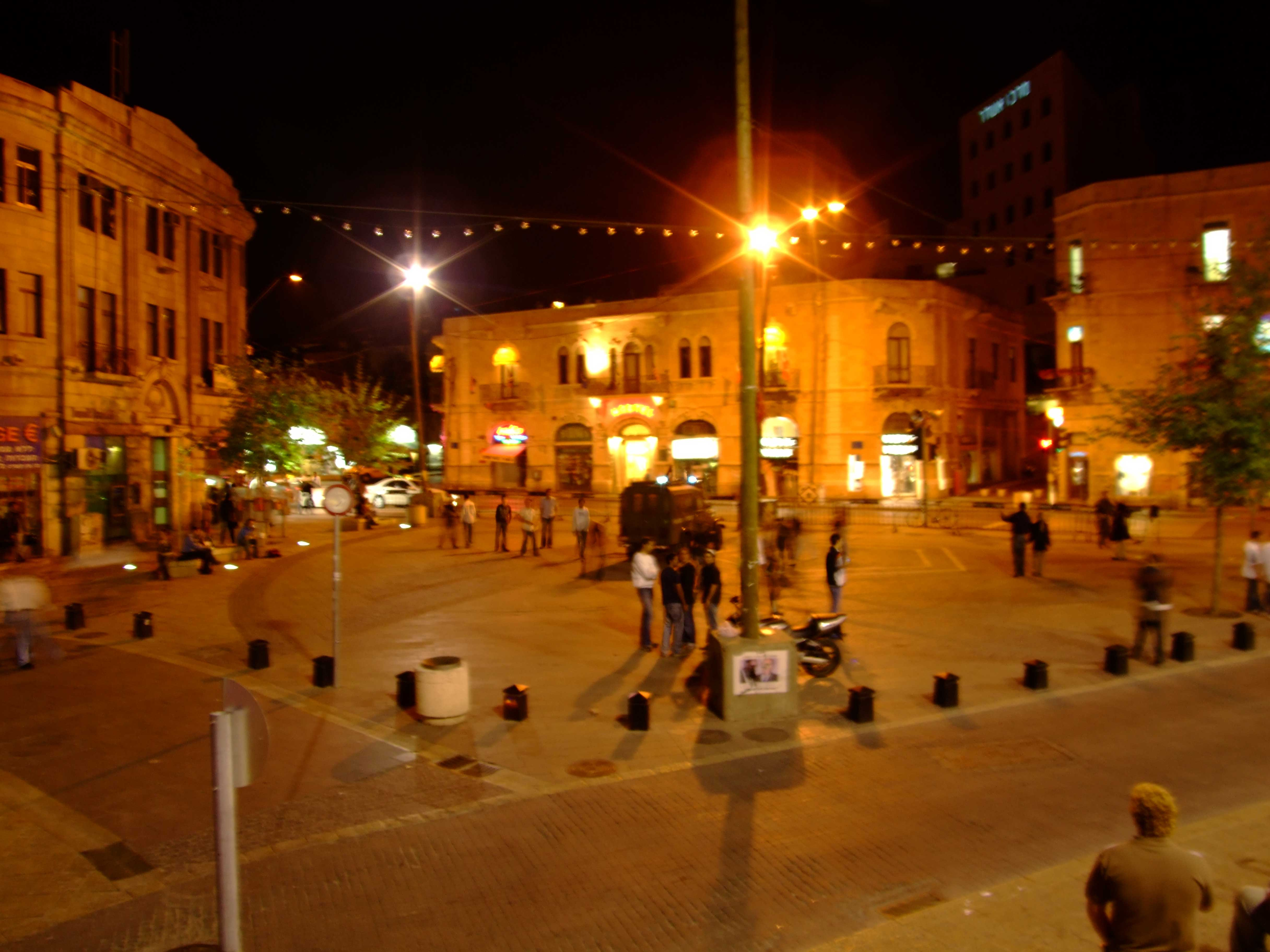
Zion Square at night

The attack took place on Thursday night 16 August 2012, in Jerusalem's busy pub and entertainment district on the eve of Eid-ul-Fitr, which marks the end of Ramadan. This year Israel had issued large numbers of entry permits to Palestinians to visit Jerusalem over the Muslim holy month. According to interviews with the Palestinian victims, 17-year-old Jamal Julani, a matriculating student from the predominantly Palestinian East Jerusalem neighborhood of Ras al-Amud, together with his cousins Muhammad Mujahid, 17, and Nuaman Julani, and a fourth boy were attacked and chased by some 50 Israeli youths, shouting "Death to Arabs".

The harassment began in Kikar Hahatulot (Cats' Square), which is notorious for its late-night drunken brawls. Initial reports spoke of a group singing racist, anti-Arab songs when, according to police, a girl declared she had been molested sexually, or raped, by an Arab, and this remark is said to have caused the boys' rampage, which started by beating up an Arab who happened to be passing by.

Suspects gave defense lawyers a number of different versions of the events. According to the police indictment in late August, when the group met up in central Jerusalem, a girl noted the presence of Arabs and told her friends, the defendants, that Arabs should not be seated there. Other teens joining in suggested attacking them. One said: "Whoever wants to show that he's a man go and hit the Arabs." The girl then shouted racist slogans—"Mohammad is dead" and "Death to Arabs", and several were chased from the area. According to Reuven Rivlin some of the assailants wore shirts with a Betar symbol, which symbolizes both the revisionist Zionist youth movement created by Ze'ev Jabotinsky in 1923 and also a Jerusalem soccer team. Press reports state that hundreds of bystanders refrained from intervening. A Palestinian, who had himself been previously scarred by a cut from a bottle in an assault by Jewish youths, said that on the night in question Jewish and Arab workers at the restaurant where he is employed had driven off the mob, which was chanting "Death to the Arabs".

According to the indictment by prosecutors nearly a year later, some 60 youths in Cats' Square began to harassing Arab youths around 11.30 pm, ordering them not to sit there and yelling slogans against Muhammad and Arabs. Some thirty of the group them hived off towards Zion Square in search of Arabs to beat. The pursuing groups were composed of an "inner circle" involved directly in the assault, and an "outer circle" that joined in and encouraged them. An attempt was made to kick a passing Arab, and a group encircled other Arabs who managed to flee. Shortly afterwards, they noted Jamal and three other boys, and gave chase, and hit one in the back of the neck. According to his cousin Nuaman, one attacker said to Jamal, "What are you doing, you son of a bitch?", and as Jamal tried to flee he was whacked in the chest and fell. The teenagers continued to kick him after he fell down unconscious, but as more police arrived, according to the Palestinians, the crowd quickly dispersed.

When a Magen David Adom ambulance and emergency crew arrived on the scene, a paramedic, Amir Edri, found Jamal without pulse. It was initially thought he was dead but after 10 minutes of intense CPR and electric shock his pulse returned. The three other Palestinians in the group suffered only minor injuries.

Though one of the arrested suspects spoke of 40 to 50 youths involved in the beating, police concluded at the time that the number of Jewish youngsters directly implicated ranged from 10 to 15, while a few dozen others just stood around and watched. They also concluded that the attack was unprovoked. On the following Monday, a police spokesman, Sergeant Shmuel Shinhav, described the assault as "simply a lynch". Police later said that the fact Jamal suffered from a heart condition may have contributed to his loss of consciousness. A lawyer for one of the girls who was involved but, according to him, did not participate in the beating, said that the teenagers had intended to beat him to death.

Jamal was taken in a comatose state to the Hadassah University Hospital in Ein Kerem in southwest Jerusalem, where a Palestinian taxi-driver was also undergoing intensive care after suffering serious burns together with five members of the Abu Jayada family of Nahalin from a Molotov cocktail attack outside the West Bank settlement of Bat Ayin earlier that day. A Jewish settler and resident of Kfar Etzion, Meir "Meron" Yehoshua, on hearing news of the firebombing, contacted the families of both the taxi-driver and his passengers and volunteered to drive them across the checkpoints to facilitate their visits to the hospital. A week later, police detained three Israeli adolescents from the Bat Ayin settlement, all between 12 and 13, on suspicion of involvement in the taxi firebombing. Deputy Prime Minister Moshe Ya'alon regarded both incidents as terrorist attacks that "constitute first and foremost an educational and moral failure".

Jamal was in a coma for two days. On emerging from it he said he had no memory of the attack and no fear of returning to downtown Jerusalem. No official state or municipal representatives visited him for several days, but Thursday, 23 August, Knesset Speaker Reuven Rivlin paid Jamal a visit to apologise on behalf of the state. Rivlin told him that the assault was evidently not an "isolated incident of racism towards Arabs, but a worrying phenomenon in Israeli society" and that it was "a microcosm of a national problem that could endanger Israeli democracy". In the following days the police arrested eight teens, two of them girls, ranging in ages from 13 to 19. A brother of one of the suspects who was also present asserted that the four Arab boys had provoked passersby and "made passes at Jewish girls", adding that "(Arabs) shouldn't be here, it's our area. For what other reason would they come here if not to make passes at Jewish girls?" Another eyewitness said the Israeli group appeared to be hunting for Arabs.

Jamal's mother called the youths terrorists and added that they themselves were had no political ideas and that, "We brought our children up to study, to be good and to love their homeland." His father was at a loss to understand why the youths did this, but called his son lucky for having survived.

Fear spread throughout Israeli Arab communities in the wake of the two incidents, particularly in Jaffa, Safed and Haifa.

== Facebook report ==
A volunteer for the Elem NGO, which aids Israeli and Palestinian youths in distress, and who happened to be present at the scene, posted an eyewitness account on Facebook that night. She opened her account with the remark:

It's late at night, and I can't sleep. My eyes are full of tears for a good few hours now and my stomach is turning inside out with the question of the loss of humanity, the image of God in mankind, a loss that I am not willing to accept.

According to the report, loud shouts of "A Jew is a good soul, an Arab is a son of a —," could be heard and dozens of youths ran and gathered to beat, nearly to death, three Arab youths strolling peacefully along Ben Yehuda Street. When volunteers tried to resuscitate Jamal, she added, a mass of bystanders reportedly asked resentfully why they were reviving an Arab. Later, as Jamal's cousin gave testimony to the police two youths queried why he should be handed a bottle of water, and one of them commented: "He is an Arab, and they don't need to walk around in the center of the city, and they deserve it, because this way they will finally be afraid." She complained that

Children aged 15–18 are killing a child their own age with their own hands. Really with their own hands. Children whose hearts were unmoved when they beat to death a boy their age who lay writhing on the floor.

=== Investigations and arrests of the perpetrators ===
According to one report, the whole incident was recorded on official surveillance cameras and the police said other arrests were to be expected. Sources in the Jerusalem Municipality now claim the city's security cameras were being upgraded at the time the attack took place and thus not working in the area. They said that the police would be reviewing, instead, footage recorded on cameras operated by local businesses.

In an early report, Ma'ariv wrote that some 40 minutes before Jamal's near fatal beating, people had called the police to report a brawl, and an on-duty policeman arrived and stood by as the violence unfolded. One Arab employed near the scene who had phoned the police claimed that on arriving a police officer decided not to act when he saw that the brawl involved teenagers. The police department rejected the allegation, and replied that this call referred to the earlier altercation. They affirmed that when, 40 minutes later, further calls arrived reporting violence at Zion Square, additional officers were sent.

Acting Jerusalem police chief General Menachem Yitzhaki established a special team to conduct investigations. The Israeli police had initially called the episode a "brawl", but 3 days later, on Sunday, termed it a "lynching". According to a police account given to the magistrates' court, the attack took place in the heart of Jerusalem before a crowd that numbered in the hundreds, some of whose members egged the attackers on. Police have stated that they have found no evidence to corroborate suggestions the Palestinians had been provocative earlier, and were increasingly convinced Jamal had been attacked simply because he was an Arab.

Between Sunday and Tuesday, police rounded up 8 youths ranging in age from 13 to 19, including three girls, on suspicion of being involved in the assault, and brought them before magistrates for a remand hearing. One of the girls, still under detention a week later, came from an ultra-Orthodox family and had until recently studied at the Beit Yaakov seminary. Tamar Rotem, examining the backgrounds of some of the youths, identifies them as hailing from low-income Haredi neighbourhoods suffering from neglect and as drop-outs from religious seminaries.

According to one of the defense lawyers, the suspects have provided different accounts of how the events unfolded. One version was that the Jewish youths were singing racist songs and chanting anti-Arab slogans when they came across the four Arab teenagers. Some said that the Arabs were actually harassing them. By Monday, the deputy commander of the Lev Habira police station said investigators believe one girl in the group had incited the attackers. A chase ensued that ended 200 yards away in Zion Square, where 10 people managed to catch Jamal. In late August, police filed indictments against 9 teens for aggravated battery, aggravated assault and incitement to violence, and requested the court to hold them in detention until the end of proceedings. One, a girl, was released on house arrest.

=== Statements by the alleged assailants ===
- "For my part he can die, he's an Arab. If it was up to me, I'd have murdered him."—The 14-year-old suspect, identified only as O, said to court reporters on Monday 20 August.
- "He insulted my mom. So I caught him and beat him. I hit him and I hope he gets it again. I hope he dies. You can't go by Damascus Gate without getting stabbed. So why do they come here? I beat him, and I'd beat him again. I'm not sorry for what I did."

=== Trial ===
Three teenagers and four men were indicted on charges of assaulting Arabs in Zion Square. Several eventually made plea bargains, confessing to some of the charges. On 8 July 2013, the Jerusalem District Court handed down its verdict on the three minors charged with the assaults, finding them guilty. Defendant No.1 was sentenced to 8 months detention for aggravated assault; defendant No.2 was convicted of incitement to violence and racism, and given three months in detention; defendant No.3 was sentenced to 30 days in prison, and a 2-month suspended sentence, for aiding aggravated assault out of racist motives. The Jewish Telegraphic Agency reported the sentence as a "slap on the wrist". Ben-Zion Gopstein of Lehava, an organization dedicated to anti-assimilation, declared to reporters outside the courtroom that: "It seems that here the youth raised Jewish pride off the floor, and did what the police should have done."

== Aftermath ==
The Israeli Minister for Education requested that time be set aside in all junior and high schools throughout Israel for a lesson on the attempted lynching episode. The incident did not deter Palestinians from East Jerusalem or those from the West Bank who had obtained permits from visiting downtown Jerusalem. Tamar Rotem reported that life at Zion Square has resumed its normal tranquil rhythms. Interviewing youths from the Bnei Akiva National Religious Party's youth movement, she found they knew nothing of the incident, and, when informed of the circumstances, were quick to come to the defense of the suspected perpetrators. One said: "It's very good that they (the Jewish assailants) hit them. . . It's just too bad they didn't kill them." Another boasted, "Had I been there, I would have killed them." Arabs are, they said, "terrorists who carry out attacks and want to murder all of us". The director of the Masorti community, Rabbi Andrew Sacks, while noting that the attack elicited condemnation over the entire spectrum of the Jewish world, also drew attention to a certain diffidence, in the fact that Lehava had begun circulating a flyer in Jerusalem soon afterwards that was warning Arab males against flirting with or talking to Jewish girls. The pamphlet, distributed both in Hebrew and Arabic, is similar to former messages by the Kach movement, reads in part: "We don't want you to get hurt, respect our girls' honor because they are dear to our hearts," and "If you're thinking of going to the pedestrian mall or the Jerusalem mall in order to go out with Jewish girls, this isn't the place. You can walk around your village and find girlfriends there. Not by us! Last week an Arab who thought he'd find some Jewish girls got hurt. We don't want you to get hurt." Jerusalem police later asked the Justice Ministry for guidance in determining whether or not to pursue allegations that Lehava is inciting Jerusalemites to racism.

In response to a claim by two east Jerusalem Arab teens that they were assaulted by three men at Tel Aviv beach after asking for directions and had had great difficulty in obtaining redress from the police when they tried to file a complaint, Knesset representative Ta'al party member Ahmad Tibi put the blame on Israeli police for failing in their duties. "Imagine Israel's response had the tables been turned and a Jew was lynched at an Arab town," Tibi declared, adding that a "hunting season for Arabs is at its height with support from a rightist government and racist Knesset". An Israeli news source phrased this story in its first sentence as: "Two East Jerusalem teens are claiming they were assaulted by three men in Tel Aviv earlier this week in what could be another case of racist violence after last week's Jerusalem lynch."

In later years where violent rampages have led to the killing or beating up of Palestinian youths, the case of Jamal Julani has been cited to argue that racially motivated attacks on Palestinians are nothing new, or that the lessons inculcated at the time have not sunk in. Mohammed Sayyad of At-Tur, the youth who had alerted police to the violence against Julani, was himself attacked while having a meal by an Israeli group hunting Arabs 2 years later, who threw stones and threatened to kill him.

In 2014 Lehava established a booth to distribute flyers, harass Arabs in the area and shout anti-Arab slogans in Zion Square hours after the burial of three Israeli teens who were murdered in the West Bank. Almost simultaneously, a leftist group formed to counter their activities in the square. Both groups organized just hours before Mohammed Abu Khdeir was kidnapped and murdered. The confrontations between the two groups continued for some months, regularly every Thursday and Saturday night. A year later, in May 2015, an Ir Amim researcher Aviv Tatarsky, observing a similar incident of a Palestinian fleeing from Zion Square with a group of Jewish youths in pursuit, stated that the practice has been commonplace for years and that in the preceding year, such violent attacks in central Jerusalem, reminiscent of what happened to Jamal Julani took place almost every night from July through to December.

== The public debate in Israel ==
- Nimrod Aloni, the head of the Institute for Educational Thought at Kibbutzim College of Education, Tel Aviv, in an interview on Channel 1, linked the youths' attitude directly to national fundamentalism, and argued it was identical to the rhetoric of neo-Nazis, Taliban and Ku Klux Klan. Aloni stated that: "This comes from an entire culture that has been escalating toward an open and blunt language based on us being the chosen people who are allowed to do whatever we like."
- Gavriel Salomon, a professor of educational psychology at Haifa University, speaking to Israel Radio, attributed the attacks to increasing racism and violence in Israeli society, and an atmosphere of "legitimacy", declaring that "[s]uddenly it's not so terrible to burn Arabs inside a taxi."
- Zohar Eitan, a Tel Aviv University lecturer in musicology, on visiting Jamal to show solidarity as "an ordinary citizen", called the attack "very sad but unfortunately not shocking. It is the result of the indoctrination that these kids get."
- Local police say the attack "reflected profound hatred among Jewish youths in Jerusalem for local Arabs".
- Yehudit Oppenheimer, executive director of Ir Amim, blamed the attack on rampant discrimination, a policy he argues excluded Palestinians from the public sphere in Jerusalem, turning their neighbourhoods in East Jerusalem into islands of poverty and neglect, and "a climate that permits public displays of hatred towards foreigners".
- Blogger Mairav Zonszein, who initially translated the eyewitness testimony on Facebook and published it in an accessible English version, argued that despite the widespread condemnation of the two attacks as examples of a "hate crime" and "terror attack", such assaults are not an "aberration from the norm" but are on the rise, with a 39% increase in acts of settler violence from 2010 to 2011 when 2.6 incidents a day were registered. She argued that similar acts of violence are treated differently by the law. An Israeli man who, assisted by accomplices and bystanders, used a razor blade to kill a Palestinian East Jerusalemite encountered in the Zion Square area in February 2011 received an 8-year sentence for manslaughter, while a 29-year sentence was handed down to Palestinian minors for killing an Israeli, Aryeh Karp, on a Tel Aviv beach in 2009. Zonszein stated that two different justice systems are in operation and that public condemnations by politicians were little more than lip-service.
- Haaretz published a piece that placed a portion of the blame on some of the attackers being drop-outs from impoverished Haredi neighborhoods.

== Foreign commentary ==
- Jeffrey Goldberg, writing for The Atlantic, argued that such violence is not common, and that Jerusalem's Arabs and Jews have achieved "in the city's public spaces, a kind of side-by-side integration". It's in the nature of things, he continued, that Jewish violence draws more coverage than Arab violence against Jews at times. Goldberg commended the arrests and said the acid test would take place in a future trial: "Will they be given sentences that match the gravity of the crime, or will they get off easy? It would be appalling, but unsurprising, if this is ultimately not treated as an attempted murder."
- Jill Jacobs, executive director of Rabbis for Human Rights-North America, wrote that indictments will probably lead to a "few bad apples" verdict, but that the incident posed an issue for the global Jewish community. It differs, she argues, from price tag incidents, which may be dismissed as the handiwork of a few radical settlers. Recently, again in the heart of Jerusalem, a group of mostly teenage Beitar soccer fans had stormed the Malha Mall to attack Arab workers and shoppers and hurl racist abuse. Just as American Jews, mindful of the lynching of Leo Frank, once had to confront directly the issue of anti-Semitism and the broader and deeper undercurrents of racism and bigotry, they must take a hard look at the way Palestinians are being portrayed. Terms that, if applied to Jews, would be deemed virulently anti-Semitic, are often used of Palestinians, and some children get the impression hatred of Arabs is acceptable. "[R]eal teshuvah, repentance", she concludes, "will come only when we ensure that our everyday language does not teach our children to hate".
- Bradley Burston, surveying the work of pro-Israeli supporters like Pamela Geller, who, in his view, espouse the cause of a Jewish state by promoting hatred of Islam, argues that there are worrisome signs in the United States of a trend that is conflating Islamophobia with support for Israel, which runs in tandem with attacks on Palestinians by settlers and by Arab-hating youths in Israel. "Israel," he concludes, "has elaborate defense systems against military attack and terrorism. Its defenses against its own extremists are much more porous."
- Both Jonathan Jeremy Goldberg and Gil Troy are heartened by the official response in Israel to the assault. Goldberg noted that in August, both the U.S. and Israel had suffered wake-up calls in their struggles against terrorism. Both the Wisconsin Sikh temple shooting and the Zion square incident (together with the taxi fire-bombing) came from an overlooked quarter, the activities of right-wing nativists, be they white supremacist or Christians, or Jewish fundamentalists. Whereas the U.S. appears to have ignored the extremists, in Israel national outrage prompted soul-searching and calls across political partisan lines to re-examine the educational system and crackdown on violent settlers. Gil Troy notes that the entire Israeli political spectrum was united in expressing "outrage and shame". Israel's critics use such incidents to indict Israeli society, but on this occasion Israel's own right-wing government has publicly assumed responsibility and taken measures in educational reform to ensure Israel's youth will not stray towards violence.
- Architect Michael Sorkin, in a 2016 essay on the politics of architecture, and the promotional use of Zion Square as a zone of tolerance, and of Israel as a place affording a safe haven for Palestinian queers from their own culture, cites the case as one where despite the vaunted tolerance, the reality was that of bystanders not intervening to stop the aggression, and suggests that the pinkwashing project's message was that a broader "intolerance", against Palestinians, would not be protested there.

== Official reactions ==
=== Domestic ===
Israel:

- Israeli Prime Minister Benjamin Netanyahu condemned the taxi firebombing and spoke out about the attack in Zion square, saying, "In the State of Israel we aren't willing to tolerate racism and we aren't willing to tolerate the combination of racism and violence."
- Mark Regev, Netanyahu's spokesman, said: "We unequivocally condemn racist violence and urge the police and law enforcement community to act expeditiously to bring the perpetrators to justice."
- Moshe Ya'alon, Israel's Vice Prime Minister called this incident and a separate attack on a cab driver "hate crimes" and "heinous acts".
- Jerusalem Mayor Nir Barkat strongly condemned the incident, and called for "continued coexistence" but cautioned against jumping to premature conclusions about the motivation behind it. One critic has replied that Barkat himself presides over both institutional segregation and the proliferation of hostile Jewish settlements in Palestinian neighbourhoods of East Jerusalem.
- Education Minister for Education Gideon Saar, who called the incident "violent" and "racist" instructed Israeli schools to discuss it in classes when the school term recommences. His declaration was attacked as "lip-service" by Mairav Zonszein, who pointed out that it was Saar who initiated field trips for Israeli schoolchildren to Hebron where acts of brutality against Palestinians are reportedly not uncommon and, she asserts, have not been condemned by the Minister.

=== Foreign ===
- U.S. Department of State spokeswoman Victoria Nuland issued a written statement on the assault: "We condemn in the strongest possible terms the senseless act of hate and violence committed against a Palestinian youth in Jerusalem on August 17. We wish victim Jamal Julani a speedy recovery. Discriminatory acts of violence undermine and discredit efforts toward peace and security between Israelis and Palestinians. We welcome Prime Minister Netanyahu's unequivocal condemnation of racism and violence and his call for a full police investigation. The perpetrators of this hateful crime must be held to account."
- The Anti-Defamation League issued a statement expressing its horror at the two violent attacks against Palestinians.

== See also ==
- Racism in Israel
