= Lehava =

Jewish far-right organization in Israel

Prevention of Assimilation in the Holy Land
- למניעת התבוללות בארץ הקודש
- Abbreviation: Lehava
- Formation: 2005
- Founder: Bentzi Gopstein
- Purpose: Anti-intermarriage
- Headquarters: Jerusalem
- Members: 10,000
- Leader: Bentzi Gopstein
- Key people: Michael Ben-Ari; Bentzi Gopstein; Baruch Marzel; Itamar Ben-Gvir
- Affiliations: Otzma Yehudit; Hemla
- Website: lehava-us.com

Lehava (להב״ה "Flame," Hebrew: למניעת התבוללות בארץ הקודש LiMniat Hitbolelut B'eretz HaKodesh; Prevention of Assimilation in the Holy Land) is an Israeli far-right and Jewish supremacist organization based in Israel that strictly opposes Jewish assimilation, objecting to most personal relationships between Jews and non-Jews. It is opposed to the Christian presence in Israel. It has an anti-intermarriage focus, denouncing marriages between Jews and non-Jews forbidden by Orthodox Jewish law. The group has over 10,000 members. In 2024, the United States placed Lehava and its leader, Bentzi Gopstein, on a sanctions list for their role in fomenting Israeli settler violence against Palestinians in the Israeli-occupied West Bank, labeling Lehava "the largest violent extremist organization in Israel."

== Etymology ==
Lehava (להב״ה) is an acronym for the Hebrew phrase LiMniat Hitbolelut B'eretz HaKodesh (For the Prevention of Assimilation in the Holy Land). It is also the Hebrew word for "flame", implying a keeping of the flame or faith, giving the phrase a double meaning.

== Prominent members and supporters ==
Lehava's CEO is Bentzi Gopstein, a disciple of Meir Kahane, a U.S.-born rabbi who promoted the forced expulsion of most Palestinians and Arab Israelis from Israel and the Palestinian territories. Gopstein had run-ins with the police for disorderly conduct while active with Kahane's movement Kach, which was banned from Israeli politics as racist in 1988. The U.S. State Department identified Kach as a terrorist organization in 1994. Its splinter group, Kahane Chai, also "condones violence as a viable method for establishing a religiously homogenous [sic] state." In 2006 decision, a U.S. Federal Court determined on appeal that Kach was correctly listed as a terrorist organization. Lehava employs a number of Kahanist figures, including politician Baruch Marzel, formerly of the outlawed Kach movement. Michael Ben-Ari, a former Israeli Member of Knesset who still views himself as Meir Kahane's follower, is Lehava's spokesman. The lawyer defending Lehava members arrested in December 2014, attorney Itamar Ben-Gvir, is another one of the most prominent Kahanists in Israel.

A closely associated NPO called Hemla (Mercy), which for many years focused on "saving the daughters of Israel" from mixed marriages with Arab men, has received up to $175,000 per year from the state between 2005 and 2013. In 2011, an investigation by Haaretz first brought the issue to light. Part of the amount went as a salary to Bentzi Gopstein, Hemla's public relations director.

Lehava is closely associated with the political party Otzma Yehudit, which is led by Itamar Ben-Gvir; the party shares its headquarters with Lehava in Jerusalem, and in 2014, police raided their headquarters.

In January 2015, the Israeli TV channel Channel 2 reported that Defense Minister Moshe Ya'alon might be preparing to categorize Lehava as a terrorist organization. Ya'alon was reported to have ordered the Shin Bet and the Defense Ministry to assemble evidence required for the classification, although ultimately no such classification occurred. Three members of Lehava were arrested and indicted in 2014 for committing arson and spray-painting anti-Arab graffiti at the Max Rayne Hand in Hand: Center for Jewish Arab Education in Israel (Yad B'Yad) Bilingual School in Jerusalem, and Lehava's leader, Bentzi Gopstein, along with other group members, was arrested shortly thereafter for incitement. The arson incident received international attention. Reuters reports that government action against Lehava has only come following months of petitioning by "left-leaning Israelis and media commentators". In response, Gopstein issued a statement harshly critical of Ya'alon: "I suggest that [Ya'alon] aim to outlaw the Islamist Movement and then preoccupy itself with an anti-assimilation group... Instead of taking care of an enemy of Israel, the defense minister is trying to win over votes from the Left [by] taking on Lehava. The group acts to save the daughters of Israel [Jewish women] and deserves the Israel Prize." The group has over 10,000 members, with chapters in every city.

== Activities ==
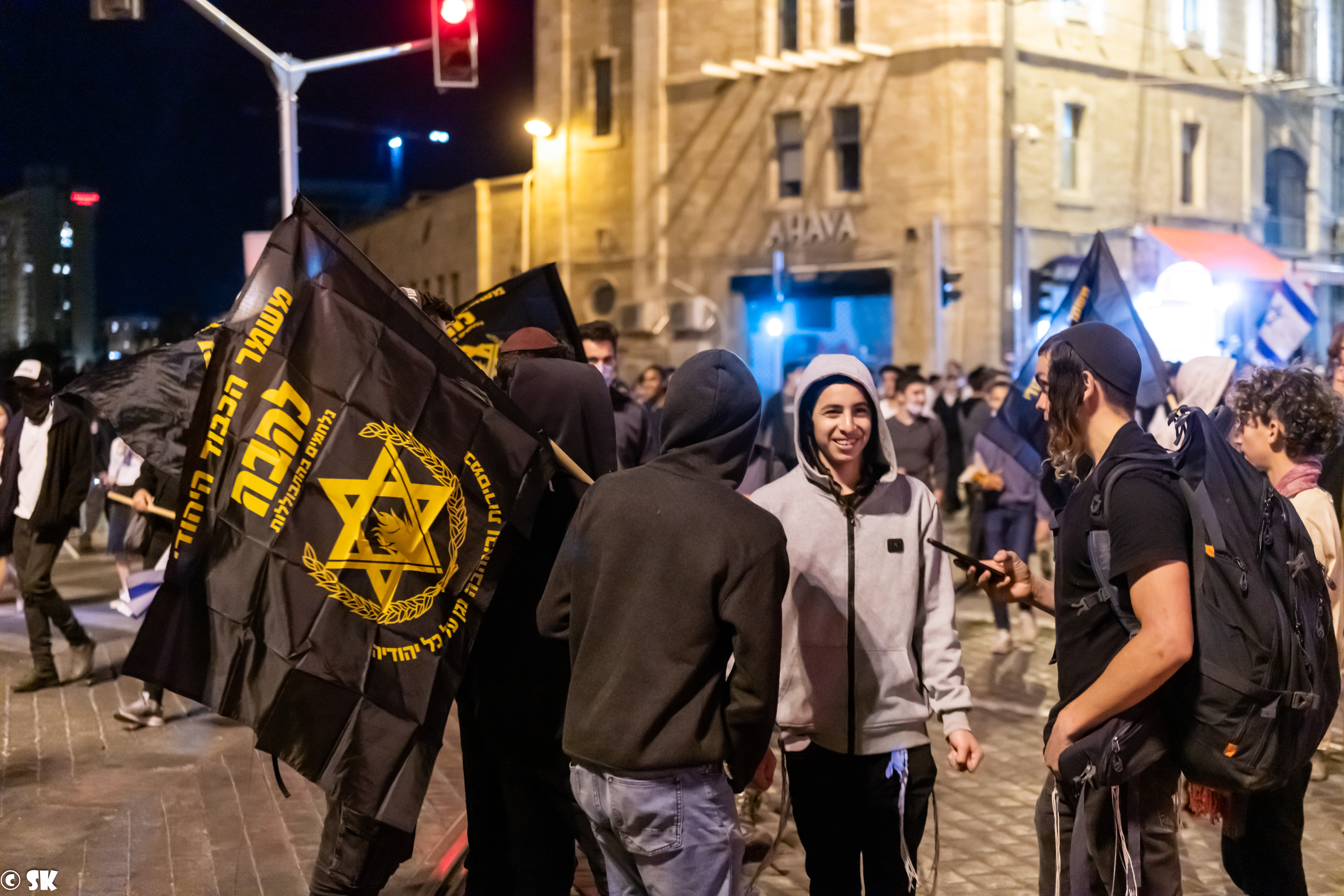
Lehava activist. The inscription on the flag reads "The Jewish Honor Guard / Fighting assimilation / With devotion and love we will protect every Jewish woman." Jerusalem 2023

=== Opposition to interfaith marriages ===
The organization gained notoriety in 2010 after sending an open letter to Israeli Jewish supermodel Bar Refaeli urging her to break off her relationship with American actor Leonardo DiCaprio, who is Roman Catholic.

Multiple rebbetzins, acting on behalf of Lehava, issued an open letter urging Israeli women not to associate with "non-Jews". Haaretz quoted the letter as saying, "Don't date non-Jews, don't work at places that non-Jews frequent, and don't do national service with non-Jews;" the letter implied that if they did so, they would be cut off from their "holy race". The letter caused a controversy and was denounced by other rabbis. When a poll was conducted of Jewish Israelis' reaction to the letters denouncing those who rent or sell homes to non-Jews, 44 per cent of Israeli Jews supported the rabbis' call, while 48 per cent were opposed.

The organization has also spoken out against Mark Zuckerberg's marriage to Priscilla Chan.

In 2014, it organized hostile protests against a mixed couple from Jaffa, objecting to the marriage of Mahmoud Mansour, an Israeli Arab, and his bride-to-be, Morel Malka, who converted from Judaism to Islam ahead of the wedding. The group was reported as saying, "Please come with positive energy and bring loudspeakers and horns. We will ask our sister to return home with us to the Jewish people who are waiting for her", by the Israeli news site Arutz Sheva. When the couple appealed to a court to ban the demonstration, a judgement was handed down allowing the protest to proceed, but no closer than 200 metres away from the site of the ceremony in the Israeli town of Rishon Letzion. Haaretz reported that the protesters chanted "death to leftists" and "death to Arabs", despite one of the organizers trying to calm them down.

In 2013, it started a Facebook page with the purpose of identifying mixed Arab–Jewish couples. Still, the page was shut down in 2014 after there were numerous complaints. It had become a repository of racist comments. Liat Bar-Stav, a journalist who went undercover in the Lehava organization, described how their members looked for Jewish females who might be dating Arabs. If members thought they had discovered any, they would follow Gopstein's instructions: approach the woman, and forward her phone number to the organization for further action. "You approach the girl and say, 'Excuse me, I don't have a phone. May I make a call?' You call your phone, and that's how you get the number", Gopstein explained to the activists he coached.

=== Calls for segregation ===
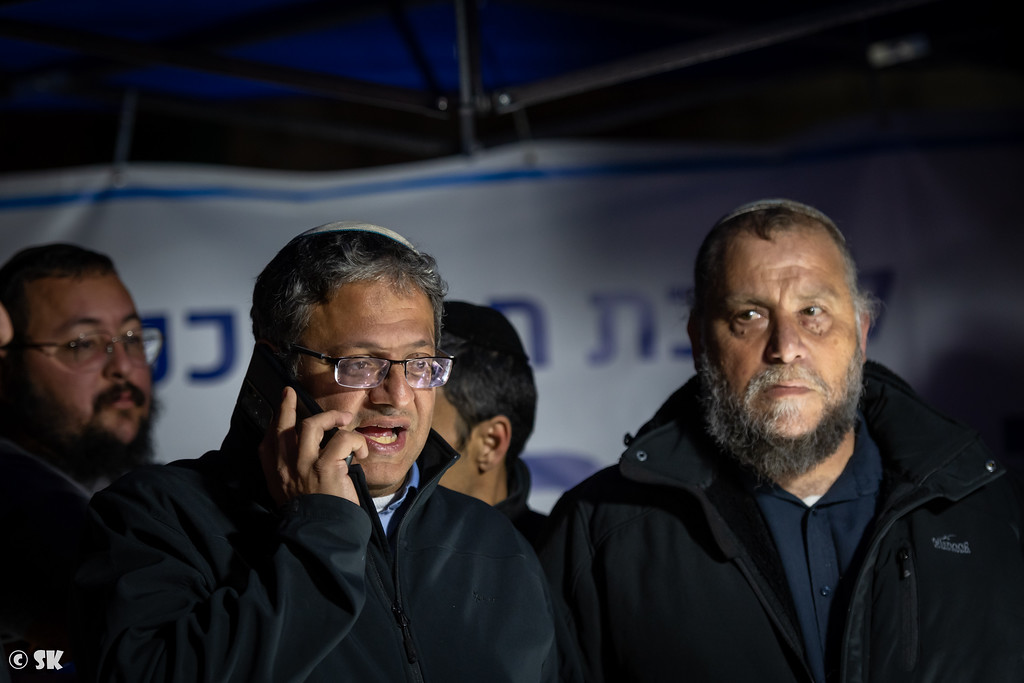
Knesset member Itamar Ben-Gvir and radical right political activist Bentzi Gopstein in Sheikh Jarrah. February 2022

In addition to opposing interfaith marriages, Lehava has encouraged Israelis to report to the organization the names of Jews who rent to Arabs, so that they can be "named and shamed" publicly. In 2012, the group distributed flyers in east Jerusalem warning Arabs not to visit the mostly Jewish western side of the city. It also campaigned against Jews and Arabs mixing on beaches.

In November 2014, four activists in the group were arrested in Petah Tikva after they distributed propaganda material, then attacked and wounded police. Liat Bar-Stav described a meeting that Gopstein led for his followers, in which he said to them, "Some 45 years ago, Rabbi Kahane said, shouted, and cried out that the enemies within us are a cancer, and that if we don't take this cancer and get rid of it, we won't continue to exist. Unfortunately, this dangerous cancer of co-existence has metastasized everywhere. There are various ministers in the government who are encouraging co-existence, who are giving them jobs, allowing them into the hi-tech world, allowing them to become doctors." As the crowd responded with booing and cheering, Gopstein continued: "The cancer we spoke about in the beginning has offshoots in the Knesset of Israel too. Thirty years ago, Rabbi Kahane stood up in the Knesset and took out a hangman's noose for traitors, a noose for the Arab MK who was there. It's not a threat, it's a promise, the rabbi said when attacked for doing so. So this is what I want to wish (former MK Azmi) Bishara on behalf of all of you." At this point, Gopstein waved a noose. "Your day will come, Azmi! We are waiting for the Israeli government to come and hang you from the tallest tree! Azmi, only thanks to Rabbi Kahane will we make sure you are hanged one day."

In December 2014, three members of Lehava were arrested and charged with the 29 November arson at an integrated Arab-Jewish school. The suspects, Yitzhak Gabbai, and brothers Nahman Twito and Shlomo Twito, attacked the school, according to Shin Bet, "because Jews and Arabs learn together at the school, and the goal was to put opposition to co-existence and assimilation in the public eye". In courtroom photos, the three members of the radical group are shown smiling and smirking as they faced charges. Within days of their arrest, police completed a raid on the homes of several Lehava members. Lehava's chairman, Bentzi Gopstein, was among those arrested.

=== Anti-LGBT ===
In 2017, Lehava protested the Jerusalem gay pride parade. Prior to the 2018 march, Gopstein called LGBT activists "terrorists" and urged supporters to counterdemonstrate with banners saying "Jerusalem is not Sodom". Four Lehava supporters were arrested during the parade. In 2020, Lehava urged its supporters to infiltrate the parade.

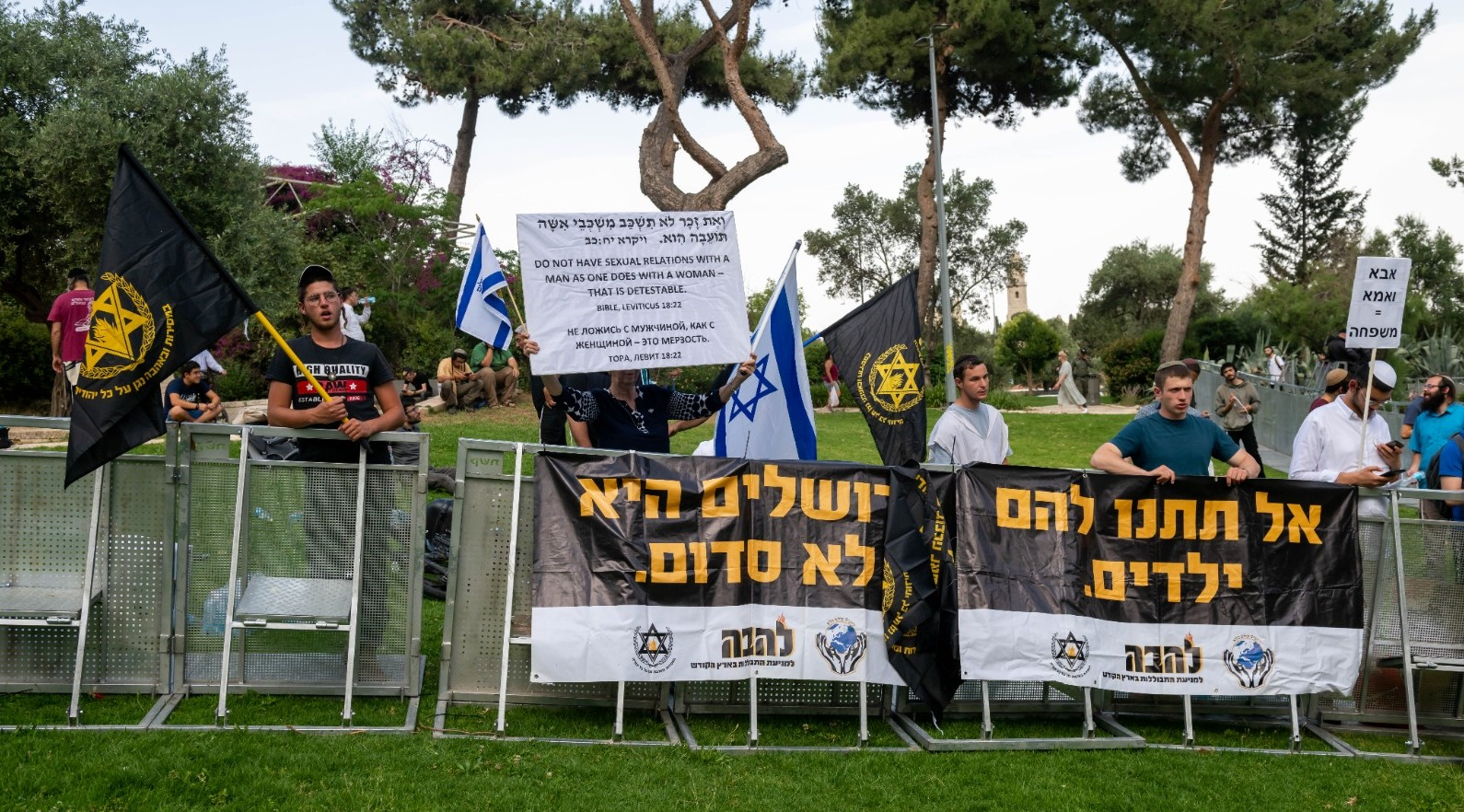
Lehava protest against Jerusalem gay pride parade 2023. Signs: "Don't give them children" and "Jerusalem is not Sedom"

=== Opposition to Christianity in Israel ===
Lehava had organized demonstrations protesting the presence of Christians in Israel, and in late 2015 demonstrated before the Jerusalem International YMCA, with the crowd shouting: "The Arabs won't defeat us with knives, and the Christians won't buy us with presents!" Gopstein wrote an article for a local website, Kooker, in which he declared: "Missionary work must not be given a foothold... Let's throw the vampires out of our land before they drink our blood again." He also called for a ban on the Christmas holiday.

== Opposition to Lehava ==
Israel Religious Action Center (IRAC), the Israeli liberal Judaism primary advocacy organization, asserts that Lehava is racist, and maintains a public relations campaign against Lehava and Gopstein. In May 2016, IRAC stepped up the campaign, releasing statistics showing that Lehava's social media efforts were generating approximately 200,000 anti-Arab hate postings per year to Facebook, Twitter, and Instagram, about a quarter of which call for physical violence against Arabs. Facebook deleted seven Lehava accounts because of improper conduct, but Lehava continues to generate Facebook postings via other accounts.

In May 2016, the Anti-Defamation League sent a letter to Israel's Attorney General Avichai Mendelblit, encouraging action to be taken to curb Lehava and Gopstein. In the letter, the ADL says that Gopstein calls Christians "bloodsucking vampires", condoned burning Christian churches, and that his Facebook page includes anti-LGBT posts, as well as ones the ADL calls "extremely abusive, racist, inflammatory, and violent". The ADL protested Israel's ongoing acceptance of Lehava's "hateful discourse" as detrimental to the country, and that it gives "a weapon [to] Israel's enemies, who use it as a basis for their rushed conclusions and generalizations about Israeli society".

In 2024, the US imposed sanctions on the organization and its leader Bentzi Gopstein, according to this announcement Lehava is "the largest violent extremist organization in Israel ... LEHAVA’s members have engaged in acts of violence against Palestinians, affecting the West Bank".
