= Seharane =

Festival of the Kurdistan Jewish community

Seharane, also spelled Seharaneh, is a multi-day festival celebrated by Kurdish Jews. Although traditionally observed following Passover, in Israel today the festival is observed during the intermediate days of Sukkot.

== Etymology ==
There are several theories as to the etymology of Seharane. One theory says it derives from the Kurdish word sayeran, meaning to see nature. Others relate it to the Aramaic sahar, meaning moon, or the Arabic sayar, meaning a walk.

== Origins ==
Seharane is thought to derive from Newroz, a similar spring festival observed by Kurds of various religions, which was also called Sayeran in Kurdish. Oral histories suggest that although the largest Seharane celebrations occurred at the end of Passover, smaller celebrations were held throughout the year to commemorate holidays and liminal events such as weddings and betrothals. In some communities, the Passover Seharane was celebrated during the intermediate days, rather than at its end.

== Traditional observance ==
The festival's duration differed between communities, with event preparations beginning the first night after Passover ended. In Iranian Kurdistan, Seharane lasted for one day; in other regions, it lasted from two days to a week. Generally, the festival did not have any religious elements besides a community's regular prayer services.

Traditionally, Kurdish Jews would travel to the countryside and set up camps for the festival celebrations. Communities would hire guards to protect the camps for the festival's length. Families would bring food, which they cooked or reheated over campfires and shared with each other. Seharane observances were joyful and social occasions, in which people wore their best clothes and sang, danced (especially in group circle dances, some of which were sex segregated and others of which were mixed gender), and made music with the zurna and dahola. In the evenings, people gathered to tell stories.

During the festival, distinctions of class, age, and gender became less pronounced. Young men and women also were able to spend time more freely with each other, leading to social connections and engagements. The Seharane gatherings were a popular time for fathers to arrange marriages for their daughters, and they often allowed their daughters more influence during the event.

Local Muslims also participated in some celebrations, either being hosted by their neighbors or visiting the site to sell wares.

Another aspect of the holiday was to visit the graves of "righteous elders".

== Contemporary observance ==
The Kurdish Jewish community was almost entirely relocated to Israel in the early 1950s, through Operation Ezra and Nehemiah. Following this, observance of Seharane largely stopped for the next twenty years, due to the community being scattered across the country. Some families did host modest celebrations near their homes, limited both by their financial situations and by access to transportation. Other Kurdish Jews, aiming to assimilate into Israeli society, gave up the celebration altogether. The festival was revived in the 1970s, as part of a larger move to revive cultural traditions and festivals, by the newly formed National Council of the Association of Kurdish Jewry. The council decided to move the festival from its traditional timing after Passover to the intermediate days of Sukkot, in order to avoid conflicts with Mimouna, a Maghrebi Jewish festival which also takes place after Passover.

A Seharane festival was established in 1972, which has been held annually. The festival offers an opportunity for Israeli politicians to interact with the community, as well as a way for Kurdish Jews to connect to the rest of the Kurdish diaspora; multiple times over the years, non-Jewish Kurds have been invited to participate.

In the years since, the occasion has led to public celebrations, during which many people choose to picnic.

== In popular culture ==
In September 2019, the Israel Postal Company issued a series of stamps commemorating Seharane.
