= Hand in Hand: Center for Jewish–Arab Education in Israel =

Israeli network for integrated Jewish–Arab bilingual schools

- יד ביד: המרכז לחינוך יהודי ערבי בישראל (Hebrew); يدا بيد: مركز التربية اليهودي العربي في إسرائيل (Arabic)
- Formation: 1998
- Founder: Amin Khalaf; Lee Gordon
- Fields: Education
- CEO: Dani Elazar
- Website: handinhandk12.org

Hand in Hand: Center for Jewish–Arab Education in Israel (Hebrew: יד ביד: המרכז לחינוך יהודי ערבי בישראל, Arabic: يدا بيد: مركز التربية اليهودي العربي في إسرائيل) is a network of integrated, bilingual schools serving Jewish and Arab children in Israel. Hand in Hand was co-founded by Israeli Arab educator Amin Khalaf and Israeli-American educator Lee Gordon in 1998.

Hand in Hand serves more than 2,000 students in six elementary schools, five preschools, two middle schools and one high school, all of which operate under the wider umbrella of the Israeli public school system. Schools are located in Jerusalem, the Galilee, Wadi Ara, Haifa, Tel Aviv, and Kfar Saba.

== Leadership and operations ==
As of 2023, Hand in Hand's chief executive was Dani Elazar.

Hand in Hand receives government funding, which it subsidizes with donations and tuition costs to allow for the hiring of more staff to ensure the bilingual environment.

== Mission ==
Hand in Hand's mission is to create a strong and inclusive shared society in Israel through its network of integrated, bilingual schools and communities. By modeling an equal shared society of Jewish and Arabs students, parents, and educators, Hand in Hand aims to inspires support for social inclusion and civic equality.

== History ==
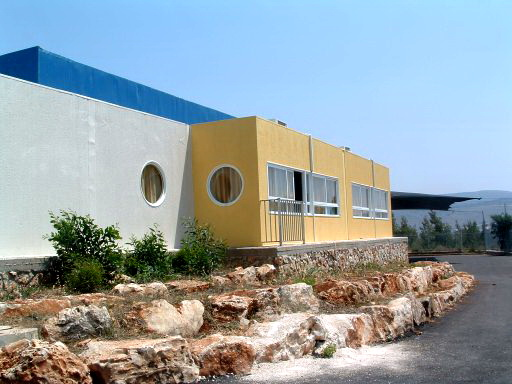
Hand in Hand's Galilee School

Students from Hand in Hand's Galilee School

Hand in Hand was founded in 1998 with two preschools; one in the Galilee region, near the Misgav Regional Council and one in Jerusalem.

=== Jerusalem campus ===
On October 21, 2007, Hand in Hand's Max Rayne Jerusalem School opened in Jerusalem's Pat neighborhood near the Arab village Beit Safafa. The new campus was built with $11 million from donors including the Jerusalem Foundation, the Rayne Foundation, and other European donors.

==== 2014 arson attack ====
In November 2014 the Hand in Hand Max Rayne School was subjected to an arson attack described as a racially motivated hate crime. The school was defaced with anti-Arab graffiti such as "Death to Arabs" and "Kahane was right!" Shortly thereafter, the "Tag Meir" coexistence organization held a support rally to counter those who threaten Arab-Jewish cooperation and promoting racism in Israel. Mohamad Marzouk, former Director of the Hand in Hand Communities Department, noted that the attack brought out a show of community support for the school. In the minds of many people the attack, he said, "crossed a red line." The Israeli police arrested a number of suspects in connection with the arson attack.

Following the arrest, the mother of one of the arsonists said she would have done the same if it was not illegal. She expressed disgust that Jews and Arabs studied together at the school. In 2018, one of the arsonists, Yitzhak Gabai, appeared on a Channel 14 talk show that was harshly criticized and led to an apology by Channel 14.

===== Aftermath =====
Following the attack, former Israeli President Reuven Rivlin, along with his wife Nechama, invited Hand in Hand first graders to his official residence along with their teachers. He told them: "I am excited to welcome you to the President’s Residence. You are proof that we can live side by side in peace, and we must not let difficult experiences - such as the one you have been through - harm our belief in our ability to coexist."

=== Wadi Ara campus ===
In the summer of 2003, a group of Jewish and Arab parents from the Wadi Ara region joined Hand in Hand in establishing a third bilingual school in their region.

=== Kfar Qara campus ===
After delays, which included difficulty earning recognition from the Israeli Ministry of Education, the "Bridge over the Wadi" (Gesher al HaWadi, Hebrew: גשר על הואדי) school opened its doors on September 1, 2004, with 106 students. This is Hand in Hand's first and only school located in an Arab town, Kfar Qara.

=== Haifa campus ===
In 2012, Hand in Hand opened its first bilingual preschool in Haifa, with the help of committed local parents.

In 2013, the Ministry of Education denied accreditation to the Haifa school, forcing it to operate as a private school for the year.

In 2016 Hand in Hand launched its first elementary school in Haifa, which expanded to a middle school in 2022. That same year, the Hand in Hand Haifa School received full recognition from the Ministry of Education, as well as its own independent building.

=== Jaffa campus ===
In 2013, Hand in Hand launched its first bilingual school in Jaffa with just 35 preschools. The "Kulna Yachad" School is now a full-fledged elementary school serving hundreds of students, pre-K through 6th grade.

=== Kfar Saba campus ===
In 2015, an integrated bilingual preschool was founded in Kfar Saba, on the Beit Berl College campus, serving 37 students from Jewish and Arab towns in the Triangle. The Kfar Saba school is also now a full-fledged elementary school, serving students ages preschool through 6th grade.

== International recognition ==
=== United States ===
In December 2014, the White House commissioned a menorah made by students at the Hand in Hand Max Rayne Jerusalem school and invited two of its students to join U.S. President Barack Obama and First Lady Michelle Obama as they welcomed over 500 guests to the White House Hannukkah celebration. Each of the branches on the multi-colored wooden menorah represents one of the schools' values: Community, Education, Freedom, Human Dignity, Peace, Equality, Solidarity, and Friendship. President Obama said: "(These) students teach us an important lesson for this time in our history. The light of hope must outlast the fires of hate. That’s what the Hannukkah story teaches us. It’s what our young people can teach us — that one act of faith can make a miracle, that love is stronger than hate, that peace can triumph over conflict."

Prior to its closing in 2025, USAID provided some funding to Hand in Hand. In 2012, it provided the network with a grant of one million dollars to be used to seed three new campuses.

== Educational philosophy ==
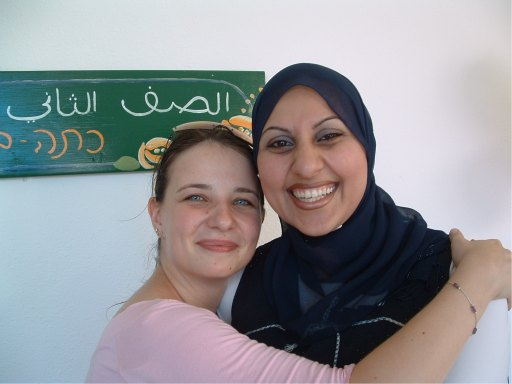
Two Hand in Hand teachers

In Israel, Jewish and Arab citizens lead largely separate lives, lacking meaningful opportunities to get to know one another, and overcome social and cultural barriers. This separation is particularly obvious in the K-12 public education system, which separates students into Arab and Jewish (secular, religious, and Orthodox) tracks. Although children may legally attend either type of school, in reality few Arab children attend Jewish schools (where the primary language of instruction is Hebrew), and essentially no Jewish children attend Arab schools (where the primary language of instruction is Arabic). The separation between these communities, and the barriers to communication carry over to other aspects of adult life.

Hand in Hand serves both Jewish and Arab children with a values-based bilingual education rooted in equality, inclusion, and peace. Their educational philosophy is based in the notion that studying together in an inclusive environment, and learning one another's language, narrative, and history, will allow these children to view members of the other group in a more compassionate and nuanced way.

Hand in Hand utilizes pedagogic models such as project-based learning, place-based education, and problem-based learning to enhance students' critical thinking, independent research skills, and creativity. The Hand in Hand Education Department develops curricula in Hebrew and Arabic tailored to multicultural themes and texts, and provides training for its Jewish and Arab teachers.

== Shared communities ==
In 2012, Hand in Hand established its Communities Department. The Community Department organizes events and activities throughout the year for the Jewish and Arab families in each school in order to build a strong, inclusive community that supports that growth of each school. With core funding from the U.S. Agency for International Development (USAID), Hand in Hand launched communities surrounding all six schools. These communities are engaged in a wide variety of activities, including joint holiday celebrations, workshops, tours, family bonding activities, language and history lessons, dialogue sessions, volunteer work, and even lobbying local municipalities to continue their support for each school. These activities not only strengthen the community surrounding each school, but also inspire wider support for a Jewish-Arab shared society across Israel.

In 2021, Hand in Hand launched their "Student University Community," an integrated program for Jewish and Arab university students in Jerusalem who are interested in learning, participating in dialogue, and engaging in volunteer work together.

== Awards ==
Hand in Hand has won multiple awards in recognition of its bilingual education and the societal impact of its work.

=== Domestic ===
In 2016, the Hand in Hand Wadi Ara school was awarded the "District Education Prize" for its success in combining academic excellence with critical thinking and the promotion of tolerance and mutual respect. The district’s prize committee declared that the school “has a significant impact and is changing the direction of education in Israel.” Also in 2016, the prestigious Jerusalem Education Prize, which is awarded to schools that have a magnified impact on their students, families and the city around them, was awarded to the Hand in Hand Max Rayne Jerusalem school. The prize committee declared that the school acts as “an example to all the residents of Jerusalem".

In 2019, the Tel Aviv-Jaffa Municipality honored the Hand in Hand Jaffa School with the city’s Values-Based Education Award for outstanding achievement in bringing its ideals to life. That same year, the Jerusalem Municipality declared the Hand in Hand Jerusalem Max Rayne High School to be among the top eight high schools in the city, noted for academic excellence, quality of pedagogy, and civil service.

In 2021, the Galilee School earned the Israeli President's annual certificate of distinction for Hope in Israeli Education for its outstanding success in promoting true dialogue and partnership between Arabs and Jews, and in advancing social change through multicultural interactions, humanistic education, and partnership across populations. The award is given each year to schools that are leaders in forging partnership between the different sectors of Israeli society.

In 2022, The Hand in Hand Galilee School received the highest accolade of Israel’s education system: the National Education Prize from the Ministry of Education. This award was given to only 12 out of more than 2,000 schools nationwide. That same year, the Ministry of Education also named the Hand in Hand Galilee school the best elementary school in the north of Israel for its educational excellence and innovative pedagogy.

=== International ===
In 2007, the Institute of International Education awarded the Victor J. Goldberg IIE Prize for Peace in the Middle East to Hand in Hand founders Amin Khalaf and Lee Gordon.

In February 2022, Hand in Hand was selected as one of three winners of the Global Pluralism Award, bestowed by the Global Centre for Pluralism, in Canada. The winners were selected from among hundreds of candidates from more than 70 countries, by an independent, international jury chaired by the Rt. Honorable Joe Clark, former Prime Minister of Canada. The following text accompanied the award announcement: “The Global Pluralism Award recognizes pluralism in action. It celebrates the extraordinary achievements of organizations, individuals and governments who are tackling the challenge of living peacefully and productively with diversity.”

In November 2023, T4 Education, a global network of over 200,000 educators, named The Hand in Hand Max Rayne Jerusalem School as the top school in the world in ‘Overcoming Adversity’. The prize celebrates educational institutions that make a significant and long-lasting impact on students, their community, and wider society.

== See also ==
- Givat Haviva - a left-wing, shared society oriented educational institute in Israel
- HaKfar HaYarok - a youth village in Israel, with a number of progressive educational institutions
- Neve Shalom - a cooperative village jointly founded by Israeli Jews and Palestinian-Israeli Arabs
