= Death to Arabs =

Anti-Arab slogan

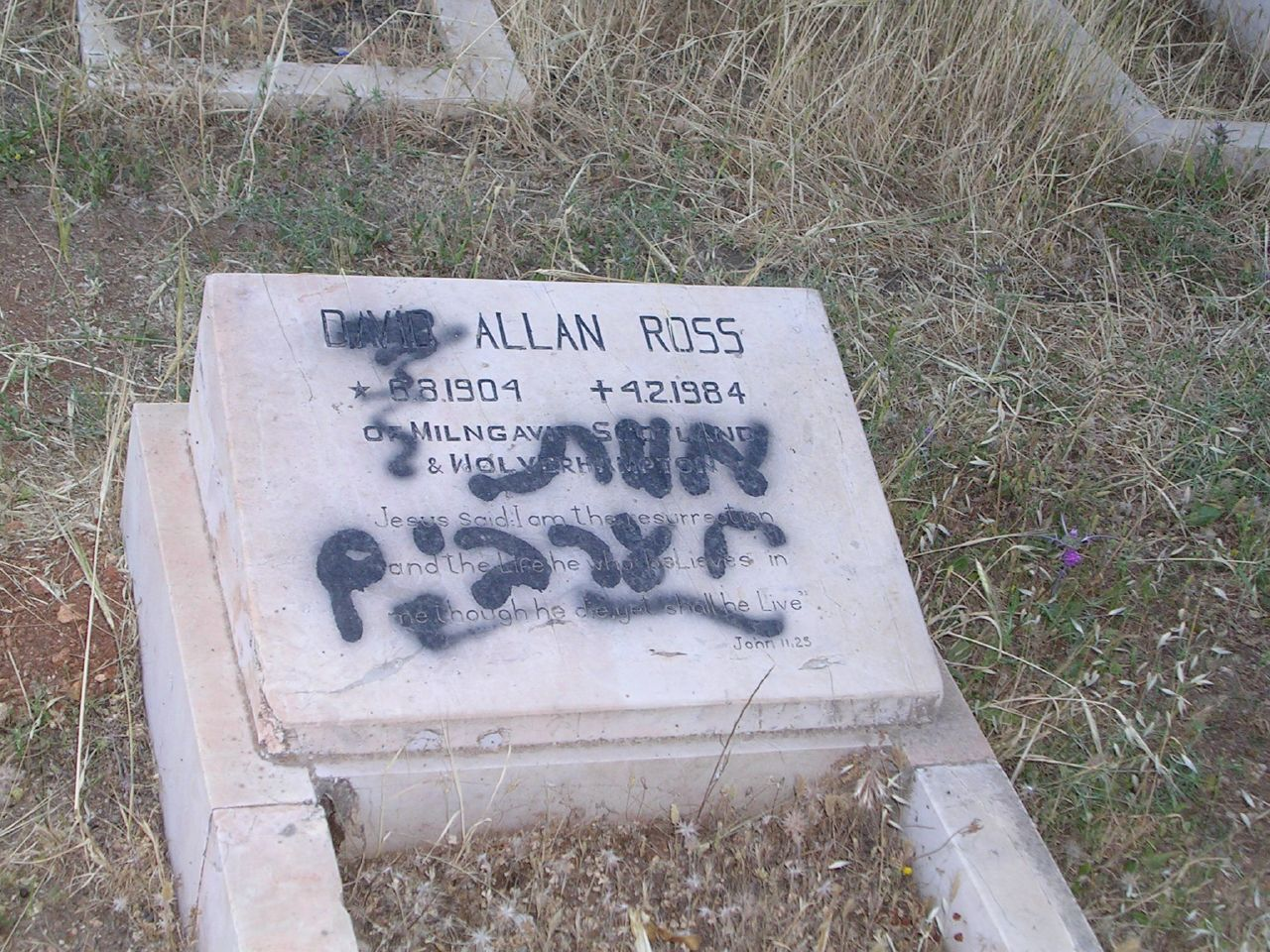
Desecration of a Christian grave in Bethlehem shortly after the Second Intifada. The graffiti reads "Death to the Arabs" in Hebrew.

"Death to Arabs" or "Death to the Arabs" (Israeli Hebrew: מָוֶת לָעֲרָבִים, romanized: Mávet la'Aravím) is an anti-Arab slogan originating in Israel. It is often used during protests and civil disturbances across Israel, the West Bank, and to a lesser extent, the Gaza Strip. Depending on the person's temperament, it may specifically be an expression of anti-Palestinianism or otherwise a broader expression anti-Arab sentiment, which includes non-Palestinian Arabs. It is widely condemned, with some observers asserting that it manifests genocidal intent. Outside of Israel, it had also been used by SPLA militants during the Second Sudanese Civil War.

== History ==
In 1980, it was reported that "death to Arabs" had been written on one of the entrances to the University of Haifa, along with swastikas. At the same time, the YESH movement was calling for the expulsion of Arab students.

Meir Kahane's followers held rallies in Jerusalem during which "death to Arabs" was shouted. In 1989, Kahane's Kach party was banned due to its advocacy of racism. Lehava members shout "death to Arabs" during rallies. During the October 2000 riots, Israeli Jews violently attacked Arabs, shouting "death to Arabs"; two Arabs were killed. In 2009, it was reported that Yisrael Beiteinu party members had gathered on roads in the Galilee during the party's conference and were shouting "death to Arabs" to passing cars. On 16 August 2012, a seventeen-year-old Palestinian, Jamal Julani, was nearly beaten to death in Zion Square by Jewish teenagers who were shouting "death to Arabs". After the 2015 killing of Fadi Alloun in Jerusalem, settlers shouted "death to Arabs" in front of his body. When Elor Azaria was tried for the extrajudicial killing of a disarmed Palestinian who lay wounded on the ground after he had been shot and disarmed following an attempted stabbing of an Israeli soldier earlier, people at mass demonstrations chanted "death to the Arabs". One poll found that 65 percent of Israeli Jews approved of the killing.

Since the late 1990s, "death to Arabs" has been a commonly heard slogan in Israeli football stadiums. Beitar Jerusalem, a football club known for anti-Arab fans, routinely has supporters shout "death to Arabs". Following the normalisation of relations between Israel and the UAE in 2020, Sheikh Hamad bin Khalifa Al Nahyan, an Emirati businessman, announced plans to purchase a 50 percent stake in the club. Co-owner Moshe Hogeg said the new arrangement was an attempt to recast the club's image. However, the deal did not proceed, and collapsed in 2022 following claims of financial misconduct and Hogeg being accused of sex crimes.

"Death to Arabs" is commonly used in graffiti and has been observed after price tag attacks.

It is used by mobs in reaction to the killing of Israelis, wanting revenge. Palestinians have a mirror phrase, Itbah al-Yehud [butcher the Jew].

The nationalist Jerusalem Day marches commemorate the 1967 occupation of East Jerusalem. The "death to Arabs" slogan is heard during these marches, such as marches which were held in 2015, 2021, 2024, and 2025.

== Reactions ==
Israeli sociologist Amir Ben-Porat explains the use of "death to Arabs" in the context both of changes in the Israeli–Palestinian conflict as well as the belief of many Israelis that Arab citizens of Israel should leave the country. He states that the slogan "originates and draws support from certain components of the ongoing political culture in Israel". The proliferation of the use of the slogan coincided with calls from the political right to expel Arab citizens of Israel. According to Haaretz writer Or Kashti, increasing use of the slogan by youth indicates the success more than the failure of the Israeli education system. According to Ian S. Lustick, the phrase and other similar ones "mimic Nazi slogans and German behavior in minds attuned to Holocaustia".

Legal scholar Nadera Shalhoub-Kevorkian says that messages such as "death to Arabs" are "part of the settler colonial aesthetic landscape" of Palestinian spaces, and that they "converge to produce a violent aesthetic atmosphere for the colonized and legitimate crimes against them". Anat Rimon-Or has argued that the slogan—associated with the Mizrahi working class—causes more upset in liberal Israeli Jewish society than Arab deaths inflicted by Israelis.

Nooran Alhamdan of the Middle East Institute points to a double standard: "Palestinians are constantly forced to clarify what they mean by 'from the river to the sea,' and even when clarified have their intentions assumed, meanwhile a significant portion of Israeli society finds nothing wrong with 'death to Arabs' and we're told 'they don't really mean that'". Nadim Houry, the director of the Arab Reform Initiative, says that while groups of Israelis shouting "death to Arabs" are "portrayed as marginal phenomenon in Israeli society", when a "Palestinian or Arab says something hateful, [the] whole society [is] deemed violent." Jamaal Bowman, a U.S. representative from New York, commented: "This is a genocidal chant. Let's call it what it is."

== See also ==
- "Khaybar Khaybar ya yahud"
- "Death to America"
- "Death to Israel"
- "From the river to the sea"
- "Dubul' ibhunu"
- "Remove Kebab"
- List of ethnic slurs
