= List of sanctions involving Israel =

This is a list of economic sanctions involving Israel.

== Background ==
In the US, Israeli settler violence received greater attention by the Biden administration following the outbreak of the Gaza war in October 2023. While rights groups demanded US Secretary of State Antony Blinken punish Israeli settlement groups for their actions against Palestinians in the West Bank, others believed that the sanctions did not go far enough because the Israeli government supports the settlements itself. During a visit to Israel on 30 November, Blinken raised concerns over the lack of action by the Israeli government regarding violent settlers. On 5 December 2023, Blinken introduced new visa restrictions regarding entry to the US of persons who committed acts of violence in the West Bank. On 1 February 2024, President Biden issued an executive order due to high levels of settler violence, forced displacement of Palestinians, and property destruction in the West Bank. The order imposed sanctions on foreign persons determined to be responsible for or complicit in actions that threaten the peace, security, or stability of the West Bank. It blocked their property interests in the US, suspends their entry into the country and prohibits transactions with sanctioned persons. The stated objective is to address events regarded by the administration as "an unusual and extraordinary threat" undermining US foreign policy objectives and threatening security in the region.

In Europe, sanctions were announced in February 2024 by the United Kingdom against extremist Israeli settlers who have violently attacked Palestinians in the West Bank. The sanctions included financial and travel restrictions with four settlers being sanctioned initially after documentation showed they engaged in systematic intimidation and violence against Palestinians; at times at gunpoint, to make them leave their homes.

Further sanctions against violent settlers were announced by the European Union on 19 April 2024, as the European Council blacklisted the right-wing organizations Lehava and Hilltop Youth and the individuals Meir Ettinger, Elisha Yered, Neria Ben Pazi and Yinon Levi. Because of violence against Palestinians in the West Bank and Jerusalem on 28 February, France imposed sanctions against extremist Israeli settlers, including a ban on entering French territory. Also, Emanuel Macron's office said they are considering extending sanctions on Israeli settlers.

In May 2025, the United Kingdom, France, and Canada threatened sanctions against Israel over Israel's blockade of humanitarian aid to the Gaza Strip. In an open letter to British Prime Minister Keir Starmer on 26 May 2025, more than 800 lawyers, university professors and former judges called on the British government to impose sanctions on the Israeli government and its ministers and take steps to "prevent and punish genocide" in Gaza.

Czech Prime Minister Petr Fiala described the Czech Republic as "Israel's voice in Europe" and systematically opposed UN and European Union resolutions that criticized Israel's actions or sought sanctions against Israel.

In May 2025, Dutch Foreign Minister Caspar Veldkamp argued that Israel's blockade of the Gaza Strip was a violation of international law and therefore of the EU–Israel Association Agreement. There were increasing calls for the full suspension of the association agreement. On 15 July 2025, the EU's top diplomat Kaja Kallas and the foreign ministers of the EU member states decided not to take any action against Israel over alleged Israeli war crimes in the Gaza war and settler violence in the West Bank. The proposed sanctions against Israel included suspending the EU-Israel Association Agreement, suspending visa-free travel, or blocking imports from Israeli settlements. Israel considered the EU's decision not to impose sanctions on Israel as a diplomatic victory.

As of June 2026, Israeli National Security Minister Itamar Ben-Gvir and Finance Minister Bezalel Smotrich are the most high-profile Israeli nationals to face sanctions.

In September 2025, Belgium enacted an entry ban for ministers Ben-Gvir and Smotrich, who had been previously banned by Slovenia; The United Kingdom; the Netherlands; and others, and banned imports from the illegal Israeli settlements, and implemented an arms embargo, including dual-use materials when the end user would be military. It also restricted consular services in respect of Belgians living in the settlements to exclusively include emergency aid, and requested a legal advice on banning Israeli's living in the settlements from receiving a D-visa, and requested that Belgians or people permanently residing in Belgium, who have committed severe violations of international law or terrorist offences, be prosecuted by the Federal prosecutor's office. Shortly afterwards, Spain also banned the two ministers and the Netherlands expanded its travel ban for the ministers to a restriction applying to the entire Schengen area. In May and June 2026, Ireland followed and France added an entry ban for Ben-Gvir.

In May 2026, the Dutch government announced a plan to sanction the illegal Israeli settlements, by banning trade in goods from these settlements, as well as intermediate services having to do with goods from the settlements. The measure was planned to come into effect on 22 September. On 8 July, after the critical advice by the Council of State in June, the Second Chamber's foreign affairs committee asked more than a hundred questions about the proposed decision. The prohibition on trade with the illegal settlements went into effect 22 september 2026.

Polish ministers are deliberating an entry ban for Ben-Gvir according to Reuters.

In June 2026, the newly appointed government of Slovenia reversed many of the measures its predecessor had placed on Israel: the arms embargo, the 'persona non grata' declarations for prime minister Netanyahu and ministers Smotrich and Ben-Gvir as well as the ban on products imported from the West Bank settlements.

On 9 June 2026, Liza Rozovsky of Haaretz reported that the U.K. and "several other countries" were going to announce new sanctions on "six Israeli right-wing organizations and one far-right activist", including a "non-binding recommenation on trade with Israeli settlements". According to Rozovsky, Regavim would not be included. Canada, part of this group, announced its fifth round of sanctions the same day. Unlike the UK's list, this did include Regavim On the same day, Norway, another partner mentioned by the UK, announced it would sanction the individuals and entities the EU's sanctions dated 28 May 2026, and on top of that "decided to introduce entry bans on more than 20 violent settlers". On 19 June, Norway also announced a plan to ban trade with the Israeli settlements in the occupied Palestinian territories.

On September 8, 2026, the British government accused Israeli settlers of ethnic cleansing of Palestinians in the West Bank, and decided to prohibit all trade with the settlements.

== Individuals ==
Picture	Names	By	Actions	Reason	Date	Source
	David Chai Chasdei	United States Australia Canada	Travel ban, asset freezes and financial prohibitions (Canada)	violence against Palestinians in the West Bank	February 2024 May 2024 (Canada) July 2024 (Australia)	
Umm al Kheir (West Bank), August 4, 2025. Israeli settler Yinon Levy in a photograph.	Yinon Levi	United States United Kingdom European Union Japan Australia Canada	Travel bans (EU, UK, Canada, Australia) and asset freezes (UK, Canada), financial prohibitions, (Canada) Director Disqualification Sanction (UK) Financial sanction (EU, Australia)	violence against Palestinians in the West Bank	2024	
	Bentzi Gopstein	United States Canada European Union Singapore Australia	Travel bans, asset freezes (EU, Canada, Singapore) and financial prohibitions (Canada) Financial sanction (EU, Singapore, Australia)	violence against Palestinians in the West Bank, founder of Lehava	2024, June 2026 (Australia)	
	Daniella Weiss	Canada United Kingdom European Union Australia	Travel ban, asset freezes and financial prohibitions (Canada and EU)	violence against Palestinians in the West Bank, directing and supporting Nachala	2024 (Canada) 2025 (United Kingdom) May 2026 (EU) November 2026 (Australia)	
	Elisha Yered	Canada European Union Australia United Kingdom Singapore	Travel bans, (Canada, EU, US, Singapore, Australia) asset freezes, (Canada, UK) financial prohibitions (Canada) Director Disqualification Sanction (UK), Financial sanction (EU, Singapore, Australia)	violence against Palestinians in the West Bank	May 2024 (United Kingdom) June 2024 July 2024 (Australia)	
	Ely Federman	Canada United Kingdom	Travel bans and Asset freezes (UK, Canada), and financial prohibitions (Canada) Director Disqualification Sanction (UK)	violence against Palestinians in the West Bank	June 2024	
	Meir Mordechai Ettinger	Canada European Union Australia Singapore	Travel bans (Canada, EU, Singapore, Australia), asset freezes and financial prohibitions (Canada) Financial sanction (EU, Singapore, Australia)	violence against Palestinians in the West Bank; responsible for serious human rights abuses against Palestinians	April 2024 (EU); June 2024 (Canada); July 2024 (Australia)	
	Einan Tanjil	United States Canada Australia	Travel ban, asset freezes and financial prohibitions (Canada)	violence against Palestinians in the West Bank	2024	
	Shalom Zicherman	United States Canada	Travel ban, asset freezes and financial prohibitions (Canada)	violence against Palestinians in the West Bank	2024	
	Moshe Sharvit	United States United Kingdom Japan Canada, Australia European Union	Travel bans and asset freezes (UK, Canada), and financial prohibitions, (Canada) Director Disqualification Sanction (UK)	attacks and intimidation of Palestinians in the West Bank	March 2024 May 2024 (Canada) July 2024 (EU) June 2026 (Australia)	
	Zvi Bar Yosef	United States United Kingdom Japan Australia Canada European Union	Travel bans and asset freezes (UK, Canada), and financial prohibitions, (Canada) Director Disqualification Sanction (UK)	attempts to engage in violence against Palestinians in the West Bank.	March 2024 May 2024 (Canada) July 2024 (Australia) July 2024 (EU)	
	Noam Federman	United Kingdom Canada	Travel ban, asset freezes and financial prohibitions (Canada)	radical settler activist and former leader and spokesperson of the now-defunct Kach party	May 2024 September 2024 (Canada)	
	Neria ben Pazi	Japan European Union Australia Canada United Kingdom	Travel bans (Canada, EU), asset freezes and financial prohibitions (Canada), Financial sanction (EU)	violence against Palestinians in the West Bank	May 2024 (United Kingdom) July 2024 September 2024 (Canada)	
	Isaschar Manne	European Union	Financial sanction and travel ban (EU)	Founded the unauthorized Manne farm outpost in the South Hebron Hills	July 2024	
	Baruch Marzel	European Union; Singapore	Financial sanction and travel ban (EU, Singapore)	Member of the far-right political party "Otzma Yehudit". Formerly leader of the Kahane party that was banned by the Israeli authorities in 1994.	July 2024 (EU) November 2025 (Singapore)	
	Eden Levi	Canada United Kingdom Australia	Travel bans and asset freezes (UK, Canada), and financial prohibitions (Canada) Director Disqualification Sanction (UK)	participating in or facilitating acts of harassment and violence	September 2024 June 2026 (Australia)	
	Shlomo Sarid	Canada	Travel ban, asset freezes and financial prohibitions (Canada)	participating in or facilitating acts of harassment and violence	September 2024	
	Eitan Yardeni	United States		violence against Palestinians in the West Bank	October 2024	
	Avichai Suissa	United StatesEuropean Union	Asset freeze, travel ban, financial prohibitions (EU)	violence against Palestinians in the West Bank, (US) leader of Hashomer Yosh/Hilltop Youth, facilitating and encouraging serious human rights abuses and supporting outposts founded by designated individuals (EU)	October 2024 (US), May 2026 (EU)	
	Shabtai Koshlevsky	United States		role in violence against civilians or in destruction or expropriation in the West Bank.	November 2024	
	Zohar Sabah	United States United Kingdom		threats and violence against Palestinians, including in their homes, and a school (US) Acts of aggression and violence against Palestinian individuals (UK)	November 2024 May 2025	
	Harel David "Coco" Libi	United KingdomCanada	entry ban and financial prohibitions	acts of aggression and violence against Palestinian individuals, owner of Libi Construction and Infrastructure	May 2025 (UK) June 2026 (Canada)	
	Eliav Libi	CanadaAustralia	entry ban and financial prohibitions (Canada)	Director of Libi Construction and Infrastructure, '[accelerating] the expansion of settlements in the West Bank through his construction company.'	June 2026 (Canada), November 2026 (Australia)	
	Itamar Ben-Gvir	United Kingdom Canada Australia New Zealand Norway Slovenia (until June 2026) Netherlands Spain Schengen Zone (de facto) France Poland (five-year entry ban) Ireland	travel or entry bans,	Aggression and violence against Palestinian individuals in the West Bank, "unacceptable actions toward French and European citizens aboard the Global Sumud flotilla."	June 2025, July 2025, September 2025 May 2026 (France) June 2026 (Ireland)	
	Bezalel Smotrich	United Kingdom Canada Australia New Zealand Norway Slovenia (until June 2026) Netherlands Spain Schengen Zone (de facto) Ireland	travel bans,	Aggression and violence against Palestinian individuals in the West Bank	June 2025, July 2025, September 2025, June 2026	
	Meir Deutsch	European Union	Travel ban, asset freezes and financial prohibitions	director of Regavim (NGO)	May 2026	
	Itamar Yehuda Levi	United KingdomAustralia	Asset freeze, (UK) Director Disqualification Sanction, (UK) travel ban (UK)	owner of Eyal Hari Yehuda	June 2026 (UK), November 2026 (Australia)	

== Bodies ==
Picture	Name	By	Actions	Reason	Date	Source
	Tsav 9	United States; European UnionUnited Kingdom	Financial sanction, (EU) Asset freeze, Director Disqualification Sanction (UK)	disrupting aid, serious human rights abuses (EU), "Obstruction of the delivery or distribution of, or access to, humanitarian assistance. Specifically, TZAV 9 is an Israeli activist movement whose stated mission has been to stop humanitarian aid entering the Gaza Strip, and which has organised and carried out blockades of crossings, ports and roads used by humanitarian aid convoys bound for Gaza." (UK)	February 2024 15 July 2024 (EU) 17 November 2026 (UK)	
	Amana	Canada United States United Kingdom European Union Australia	Asset freezes (Canada, UK) and financial prohibitions (Canada) Director Disqualification Sanction (UK)	extremist settler violence against civilians in West Bank, causing "widespread displacement" and "dispossession" of Palestinians and Palestinian property	June 2024 (Canada) October 2024 (United Kingdom) Began November 2024, rescinded January 2025 (US) May 2026 (EU) November 2026 (Australia)	
	Hilltop Youth	United States Canada European Union Australia	Asset freezes and financial prohibitions (Canada)	involved in deadly attacks against Palestinians in 2015 and 2023	June 2024 July 2024 (Australia)	
	Lehava	Australia United States United Kingdom European Union Canada	Asset freezes and financial prohibitions (Canada)	engaged in destabilizing violence affecting the West Bank	2001, 2025 (Australia), April 2024 June 2024 (Canada)	
	Mount Hebron Fund	United States Canada	Asset freezes and financial prohibitions (Canada)	launching fundraising campaigns in support of sanctioned extremists	April 2024 (US) September 2024 (Canada)	
	Shlom Asiraich	United States Canada	Asset freezes and financial prohibitions (Canada)	launching fundraising campaigns in support of sanctioned extremists	April 2024 (US) September 2024 (Canada)	
	NSO Group	United States		spyware	November 2021	
	Od Yosef Chai	United Kingdom	Asset freeze, Director Disqualification Sanction	encouraging violence against non-Jews	October 2024	
	Hashomer Yosh	United States United Kingdom European Union Australia	Asset freeze,(UK, EU) Director Disqualification Sanction (UK), financial prohibition (EU)	Providing material support to an unauthorized outpost in the West Bank that is already under sanctions, Supporting at least 28 violent outposts and settlements	August 2024 (US) October 2024 (United Kingdom) May 2026 (EU) November 2026 (Australia)	
	Nachala	United Kingdom European Union Canada Australia	Asset freeze, financial prohibitions (EU, Canada)	threatening, perpetrating, promoting and supporting, acts of aggression and violence against Palestinian individuals, encouraging and facilitating "coercive acts"	May 2025 (UK) May 2026 (EU) June 2026 (Canada) November 2026 (Australia)	
	Coco's Farm	United KingdomCanada	Asset freeze (UK), Financial prohibitions (Canada)	Serious abuse of the right of individuals not to be subjected to cruel, inhuman or degrading treatment or punishment	May 2025 June 2026 (Canada)	
	Neria's Farm	United KingdomAustralia	Asset freeze (UK), targeted financial sanction (Australia)	Serious abuse of the right of individuals not to be subjected to cruel, inhuman or degrading treatment or punishment (UK) Founded by Neria Ben Pazi (Australia)	May 2025 (UK) June 2026 (Australia)	
	Libi Construction and Infrastructure	United KingdomCanadaAustralia	Asset freeze and Director Disqualification Sanction (UK), financial prohibitions (Canada)	Establishment of illegal outposts resulting in the forced displacement of Palestinians (UK)	May 2025 June 2026 (Canada) November 2026 (Australia)	
	Tirzah Valley Farm Outpost (Moshe's Farm)	CanadaUnited Kingdom; AustraliaEuropean Union	Asset freezes, (Canada, UK) financial prohibitions (Canada), Director Disqualification Sanction (UK)	participating in or facilitating acts of harassment and violence	June 2024 (Canada) 15 July 2024 (EU) October 2024 (United Kingdom) June 2026 (Australia)	
	Zvi's Farm	CanadaAustraliaEuropean Union	Asset freezes and financial prohibitions (Canada), targeteted financial sanction (Australia)	participating in or facilitating acts of harassment and violence	June 2024 15 July 2024 (EU) June 2026 (Australia)	
	Micha's Farm	Canada	Financial prohibitions		June 2026 (Canada)	
	Torat Lechima	United Kingdom	Asset freeze, Director Disqualification Sanction	supported, incited and promoted violence against Palestinian communities	October 2024	
	Meitarim Outpost	United KingdomAustralia	Asset freeze and Director Disqualification Sanction (UK), targeted financial sanction (Australia)	supported, incited and promoted violence against Palestinian communities	October 2024 (UK) June 2026 (Australia)	
	Shuvi Eretz Outpost	United Kingdom	Asset freeze, Director Disqualification Sanction	supported, incited and promoted violence against Palestinian communities	October 2024	
	Regavim	European UnionCanada	Asset freeze (EU), financial prohibitions (EU, Canada)	lobbying for and instituting legal proceedings to demolish Palestinian property, including demolition of an EU-funded Palestinian primary school. (EU)	May 2026 (EU) June 2026 (Canada)	
	The Farms Association	United Kingdom	Asset freezes and Director Disqualification Sanctions. (UK)	"provid[ing] financial and organisational support to Israeli settler farms and outposts in the West Bank, including those associated with violence, intimidation and forced displacement of Palestinians"	June 2026 (UK)	
	Ahavat Gilad	United Kingdom	Asset freezes and Director Disqualification Sanctions. (UK)	Acting as a "financial conduit" for the Farms Association	June 2026 (UK)	
	Ari Yshag	United Kingdom	Asset freezes and Director Disqualification Sanctions. (UK)	Fundraising "for illegal settler outposts associated with violence, intimidation and forced displacement of Palestinians"	June 2026 (UK)	
	Artzenu	United Kingdom	Asset freezes and Director Disqualification Sanctions. (UK)	"Promot[ing], financ[ing] and resources settler farms and outposts associated with violence against Palestinians, including fundraising for tactical military equipment for armed settler squads"	June 2026 (UK)	
	Shivat Zion Lerigvey Admata	United Kingdom	Asset freezes and Director Disqualification Sanctions. (UK)	acts as "the registered legal vehicle through which Artzenu's financial activities are conducted, channelling donations to outposts linked to serious human rights abuses"	June 2026 (UK)	
	Eyal Hari Yehuda	United KingdomAustralia	Asset freezes and Director Disqualification Sanctions. (UK)	Facilitating, supporting, being responsible for its "owners, staff, associates and family members who have used company resources" to "destroy Palestinian land and property" and attacking, shooting and killing Palestinians, "which has led to the wider displacement of Palestinians"	June 2026 (UK), November 2026 (Australia)	
	Har hevron development company	United Kingdom	Asset freeze, Director Disqualification Sanction	Involved in facilitating or providing support for activity which constitutes a serious violation of international humanitarian law; Specifically, carrying out construction and infrastructure works for, and supplying housing units to, Israeli settlements and outposts in the southern West Bank.	17 November 2026	
	Hemdat Shomron	United Kingdom	Asset freeze, Director Disqualification Sanction	Facilitating or providing support for and profiting from, activity which constitutes a serious violation of international humanitarian law; Initiating, planning, building and marketing housing in Israeli settlements in the occupied West Bank, including at Einav, Kfar Tapuach, Pedu'el, Ma'ale Efrayim, Mitzpe Yericho and Dolev.	17 November 2026	
	S.A.G. (Velvel) construction and development	United Kingdom	Asset freeze, Director Disqualification Sanction	Involved in facilitating or providing support for, as well as profiting from, activity which constitutes a serious violation of international humanitarian law. Building and marketing housing and public buildings in Israeli settlements in the occupied West Bank, including at Erfat, Shilo and Eli.	17 November 2026	
	Lev HaHar Yazamut	United Kingdom	Asset freeze, Director Disqualification Sanction	Involved in facilitating or providing support for, as well as profiting from, activity which constitutes a serious violation of international humanitarian law. Specifically, building and marketing housing in Israeli settlements in the occupied West Bank Itamar, Elon Moreh, Bruchin, Rechelim, and Neria.	17 November 2026	
	Harey Zahav	United Kingdom	Asset freeze, Director Disqualification Sanction	Facilitating or providing support for, as well as profiting financially or obtaining other benefit from, activity which constitutes a serious violation of international humanitarian law. Specifically, initiating, planning, building and marketing housing in Israeli settlements in the occupied West Bank to purchasers in Israel and abroad.	17 November 2026	
	Ariel Residential Judea & Samaria	United Kingdom	Asset freeze, Director Disqualification Sanction	Involved in facilitating or providing support for, as well as profiting from, activity which constitutes a serious violation of international humanitarian law; Specifically, initiating, planning, building and marketing housing in Israeli settlements in the occupied West Bank, including at Ariel, Alei Zahav, Pedu'el, Metzad, and Efrat.	17 November 2026	
	Ami Gvirtzman Architects 2021	United Kingdom	Asset freeze, Director Disqualification Sanction	Involvement in facilitating or providing support for and profiting from, activity which constitutes a serious violation of international humanitarian law; Specifically, designing housing, neighbourhoods and public infrastructure for Israeli settlements in the occupied West Bank, including at Carmel, Ma'ale Amos, Tekoa and Efrat.	17 November 2026	
	Z.F. Building Company	United Kingdom	Asset freeze, Director Disqualification Sanction	Z.F. BUILDING is or has been involved in facilitating or providing support for, as well as profiting from, activity which constitutes a serious violation of international humanitarian law; Specifically, initiating, planning, building and marketing housing in Israeli settlements in the occupied West Bank, including at Ma'ale Yisrael, Nokdim and Kiryat Netafim.	17 November 2026	

== See also ==
- Arms embargoes on Israel since 2023
- Boycotts of Israel
- Boycott, Divestment and Sanctions
  - American Studies Association's boycott of Israel
  - Anti-BDS laws
- List of sanctions involving Australia
- Kahanism
