= Politics of Australia =

In Australia, politics operates under the written Australian Constitution, which sets out Australia as a constitutional monarchy, governed via a parliamentary democracy in the Westminster tradition. Australia is also a federation, where power is divided between the federal government and the states. The monarch, currently King Charles III, is the head of state and is represented locally by the governor-general, while the head of government is the prime minister, currently Anthony Albanese.

The country has maintained a stable liberal democratic political system under its Constitution, the world's tenth oldest, since Federation in 1901. Australia largely operates as a two-party system in which voting is compulsory. The Economist Intelligence Unit rated Australia a "full democracy" in 2023.

Like other Westminster-style systems of government, Australia's federal system of government consists of three branches: the legislative (Parliament), the executive (the prime minister, the cabinet, other ministers, and government departments), and the judicature (the High Court of Australia and other federal courts). The Australian government consists of the party or coalition that had majority support in the lower house and exercises both executive (as ministers) and legislative (through control of the House) power.

Diagram of the roles of Australian political institutions

The federal Parliament (as defined in section 1 of the Constitution) comprises the monarch and is bicameral (has two chambers): the House of Representatives (lower house) and Senate (upper house). The House of Representatives has 150 members, each representing an individual electoral district of about 165,000 people. The Senate has 76 members: twelve from each of the six states and two each from Australia's internal territories, the Australian Capital Territory and Northern Territory.

Separation of powers is the principle the power of state should be shared between multiple bodies, in order to avoid the concentration of power in one entity. The legislature proposes and debates laws that the executive then administers, and the judicial arbitrates cases arising from the administration of laws and common law. However, in accordance with Westminster system, there is no strict separation between the executive and legislative branches, with ministers required to also be members of the legislature. Only a court can deem if a law is constitutional or not.

The Australian system of government combines elements derived from the political systems of the United Kingdom (fused executive, constitutional monarchy) and the United States (federalism, written constitution, strong bicameralism), along with distinctive local features, and has therefore been characterised as a "Washminster mutation".

The three branches of Australia's system of government

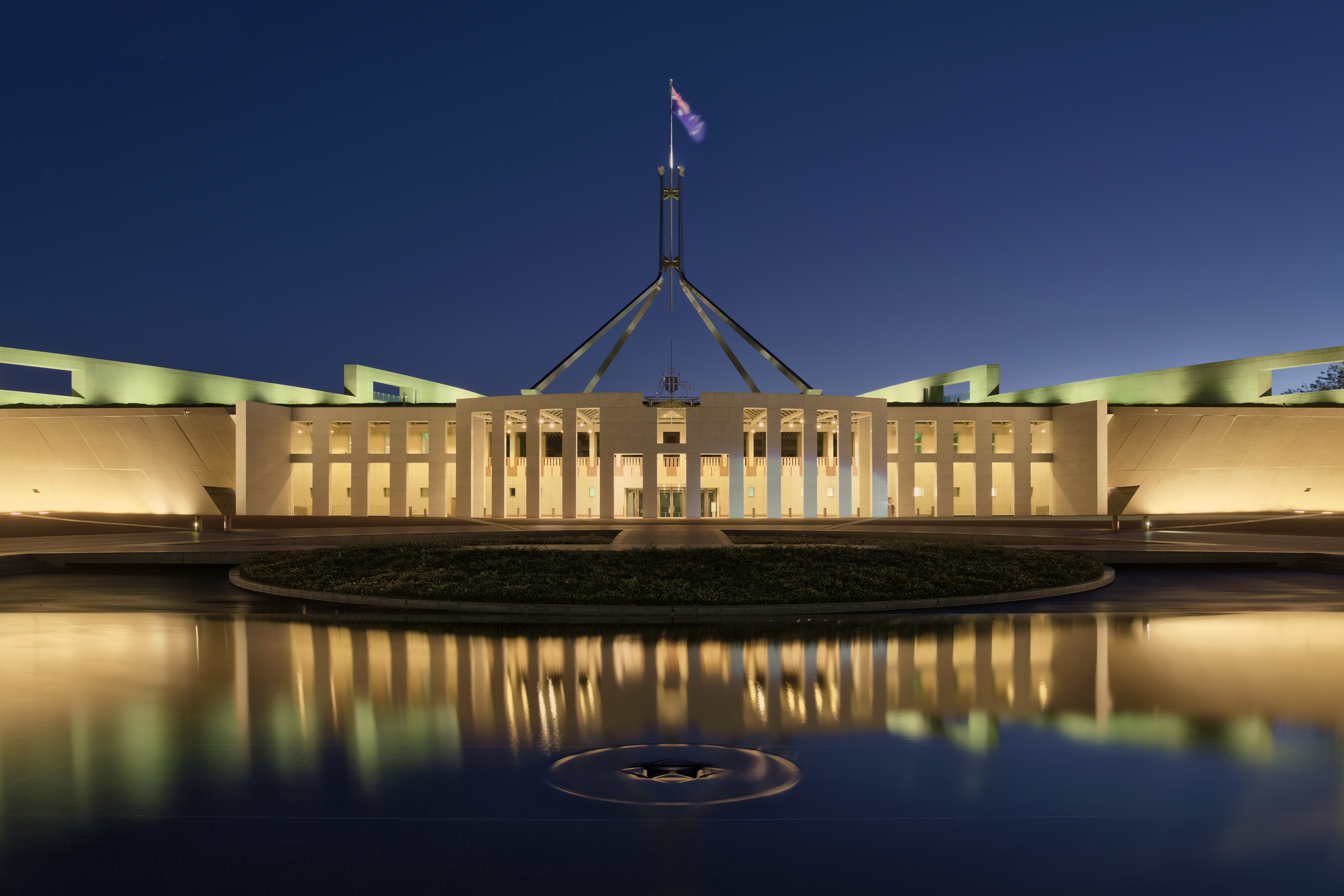
The legislature: Parliament House in Canberra, the seat of the Parliament of Australia

The executive: The Head of State and King of Australia, Charles III, who appoints the governor-general on the advice of the prime minister

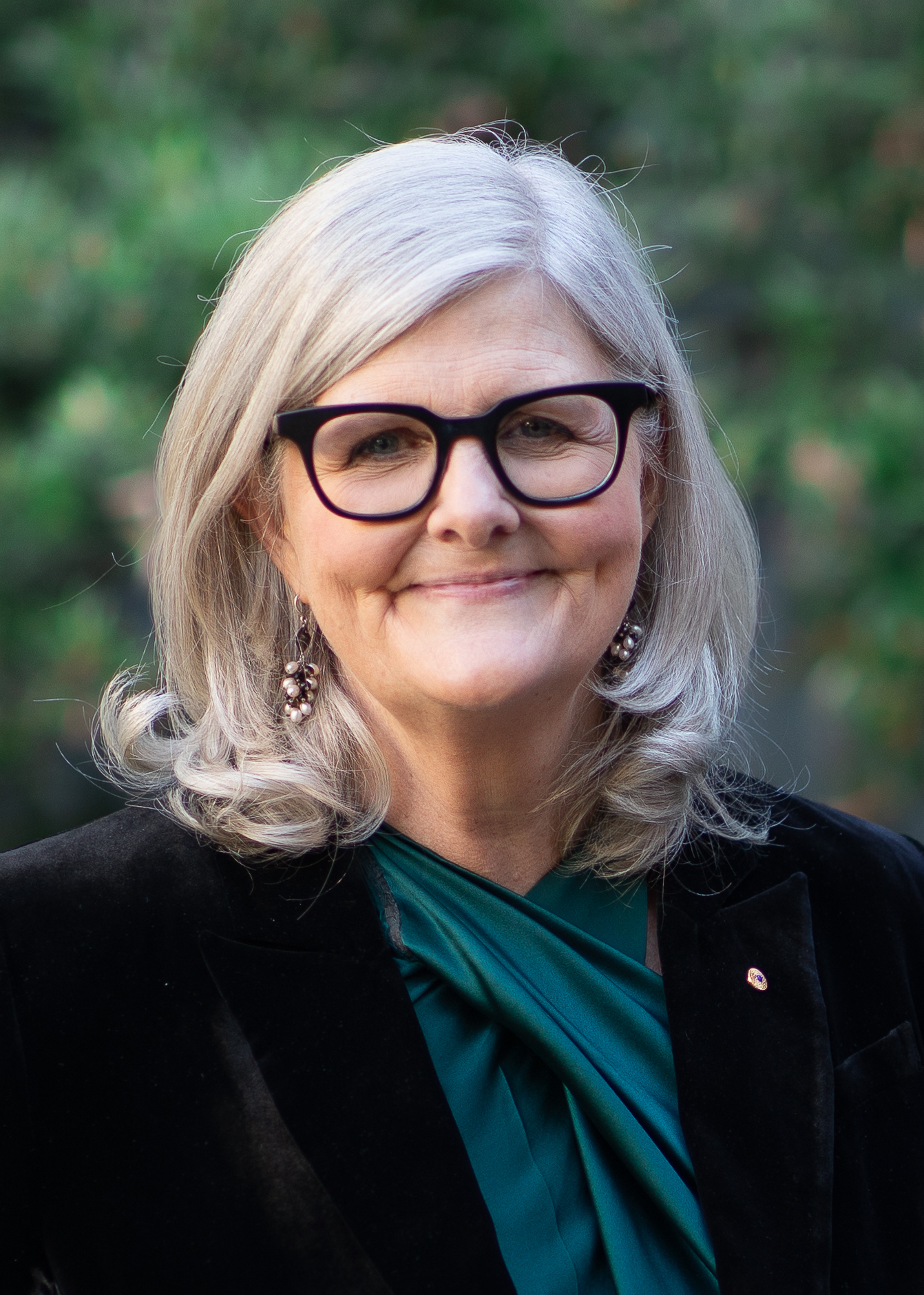
The executive: The Governor-General, Samantha Mostyn, who by Section 63 of the Constitution follows the Executive Council's advice

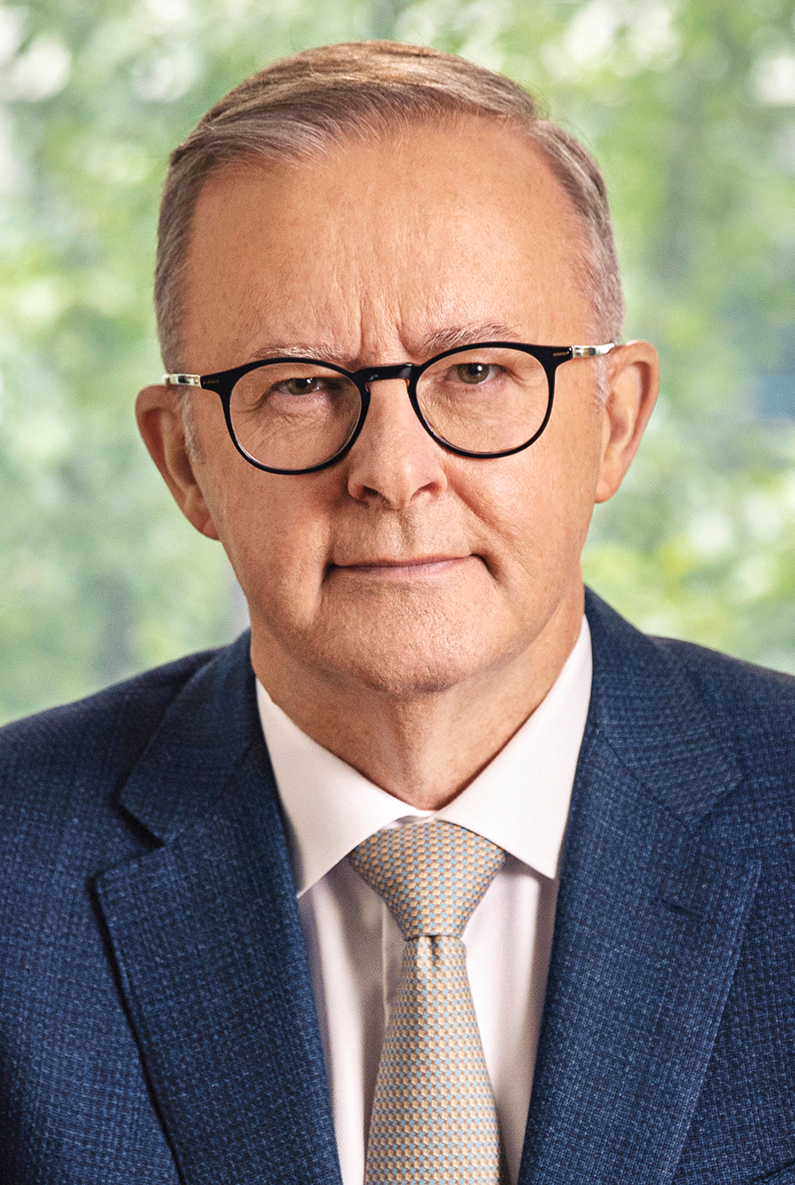
The executive: The Prime Minister, Anthony Albanese, head of Cabinet which acts through the Federal Executive Council

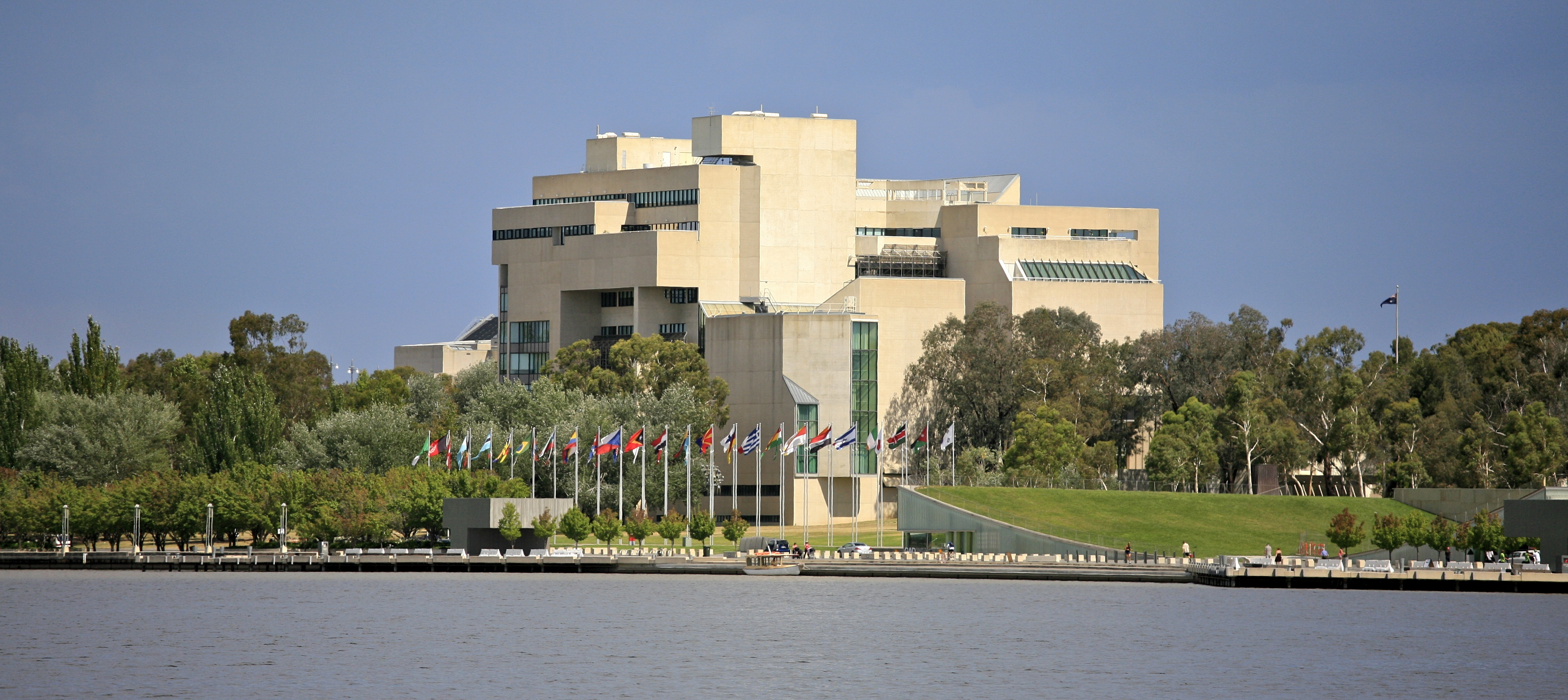
The judiciary: the High Court of Australia, the nation's highest court

== Federal nature ==
Australia is a federation, with different powers and responsibilities for the three levels of government: the federal government, the states and territories and local government.

The federal nature and the structure of the Parliament of Australia were the subject of protracted negotiations among the colonies during the drafting of the Constitution. The House of Representatives is elected on a basis that reflects the differing populations of the states. Therefore, the most populous state, New South Wales, has 48 members, while the least populated, Tasmania, has only five. This is in contrast to the Senate which is elected on a basis of equality among the states: all states elect 12 senators, regardless of population. This was intended to ensure that smaller states retained influence over legislation and that laws could not be passed with only the support of the more populous states. The Australian Capital Territory and the Northern Territory, the only territories represented in Senate, each elect only two.

The federal government may only legislate on certain matters, with any remaining areas falling within the responsibility of the states. For example, the federal government is responsible for defence, inter-state trade and bankruptcy while the states are responsible for hospitals and schools. Additionally, the states can agree to refer any of their powers to the Commonwealth government via legislation, as has been done to allow the Commonwealth to regulate corporations. The federal government can also significantly influence state legislation by making tied grants (money which comes with certain conditions). This is a significant power due to high levels of vertical fiscal imbalance arising because of the limited revenue raising capabilities of the states.

In addition, Australia has several territories, two of which are self-governing: the Australian Capital Territory and the Northern Territory. As these territories' legislatures exercise powers devolved to them by the Commonwealth, the Parliament of Australia has the authority to override their legislation and to alter their powers. Australian citizens in these territories are represented by members of both houses of the Parliament of Australia, albeit with less representation in the Senate. Norfolk Island was self-governing from 1979 until 2015, although it was never represented as such in the Parliament of Australia. The other inhabited territories: Jervis Bay, Christmas Island and the Cocos (Keeling) Islands, have never been self-governing.

The third level of governance is local government, in the form of shires, towns or cities. The councils of these areas are composed of elected representatives (known as either councillor or alderman, depending on the state). Their powers are devolved to them by the state or territory in which they are located.

== Constitution ==
The Australian Constitution sets down the powers and responsibilities of many of the institutions of the Australian Commonwealth. However, the prime minister, the cabinet and the other principles of responsible government are not explicitly mentioned in the document, along with most of the realities of exercise of executive power. This reflected the British influence on the document with its unwritten constitution.

The Parliament of Australia can propose changes to the Constitution. To become effective, the proposals must be put to a referendum of all Australians of voting age and must receive a double majority: a majority of all votes, and a majority of votes in a majority of states.

Section 1 of the Australian Constitution creates a democratic legislature, the bicameral Parliament of Australia which consists of the monarch and two chambers of parliament, the Senate and the House of Representatives. Section 51 of the Constitution provides for the Australian government's legislative powers and allocates certain powers (known as heads of power) to the federal government. All remaining legislative power is retained by the six states (previously separate colonies). Further, each state has its own constitution, so that Australia has seven parliaments, with legislative power shared between them. The High Court of Australia rules on legal disputes which arise between the federal government and the states and territories, or among the states and territories themselves.

== The Crown ==
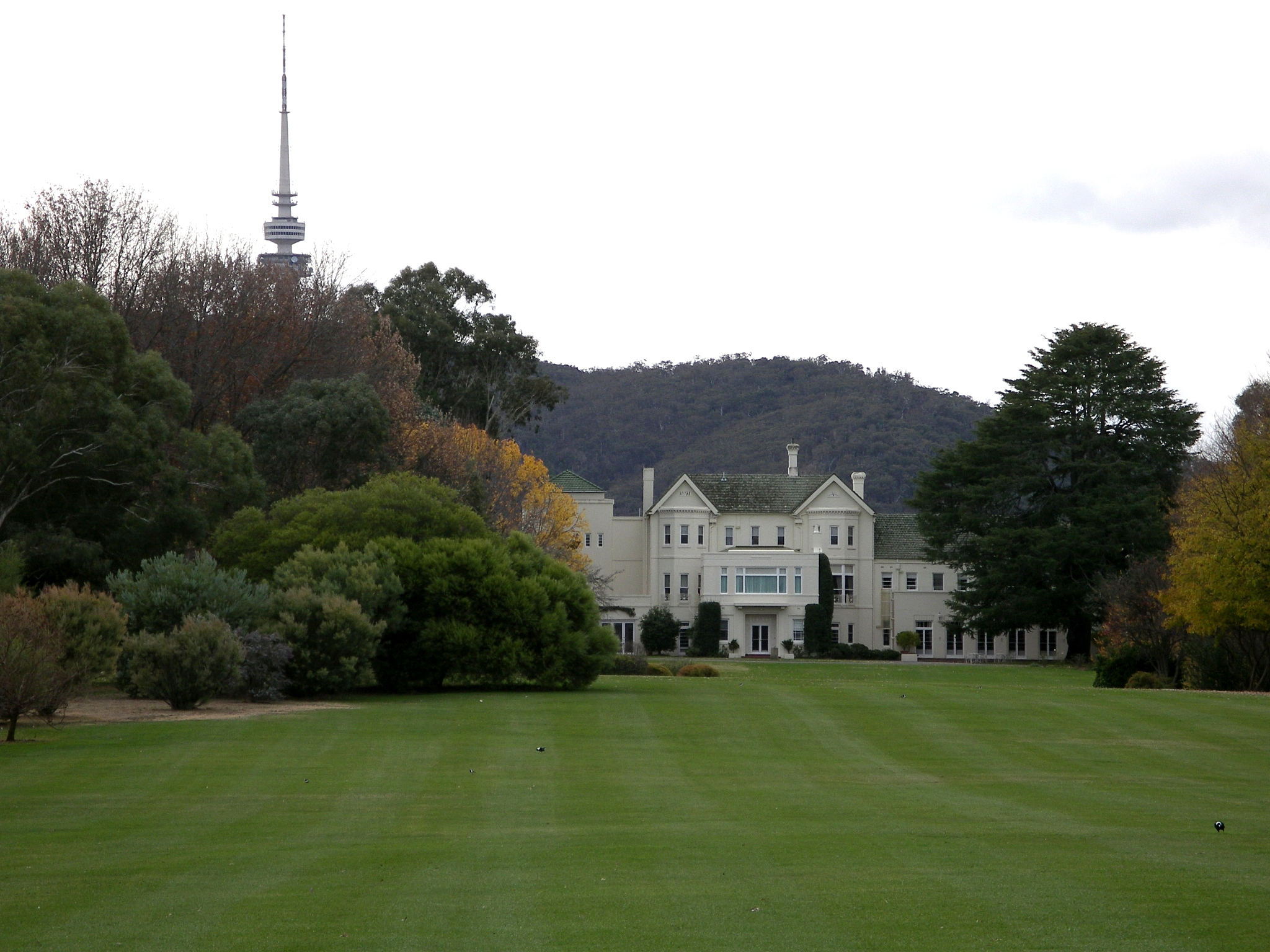
Government House, Canberra

The monarch is the symbolic head of Australia and is ceremonially involved in all branches of the government, as a constitutive part of Parliament, formal holder of executive power and the person in whose name most criminal offences are brought. In a broader sense, the Crown represents the authority of the polity itself. However, in all these functions they are represented by the governor-general, whose appointment is the only mandatory function of the monarch. The monarch of Australia, currently Charles III, is also the monarch of the other Commonwealth realms, and the sovereign of the United Kingdom. The monarch is the head of state, however in almost all matters the governor-general performs the functions of the head of state, leading some commentators to contend that the governor-general is the head of state. As a constitutional democracy, the role is limited to constitutional and ceremonial duties. The governor-general also represents Australia internationally, through making and receiving state visits.

Since at least the passage and adoption of the Statute of Westminster, the monarch of Australia (along with the monarchies of the other dominions) is a separate office from the monarch of the United Kingdom, despite being held by the same person. As such, in Commonwealth matters, the monarch is only advised by Commonwealth ministers. By the Royal Style and Titles Act 1953, the Australian Parliament gave the Queen the title Queen of Australia, and in 1973 titles with any reference to her status as Queen of the United Kingdom and Defender of the Faith as well were removed.

Under the conventions of the Westminster system the governor-general's powers are almost always exercised on the advice of the prime minister or other ministers. However, the governor-general retains some reserve powers, being powers not subject to the approval of another person or institution. These are rarely exercised, but during the Australian constitutional crisis of 1975 Governor-general Sir John Kerr used them to dismiss the prime minister during a parliamentary deadlock over supply.

Australia has periodically experienced movements seeking to end the monarchy. In a 1999 referendum, the Australian people voted on a proposal to change the Constitution. The proposal would have removed references to the Queen from the Constitution and replaced the governor-general with a president nominated by the prime minister, but subject to the approval of a two-thirds majority of both houses of Parliament. The proposal was defeated. The Australian Republican Movement continues to campaign for an end to the monarchy in Australia, opposed by Australians for Constitutional Monarchy and Australian Monarchist League.

== The Parliament ==
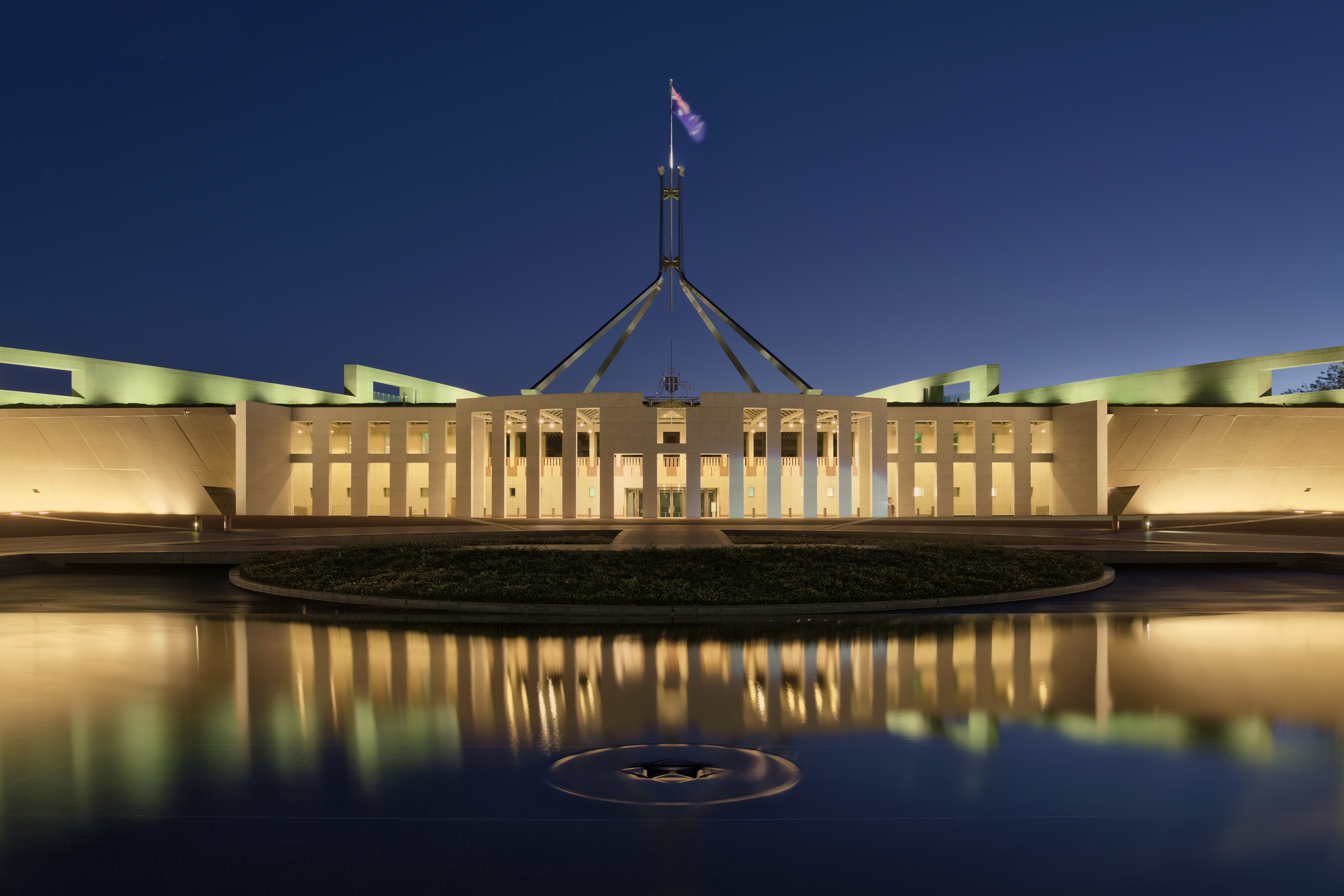
Parliament House, Canberra.

The Parliament exercises the legislative power of the Commonwealth by enacting legislation. It also supervises the executive actions of the government, through activities such as question time and Senate estimates. The Australian Parliament is bicameral and consists of the King of Australia, the 76 member Senate (the upper house) and the 151 member House of Representatives (the lower house). The Australian government is responsible to the Parliament, of which they must be (or shortly become) members. In the Senate, 12 senators are from each State and 2 senators from the ACT and the NT respectively are elected by an optional preferential single transferable vote system. State senators serve staggered fixed six year terms, with half up for election each three years. Territory senators serve a non fixed term equal to that of the House of Representatives, usually around three years. The most recent general election was on 3 May, 2025.

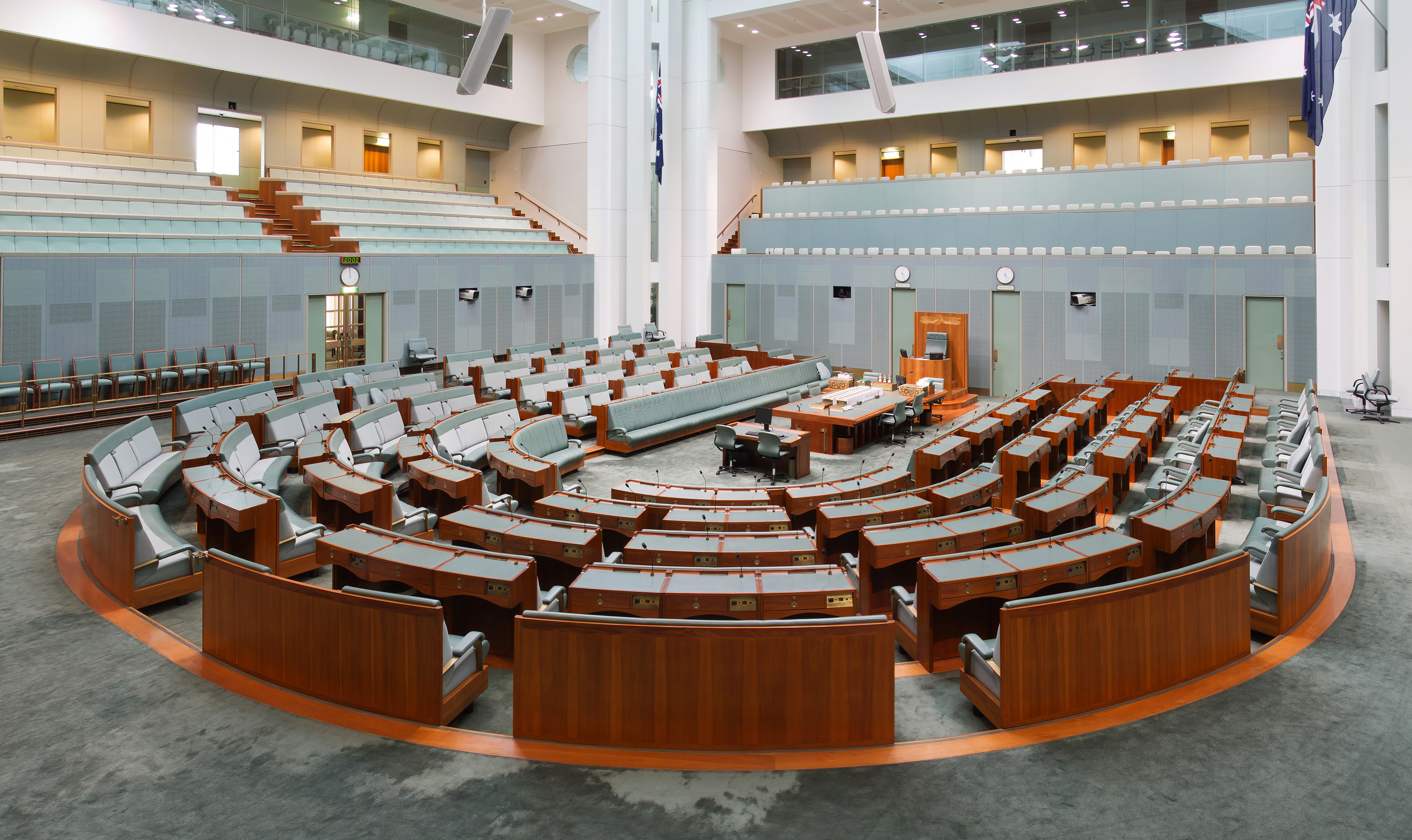
The Australian House of Representatives chamber

In the House of Representatives, also known as the people's house, 151 members are elected using full preferential voting in single member electorates (also known as seats). Elections are held once at least every three years, however the prime minister (historically the Cabinet) may request the governor-general call a new election at any time. The governor-general retains the discretion to refuse if inadequate reasons for the election are given. As Senate elections must occur only during certain periods and as it is generally politically advantageous (while not legally required) to hold House elections at the same time, elections are generally restricted to a ten month window between August and May every three years, with the last split election in 1970 and 1972. Unlike in the Senate, in which each state is represented equally, each state has a number of seats roughly proportional to its population. The prime minister is selected from the House, needing the support of the majority of members in order to be invited to form a government.

Each chamber of Parliament has equal powers, with the exception that the Senate may not introduce "money bills" (new taxes or laws authorising expenditure). However, the Senate can still block supply (the annual bill authorising government expenditure), but this has only happened once, during the 1975 Australian constitutional crisis.

Parliamentarians belong to either the government, the opposition or sit on the cross-bench (which includes independents and members of minor parties). The opposition consists of members of the second largest party or coalition in the House of Representatives. The Leader of the Opposition heads shadow cabinet, composed of shadow ministers who mirror, scrutinise and oppose government ministers and act as the government in waiting. Although the government, by virtue of commanding a majority of members in the lower house of the Parliament, can usually pass its legislation and control the workings of the House, the opposition can considerably delay the passage of legislation and obstruct government business if it chooses. The day-to-day business of the House of Representatives is usually negotiated between the Leader of the House, appointed by the prime minister, and the Manager of Opposition Business in the House, appointed by the Leader of the Opposition.

== The Executive Government ==
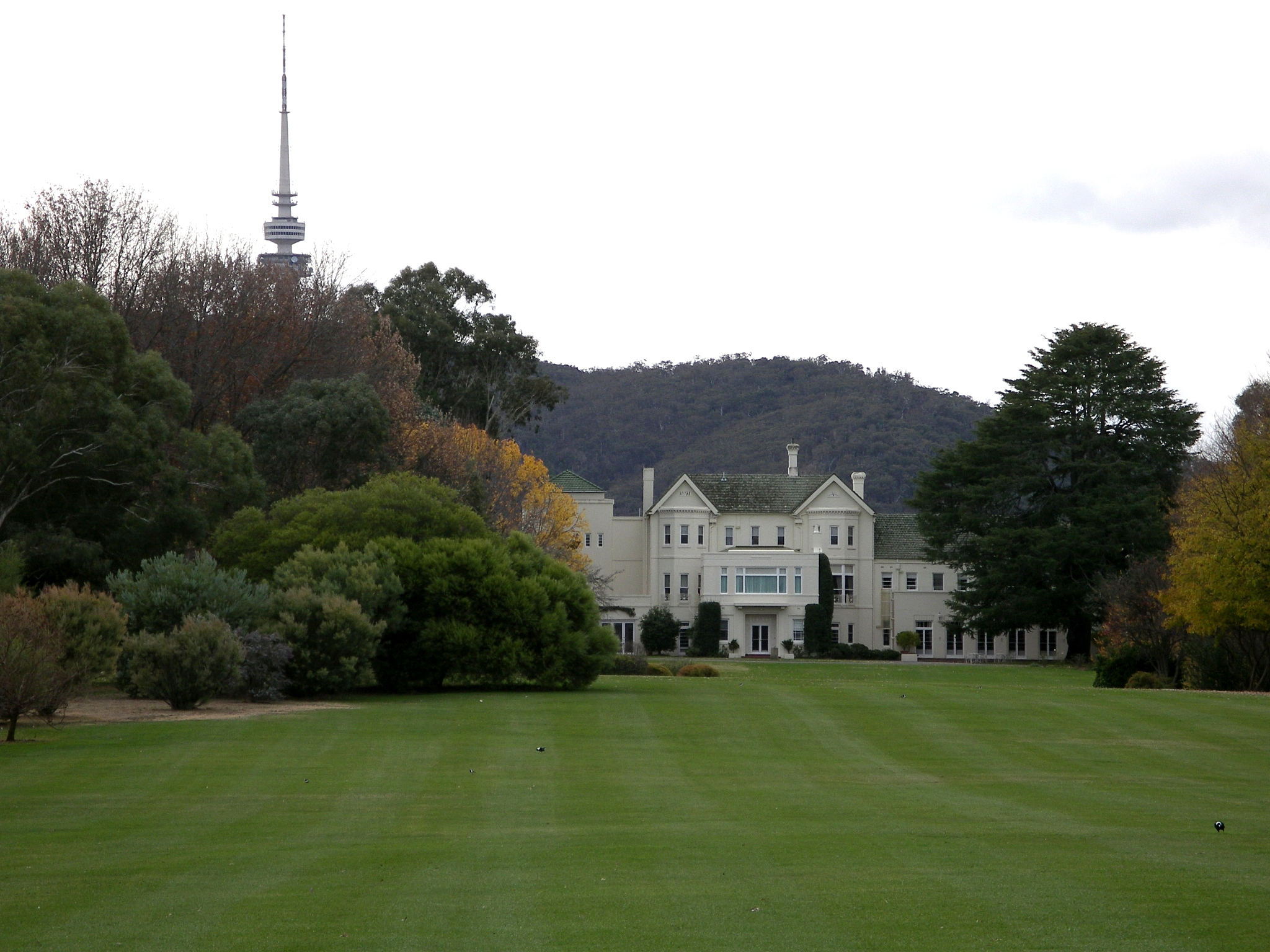
Government House, Canberra, also known as "Yarralumla", is the official residence of the Governor-General.

The executive's primary role is to implement the laws passed by the Parliament. Unlike the other two branches of government however, membership of the executive is not clearly defined. One definition describes the executive as a pyramid, consisting of three layers. At the top stands the King, as the symbolic apex and formal repository of executive power. Below him lies a second layer made up of the prime-minister, cabinet and other ministers who in practice lead the executive. Finally, the bottom layer includes public servants, police, government departments and independent statutory bodies who directly implement policy and laws.

Executive power is also difficult to clearly define. In the British context, it was defined by John Locke as all government power not legislative or judicial in nature. The key distinction is that while legislative power involves setting down rules of general application, executive power involves applying those rules to specific situations. In practice however, this definition is difficult to apply as many actions by executive agencies are wide ranging, binding and conducted independently of Parliament. Ultimately whether a power is executive or legislative is determined on a case by case basis, and involves the weighing up of various factors, rather than the application of a strict test.

=== Executive council ===
The Federal Executive Council is a formal body which exists and meets to give legal effect to decisions made by the Cabinet, and to carry out various other functions. All ministers are members of the council and are entitled to be styled The Honourable for life. The governor-general usually presides at council meetings, but in his or her absence another minister nominated as the Vice-President of the Executive Council presides at the meeting of the council. Since 1 June 2022, the vice-president of the Federal Executive Council has been Senator Katy Gallagher.

=== Cabinet ===
The Cabinet of Australia is the council of senior ministers, responsible to the Parliament. The ministers are appointed by the governor-general, on the advice of the prime minister, who serve at the former's pleasure. Cabinet meetings are strictly private and occur once a week where vital issues are discussed and policy formulated. Outside the cabinet there is an outer ministry and also a number of junior ministers, called assistant ministers (formally parliamentary secretaries), responsible for a specific policy area and reporting directly to a senior Cabinet minister.

The Constitution of Australia does not explicitly mention Cabinet; it existing solely by convention, with its decisions not in and of themselves having legal force. However, it serves as the practical expression of the Federal Executive Council, which is Australia's highest formal executive governmental body. In practice, the Federal Executive Council meets solely to endorse and give legal force to decisions already made by the Cabinet. All members of the Cabinet are members of the Executive Council. While the governor-general is nominal presiding officer, they almost never attend Executive Council meetings. A senior member of the Cabinet holds the office of vice-president of the Executive Council and acts as presiding officer of the Executive Council in the absence of the governor-general.

Until 1956 all members of the ministry were members of the Cabinet. The growth of the ministry in the 1940s and 1950s made this increasingly impractical, and in 1956 Robert Menzies created a two-tier ministry, with only senior ministers holding Cabinet rank, also known within parliament as the front bench. This practice has been continued by all governments except the Whitlam government.

When the non-Labor parties are in power, the prime minister makes all Cabinet and ministerial appointments at their own discretion, although in practice they consult with senior colleagues in making appointments. When the Liberal Party and its predecessors (the Nationalist Party and the United Australia Party) have been in coalition with the National Party or its predecessor the Country Party, the leader of the junior Coalition party has had the right to nominate their party's members of the Coalition ministry, and to be consulted by the prime minister on the allocation of their portfolios.

When Labor first held office under Chris Watson, Watson assumed the right to choose members of his Cabinet. In 1907, however, the party decided that future Labor Cabinets would be elected by the members of the parliamentary Labor Party, (the Caucus) and the prime minister would retain the right to allocate portfolios. This practice was followed until 2007. Between 1907 and 2007, Labor prime ministers exercised a predominant influence over who was elected to Labor ministries, although the leaders of the party factions also exercised considerable influence. Prior to the 2007 general election, the then Leader of the Opposition, Kevin Rudd, said that he and he alone would choose the ministry should he become prime minister. His party won the election and he chose the ministry, as he said he would. However, in return for changes restricting the ability of Caucus to select the prime minister, in 2013 the right of Caucus to choose the ministry was restored. While Caucus rules are not public, the Sydney Morning Herald has reported that ministerial positions are allocated to the Left and Right factions on a proportional basis according to their representation in Parliament. The Left selects their ministers nationally, whilst the Right assigns ministers according to state based quotas.

The cabinet meets not only in Canberra but also in state capitals, most frequently Sydney and Melbourne. Kevin Rudd was in favour of the Cabinet meeting in other places, such as major regional cities. There are Commonwealth Parliament Offices in each state capital, with those in Sydney located in 1 Bligh Street.

== The Judicature ==
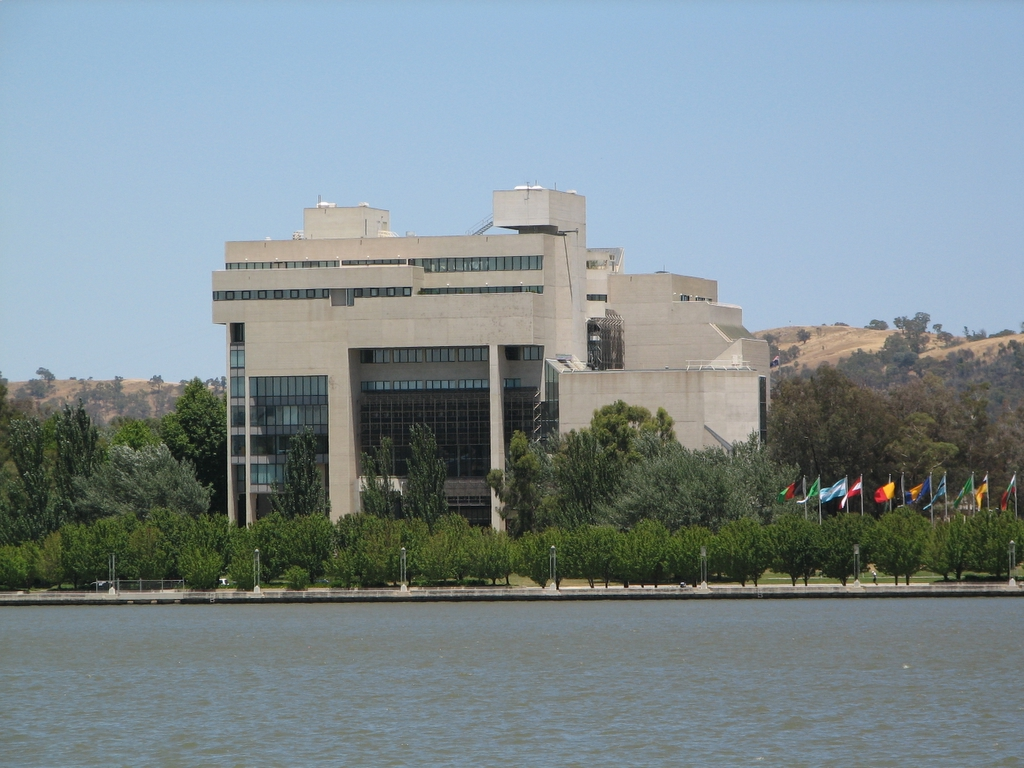
High Court building, view from Lake Burley Griffin

As a federation, in Australia judicial power is exercised by both federal and state courts. However, unlike the UK's multiple legal systems there is only one legal system and like Canada and unlike the US there is only one common law of the nation, rather than a common law for each state. Additionally, unlike Canada and the US, there is no distinct federal common law.

Federal judicial power is vested in the High Court of Australia and such other federal courts created by the Parliament, including the Federal Court of Australia, the Family Court of Australia, and the Federal Circuit Court of Australia. Additionally, the Parliament has the power to enact laws which vest federal authority in state courts. Since the Constitution requires a separation of powers at the federal level, only courts may exercise federal judicial power; and conversely, non-judicial functions cannot be vested in courts.

State judicial power is exercised by each state's supreme court, and such other courts and tribunals created by the state parliaments.

The High Court of Australia is the supreme court in the Australian court hierarchy and the final court of appeal in Australia. It has both original and appellate jurisdiction, has the power of judicial review over laws passed by the Parliament of Australia and the parliaments of the states, and interprets the Constitution of Australia. The High Court is mandated by section 71 of the Constitution, which vests in it the judicial power of the Commonwealth of Australia. The High Court was constituted by the Judiciary Act 1903 (Cth). The High Court is composed of seven Justices: the Chief Justice of Australia, presently Stephen Gageler, and six other Justices.

The state supreme courts are also considered to be superior courts, those with unlimited jurisdiction to hear disputes and which are the pinnacle of the court hierarchy within their jurisdictions. They were created by means of the constitutions of their respective states or the self government Acts for the ACT and the Northern Territory. Appeals may be made from state supreme courts to the High Court of Australia.

Inferior courts are secondary to superior courts. Their existence stems from legislation and they only have the power to decide on matters which Parliament has granted them. Decisions in inferior courts can be appealed to the superior court in that area, and then to the High Court of Australia.

Until the passage of the Australia Act 1986, by the Australian and UK parliaments, some Australian cases could be referred to the British Judicial Committee of the Privy Council for final appeal. With this act, Australian law was made fully independent, and the High Court of Australia was confirmed as the highest court of appeal. The theoretical possibility of the British Parliament enacting laws to override the Australian Constitution was also removed.

== Elections ==
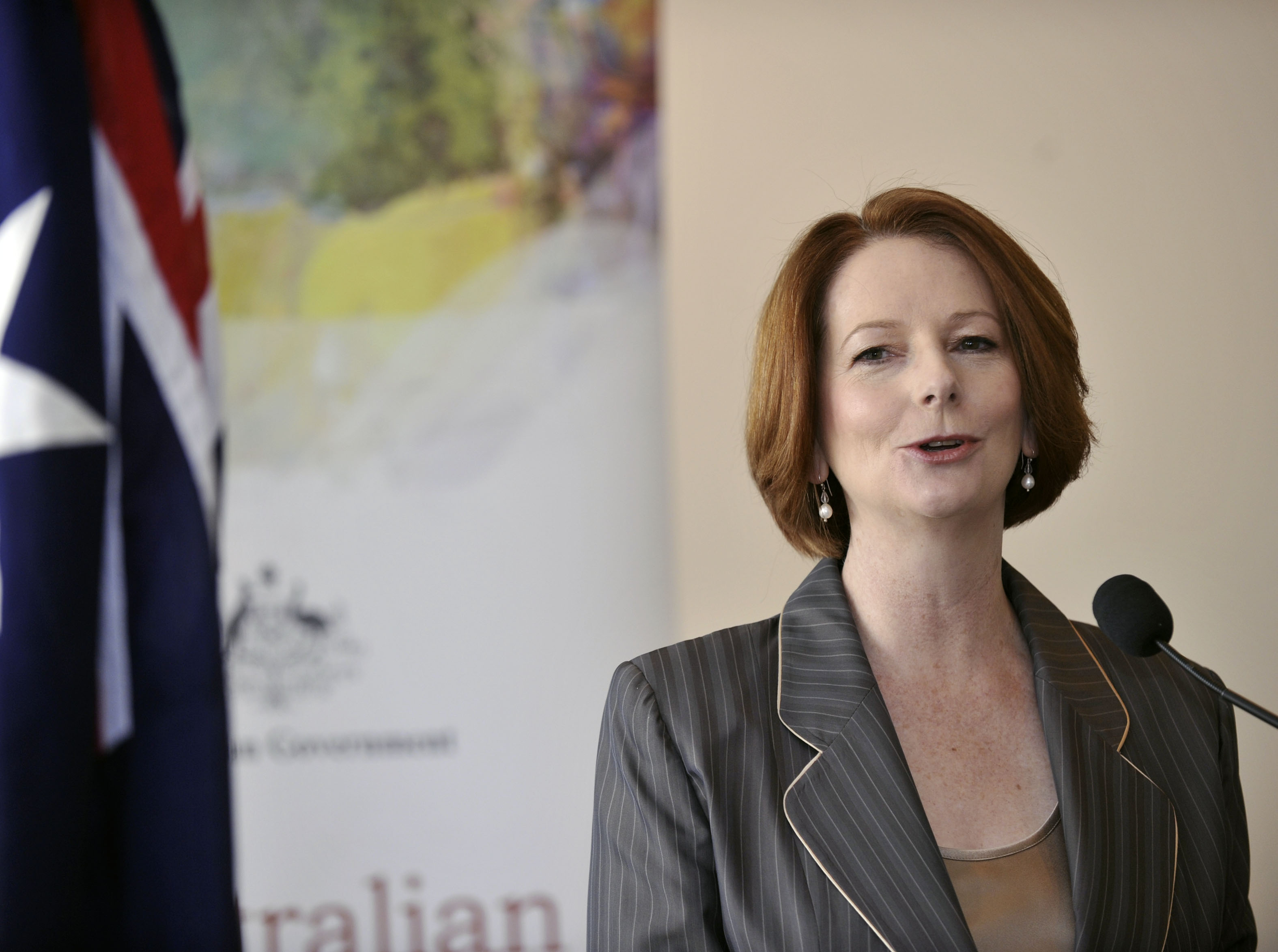
Julia Gillard, Prime Minister of Australia from 2010 to 2013 and the first female Prime Minister of the country.

Federal elections are held at least once every three years. (Note: The timing of elections is related to the dissolution or expiry of the House of Representatives, which extends for a maximum period of three years from the date of its first sitting, not the date of the election of its members. The house can be dissolved and a new election called at any time. In 12 out of 41 parliaments since Federation, more than three years have elapsed between elections. There is a complex formula for determining the date of such elections, which must satisfy section 32 of the Constitution of Australia and sections 156–8 of the Commonwealth Electoral Act 1918. These provisions do not allow an election to be held less than 33 days or more than 68 days after the dissolution of the House of Representatives. See 2010 Australian federal election for an example of how the formula applies in practice.) The prime minister can advise the governor-general to call an election for the House of Representatives at any time, but Senate elections can only be held within certain periods prescribed in the Australian Constitution. Although it is possible to hold elections for the House and Senate separately, it is the convention to hold simultaneous elections for both houses; every national election since 1974 has been for both the House and the Senate.

Voting has been compulsory federally since 1924, except for Indigenous Australians. All restrictions on Indigenous people's right to vote were removed in 1962, but this right remained optional until both voting and enrolment became compulsory in 1984. Federal enrolment for non-Indigenous Australians has been compulsory since 1911. Compulsory voting laws are actively enforced, with a failure to vote attracting a $20 fine. All non-Indigenous women gained the right to vote in federal elections in 1902 and in all states by 1908.

All seats in the House of Representatives are contested in each election. Members are elected using preferential voting, in which the winning candidate obtains over 50% of votes after distribution of preferences; therefore, preference flows from lower-polling candidates are frequently significant in electoral outcomes. Senate elections are contested by half the senators from each state, except in the case of a double dissolution where all senators contest the election; senators representing the territories are elected and sworn into office simultaneously with the House of Representatives rather than the rest of the Senate. All senators are elected using the single transferable voting system of proportional representation, which has resulted in a greater presence of minor parties in the Senate. With the exception of a three-year period from 2005 to 2008, no party or coalition has held a majority in the Senate since 1981; this has required governments to frequently seek the support of minor parties or independent senators holding the balance of power in order to secure their legislative agenda.

Because the Senate's system of single transferable voting requires a lower quota than the House in order to obtain a seat, minor parties have often focused their election efforts on the upper house. This is true also at state level (only the two territories and Queensland are unicameral). Historically it has been comparatively rarer for minor parties and independents to win seats in the House of Representatives, although the size of the crossbench has been on an increasing trend since the 1990 federal election The 2022 Australian federal election saw the election of a historically large crossbench in the House of Representatives consisting of six minor party members and ten independents.

== State and local government ==
Map showing the jurisdictions of Australia and their governing political parties as of July 2025. Labor Coalition

States and territories of Australia

Australia's six states and the two largest territories are structured within a political framework similar to that of the Commonwealth. Each state has its own bicameral parliament, with the exception of Queensland and the two territories, whose parliaments are unicameral. Each state has a governor, who undertakes a role equivalent to that of the governor-general at the federal level, and a premier, who is the head of government and is equivalent to the prime minister. Each state also has its own supreme court, from which appeals can be made to the High Court of Australia.

State and territory elections occur every four years using fixed terms (except for Tasmania, where the premier decides the date of the election).

Thomas Playford served as Premier of South Australia and leader of the Liberal and Country League (LCL) from 5 November 1938 to 10 March 1965 (26 years). it was the longest term of any elected government leader in Australian history.

Labor winning government in New South Wales on 25 March 2023 marked the second time in history that the Australian Labor Party gained control of the entirety of Mainland Australia at the federal and mainland state levels simultaneously (leaving Tasmania as the only state with a Liberal government), a feat that had last been achieved in 2007. This would last until 24 August 2024 when Labor lost government in the Northern Territory to the Country Liberal Party (CLP) opposition. The Liberal–National Coalition has never achieved this feat (control of the entirety of Mainland Australia at the federal and mainland state levels simultaneously) as of 2024.

Queensland is regarded as comparatively conservative. Victoria and the Australian Capital Territory are regarded as comparatively left of centre. New South Wales, the largest state by population, as well as South Australia have often been regarded as politically moderate bellwether states. Western Australia, by contrast, tends to be more politically volatile; regarded as the most conservative state during the 2000–10s, it has lately swung to rank amongst the most left-leaning states in the country. It is also known for historical secessionist sentiments.

Local government in Australia is the lowest tier of government. Local governments are subject to the relevant states and territories. There is only one level of local government in Australia; with none of the distinctive local government types seen in other anglophone nations. Most local governments within the states have equivalent powers to each other; styles such as shire or city have only historical meaning.

== Ideology in Australian politics ==
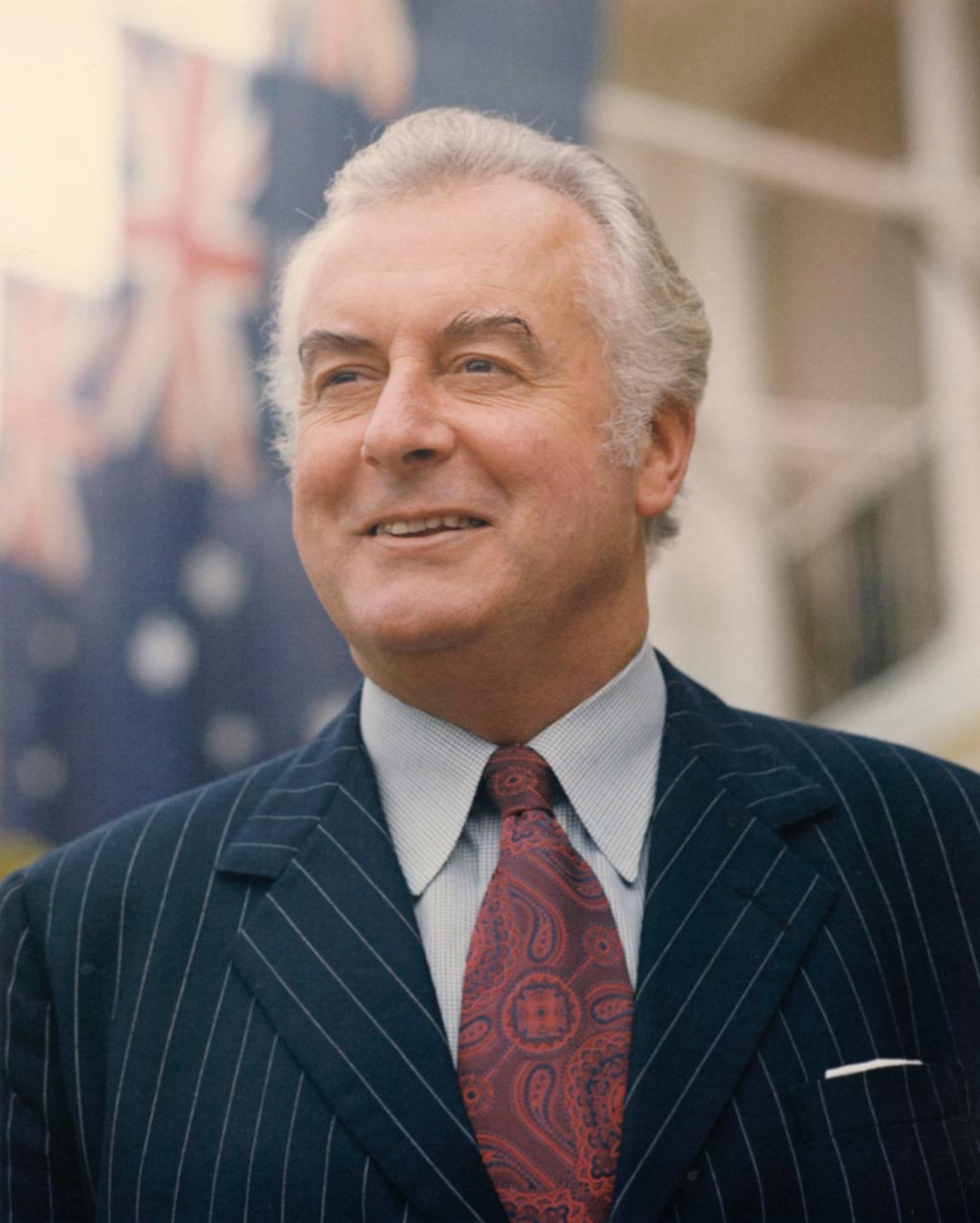
Gough Whitlam, the longest-serving parliamentary leader of the Australian Labor Party

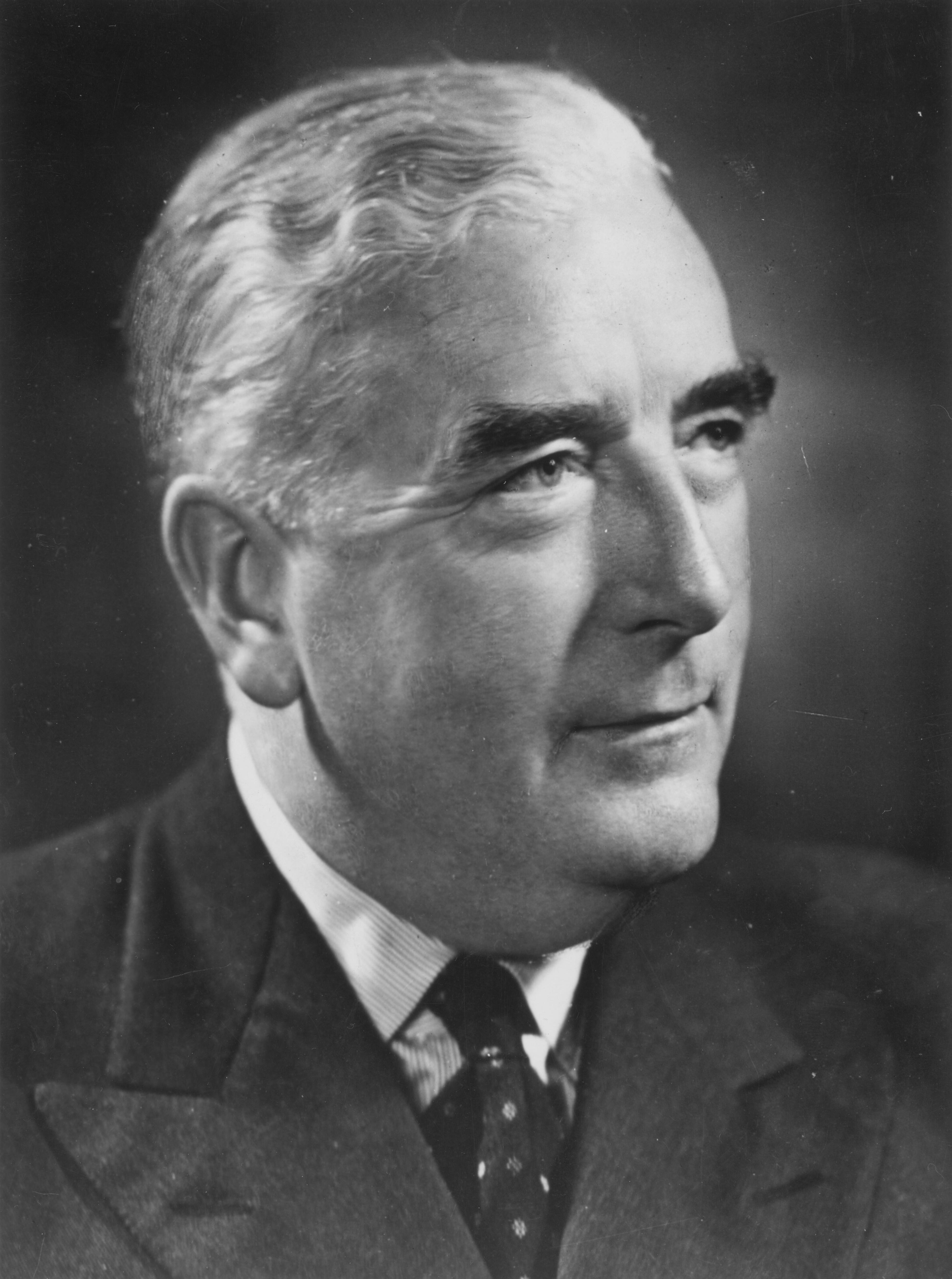
Sir Robert Menzies, founder of the Liberal Party of Australia, and Australia's longest-serving Prime Minister

The Australian party system has been described by political scientists as more ideologically driven than other similar anglophone countries such as the United States and Canada. In early Australian political history, class interests played a significant role in the division between the democratic socialist Australian Labor Party and a series of anti-Labor parties drawing on the liberal and conservative traditions (the predecessors of the modern Coalition of the Liberals and Nationals).

In contemporary Australian political culture, the Liberal and National parties are considered centre-right and the Australian Labor Party is considered centre-left. Australian conservatism is largely represented by the Liberal Party, along with Australian liberalism.

The Australian Labor Party defines itself as a "democratic socialist party" with the objective of the "democratic socialisation [of the economy] ... to the extent necessary to eliminate exploitation and other anti-social features". This objective is regarded by some within the modern party as an ideological anachronism, but supported by others critical of market based policies. In practice the party today reflects policy traditions of labourism (also characterised as neo-liberalism or Third Way policies, these principles being more prominent since the prime ministership of Gough Whitlam), democratic socialism and social democracy.

In recent decades there has been a marked shift amongst the Australian electorate in providing their first preference votes to candidates not belonging to either of the two major parties. At the 2022 federal election 31% gave their preference to a non-major party candidate.

== Political parties ==
Organised, national political parties have dominated Australia's political landscape since federation. The late 19th century saw the rise of the Australian Labor Party, which represented organised workers. Opposing interests coalesced into two main parties: a centre-right party with a base in business and the middle classes that has been predominantly conservative and moderate, now the Liberal Party of Australia; and a rural or agrarian conservative party, now the National Party of Australia.

Australian politics has mostly been a de facto two-party system, as a result of the long-standing coalition between the Liberal Party and National Party. The Greens are major 4th party with a high presence in the senate. Additionally there are also other groups like Teal Independents and other minor parties in Parliament. The coalition also exists at state level in all states except WA. The two parties are official merged as the LNP in Queensland and the separate CLP competes in the Northern Territory, which is affiliated with both coalition parties. Internal party discipline has historically been tight, unlike the situation in other countries such as the United States. Australia's political system has not always been a two-party system. In the early years of Federation, the emerging Australian Parliament was a "substantial arena" of various fragmented political parties, and it was not until 1909, as parliamentary politics became increasingly bipolar, that the merger occurred and the party system coalesced into the Labor Party and a non-Labor bloc.

The Australian Labor Party (ALP) is a social democratic party. It is a left leaning party with tendency towards social welfare and government assistance programs. It was founded by the Australian labour movement and broadly represents the urban working and middle classes.

The Liberal Party of Australia is a party of the centre-right which broadly represents businesses, the middle classes and many rural people. Its coalition partner at national level is the National Party of Australia, formerly known as the Country Party, a conservative party which represents rural interests. These two parties are collectively known as the federal Coalition. In Queensland, the two parties have officially merged to form the Liberal National Party, and in the Northern Territory, the Country Liberal Party has associate status with both the Liberals and the Nationals.

=== Minor/Third parties ===
While there are a small number of other minor political parties that have achieved parliamentary representation, the Labor Party and the Coalition dominate organised politics throughout Australia. Historically, they have positioned themselves as opponents or 'watchdogs' of the major parties, although since the 1980s, their political representation has been increasing: in the 1980 federal election, the combined primary votes of minor parties and independents accounted for just 8%; by 2025, this figure had risen to 34%, the highest ever recorded.

Minor parties in Australian politics include a green party, the Australian Greens (the largest of the minor parties since 2004); a centrist party, Centre Alliance; a nationalist party, Pauline Hanson's One Nation; and a right-wing agrarian party, Katter's Australian Party. Other significant parties in recent years have included the Clive Palmer led United Australia Party (not to be confused with the historical incarnation that was the predecessor to the Liberal party) and the socially conservative Family First Party, among others. Historically significant parties have included the United Australia Party, the Democratic Labor Party (1950s–1970s), the Communist Party of Australia, the socially liberal Australian Democrats (1970s–1990s) among others.

A notable election result for a third party other than Labor or the Liberal, Nationals, was in the 1998 Queensland state election, where One Nation with nearly 23% of the vote, gained the highest percentage of the vote than any other third party (i.e. not Labor, Coalition, or independents) at the state or territory level since Federation 1901. This was also the only election at which a third party gained more votes than both the Liberal Party and the National Party considered separately. This was One Nation's highest ever recorded election result in its history.

At the 2010 Tasmanian state election, the Greens secured 21.6% of the primary vote. This is the highest vote the Greens has ever recorded in any state or federal election as of 2024.

A collection of climate conscious and economically liberal independents commonly referred to as the teals were elected in the 2022 election, taking many seats previously held by moderate Liberal Party members.

== Timeline ==
Since federation, there have been 31 prime ministers of Australia. The longest-serving prime minister was Sir Robert Menzies of the Liberal Party, who served for 19 years from 1939 to 1941, and again from 1949 to 1966. The only other prime minister to serve for longer than a decade was John Howard, also of the Liberal Party, who led for more than 11 years from 1996 to 2007. The Coalition and its direct predecessors have governed at the federal level for a large majority of Australia's history since federation: 30,791 days as compared to Labor's 15,261 days.

=== Prime ministers' parties by time in office ===
- Liberal Party of Australia – 18513 days
- Australian Labor Party – 15261 days as of 18 November 2026
- Nationalist Party – 5142 days (Party Deregistered)
- United Australia Party – 3505 days (Party Deregistered)
- Protectionist Party – 2442 days (Party Deregistered)
- Commonwealth Liberal Party – 783 days (Party Deregistered)
- Free Trade Party – 322 days (Party Deregistered)
- Country Party – 84 days (Party Renamed)

== House of Representatives primary, two-party and seat results ==
A two-party system has existed in the Australian House of Representatives since the two non-Labor parties merged in 1909 and continued with the creation of the Coalition in 1922. The 1910 election was the first to elect a majority government, with the Australian Labor Party concurrently winning the first Senate majority. Prior to 1909 a three-party system existed in the chamber. In 1919, the voting system changed from first-past-the-post to preferential voting. The two-party-preferred vote (2PP) has been commonly used since the 1970s to analyse how voting patterns relate to the seats won. ALP = Australian Labor Party, L+NP = grouping of Liberal/National/LNP/CLP Coalition parties (and predecessors), Oth = other parties and independents.

House of Representatives results
Election Year		Labor	Free Trade	Protectionist	Independent	Other parties		Total seats
1st	1901	14	28	31	2			75
Election Year		Labor	Free Trade	Protectionist	Independent	Other parties		Total seats
2nd	1903	23	25	26		1	Revenue Tariff	75
Election Year		Labor	Anti-Socialist	Protectionist	Independent	Other parties		Total seats
3rd	1906	26	26	21	1	1	Western Australian	75

	Primary vote			2PP vote		Seats			
Election	ALP	L+NP	Oth.	ALP	L+NP	ALP	L+NP	Oth.	Total
1901	19.4%	–	80.6% (Note: Protectionist (44.4%), Free Trade (34.2%), Independent Labor (0.6%), Others (2%))	–	–	14	–	61 (Note: Protectionist (31), Free Trade (28), Independent Labor (1), Other (1))	75
1903	31.0%	–	69% (Note: Protectionist (29.7%), Free Trade (34.4%), Others (5%))	–	–	23	–	52 (Note: Protectionist (26), Free Trade (25), Revenue Tariff (1))	75
1906	36.6%	–	63.4% (Note: Protectionist (16.4%), Anti-Socialists (38.2%), Others (8.7%))	–	–	26	–	49 (Note: Protectionist (16), Anti-Socialists (27), Others (6))	75
1910	50.0%	45.1%	4.9%	–	–	42	31	2	75
1913	48.5%	48.9%	2.6%	–	–	37	38	0	75
1914	50.9%	47.2%	1.9%	–	–	42	32	1	75
1917	43.9%	54.2%	1.9%	–	–	22	53	0	75
1919	42.5%	54.3%	3.2%	45.9%	54.1%	26	38	1	75
1922	42.3%	47.8%	9.9%	48.8%	51.2%	29	40	6	75
1925	45.0%	53.2%	1.8%	46.2%	53.8%	23	50	2	75
1928	44.7%	49.6%	5.8%	48.4%	51.6%	31	42	2	75
1929	48.8%	44.2%	7.0%	56.7%	43.3%	46	24	5	75
1931	37.8% (Note: 27.1% (ALP) + 10.6% (Lang Labor))	48.4%	24.5%	41.5%	58.5%	14	50	11	75
1934	41.2% (Note: 26.8% (ALP) + 14.4% (Lang Labor))	45.6%	27.6%	46.5%	53.5%	18	42	14	74
1937	43.1%	49.3%	7.5%	49.4%	50.6%	29	43	2	74
1940	40.1%	43.9%	15.9%	50.3%	49.7%	32	36	6	74
1943	49.9%	31.3%	18.6%	58.2%	41.8%	49	23	2	74
1946	49.7%	39.3%	11.0%	54.1%	45.9%	43	26	5	74
1949	46.0%	50.3%	3.7%	49.0%	51.0%	47	74	0	121
1951	47.7%	50.3%	2.1%	49.3%	50.7%	52	69	0	121
1954	50.1%	46.8%	3.2%	50.7%	49.3%	57	64	0	121
1955	44.7%	47.6%	7.8%	45.8%	54.2%	47	75	0	122
1958	42.9%	46.6%	10.6%	45.9%	54.1%	45	77	0	122
1961	48.0%	42.1%	10.0%	50.5%	49.5%	60	62	0	122
1963	45.5%	46.0%	8.5%	47.4%	52.6%	50	72	0	122
1966	40.0%	50.0%	10.0%	43.1%	56.9%	41	82	1	124
1969	47.0%	43.3%	9.7%	50.2%	49.8%	59	66	0	125
1972	49.6%	41.5%	8.9%	52.7%	47.3%	67	58	0	125
1974	49.3%	44.9%	5.8%	51.7%	48.3%	66	61	0	127
1975	42.8%	53.1%	4.1%	44.3%	55.7%	36	91	0	127
1977	39.6%	48.1%	12.2%	45.4%	54.6%	38	86	0	124
1980	45.1%	46.3%	8.5%	49.6%	50.4%	51	74	0	125
1983	59.5%	43.6%	6.9%	53.2%	46.8%	75	50	0	125
1984	47.5%	45.0%	7.4%	51.8%	48.2%	82	66	0	148
1987	45.8%	46.1%	8.1%	50.8%	49.2%	86	62	0	148
1990	39.4%	43.5%	17.1%	49.9%	50.1%	78	69	1	148
1993	44.9%	44.3%	10.7%	51.4%	48.6%	80	65	2	147
1996	38.8%	47.3%	14.0%	46.4%	53.6%	49	94	5	148
1998	40.1%	39.5%	20.4%	51.0%	49.0%	67	80	1	148
2001	37.8%	43.0%	19.2%	49.0%	51.0%	65	82	3	150
2004	37.6%	46.7%	15.7%	47.3%	52.7%	60	87	3	150
2007	43.4%	42.1%	14.5%	52.7%	47.3%	83	65	2	150
2010	38.0%	43.3%	18.7%	50.1%	49.9%	72	72	6	150
2013	33.4%	45.6%	21.0%	46.5%	53.5%	55	90	5	150
2016	34.7%	42.0%	23.3%	49.6%	50.4%	69	76	5	150
2019	33.3%	41.4%	25.2%	48.5%	51.5%	68	77	6	151
2022	32.6%	35.7%	31.7%	52.1%	47.9%	77	58	16	151
2025	34.6%	31.8%	33.6%	55.2%	44.8%	94	43	13	150

== Historical party composition of the Senate ==
The Senate has included representatives from a range of political parties, including several parties that have seldom or never had representation in the House of Representatives, but which have consistently secured a small but significant level of electoral support, as the table shows.

Results represent the composition of the Senate after the elections. The full Senate has been contested on eight occasions; the inaugural election and seven double dissolutions. These are highlighted in puce.

Election Year		ALP Labor	LIB Liberal (Note: Includes results for the Free Trade Party for 1901 and 1903, the Anti-Socialist Party for 1906, the Commonwealth Liberal Party for 1910—1914, the Nationalist Party for 1917—1929, and the United Australia Party for 1931—1943.)		NAT National (Note: Includes results for the Country Party for 1919—1974 and the National Country Party for 1975—1980.)	DLP Labor DLP	DEM Democrats	GRN Greens	CLP CLP	IND Independent	Other parties		Total seats	Electoral system
Election Year		ALP Labor	LIB Liberal		NAT National	DLP Labor DLP	DEM Democrats	GRN Greens	CLP CLP	IND Independent	Name	Seats	Total seats	Electoral system
1st	1901	8	11 (Note: Protectionist Party)	17	—N/a	—N/a	—N/a	—N/a	—N/a	—N/a	—N/a	—N/a	36	(Note: Plurality-at-large voting)
2nd	1903	8	12	14	—N/a	—N/a	—N/a	—N/a	—N/a	1	Revenue Tariff	1	36	
3rd	1906	15	6	13	—N/a	—N/a	—N/a	—N/a	—N/a	2	—N/a	—N/a	36	
4th	1910	22	14		—N/a	—N/a	—N/a	—N/a	—N/a	—N/a	—N/a	—N/a	36	
5th	1913	29	7		—N/a	—N/a	—N/a	—N/a	—N/a	—N/a	—N/a	—N/a	36	
6th	1914	31	5		—N/a	—N/a	—N/a	—N/a	—N/a	—N/a	—N/a	—N/a	36	
7th	1917	12	24		—N/a	—N/a	—N/a	—N/a	—N/a	—N/a	—N/a	—N/a	36	
8th	1919	1	35		—N/a	—N/a	—N/a	—N/a	—N/a	—N/a	—N/a	—N/a	36	(Note: Preferential block voting)
9th	1922	12	24		—N/a	—N/a	—N/a	—N/a	—N/a	—N/a	—N/a	—N/a	36	
10th	1925	8	25		3	—N/a	—N/a	—N/a	—N/a	—N/a	—N/a	—N/a	36	
11th	1928	7	24		5	—N/a	—N/a	—N/a	—N/a	—N/a	—N/a	—N/a	36	
12th	1931	10	21		5	—N/a	—N/a	—N/a	—N/a	—N/a	—N/a	—N/a	36	
13th	1934	3	26		7	—N/a	—N/a	—N/a	—N/a	—N/a	—N/a	—N/a	36	
14th	1937	16	16		4	—N/a	—N/a	—N/a	—N/a	—N/a	—N/a	—N/a	36	
15th	1940	17	15		4	—N/a	—N/a	—N/a	—N/a	—N/a	—N/a	—N/a	36	
16th	1943	22	12		2	—N/a	—N/a	—N/a	—N/a	—N/a	—N/a	—N/a	36	
17th	1946	33	2		1	—N/a	—N/a	—N/a	—N/a	—N/a	—N/a	—N/a	36	
18th	1949	34	21		5	—N/a	—N/a	—N/a	—N/a	—N/a	—N/a	—N/a	60	
19th	1951	28	26		6	—N/a	—N/a	—N/a	—N/a	—N/a	—N/a	—N/a	60	(Note: Single transferable vote)
20th	1953	29	26		5	—N/a	—N/a	—N/a	—N/a	—N/a	—N/a	—N/a	60	
21st	1955	28	24		6	2	—N/a	—N/a	—N/a	—N/a	—N/a	—N/a	60	
22nd	1958	26	25		7	2	—N/a	—N/a	—N/a	—N/a	—N/a	—N/a	60	
23rd	1961	28	24		6	1	—N/a	—N/a	—N/a	1	—N/a	—N/a	60	
24th	1964	27	23		7	2	—N/a	—N/a	—N/a	1	—N/a	—N/a	60	
25th	1967	27	21		7	4	—N/a	—N/a	—N/a	1	—N/a	—N/a	60	
26th	1970	26	21		5	5	—N/a	—N/a	—N/a	3	—N/a	—N/a	60	
27th	1974	29	23		6	—N/a	—N/a	—N/a	—N/a	1	Liberal Movement	1	60	
28th	1975	27	26		8	—N/a	—N/a	—N/a	1	1	Liberal Movement	1	64	
29th	1977	27	27		6	—N/a	2	—N/a	1	1	—N/a	—N/a	64	
30th	1980	27	27		3	—N/a	5	—N/a	1	1	—N/a	—N/a	64	
31st	1983	30	23		4	—N/a	5	—N/a	1	1	—N/a	—N/a	64	
32nd	1984	34	27		5	—N/a	7	—N/a	1	1	Nuclear Disarmament	1	76	(Note: Preferential block voting (Group voting ticket))
33rd	1987	32	26		7	—N/a	7	—N/a	1	2	Nuclear Disarmament	1	76	
34th	1990	32	28		5	—N/a	8	—N/a	1	1	Greens (WA)	1	76	
35th	1993	30	29		6	—N/a	7	—N/a	1	1	Greens (WA)	2	76	
36th	1996	29	31		5	—N/a	7	—N/a	1	1	Greens (WA)	1	76	
36th	1996	29	31		5	—N/a	7	—N/a	1	1	Greens (Tas)	1	76	
36th	1996	29	31		5	—N/a	7	—N/a	1	1	Total	2	76	
37th	1998	29	31		3	—N/a	9	1	1	1	One Nation	1	76	
38th	2001	28	31		3	—N/a	8	2	1	2	One Nation	1	76	
39th	2004	28	33		5	—N/a	4	4	1	—N/a	Family First	1	76	
40th	2007	32	32		4	—N/a	—N/a	5	1	1	Family First	1	76	
41st	2010	31	28 (+3 LNP)		2	1	—N/a	9	1	1	—N/a	—N/a	76	
42nd	2013	25	23 (+5 LNP)		3 (+1 LNP)	1	—N/a	10	1	1	Family First	1	76	
42nd	2013	25	23 (+5 LNP)		3 (+1 LNP)	1	—N/a	10	1	1	Liberal Democrats	1	76	
42nd	2013	25	23 (+5 LNP)		3 (+1 LNP)	1	—N/a	10	1	1	Motoring Enthusiast	1	76	
42nd	2013	25	23 (+5 LNP)		3 (+1 LNP)	1	—N/a	10	1	1	Palmer United	3	76	
42nd	2013	25	23 (+5 LNP)		3 (+1 LNP)	1	—N/a	10	1	1	Total	6	76	
43rd	2016	26	21 (+3 LNP)		3 (+2 LNP)	—N/a	—N/a	9	1	—N/a	Family First	1	76	(Note: Single transferable vote (Optional preferential voting))
43rd	2016	26	21 (+3 LNP)		3 (+2 LNP)	—N/a	—N/a	9	1	—N/a	Liberal Democrats	1	76	(Note: Single transferable vote (Optional preferential voting))
43rd	2016	26	21 (+3 LNP)		3 (+2 LNP)	—N/a	—N/a	9	1	—N/a	Jacqui Lambie	1	76	(Note: Single transferable vote (Optional preferential voting))
43rd	2016	26	21 (+3 LNP)		3 (+2 LNP)	—N/a	—N/a	9	1	—N/a	Justice Party	1	76	(Note: Single transferable vote (Optional preferential voting))
43rd	2016	26	21 (+3 LNP)		3 (+2 LNP)	—N/a	—N/a	9	1	—N/a	Nick Xenophon Team	3	76	(Note: Single transferable vote (Optional preferential voting))
43rd	2016	26	21 (+3 LNP)		3 (+2 LNP)	—N/a	—N/a	9	1	—N/a	One Nation	4	76	(Note: Single transferable vote (Optional preferential voting))
43rd	2016	26	21 (+3 LNP)		3 (+2 LNP)	—N/a	—N/a	9	1	—N/a	Total	11	76	(Note: Single transferable vote (Optional preferential voting))
44th	2019	26	26 (+4 LNP)		2 (+2 LNP)	—N/a	—N/a	9	1	1	Jacqui Lambie	1	76	
44th	2019	26	26 (+4 LNP)		2 (+2 LNP)	—N/a	—N/a	9	1	1	Centre Alliance	2	76	
44th	2019	26	26 (+4 LNP)		2 (+2 LNP)	—N/a	—N/a	9	1	1	One Nation	2	76	
44th	2019	26	26 (+4 LNP)		2 (+2 LNP)	—N/a	—N/a	9	1	1	Total	5	76	
45th	2022	26	23 (+5 LNP)		3	—N/a	—N/a	12	1	1	United Australia	1	76	(Note: Single transferable vote (Proportional representation))
45th	2022	26	23 (+5 LNP)		3	—N/a	—N/a	12	1	1	Jacqui Lambie	2	76	(Note: Single transferable vote (Proportional representation))
45th	2022	26	23 (+5 LNP)		3	—N/a	—N/a	12	1	1	One Nation	2	76	(Note: Single transferable vote (Proportional representation))
45th	2022	26	23 (+5 LNP)		3	—N/a	—N/a	12	1	1	Total	5	76	(Note: Single transferable vote (Proportional representation))
46th	2025	28	26		9	—N/a	—N/a	11	1	4	Jacqui Lambie	1	76	
46th	2025	28	26		9	—N/a	—N/a	11	1	4	United Australia	1	76	
46th	2025	28	26		9	—N/a	—N/a	11	1	4	Australia's Voice	1	76	
46th	2025	28	26		9	—N/a	—N/a	11	1	4	People First	1	76	
46th	2025	28	26		9	—N/a	—N/a	11	1	4	One Nation	2	76	
46th	2025	28	26		9	—N/a	—N/a	11	1	4	Total	6	76	

== See also ==
- Censorship in Australia
- Far-right politics in Australia
- Hate speech laws in Australia
- List of sanctions involving Australia
- Politics of New South Wales
- Politics of Victoria
- Politics of Queensland
- Politics of South Australia
- Politics of Tasmania
- Politics of Western Australia
- Political donations in Australia
- Political families of Australia
- Proportional Representation Society of Australia
- Referendums in Australia
