= Khirbet Zanuta =

Palestinian village in Hebron Governorate, State of Palestine

Khirbet Zanuta خربة زنوتا (Arabic)
- Local Development Committee
- Location of Khirbet Zanuta within Palestine
- Coordinates: 31°22′15″N 34°59′44″E
- Palestine grid: 149/086
- State: State of Palestine
- Governorate: Hebron

Government
  - Type: Local Development Committee

Area
  - Total: 12.0 km^{2} (4.6 sq mi)

Population (2017)
  - Total: 131
  - Density: 10.9/km^{2} (28.3/sq mi)
- Name meaning: "The ruin of Zanuta"

Khirbet Zanuta (Arabic: خربة زنوتا, romanized: the ruin of Zanuta) was a Palestinian Bedouin village in the Hebron Governorate in the southern West Bank, located 20 kilometers south of Hebron. It was ethnically cleansed during the 2023 Gaza war. Some farmers remained or returned and the attacks continued. Israeli settlers destroyed the village school and most houses, and the IDF has refused to give its expelled residents permission to rebuild.

Neighbouring villages include ad-Dhahiriya to the northwest and Khirbet Shweika to the northwest, as well as two Israeli settlements, Teneh Omarim to the west and Shim'a to the east. The Meitarim industrial zone just to its east was built for the settlers. The village is adjacent to the Green Line.

== Population ==
In 1997, six residents were recorded. According to the Palestinian Central Bureau of Statistics (PCBS), Zanuta had a population of 60 in the 2007 census. In 2012 the number of families registered at Zanuta was 27. By 2013 it had 130 residents. The population of the village was 131 in 2017. At the time of its depopulation in 2023, Zunata's population totaled about 250 people.

The four principal families are the as-Samamera, al-Tel, al-Batat and al-Qaysiyah.

== Economy ==
Agriculture is the main economic activity, employing most of the village's working residents. The total land area is approximately 12,000 dunams, of which roughly 3,000 are cultivated, mostly with field crops. Much of the remaining land area is considered "open spaces," while one dunam is classified as built-up areas.

== History ==
Zanuta was a cave settlement of local peoples predating both the foundation of Israel (1948) and Israel's occupation of the West Bank after the Six-Day War in 1967, and archaeological studies attest to continuous habitation at the site from the Byzantine to the Ottoman period, when it eventually dwindled to "a settlement of shepherds and fellahs living in the remains of the ancient structures and the residential caves alongside them," of families that, according to Shuli Hartman, came to the caves from the nearby town of ad-Dhahiriya in the early 20th century.

=== Pre-19th century ===
Pottery sherds at Zanuta indicate continuous settlement since the Iron Age, and archeologist Avi Ofer has proposed an identification of the site with Dana in the fifth group of Judean cities in the south Hebron hills. Some of the ruins apparently dated to Byzantine period, but there was also signs of the recent destruction of a village. Byzantine pottery has been found in the village.

=== 19th century ===
David Grossman writes it was a large cave settlement in the early 1800s.

German explorer Ulrich Jasper Seetzen passed through "Zanutah" in March 1809, noting: "It was 2 o'clock in the afternoon when we arrived in Zanutah. This village is the last inhabited place on this side of Hebron, and about half an hour further south the territory of the Bedouin Btei'ah tribe begins. Zanutah is a destroyed village, among the ruins of which a few Muslim farming families live in cellars and caves. There is only one house left here, which was called the mosque, although it is now used to accommodate guests, where we also left and stayed the night." The place functioned at that time as a commercial station between Hebron and Egypt; a consequence of the caravan-routes shifting inland since the Napoleonic invasion. French explorer and amateur archaeologist Victor Guérin passed through the area in 1863, and described its ruins, which were strewn over the summit and flanks of the hill. He found:

Numerous tumbled-down houses, of average size, that had mostly been built in earlier times from regularly cut stones, nearly all of which enclosed a cave drilled out of the rockface; cisterns lay around on all sides, and there was a pool (birket) dug partially from the rock, and partially built from stone, measuring 20 by 17 paces. There were also traces of an ancient mosque, constructed, particularly in its corners, with magnificent masonry that had no doubt been harvested from a Christian basilica (Note: Conder and Kitchener: 'These ruins seem probably of Byzantine period, but there are remains of a village probably destroyed in recent times.' p.411.) ... Not to be overlooked also were the remains of a small freestone structure, with all the appearance of a sanctuary, perhaps a mausoleum dating back to the Roman period. All that survives of it is a section of wall rising from the bedrock and embellished with two pilasters (Note: Conder and Kitchener corrected this later: 'The wall of a building is standing in a line 15° west of north. It has five pilasters, which stand on a podium or stylobate, and project 1 inch. Their shafts are 17 inches broad. The total length of the wall is 23 feet. It appears to be the entire length of one side of a monument. Three courses of the wall are standing throughout; and in part towards the north five. Between the second and third pilasters from the north there is a niche in the wall with a domed roof, ornamented with a cockle-shell pattern. The niche is 19 inches wide, 8 inches deep, and 2 feet 4 inches high inside. The bottom is on the top of the third course of stones; the niche faced east approximately. The masonry is of well-cut ashlar, of square proportions, and not drafted.' Conder and Kitchener, 1883, SWP III, p. 410) between which one can see a vaulted niche touched off with elegant mouldings and probably designed to house a small statue.

In 1838, Edward Robinson and noted Za'nutah as a ruin located southwest of el-Khulil.

The Survey of Western Palestine noted that in 1874 there were the remains of a "good-sized mosque" to the south of the above-mentioned building, and many caves with arches in front of their doors, as well as the remains of a "tower foundation, which was feet 30 square, with walls 3 feet thick", as well as five pilasters on a podium, domed niches, and well-cut ashlar masonry.

=== 20th century ===
When the caves became uninhabitable in the 1980s, the villagers built stone houses with tin and plastic roofs to dwell in, and kept external pens and the caves as shelters for their sheep.

=== 21st century ===
==== 2000s-2010s ====
In 2007, Zanuta residents, assisted by the Association for Civil Rights in Israel, filed a joint petition to the High Court of Justice asking that the Civil Administration provide them with a complete construction plan. As a result of the petition they received an interim order from the court. In 2011, an Israeli NGO Regavim, whose objective, according to Hass is 'to protect what it calls national (Jewish) land and to demolish Palestinian structures built without a permit,' revived the case, filing an amicus curiae request, at which the state of Israel then submitted a full reply to the Zanuta villagers' petition.

As one of a dozen villages in the South Hebron Hills, Zanuta was slated for demolition by the IDF, and the villagers wee to be expelled from Area C of the West Bank to areas under Palestinian authority (Area A or Area B). The Israeli civil administration claimed that the demolition order was because Zunata lies directly over an archeological site recognized under the British mandate, and therefore regularisation of their village structures is ruled out. Archeologist Avi Ofer, who did his doctoral research on the area, expressed astonishment at the extent of the area -120 dunams (30 acres), - defined as the "Zanuta archaeology site" by the Civil Administration. In his view, the real site covers half or less that size.

To The Guardian one shepherd stated: "We have no choice but to be here, this is how we were raised and this is how we live,"... "The only thing we know how to do is raise sheep. We can only do that here.”

According to Amira Hass, while calling for the demolition of Palestinian villages, Israeli authorities approved construction in Jewish settlements on more imposing archaeological sites, such as the settlement at Tel Rumeida in Hebron, or in Jerusalem itself. The state declared that the military were not obliged to find a solution for the villagers, and demands that they be moved out to ad-Dhahiriya. In response to petitions by the villagers, the High Court has ruled that the state had 30 days to find a solution to the impasse either by providing permits or making appropriate arrangements for the villagers.

On 29 August 2012, the Israeli governing authority in the West Bank destroyed two cisterns, some used to catch rainfall, used by Zanuta shepherds and farmers. Three others were destroyed at nearby Khirbet Anizat. Together they lost five sheepfolds, two tents, a tin shack and two improvised food storage sheds. According to Zanuta residents one of the cisterns was hundreds of years old. Some of the cisterns were created with the assistance of a Polish NGO.

Legal battles regarding the demolition of the village continued into October 2013.

=== 2020s ===
In 2021, Israeli settler Yinon Levi set up the nearby outpost Havata Meitarim (Meitarim Farm). The residents of the outpost then began to wrest control of most of the village's grazing lands and cisterns, while assaulting shepherds, uprooting trees and running over sheep with all-terrain vehicles. This included an attack in 2022. On 17 November 2023, just over a month after the outbreak of the Gaza war, in the wake of ten serious attacks on the village, the 35 families comprising Zanuta fled the village, fearing for the safety of themselves and their flocks. In December 2023, it was reported that ten homes and a school had been demolished in Khirbet Zanuta, with Stars of David spray painted on the remains of the school, which had been constructed using European Union funds. The destruction was described by EU representatives as a violation of international humanitarian law. The demolitions followed prolonged threats from armed Israeli settlers who reside in nearby illegal settlements. Breaking the Silence deputy director Nadav Weiman, an Israeli special forces veteran, accused the bulldozer-owning Yinon Levi of being the sole culprit behind the emptying of Zanuta, with Weiman referring to Zanuta's bulldozed school: "Why demolish the school? ... Because you want families to feel they are not safe here. With no school, the kids cannot return. And if you don't have kids, you don't have life."

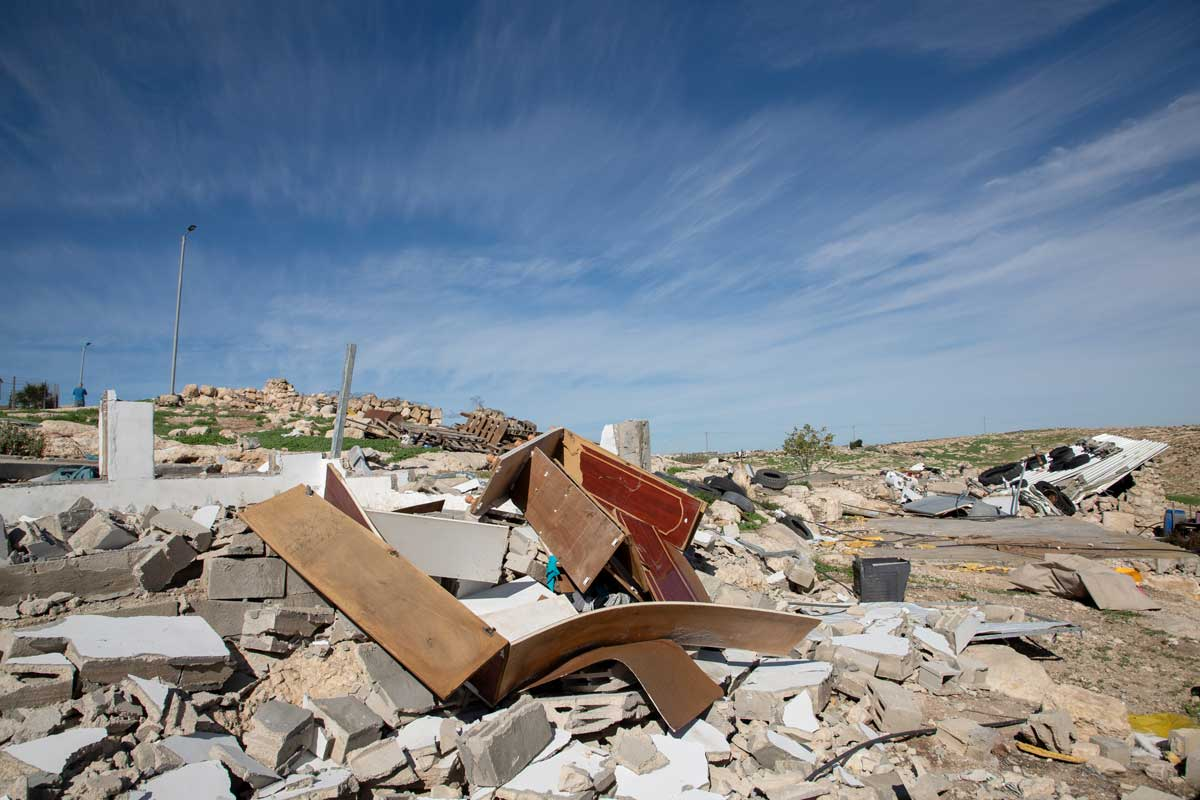
Destroyed homes in Zanuta (16 December 2023)

In 2024, the governments of the United States and the United Kingdom sanctioned Israeli settler Yinon Levi, who set up residence near Zanuta, for violence against Palestinians. The New York Times has described the illegal settlement Levi constructed in 2021 and now owns, Meitarim Farm, as 'a base of operations for settler attacks', Levi denied the charge. Levi responded that he wanted to make sure that the lands in the area "remain under Jewish ownership … When there is a Jewish presence, then there is no Arab presence. […] when the bad people are against you, you must be doing something right."

BBC News reported in March 2024 that Zanuta was "deserted"; NPR similarly reported that month that Zanuta was "abandoned". In October 2024, the U.K. characterized the Meitarim outpost as one of several which were “involved in facilitating, inciting, promoting or providing support for activity that amounts to a serious abuse of the right of Palestinians not to be subjected to cruel, inhuman or degrading treatment or punishment.”

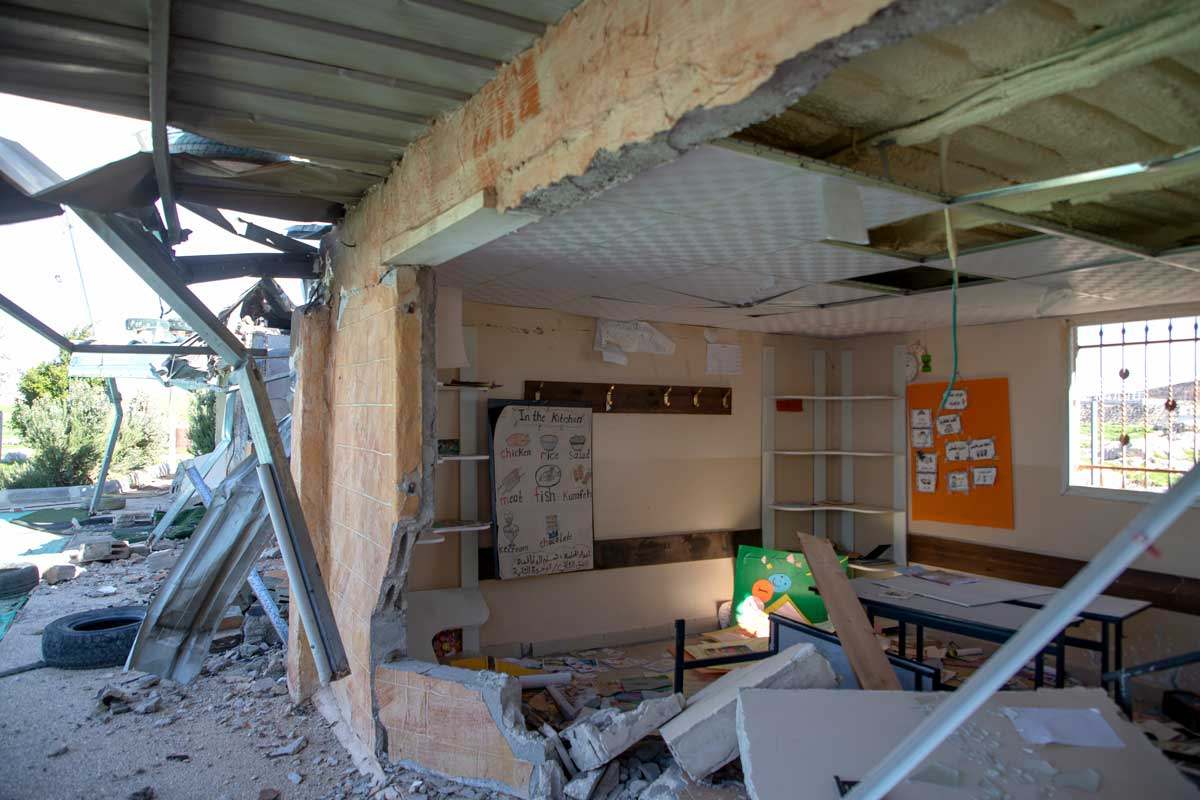
Zanuta's school, following settler destruction (2023).

The villagers petitioned the Israeli High Court of Justice which, in July 2024, ruled that the state must allow the villagers to return and protect both them and their property. In response, the state requested a delay in the implementation of the court's decision and, in the meantime, 90% of what remained of the village was torn down, including the last remaining 40 olive trees. The military Civil Administration has refused them permission to spread tent covers over the ruins to allow some protection from the sun. Some animals remained in their pens after the devastation, with their owners sheltering in the ruins. In early September 2024, the Israeli Civil Administration arrived and confiscated the fencing used for the pens.

On 8 July 2026, US Congressman Ro Khanna visited the depopulated village, when Israeli settlers carrying M4 rifles held his delegation for more than an hour while Israeli soldiers initially stood with them; police eventually allowed the group to leave. During the inspection of the village, the congressman the observed the destruction of local infrastructure, including a burned-out European Union-funded children school (see photo on the right).

== Bibliography ==
- Conder, C.R.; Kitchener, H.H. (1883). The Survey of Western Palestine: Memoirs of the Topography, Orography, Hydrography, and Archaeology. Vol. 3. London: Committee of the Palestine Exploration Fund.
- Dauphin, C. (1998). La Palestine byzantine, Peuplement et Populations. BAR International Series 726 (in French). Vol. III : Catalogue. Oxford: Archeopress. ISBN 0-860549-05-4.
- Guérin, V. (1869). Description Géographique Historique et Archéologique de la Palestine (in French). Vol. 1: Judee, pt. 3. Paris: L'Imprimerie Nationale.
- Palmer, E.H. (1881). The Survey of Western Palestine: Arabic and English Name Lists Collected During the Survey by Lieutenants Conder and Kitchener, R. E. Transliterated and Explained by E.H. Palmer. Committee of the Palestine Exploration Fund.
- Seetzen, Ulrich Jasper (1855). Ulrich Jasper Seetzen's Reisen durch Syrien, Palästina, Phönicien, die Transjordan-länder, Arabia Petraea und Unter-Aegypten (in German). Vol. 3. Berlin: G. Reimer.
- Tsafrir, Y.; Leah Di Segni; Judith Green (1994). (TIR): Tabula Imperii Romani: Judaea, Palaestina. Jerusalem: Israel Academy of Sciences and Humanities. p. 261. ISBN 965-208-107-8.
