= Meitarim Farm =

Meitarim Farm חוות מיתרים
- Established: 2021; 5 years ago

Meitarim Farm (Hebrew: חוות מיתרים, romanized: Chavat Meitarim) is an Israeli outpost in the West Bank, located in the Har Hevron Regional Council.

The outpost was established in 2021 by the Israeli settler Yinon Levi. The settler organization Amana, was also involved in the arrangement, and the outpost has received volunteer support from the organization Hashomer Yosh.

The international community considers Israeli settlements in the West Bank illegal under international law, whereas Israeli outposts, like Meitarim Farm, are considered illegal not only under international law but also under Israeli law.

Meitarim Farm is situated near the Israeli settlements of Teneh Omarim and Shim'a, and roughly 1 km from the Palestinian village of Khirbet Zanuta.

== Sanctions ==
Meitarim Farm was sanctioned by the United States Department of State on 11 July 2024.

It was also sanctioned by the United Kingdom's Foreign, Commonwealth and Development Office on 15 October 2024 and by Australia in June 2026.
