= List of sanctions involving Australia =

This is a list of economic sanctions involving Australia.

== By Australia ==
Country/organisation	Time period	Notes and references
Al-Qaeda	2008–present	
Belarus	2022–present	In response to the Russo-Ukrainian War.
Central African Republic	2013–present	
Democratic Republic of Congo	2003–present	
Fiji	2006-2014	
Guinea-Bissau	2012–present	
Iran	2006–present	
Iraq	1990–present	In response to the Iraqi invasion of Kuwait. Although sanctions were relaxed after the Saddam Hussein era, some sanctions are still in place.
Islamic State	2008–present	
Lebanon	2005–present	In response to the Hezbollah–Israel conflict and the 2005 Beirut bombing. Generally only applies to Hezbollah and associated organisations and individuals.
Libya	2011–present	
Mali	2017–present	
Myanmar	1990–present	Relaxed from 2012 to 2018
North Korea	2006–present	
Russia (Note: Also includes: Republic of Crimea; Sevastopol)	2014–present	In response to the Russo-Ukrainian War. Extended in 2022.
Serbia and Montenegro	1992-1995	Individuals associated with Slobodan Milosević are still sanctioned.
Somalia	1992–present	
South Sudan	2015–present	Expanded in 2018.
Sudan	2004–present	
Syria	2011–present	
Taliban	2013–present	Tightened in 2021. Because the Taliban currently controls Afghanistan, the sanctions may partly apply to Afghanistan as a whole.
Yemen	2014–present	
Zimbabwe	2002–present	Relaxed in 2013 and again in 2014.

== On Australia ==
Country	Time period	Notes and references
China	2020–present	Part of the Australia-China trade war.
Russia	2022–present	In response to Australian sanctions on Russia.

== See also ==
- List of sanctions involving Israel
