= Hashomer Yosh =

Israeli non-government organization

Hashomer Yosh activists, April 2024

Hashomer Yosh (Hebrew: השומר יו"ש, “The Guardian of Judea and Samaria” ) is an Israeli non-governmental organization that supports settlers in the West Bank. The organization describes itself as assisting "the various farmers throughout Judea and Samaria, who bravely protect our lands and stand strong in the face of economic difficulties and frequent agricultural crime." It was founded in 2013. Men wearing Hashomer Yosh clothing have attacked Israeli and Palestinian activists.

== Funding ==
Hashomer Yosh has received funding from Israel's Agriculture Ministry and Ministry for the Development of the Periphery, the Negev and the Galilee. It has also received funding from the Jewish diaspora, including the Central Fund of Israel.

== International sanctions ==
Hashomer Yosh was sanctioned by the US in August 2024 and by the UK in October of that year. The American sanctions were rescinded by incoming President Donald Trump through Executive Order 14148 in January 2025, on his first day back in office. In June 2025 Hashomer Yosh began proceedings to challenge the British sanctions in court. In May 2026 the European Union sanctioned Hashomer Yosh and its president.
