= Francesca Albanese =

Italian legal scholar (born 1977)

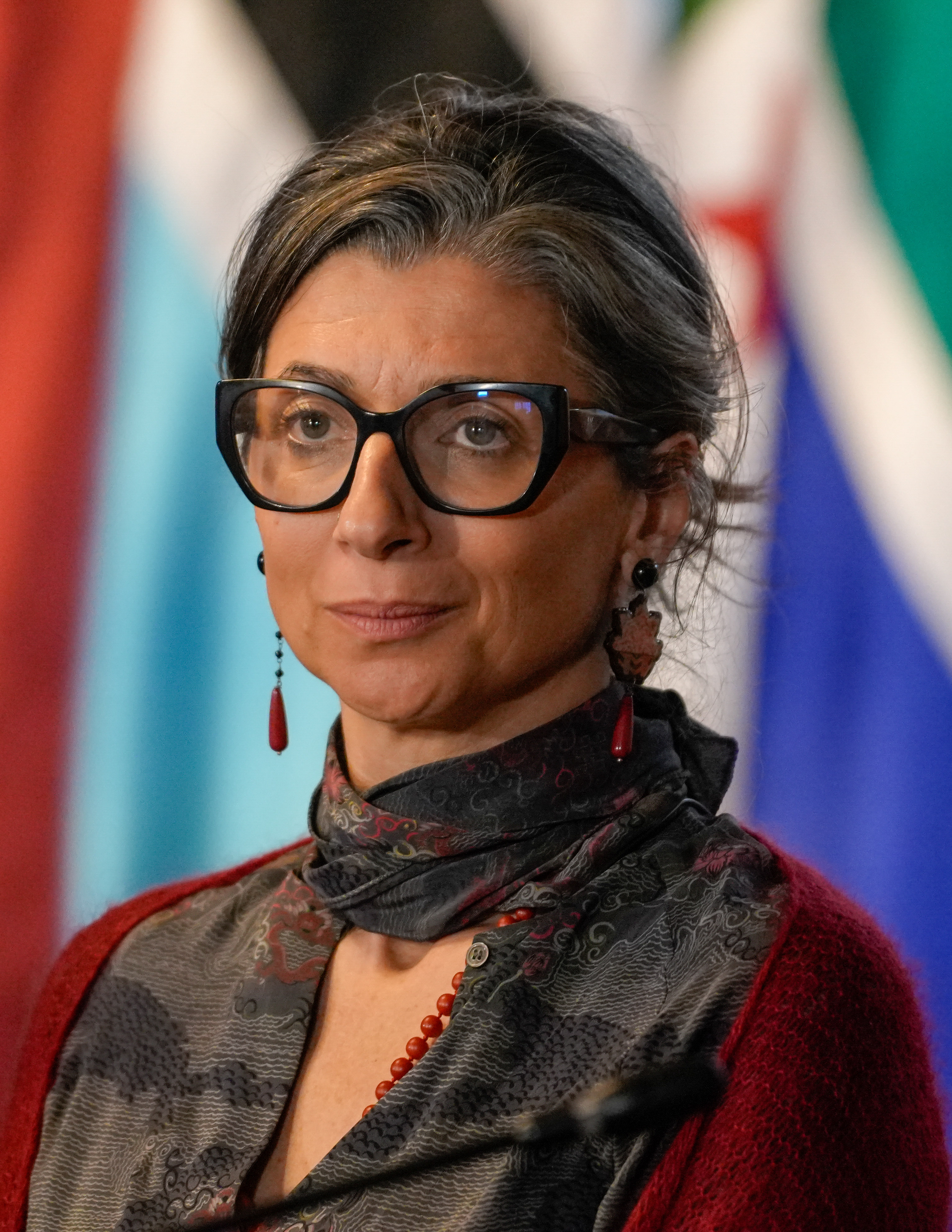
- Albanese at the Hague Group emergency meeting in Bogotá, July 2025

United Nations Special Rapporteur on the occupied Palestinian territories
- Incumbent
- Assumed office 1 May 2022
- Preceded by: Michael Lynk

Personal details
- Born: Francesca Paola Albanese; March 30, 1977 (age 49) Ariano Irpino, Campania, Italy
- Spouse: Massimiliano Calì
- Children: 2
- Education: University of Pisa (LMG); SOAS University of London (LLM)
- Occupation: Academic
- Awards: Order of Civil Merit

Francesca Paola Albanese (Italian: [franˈtʃeska ˈpaːola albaˈneːze, -eːse]; born 30 March 1977) is an Italian legal scholar and expert on human rights. She has served as the United Nations (UN) Special Rapporteur on the occupied Palestinian territories since 1 May 2022; initially appointed for a three-year term, she was confirmed for another three years in April 2025. She is the first woman to hold the position, and has a law degree from the University of Pisa and a Master of Laws in human rights from SOAS University of London.

As part of her position as a UN special rapporteur, Albanese has been critical of Israel's occupation of the Palestinian territories and recommended in her first report that UN member states develop a plan to end the occupation and apartheid. After the Israeli invasion of the Gaza Strip following the October 7 attacks in 2023, Albanese called for an immediate ceasefire and warned that Palestinians in Gaza were at risk of ethnic cleansing. In March 2024, Albanese reported to the UN Human Rights Council that Israel's actions in Gaza amounted to genocide. The UN published a report by Albanese in June 2025 stating that many corporate entities were enabling and profiting from the occupation of Palestinian territories and the Gaza genocide. Shortly thereafter, the United States under the Trump administration imposed sanctions on Albanese under Executive Order 14203 naming her a "specially designated national", forbidding all U.S. persons and companies from doing business with her. She is the first UN official to receive this sanction. The sanctions were temporarily lifted in May 2026 due to a court order, but reinstated after a few days. She has received multiple awards for her work and is a senior advisor on Migration and Forced Displacement at the non-profit Arab Renaissance for Democracy and Development.

US officials under both the Biden and Trump administrations, Israeli officials, pro-Israeli organisations and several European governments have criticised her statements or called for her removal due to concerns about impartiality about Israel and antisemitism. Albanese has said that her criticism of Israel concerns its conduct and violations of international law. Multiple human rights activists and scholars have supported her, including Amnesty International and three former special rapporteurs on the Occupied Palestinian Territories. Her supporters have stated that accusations of antisemitism have been weaponised to try to discredit her work.

== Early life and education ==
Francesca Paola Albanese was born in Ariano Irpino, Italy on 30 March 1977 (Note: https://www.leggo.it/schede/francesca_albanese_eta_marito_palestina_ministero_onu_lavoro_studi_carriera_oggi_7_10_2025-chi_e_francesca_albanese_eta_lavoro_e_vita_privata-2-9112219.html). Her mother was a homemaker, and her father was a lawyer. They were interested in politics and admired judges who confronted the mafia. According to Albanese, she was not fluent in English until her 20s.

Albanese holds a full Italian law degree (LMG with honours from the University of Pisa). In a May 2025 interview, she said that she had studied jurisprudence and had not taken the bar examination because she was more interested in human rights and did not want to practice law in Italy. She later earned a Master of Laws in human rights from SOAS University of London.

== Career ==
Albanese was an affiliate scholar at the Institute for the Study of International Migration at Georgetown University until late 2025, when the University stated it was ended as a result of US sanctions imposed on her. She is a senior advisor on Migration and Forced Displacement at the non-profit Arab Renaissance for Democracy and Development (ARDD), where she co-founded the Global Network on the Question of Palestine. In 2020, she and Lex Takkenberg wrote the OUP-published Palestinian Refugees in International Law.

Albanese worked for a decade as a human rights expert for the UN, including the Office of the UN High Commissioner for Human Rights and the UN Relief and Work Agency for Palestine Refugees. During this period, she advised the UN, governments, and civil society in the Middle East, North Africa, and the Asia Pacific regions on human rights and their application and norms, particularly for vulnerable groups like refugees and migrants. She holds lectures on international law and forced displacement in both European and Arab universities, as well as conferences and public events about the Israeli–Palestinian conflict.

== UN Special Rapporteur on the occupied Palestinian territories ==
On 1 May 2022 Albanese was appointed UN Special Rapporteur on the occupied Palestinian territories for a three-year term. Albanese is the second Italian (after Giorgio Giacomelli) and the first woman to be appointed to the position. Israel opposed her appointment, saying that she had a history of anti-Israel statements. On 18 October 2022, Albanese recommended in her first report that UN member states develop "a plan to end the Israeli settler-colonial occupation and apartheid regime". The report concluded: "The violations described in the present report expose the nature of the Israeli occupation, that of an intentionally acquisitive, segregationist and repressive regime designed to prevent the realization of the Palestinian people's right to self-determination."

In December 2022, The Times of Israel reported on a Facebook post Albanese had made during the 2014 Gaza War. In the post, Albanese said the United States was "subjugated by the Jewish lobby" and Europe by a "sense of guilt about the Holocaust", and that both "condemn the oppressed – the Palestinians" in the conflict. The Israeli Ministry of Foreign Affairs and Michèle Taylor, the US ambassador to the UN Human Rights Council, suggested the comments were antisemitic. Albanese said that she had never been antisemitic and that her criticism of Israel is related to its occupation of Palestinian territories. She has expressed regret for using the phrase "the Jewish lobby" in her post, saying that she was unaware that it was an antisemitic trope and that she was referring to AIPAC's influence in the US.

During the 30th Meeting of the 53rd Regular Session of the UN Human Rights Council in July 2023, Albanese presented a report accusing Israel of turning the West Bank into an "open-air prison". The report said that since 1967, more than 800,000 Palestinians, including children as young as 12, had been arrested and detained by Israeli authorities. Briefing journalists, Albanese said: "There is no other way to define the regime that Israel has imposed on the Palestinians – which is apartheid by default – other than an open-air prison." Israel was not present for the presentation but rejected the findings.

In August 2024, Albanese was one of many UN Special Rapporteurs who signed an open letter to the "International community" on the third anniversary of the Taliban taking change in Afghanistan. They were concerned that the regime's human-rights abuses particularly against women and girls may become accepted. They encouraged the International Criminal Court (ICC) to take urgent action against those responsible.

Albanese was confirmed in the position for another three years in April 2025.

In September 2026, Albanese stated that the Western world should stop sending weapons to Ukraine during the Russo-Ukrainian War and seek a political solution. She accused both NATO and the United States of prolonging the conflict, and stated that Russia's invasion of Ukraine was unlawful. When asked how she believed the war should end, Albanese said she did not have a solution because she was not an expert.

Later that month, Albanese apologized in a social media post on X for saying in an interview that Jews in Nazi death camps were referred to as Muslims and that the word antisemitism had originally referred to hatred of all "Semitic peoples". Holocaust memorial organization Yad Vashem criticized Albanese for the remarks, describing them as "clear and dangerous historical revisionism". Albanese said she had "misread the term 'Muselmann' (Muslim) used in Nazi camps for prisoners at the brink of death, wrongly inferring that the term antisemitism originally meant hatred of all Semitic peoples" rather than having been invented as a term to specifically denote hatred of Jews. A statement from Yad Vashem said that Albanese should "familiarize herself with the history she seeks to address, particularly the rise of Nazi antisemitism and the ideology that paved the way for the Holocaust, before making assertions about it".

In November 2026, Albanese spoke in the Irish parliament, stating that testimonies from people who had been tortured indicated that Palestinians have been "raped by dogs trained in European countries" and that "Israel has always killed children, extrajudicial killings, arbitrary detention, the use of torture, even rape". She asked Ireland to use its presidency of the European Union to stop the EU being "complicit with what Israel is doing with the colonisation of what remains of Palestine”. Her speech was criticised by the Israeli Foreign Ministry and by the Jewish Representative Council of Ireland.

=== Gaza war ===
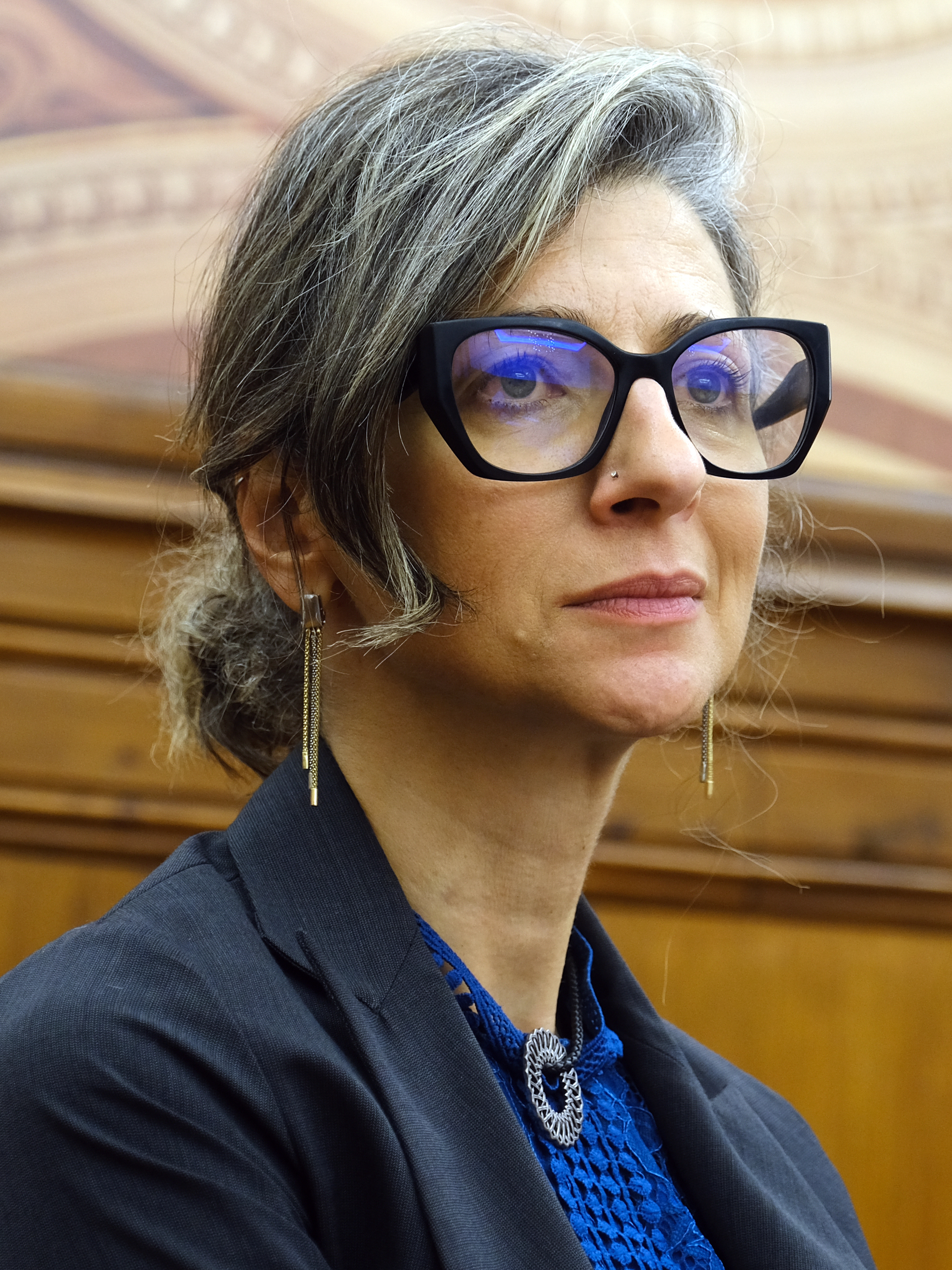
Albanese in July 2024

In 2023, after the outbreak of the Gaza war, Albanese called for an immediate ceasefire, warning that "Palestinians are in grave danger of a mass ethnic cleansing." She further stated that the international community must "prevent and protect populations from atrocity crimes", and that "accountability for international crimes committed by Israeli occupation forces and Hamas must also be immediately pursued".

In February 2024, French President Emmanuel Macron described the October 7 attacks as "the largest antisemitic massacre of our century". Albanese responded on X (formerly Twitter) that "the victims of the October 7 massacre were killed not because of their Judaism, but in response to Israeli oppression". The French Foreign Ministry condemned her remarks and the Israeli government declared Albanese persona non grata in Israel and denied her future entry to the country. In response to the reactions, Albanese said: "I regret that some interpreted my tweet as 'justifying' Hamas's crimes, which I have condemned strongly several times. I reject all forms of racism, including antisemitism. However, labeling these crimes as 'antisemitic' obscures the real reason they occurred."

On 26 March 2024, Albanese presented the report "Anatomy of a Genocide" before the 55th session of the UN Human Rights Council in Geneva. She stated there are reasonable grounds to believe that Israel is intentionally committing genocidal acts against Palestinians in Gaza. Albanese called for sanctions and an arms embargo against Israel. At a press conference about the report, she stated that Israel is misusing international humanitarian law to justify its genocidal actions in Gaza. The report was condemned by the Israeli ambassador to the UN in Geneva who stated that Israel is targeting Hamas rather than Palestinian civilians. According to Albanese, she received death threats after the report was released.

She was one of the many UN experts who spoke out against the sale of arms to Israel in June 2024 to be used in the conflict in Gaza. The experts cautioned arms suppliers and finance companies that they would be implicated in human rights violations. The signatories to the warning included special reporteurs Paula Gaviria Betancur, Tlaleng Mofokeng, and Margaret Satterthwaite.

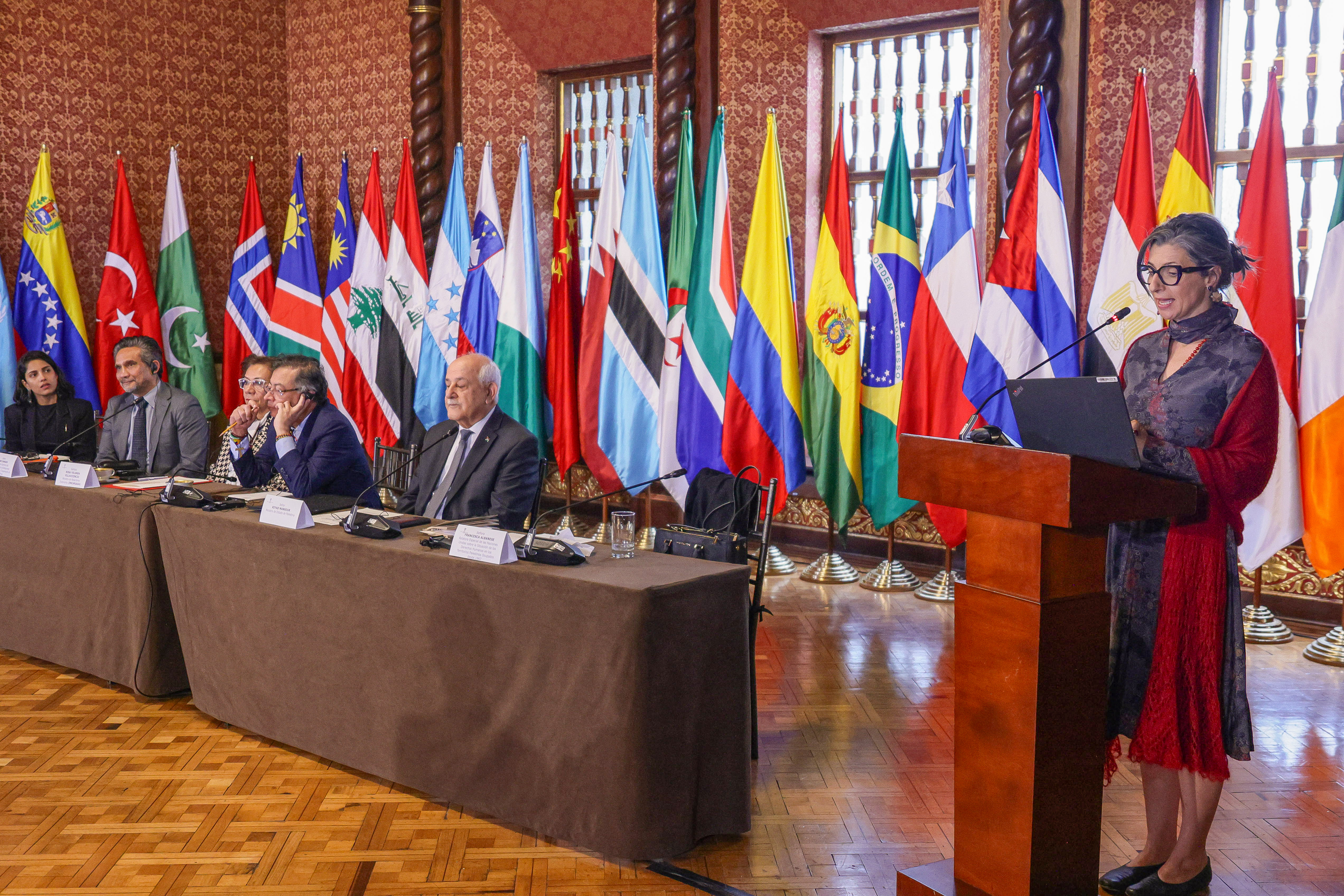
Albanese, Palestinian diplomat Riyad Mansour, and Colombian President Gustavo Petro at the Emergency Conference on Palestine in Bogota, Colombia, 16 July 2025

During a briefing on the international legal responsibilities for preventing genocide, Albanese said that given the way Israel was behaving, it was time to consider suspending their credential as a member state under Article 6 of the UN Charter. In an interview with Middle East Eye in November 2024, Albanese described Foreign Secretary of the United Kingdom David Lammy as a genocide denier, and stated that the British government had done nothing to prevent Israel's atrocities in Gaza. In March 2025, Betar, a Jewish far-right organization, threatened Albanese with a pager attack during her visit to London. The group posted a statement on Twitter that said "Join us to give Francesca a [pager emoji] in London on Tuesday." The pager emoji is a reference to the 2024 pager attacks in Lebanon. Albanese said that she and her family had received death threats.

Albanese criticized the Trump administration for welcoming Israeli Prime Minister Benjamin Netanyahu to the United States and maintaining friendly relations with him, despite the fact that an arrest warrant has been issued for Netanyahu as part of the ICC investigation in Palestine. In June 2025, Albanese said Israel had killed more than 200 Palestinian journalists because they were documenting the genocide of Palestinians in Gaza. She also said EU officials like Ursula von der Leyen and Kaja Kallas were complicit in Israeli war crimes in the Gaza war.

The UN published "From Economy of Occupation to Economy of a Genocide" in June 2025. The report by Albanese stated that corporate entities were enabling and profiting from the occupation of Palestinian territories and the Gaza genocide. It listed 48 corporations, including Microsoft, Alphabet Inc., and Amazon, which it said are helping Israel displace Palestinians in breach of international law. Additionally, the report advocated for sanctions against Israel and prosecution of the accused companies by the ICC.

=== Sanctions imposed by the United States ===
Six days after "From Economy of Occupation to Economy of a Genocide" was released, in July 2025, the United States Department of the Treasury under the Trump administration imposed sanctions on Albanese under Executive Order 14203. She was named a "specially designated national", thus forbidding all US persons and companies from doing business with her, except as necessary to the wind down of any transaction involving Albanese until 8 August 2025. The US Secretary of State Marco Rubio was quoted as saying: "Albanese's campaign of political and economic warfare against the United States and Israel will no longer be tolerated". As a result of the sanctions, she lost access to credit cards and bank accounts in most countries and is barred from traveling to the US. Georgetown University stated in December 2025 that Albanese was no longer an affiliate scholar in compliance with the sanctions.

She is the first UN official to be designated on the list, which includes Al-Qaeda members, drug traffickers, and arms dealers. According to Reuters, the sanctions are part of the Trump administration's larger attacks on international institutions, including the sanctioning of more than nine ICC judges and cuts to foreign aid. According to Associated Press, the sanctions are an example of the US government's attempts to suppress anti-Israel criticism during the Gaza war.

The sanctions were criticised by the UN, Belgium foreign minister Maxime Prévot, and Spain prime minister Pedro Sánchez. Albanese called the sanctions "obscene" and said that she was being punished for her "pursuit of justice". The move was criticised by Amnesty International as a "disgraceful affront to international justice". Human rights activist Kenneth Roth said the Trump administration was trying to censor Albanese to protect Israel. Margaret Satterthwaite, the U.N. special rapporteur on the independence of judges and lawyers, expressed concern that "someone’s human rights work could be seen as so dangerous that they would be thought of as akin to a terrorist". The editorial board of The Wall Street Journal praised the move as overdue.

Albanese's family filed a lawsuit against Trump over the sanctions in February 2026. In May 2026, US district judge Richard J. Leon blocked the sanctions against Albanese, ruling that they violated Albanese's First Amendment rights. Later that month, after the D.C. Court of Appeals granted an administrative stay of Leon's order, noting that the decision was not "a ruling on the merits" of the Trump administration's appeal. The sanctions were reinstated.

=== Edited video of Al Jazeera address ===
In February 2026 a video was produced by the pro-Israel advocacy group UN Watch, in which portions of an address by Albanese, at an Al Jazeera forum, were edited and spliced together to suggest that Albanese had said that Israel was the "common enemy" of humanity. Albanese did not make the fabricated statement but rather criticized Western inaction during the Gaza genocide.

In response to the purported remarks, the foreign ministers of the Czech Republic, Germany, and France called for the removal of Albanese. Albanese responded that she was referring to "the system that has enabled the genocide in Palestine" as the "common enemy". The French Foreign Minister Jean-Noël Barrot said France "unreservedly condemns the outrageous and reprehensible remarks" attributed to Albanese, arguing that they were directed not at the Israeli government, whose policies may be criticized, but "at Israel as a people and as a nation". Barrot also accused Albanese of adding to "a long list of scandalous positions", alleging that she is a political activist who has previously justified the 7 October attacks and "compared Israel to the Third Reich". Although Barrot said France would call for Albanese's resignation at a 25 February meeting of the UN Human Rights Council, it ultimately did not do so.

German Foreign Minister Johann Wadephul described her position as "untenable". Petr Macinka, the foreign minister of the Czech Republic, citing the "common enemy of humanity" remarks, also urged her to step down. Italian Foreign Minister Antonio Tajani also condemned her conduct and positions, writing that they "do not reflect those of the Italian government". Austria's Foreign Minister, Beate Meinl-Reisinger, posted a tweet condemning Albanese for using language that "undermines the impartiality and highest standards that the role of a UN representative requires", but later deleted that post without explanation.

Several lawmakers likewise urged that Albanese be stripped of her UN mandate with immediate effect, citing the ostensible comments – that Albanese did not make – from the edited video of the conference. Amnesty International condemned the attacks on Albanese for being based on a deliberately truncated video, and called on the ministers who attacked her to apologize and retract the calls for Albanese's resignation. Over 100 artists, including Mark Ruffalo, Javier Bardem, Annie Ernaux and Annie Lennox, signed an open letter supporting Albanese.

Albanese's comments were reviewed by a United Nations panel of human rights experts. The panel found that the "vicious attacks" on Albanese were based on a doctored video of her speech. It criticised the "Ministers of certain States [who] rely on manufactured facts and criticise Ms Albanese for statements that she never made". It said that, instead of attacking Albanese, the Ministers "should join forces to hold accountable, including before the International Criminal Court, leaders and officials accused of committing war crimes and crimes against humanity in Gaza".

== Writing ==
=== "Anatomy of a Genocide" (2024) ===
In her report "Anatomy of a Genocide", Albanese found reasonable grounds to believe that Israel is intentionally committing at least three genocidal acts proscribed in the Genocide Convention against the Palestinians as a group in Gaza. These acts are: Killing members of the group, Causing serious bodily or mental harm to members of the group, and Deliberately inflicting on the group conditions of life calculated to bring about its physical destruction in whole or in part. To support her argument, Albanese stated that the Israeli military has killed mostly women and children and that they have killed men without proving that they are combatants. She stated that Israel has imprisoned and tortured tens of thousands of Palestinian men and boys and has demolished hospitals, farmland, and other necessary facilities. She cited statements made by Israeli officials as evidence of Israeli incitement to commit genocide. Albanese called for sanctions and an arms embargo against Israel. Additionally, she condemned war crimes committed by Palestinian groups in the October 7 attacks and called for the release of the Israeli hostages.

=== When the World Sleeps (2025) ===
In 2025, Albanese published Quando il mondo dorme: Storie, parole e ferite della Palestina [When the World Sleeps: Words and Wounds of Palestine] in Italy where it became a bestseller. As of April 2026, it has been translated into 11 languages. In addition to autobiographical content, the book covers the stories of people who have influenced Albanese, including Gabor Maté, Ghassan Abu-Sittah, and Hind Rajab. One chapter is about Alon Confino, an Italian-Israeli professor who worked with Albanese and supported her against accusations of antisemitism.

== Reception ==
=== Accusations of antisemitism and anti-Israel bias ===
In February 2023, 18 members of the United States Congress called for Albanese to be removed from her position saying that she has demonstrated a consistent bias against Israel.

In July 2024, Albanese expressed support on X for a post by former UN human rights official Craig Mokhiber, that juxtaposed a photo of a crowd welcoming Adolf Hitler with Nazi salutes and a photo of Netanyahu being welcomed by the US Congress. Mokhiber captioned his post with the words "History is always watching" and Albanese responded with "This is precisely what I was thinking today". In response, US Ambassador to the UN Linda Thomas-Greenfield stated, "It is clear [Albanese] is not fit for this or any position at the UN." Albanese said the comparison she and Mokhiber were making was between two crowds of politicians cheering on war criminals. German Newspaper Der Freitag stated that both past comments on the "Jewish lobby" and this statement crossed the line from legitimate criticism into antisemitic tropes.

Responding to two reports presented to the United nations in October 2024, the World Jewish Congress accused Albanese of repeatedly engaging in Holocaust inversion by drawing comparisons between Israel and Nazi Germany, calling her statements "not only deeply offensive, but a gross distortion of history". Albanese said in response to the accusation of antisemitism, "Antisemitism and discrimination against Jews as Jews is gross. But frankly I couldn't care less if Israel were run by Jews, Muslims, Christians or atheists... All I want is for Israel to conduct itself in line with international law."

On 11 February 2025, the Dutch House of Representatives cancelled an invitation for Albanese to visit on 13 February, on account of her statements about the Gaza War. On 20 June 2025, the Trump administration sent a letter to the UN Secretary-General Antonio Guterres, calling for her removal as rapporteur on Palestinian rights following what they alleged was "antisemitism and support for terrorism".

=== Support for Albanese ===
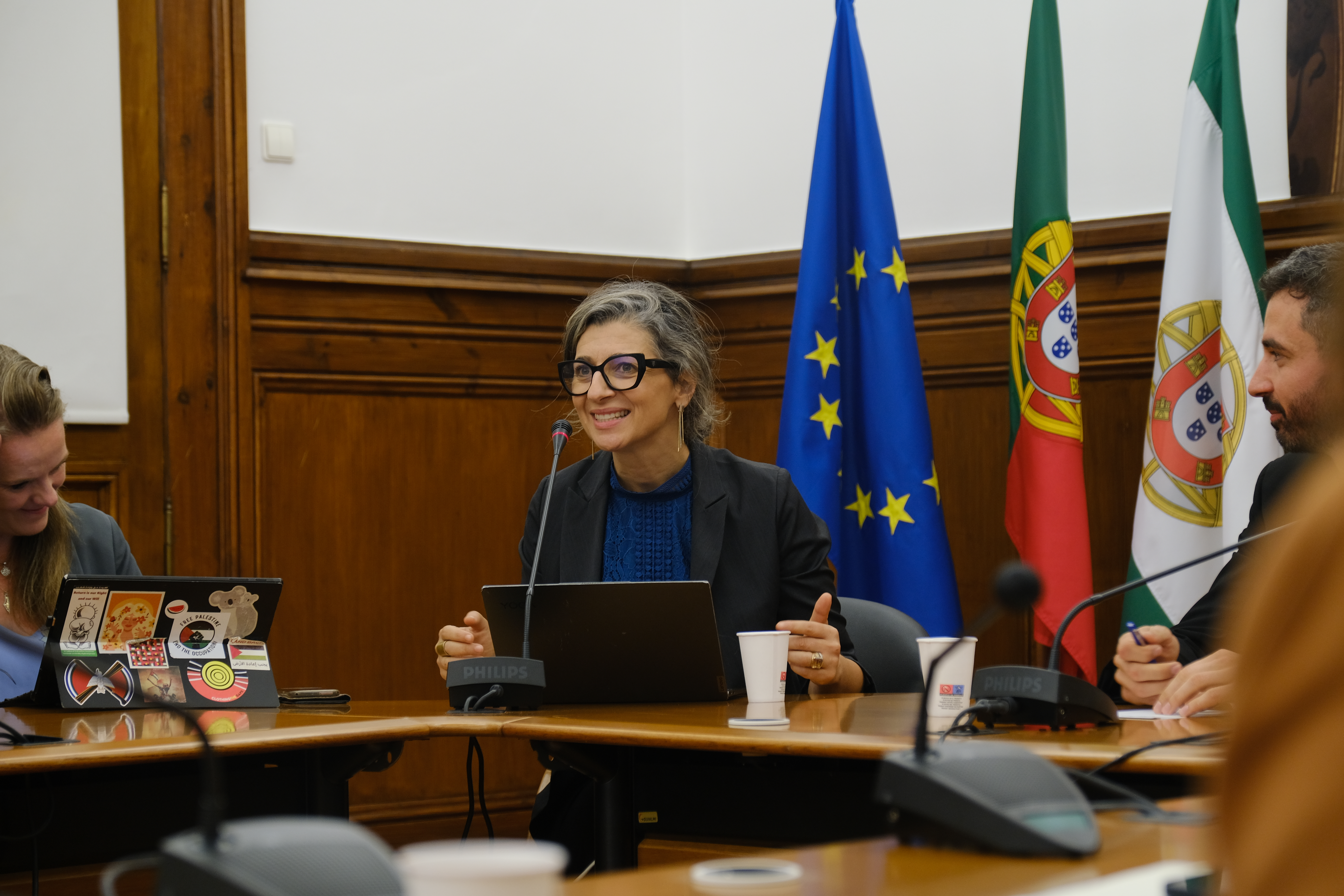
Albanese with members of the Portuguese Parliament on 27 July 2024

In December 2022, sixty-five scholars of antisemitism, the Holocaust, and Jewish studies issued a statement saying that criticism of Albanese was motivated by a desire to censor her rather than to end antisemitism. In January 2023, a statement was issued in defence of Albanese by 116 human rights organizations, academic institutions, and other civil society organizations. The statement condemned criticism of Albanese as a "smear campaign" aiming at censoring criticism of Israel.

Amid continuing efforts to have Albanese removed from her post, Amnesty International Italy published on 26 April 2023 a letter of support signed by dozens of Italian rights groups, MPs, jurists, and academics. On 27 April, three former holders of the position (John Dugard, Richard Falk, and Michael Lynk) publicly urged the UN to defend Albanese and said that she has been "the target of attacks that have been 'slanderous' and 'personal'". On 3 May, Albanese tweeted that she "saw too many deaths [of Palestinians], too much arbitrariness, zero accountability" and faced accusations for her work in addressing these abuses.

In 2025, there were calls to nominate Albanese for the Nobel Peace Prize. A campaign on Avaaz to award her with the Prize reached over 400,000 signatures. Albanese was nominated for the Nobel Peace Prize by Aodhán Ó Ríordáin, an Irish member of the EU Parliament; Matjaž Nemec, a Slovenian politician; the Tunisian National Dialogue Quartet; and the Canadian New Democratic Party (NDP) has voiced their intention to do so. At a 2025 meeting of the UN Human Rights Council, she was met with solidarity from the Global South member states for her activities. She was also voted in to keep her position as UN Special Rapporteur on human rights in the occupied Palestinian territories until 2028. Florence considered granting Albanese honorary citizenship to recognise her support for Palestine. The vote was shelved after members of the governing majority said there were insufficient votes to approve the measure, following opposition from Mayor Sara Funaro.

== Awards ==
In April 2023, Albanese received the International Stefano Chiarini Award (Italian: Premio Internazionale Stefano Chiarini) in recognition of her journalistic work covering Palestine and the Middle East.

She was chosen as the Passblue UN Person of the Year for 2024. Passblue said Albanese and the other nominees "demonstrated strong leadership in 2024 to uphold the UN Charter, advocate for universal human rights, act to ensure international humanitarian law and promote peace and nonviolence throughout the world".

On 12 February 2025, Albanese received the Dutch "Dries van Agt Prize" from The Rights Forum, which honors individuals and organizations that make a strong commitment to human rights and international law in Palestine. In March 2025, the Islamic Republic News Agency reported that Albanese received the Iranian "Dr. Taghi Ebtekar Award" for her work on the humanitarian situation in Gaza and her outstanding documentation and reporting of the abuses taking place there. On 2 April 2026, Albanese received a joint honorary doctorate from three Flemish universities: the University of Antwerp, Ghent University and Vrije Universiteit Brussel.

On 7 May 2026, Spain prime minister Pedro Sánchez awarded Albanese the Order of Civil Merit, one of the country's highest civilian honors, for her "extensive work in documenting and denouncing violations of international law in Gaza".

== Personal life ==
Albanese married Massimiliano Calì, a World Bank official, and they have two children. As of 2025, she lives in Tunis, Tunisia.

== Bibliography ==
- When the World Sleeps: Words and Wounds of Palestine. South Yarra, Victoria: Hardie Grant Books, 2026
- A Moon Will Rise from the Darkness: Reports on Israel's Genocide in Palestine. London: Pluto Press, 2025
- Quando il mondo dormo: storie, parole e ferite della Palestina. (12th ed) Milano: Rizzoli, 2025.
- J'accuse. Milano: Fuoriscena, 2024.
- Palestinian refugees in international law. Oxford: Oxford University Press, 2020

== See also ==
- Navi Pillay
