= Rydbeck =

Rydbeck is a surname. Notable people with the surname include:

- Olof Rydbeck (1913–1995), Swedish diplomat
- Whitney Rydbeck (1945–2024), American actor
