= Bogotá conference =

2025 summit on the Gaza war

Emergency Conference on Palestine: Bogotá conference; Bogotá summit; Bogotá meeting
- 15–16 July 2025
- Countries that attended the Bogotá conference Countries that attended the Bogotá conference and agreed to the six measures proposed at it
- Host country: Colombia
- City: Bogotá
- Venue: San Carlos Palace
- Participants: 32 states: Algeria; Bolivia; Botswana; Brazil; Chile; China; Colombia; Cuba; Djibouti; Honduras; Indonesia; Iraq; Ireland; Lebanon; Libya; Malaysia; Mexico; Namibia; Nicaragua; Norway; Oman; Pakistan; Palestine; Portugal; Qatar; Saint Vincent and the Grenadines; Slovenia; South Africa; Spain; Turkey; Uruguay; Venezuela; 5 UN attendees: Francesca Albanese; Philippe Lazzarini; Tlaleng Mofokeng; Laura Nyirinkindi; Andres Macias; Other non-state attendees
- President: Gustavo Petro
- Secretary: Varsha Gandikota-Nellutla
- Website: thehaguegroup.org/meetings-bogota-en/

Key points

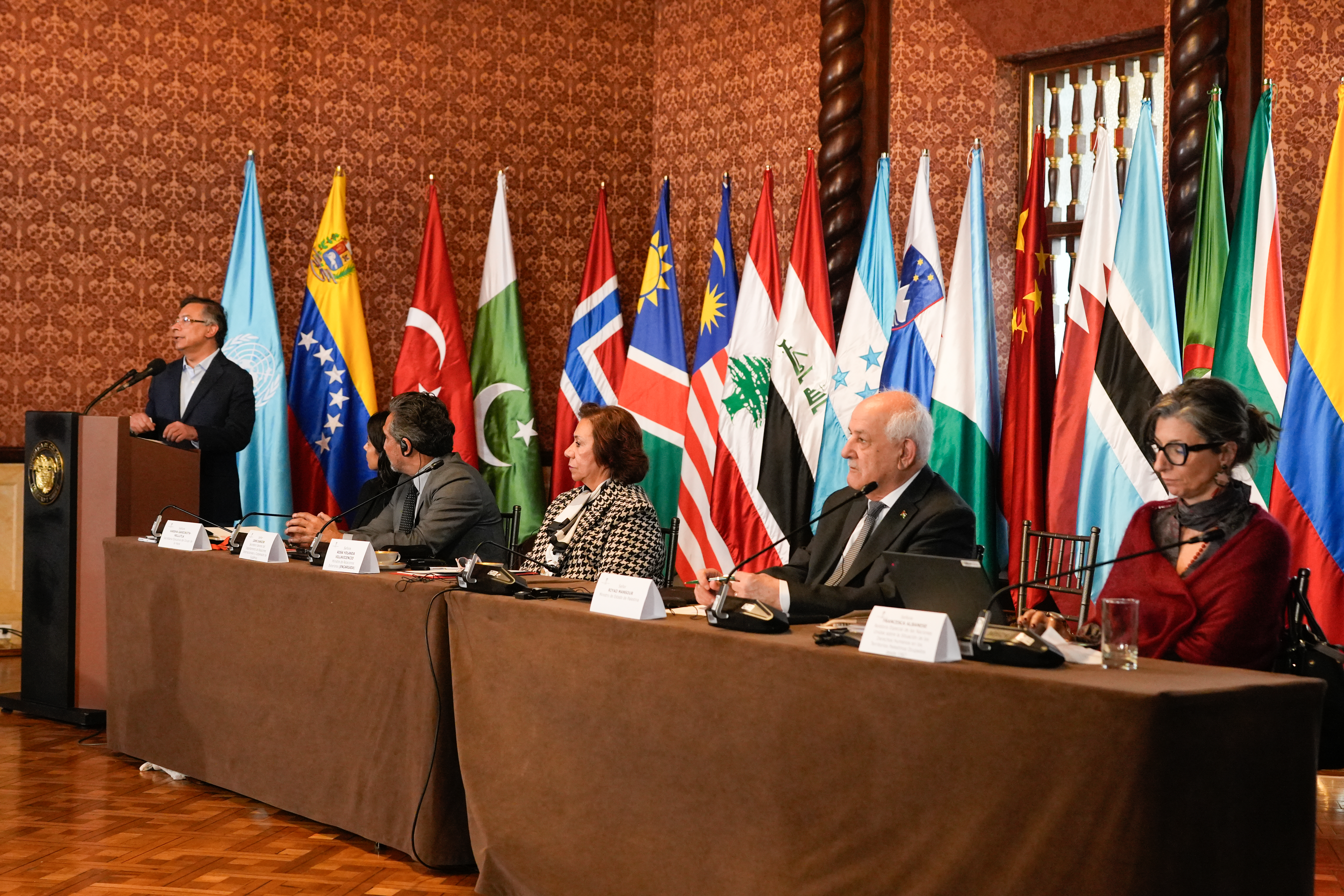
President of Colombia Gustavo Petro (left) speaks at the end of the Bogotá summit, 16 July 2025; also pictured (left to right): Varsha Gandikota-Nellutla (Executive Secretary of the Hague Group), Zane Dangor (Director-General of the Department of International Relations and Cooperation of South Africa), Rosa Villavicencio (Minister of Foreign Affairs of Colombia), Riyad Mansour (Permanent Observer of Palestine to the UN) and Francesca Albanese (UN Special Rapporteur on the occupied Palestinian territories)

The Emergency Conference on Palestine, more commonly referred to as the Bogotá conference, (Note: Attributed to multiple sources:) Bogotá summit, (Note: Attributed to multiple sources:) or Bogotá meeting, (Note: Attributed to multiple sources:) was a meeting of 32 countries held by the Hague Group in Bogotá, Colombia, on 15–16 July 2025. At the meeting, 12 of the attendees agreed to several measures intended to stop the genocidal acts committed by Israel during the Gaza war. (Note: Turkey also agreed to the measures after the summit, bringing the total number of countries agreeing to the measures to 13.) It was hosted by Colombian president Gustavo Petro, and took place at the San Carlos Palace. Israel's mission to the UN, as well as a spokesperson of the US State Department, both criticized the summit.

== Background ==
The Hague Group is a group of countries that was created in order to uphold and protect the rulings of the International Court of Justice (ICJ) and the International Criminal Court (ICC) relating to the Israeli–Palestinian conflict. The group was formed on 31 January 2025 by nine states from the Global South amid the Israeli offensive in Gaza.

Since the start of the war in October 2023, an increasing number of experts and human rights organisations (including a United Nations Special Committee, Amnesty International and Médecins Sans Frontières) have described Israel's warfare as consistent with genocide. In July 2025, amid weak international response, the Hague Group thus decided to convene an emergency meeting in order to counter Israeli escalations and halt the genocide; the Hague Group founders include South Africa, which in late 2023 formally accused Israel of genocide at the ICJ.

== Attendees ==
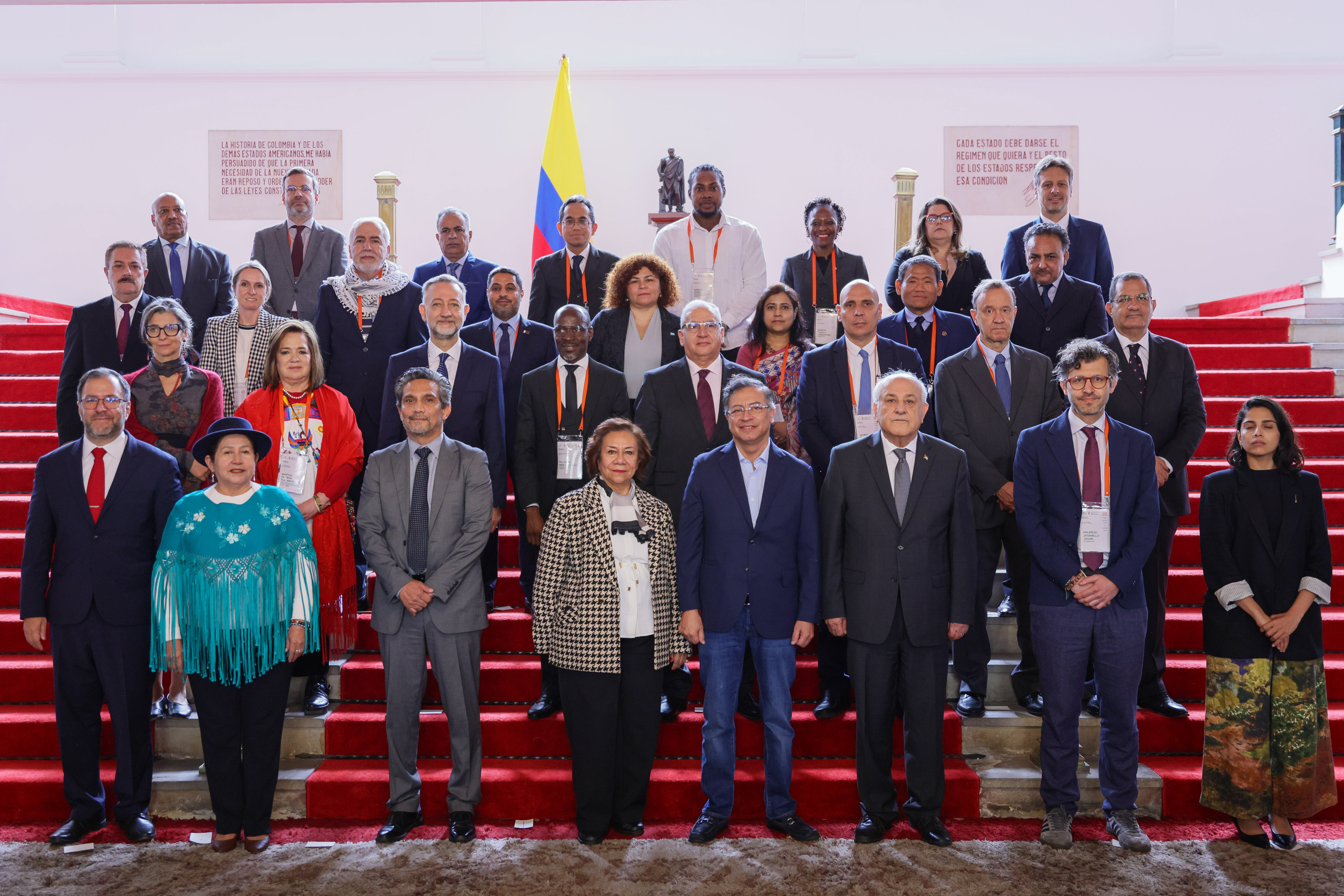
Group photo with the attending delegates

Nations whose representatives attended the summit include:

- Algeria
- Bolivia
- Botswana
- Brazil
- Chile
- China
- Colombia
- Cuba
- Djibouti
- Honduras
- Indonesia
- Iraq
- Ireland
- Lebanon
- Libya
- Malaysia
- Mexico
- Namibia
- Nicaragua
- Norway
- Oman
- Pakistan
- Palestine
- Portugal
- Qatar
- Saint Vincent and the Grenadines
- Slovenia
- South Africa
- Spain
- Turkey
- Uruguay
- Venezuela

Officials who attended included UN Special Rapporteur on the occupied Palestinian territories Francesca Albanese, UNRWA commissioner-general Philippe Lazzarini, UN Special Rapporteur on the Right to Health Tlaleng Mofokeng, chair of the UN Working Group on Discrimination against Women and Girls Laura Nyirinkindi, and member of the UN Working Group on Mercenaries Andres Macias. Palestinian-American trauma surgeon Thaer Ahmad spoke about his experiences treating patients in Gaza during the summit. Representatives from organizations such as the Hind Rajab Foundation also attended.

== Measures ==
Six measures against Israel were agreed to by 12 states at the summit. The measures are:

- stopping munitions, arms, fuel, military equipment, and dual-use technology from being sent or given to Israel;
- stopping ships that are at a high risk of being used to bring munitions, arms, fuel, military equipment, and dual-use technology to Israel from transiting, docking, or being maintained at ports;
- stopping munitions, arms, fuel, military equipment, and dual-use technology from being sent to Israel on ships bearing the flags of the states that agree to the measure, and guaranteeing liability for a lack of obedience with the measure;
- keep public money and institutions from supporting Israel's occupation of Palestine by examining public contracts;
- investigate and prosecute crimes under international law;
- support mandates of universal jurisdiction in order to ensure justice for Palestinian victims of international crimes.

== Results ==
In June 2025, shortly before the conference, Irish Foreign Affairs and Trade Minister Simon Harris introduced a proposal (the "Occupied Territories Bill") that would ban all trade with illegal Israeli settlements. The summit resulted in Bolivia, Colombia, Cuba, Indonesia, Iraq, Libya, Malaysia, Namibia, Nicaragua, Oman, Saint Vincent and the Grenadines, and South Africa signing the statement promising to implement the six proposed measures. Representatives of other countries at the summit stated that they were still considering their stance, and would provide commitments by 20 September 2025, shortly after the start of the 80th UN General Assembly.

On 29 July, Turkey was the first country to follow suit and adopt the six measures, later confirming the suspension of all trade and the closure of its airspace to Israel. On 31 July, while not expressedly as part of the measures proposed in Bogotá, Prime Minister Robert Golob of Slovenia announced a full arms embargo against Israel, making it the first European country to do so; on 6 August, Slovenia banned exports from Israeli-occupied territories and approved an aid package for Palestinians. Brazilian Foreign Minister Mauro Vieira announced a series of sanctions, which include continued suspension of arms trade, as well as the implementation of measures of support for Palestine within the UN framework. On 8 September 2025, Spanish prime minister Pedro Sánchez announced a bill to implement the closure of national ports and airspace to arms exports to Israel, additionally pledging a €10 million increase in funds for UNRWA activities in Gaza. One month later, the Parliament of Spain approved the bill, formalizing the arms embargo on Israel.

== Reactions ==
Ahead of the conference, a US State Department spokesperson accused the Hague Group of attempting to "weaponise international law to push radical anti-Western agendas" and "delegitimize Israel", warning that they would "aggressively defend" their interests; this was dismissed by participants. Former State Department official Annelle Sheline, who had resigned earlier in 2025 over the US administration's involvement in Gaza, said that the attending states were upholding "their obligations under the UN Convention on the Prevention and Punishment of the Crime of Genocide". The US had recently sanctioned UN Rapporteur and Bogotá meeting attendee Francesca Albanese because of her efforts to have the ICC prosecute Israeli and American officials and business leaders over Gaza.

South African Minister of International Relations and Cooperation Ronald Lamola described the event as "a collective affirmation that no state is above the law", saying "The Hague Group was born to advance international law in an era of impunity. The measures adopted in Bogotá show that we are serious – and that coordinated state action is possible." The Israeli mission to the United Nations said that the summit was a "moral travesty" in a statement. The World Jewish Congress said that the conference "will be nothing more than a long list of condemnations, rejections, appeals, and empty declarations, nothing that contributes to peace and coexistence between the two peoples."

== See also ==
- International law and the Arab–Israeli conflict
- International reactions to the Gaza war
- Palestinian genocide accusation
- Progressive International
