= Arms embargoes on Israel since 2023 =

Embargoes since October 2023

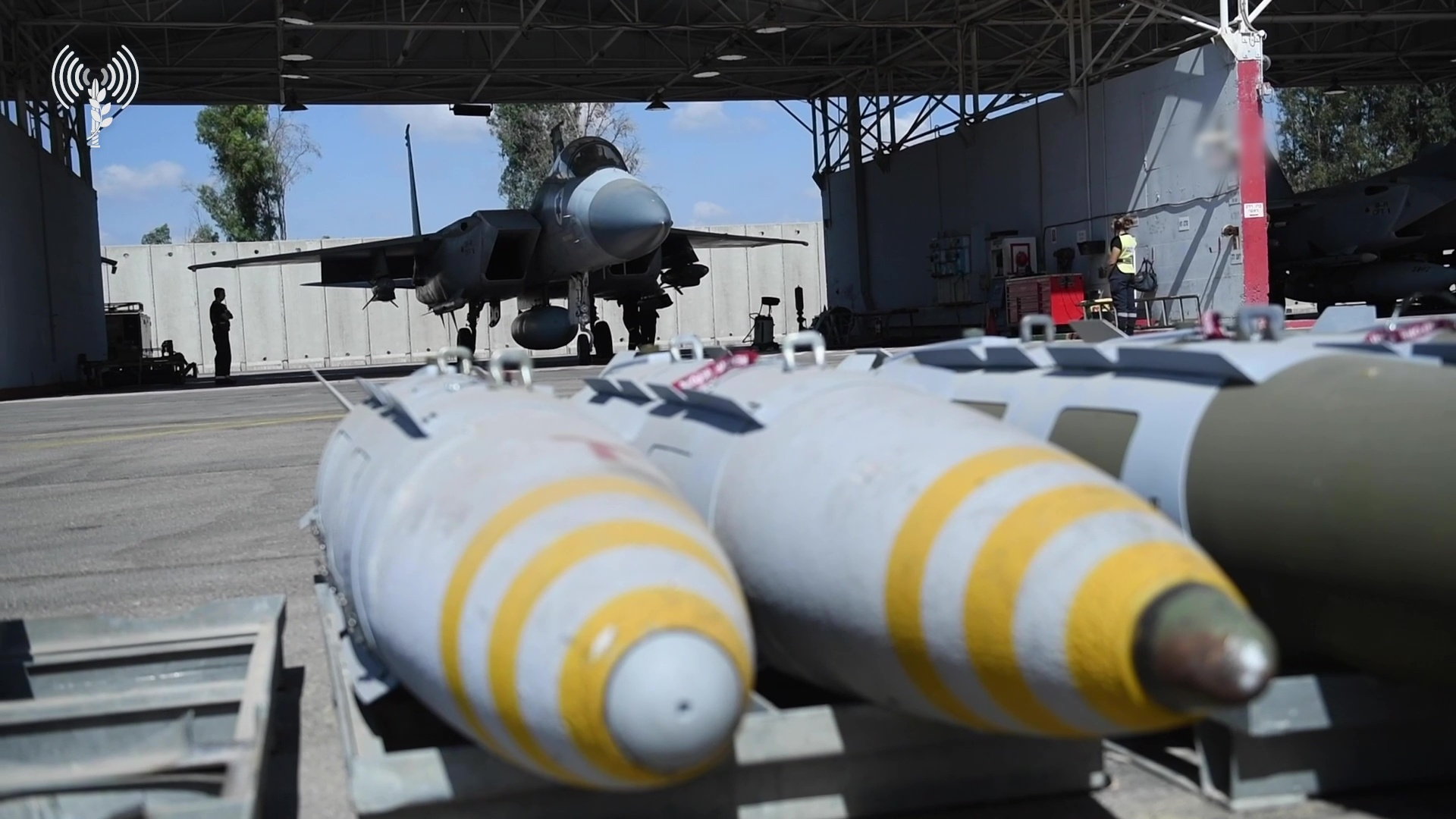
There have been political efforts to block or reduce the sale and transfer of certain principal armaments and ammunition to Israel, such as aerial bombs.

Since 7 October 2023, several countries such as Italy, Japan, Spain, Canada, the Netherlands and Belgium have ceased the sale of weapons to Israel. Key United States allies such as Britain have debated it. However, the US, as the major supplier of Israel's arms imports, keeps supplying weapons in spite of growing international condemnation of the mounting civilian casualties.

Campaign groups and some Western politicians insist that arms sales to Israel must stop because civilians have been killed during the Gaza war, Israeli atrocities and the humanitarian crisis in the Gaza Strip, and the Gaza genocide.

== Background ==
Israel is a major exporter of weapons, but its military has been heavily reliant on imported aircraft, guided bombs, and missiles to execute an aerial campaign that is considered one of the most intense and damaging in recent history by experts. The US is a major arms supplier to its closest Middle Eastern ally, and Germany is second. The bulk of Israel's military needs have been supplied by the United States, including bombs that weigh 2,000 pounds and can blow up bunkers. An additional $14 billion in military aid package for Israel was approved by the United States Congress in 2024.

Israel is being pressured by the international legal community for its war in Gaza, due to the dire humanitarian consequences that civilians face, and allegations that Israel's conduct is genocidal. Israel's prime minister may face arrest warrants for war crimes charges after the International Criminal Court's chief prosecutor made announcing it in June 2024. Israel also was ordered by the International Court of Justice (ICJ) in late January 2024 to take interim steps to prevent acts of genocide and to enable more aid to reach the Gaza Strip, but the orders have been ignored by the Israeli government. An advisory opinion was issued by the highest court of the United Nations on 19 July 2024, saying Israel is not allowed to occupy the Gaza Strip and West Bank, including East Jerusalem: "The Court has finally reaffirmed a principle that seemed unclear, even to the United Nations: Freedom from foreign military occupation, racial segregation and apartheid is absolutely non-negotiable." Soldiers involved in suspected war crimes have been actively supported by extremists, such as Itamar Ben-Gvir, the former national security minister.

Pressure on Israel's allies to cease arms deliveries increased following the attack on a convoy of World Central Kitchen in Gaza in early April 2024 that killed seven aid workers.

== Israel's main arms suppliers ==
Sixty-nine percent of Israel's total arms purchases come from US firms, with 30 percent coming from Germany and 0.9 percent coming from Italy. Defense imports from other countries make up 0.1% of the country's total. Israel has been supplied with most of its defense equipment that includes bombs that weigh 2,000 pounds by the United States.

In 2023, Germany's military exports were almost ten times higher than in 2022 after it extended sales to Israel in November 2023. Human Rights Watch reported that since 2015, the United Kingdom has given Israel military export licenses worth at least 474 million pounds ($594 million), tanks, ammunition, and components for the F-35 stealth strike fighter that was used in Gaza.

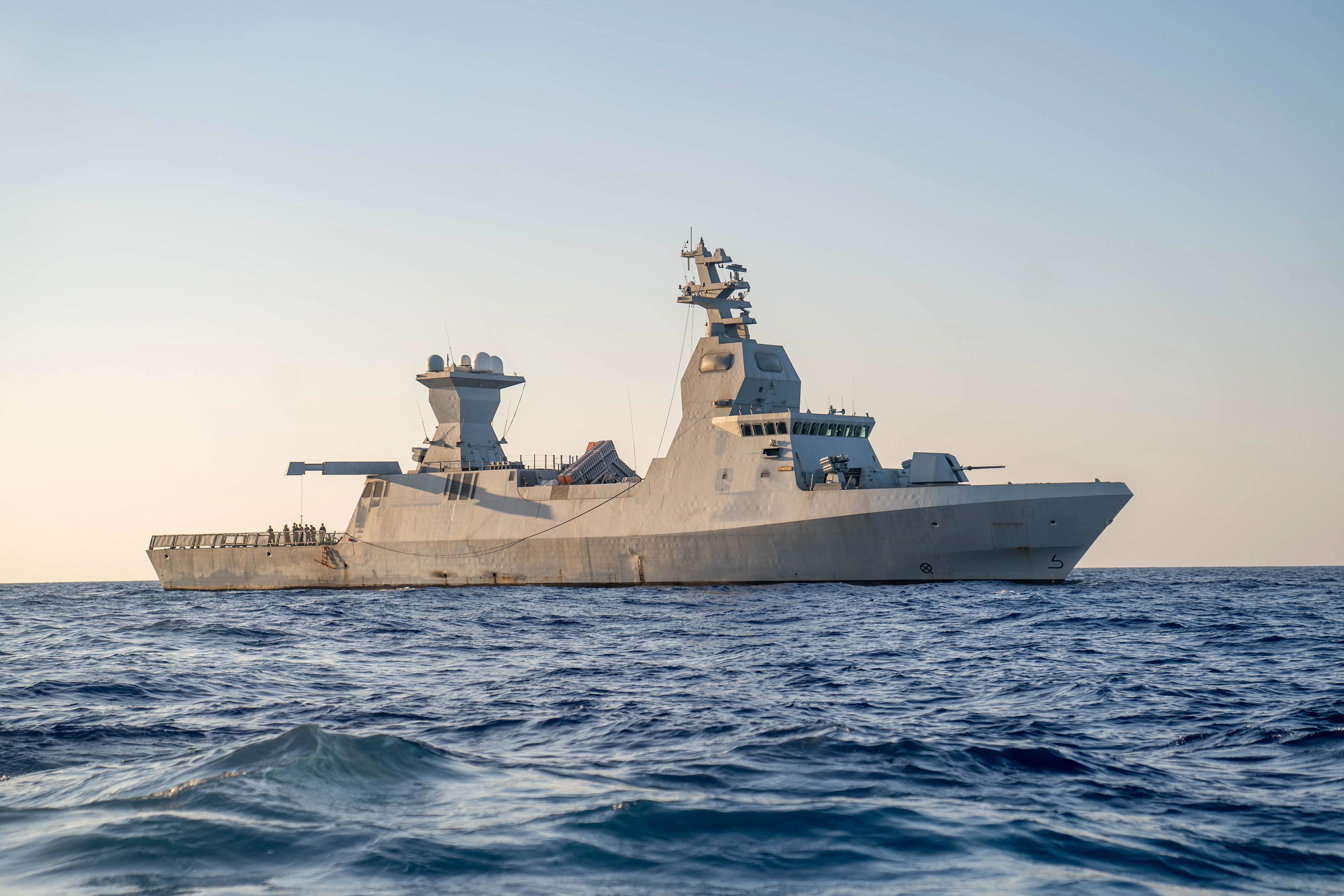
Sa'ar 6-class corvettes are major assets of the Israeli Navy, having their hulls built by Germany while the primary naval guns are provided by Italy. Both countries have imposed arms embargoes of different levels against Israel.

== Arms embargoes ==
In its interim ruling in South Africa's genocide case against Israel issued on 26 January 2024, the ICJ found that it is "plausible" that Israel is committing genocide in Gaza and ordered it to take all necessary actions to prevent acts that may constitute genocide towards Palestinians. This has prompted humanitarian organizations worldwide to press their governments to halt the trade of weapons and military assistance. Canada, Spain, Belgium, the Netherlands and Japan suspended arms sales as a result. A number of other nations have stated that they will stop buying Israeli weapons. In spite of the significant human loss and the Gaza Strip famine, a number of Western countries have continued to provide Israel with lethal weapons.

=== Australia ===
Minister for Foreign Affairs Penny Wong stated that the country has not given weapons to Israel since the start of the Gaza war. However, the defence spokesman for the Australian Greens party, David Shoebridge, has requested that the government be more transparent about the specific items that were exported to Israel, adding that the country has a system for exporting weapons that is one of the most secretive in the world. Amnesty International has urged Australia to halt the sale of arms to Israel and asserts that the country has granted approval for 322 defense exports to Israel for the past six years.

=== Belgium ===
Following the beginning of Israel's military campaign in Gaza in October 2023, Belgian authorities progressively tightened restrictions on military trade with Israel. Because arms-export competence is regionalised, however, the initial measures did not constitute a single nationwide embargo governing every possible movement of military goods.

In February 2024, following the ICJ ruling, Wallonia began suspending arms export licences to Israel, citing the "unacceptable deterioration of the humanitarian situation in the Gaza Strip" as well as the ICJ ruling ordering Israel to avoid genocide in Gaza. In May 2024, Wallonia issued a ban on all transits through its territory of military materiel to Israel.

However, Belgium's fragmented constitutional structure created distinctions and inconsistencies in the treatment of exports, transits, technical stops and overflights. Regional governments could control or refuse licences for transactions falling within their arms-trade jurisdiction, while aircraft carrying military equipment from one foreign country to Israel could potentially cross Belgian national airspace or carry out a technical stopover without the shipment constituting an export from Belgium or a transit requiring a regional licence. The federal government moved towards closing this gap in September 2025 and agreed a package of measures concerning Israel and the Occupied Palestinian Territory, strengthening restrictions on arms exports and instructing the Foreign Minister, for as long as the war continued, to refuse requests from the Israeli authorities for military flights to overfly Belgian airspace.

This decree covered “requests for overflight made by the Israeli authorities for military flights”, but did not address the broader category of civilian commercial cargo aircraft carrying military equipment to Israel, and in January 2026, the federal government subsequently announced a substantially broader and more explicit prohibition. The Royal Decree of 18 January 2026, published in the Belgian Official Gazette on 22 January and entering into force that day, prohibited both the overflight of Belgian territory and technical stops in Belgium by aircraft carrying specified military material destined for Israel or the Occupied Palestinian Territory.

For the purposes of the Decree, "military material" is defined by reference to the Common Military List of the European Union. An "overflight" is defined as a flight over Belgian territory by an aircraft which has taken off from a foreign state and whose next stop and/or final destination is a third country. A "technical stop" is similarly defined as a stop in Belgium by an aircraft arriving from abroad and continuing to a third country, where the stop does not constitute transit, export or re-export for customs-law purposes.

Article 2 provides that an aircraft may not overfly Belgian territory where its cargo contains military material which would “reinforce the military capabilities of the forces involved” and the material is destined for Israel or the Occupied Palestinian Territory. Article 3 applies the equivalent prohibition to technical stops. Importantly, the prohibition applies even where the transport had already received the necessary Belgian or foreign authorisations before the Decree entered into force.

The Decree also creates an affirmative reporting obligation. Under Article 4, an airline – or any other person associated with the contemplated movement of military material – which knows, or has sufficient reason to presume, that a prohibited overflight or technical stop will take place must inform Belgium's Directorate-General for Air Transport as soon as it becomes aware of the circumstances. Failure to do so is itself subject to sanction. Breaches of the overflight and technical-stop prohibitions are likewise punishable under Belgium's 1937 aviation legislation.

=== Canada ===
Due to the military campaign in Gaza, Canada halted arms sales to Israel in March 2024, following a vote in the Canadian House of Commons that made reference to the ICJ's ruling. The pledge does not pertain to military export permits that were authorized before 8 January 2024. Israel Katz, the foreign minister of Israel, stated that "History will judge Canada's current action harshly", in response to Canada as one of the countries imposing sanctions against Israel. However, in August 2024, a batch of weapons for Israel approved by the United States government that month, worth US$20 billion, included a contract for munitions made by General Dynamics in Quebec.

=== Denmark ===
Denmark is currently dealing with a court case that may result in the government suspending exporting F-35 fighter jet components to the US, because Israel is the destination for the finished jets.

=== France ===
On 5 October 2024, President Emmanuel Macron called for a halt to arms deliveries to Israel, saying, "the priority is that we return to a political solution, that we stop delivering weapons to fight in Gaza," that avoiding an escalation in Lebanon was a "priority" and that "Lebanon cannot become a new Gaza", provoking an indignant diplomatic response from Benjamin Netanyahu. France is not a major arms supplier to Israel, but it is a key member of the European Union and a permanent member of the United Nations Security Council.

=== Germany ===
At the start of the Gaza war in October 2023, Germany gave Israel weapons worth 326 million euros, which was a tenfold increase compared to 2022. However, according to data provided by the Ministry of Economy in response to a parliamentary question, approvals have fallen in 2024, with only 14.5 million euros granted between January and 21 August. Of these, the war weapons category was only 32,449 euros. Israel's Shomrim Research Network confirmed this decrease. The German spokesman of the Ministry of Economy told the dpa news agency that there is no ban on the export of weapons to Israel, saying Germany makes decisions on arms exports on a case-by-case basis, taking into account humanitarian law. Germany is experiencing tension due to the Chancellery's support for Israel while the Greens-led economy and foreign ministries are increasingly expressing their criticism of the Netanyahu administration. Alexander Schwarz, an attorney at the European Center for Constitutional and Human Rights, which has filed five suits against Berlin, said that the significant drop in approvals for 2024 reflects a real, albeit possibly temporary, reluctance to supply arms to Israel.

In October 2024, the European Legal Support Center filed a petition in German court requesting that a 150-metric-ton shipment of military-grade explosives be blocked from being sent from Germany to Israel, as they could potentially be used for war crimes and crimes against humanity in the Gaza Strip.

In August 2025, Chancellor Friedrich Merz said "the German government will not authorize any exports of military equipment that could be used in the Gaza Strip until further notice". Friedrich Merz cited Israel's plan to seize Gaza City as the reason for the decision.

Following the "Gaza peace plan", Germany announced it would lift its restrictions.

=== Hague Group ===
During the Bogotá summit convened by the Hague Group in July 2025, 12 of the countries with representatives present (Bolivia, Colombia, Cuba, Indonesia, Iraq, Libya, Malaysia, Namibia, Nicaragua, Oman, Saint Vincent and the Grenadines, and South Africa) agreed to six measures aimed at stopping the Gaza genocide. The measures included stopping munitions, arms, fuel, military equipment, and dual-use technology from being sent or given to Israel; stopping ships that are at a high risk of being used to bring munitions, arms, fuel, military equipment, and dual-use technology to Israel from transiting, docking, or being maintained at ports; and stopping munitions, arms, fuel, military equipment, and dual-use technology from being sent to Israel on ships bearing the flags of the states that agree to the measure. Shortly after, Bogotá summit participant Turkey formally joined the other 12 countries in adopting the measures.

=== Italy ===
According to SIPRI, Italy is among Israel's top three armaments suppliers, along with the US and Germany, making up 1% of Israel's arms imports from 2019 to 2023. The sale of arms and ammunition to Israel amounted to €13.7 million last year, according to the magazine Altreconomia, which cited the Italian National Institute of Statistics (ISTAT). Italy's government offered assurances that it was honoring previous contracts and reviewed sales on a case-by-case basis in order to adhere to a law prohibiting sales of munitions to countries at war, or those accused of human rights violations. In October 2024, the Italian government announced that it had suspended all shipments of military equipment to Israel.

=== Japan ===
Following the Israeli invasion of the Gaza Strip, Japan suspended arms sales to Israel. The Japanese company Itochu Corporation announced in February 2024 that its partnership with Elbit Systems, an Israeli weapons manufacturer, would end by the end of February.

=== Netherlands ===
In 2024, the Netherlands ended arms shipments to Israel because of the fear that they may be used in violations of international humanitarian law by killing civilians and destroying residential areas in Gaza. In February 2024, a Dutch court imposed a ban on the Netherlands government from delivering parts for the F-35 fighter aircraft to Israel. This ruling was later partly vacated in cassation, but the state has not announced any intention to resume exports as of 2025. A Dutch ship was reported to have allegedly delivered weapons to the Israeli port of Haifa in the week of 16 March 2026.

=== United Kingdom ===
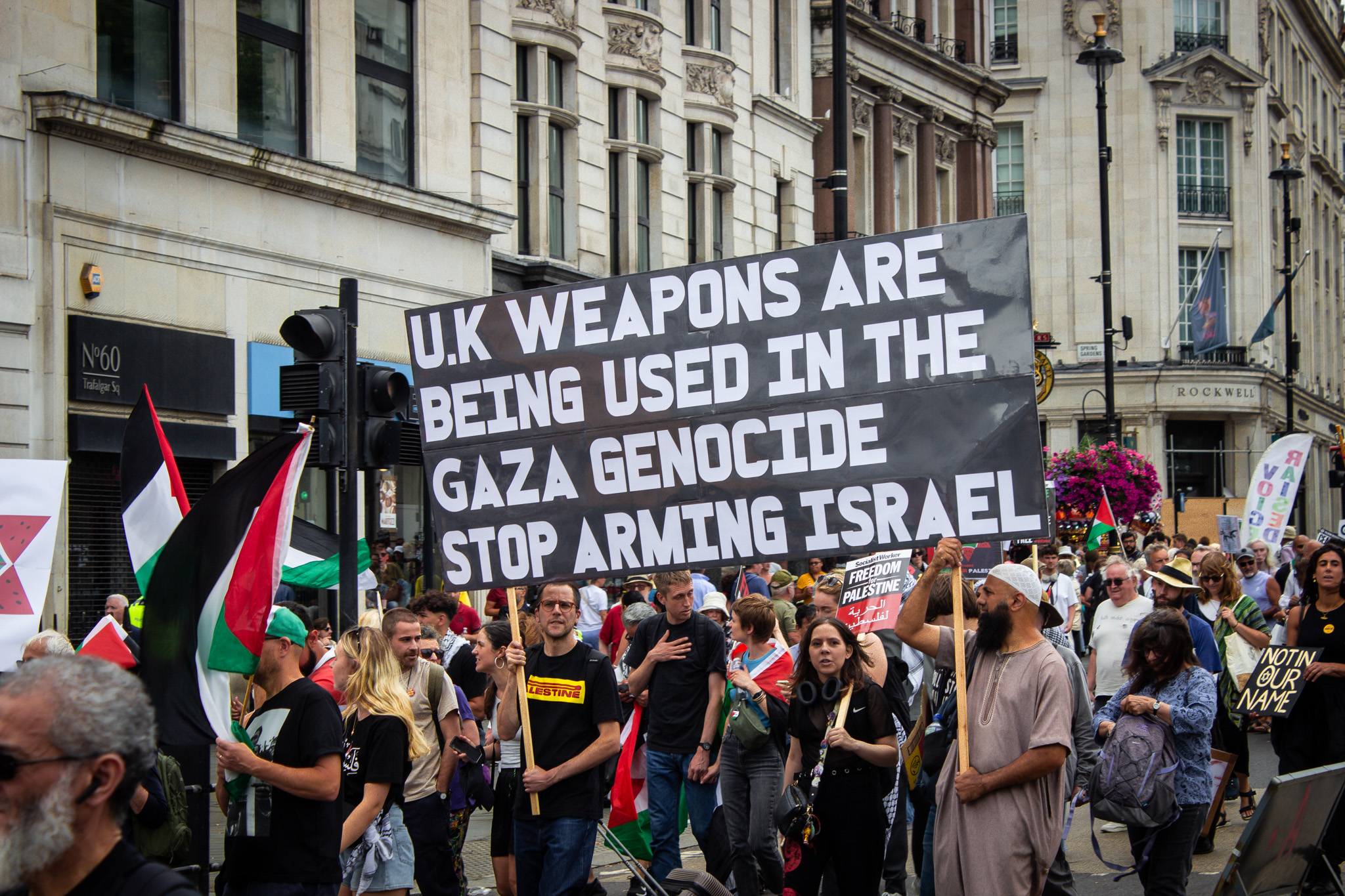
Pro-Palestinian protest at Trafalgar Square, 3 August 2024

When Britain's Labour Party took power after the country's 4 July election, it pledged to change Britain's stance on Israel's ongoing war in Gaza. However, it has not fully committed to suspending arms sales to Israel. When asked by a Green Party lawmaker if he would take action to stop all UK arms exports to Israel, the country's foreign secretary David Lammy, replied in the negative, saying Israel needed to be able to acquire defensive weapons. A diplomat from the Foreign Office resigned due to the inaction and warned that the country could be involved in war crimes. The move, according to a July poll by YouGov, reflects wider public sentiment in the UK, where around 58% of Britons support ending arms sales to Israel during the Gaza war, compared to just 18% that are against it. An even higher proportion (78 percent) support an immediate ceasefire. An arms embargo could face complications due to Britain's position as a key manufacturer of parts for the F-35 fighter jets used by both Israeli and British air forces, which Israel has used in bombing raids on Gaza. According to The Times of Israel, Britain is a tier-one partner for the US-made fighter program and makes 15 percent of the jet's parts. The UK announced in early September 2024 that it would suspend 30 of its 350 arms export licenses with Israel because of the risk that such equipment could be used to commit severe violations of the rules of international humanitarian law however a study conducted has found that the UK has still been secretly sending munitions to Israel despite the suspension of these licenses.

Israel's refusal to allow visits by the International Committee of the Red Cross to the Sde Teiman detention camp, where Palestinian prisoners are detained, is partly responsible for Britain's increased readiness to impose an export ban. Lawyers representing the UK government went to Israel to emphasize Britain's position that it is against the Geneva Conventions to deny access to the Red Cross. According to Yediot Ahronoth, Israel received a warning from former foreign minister David Cameron that if access is denied repeatedly, Europe may impose an arms embargo.

In June 2025, Britain's High Court ruled that the British government's decision to allow the export of F-35 fighter jet parts to Israel is lawful.

=== United States ===
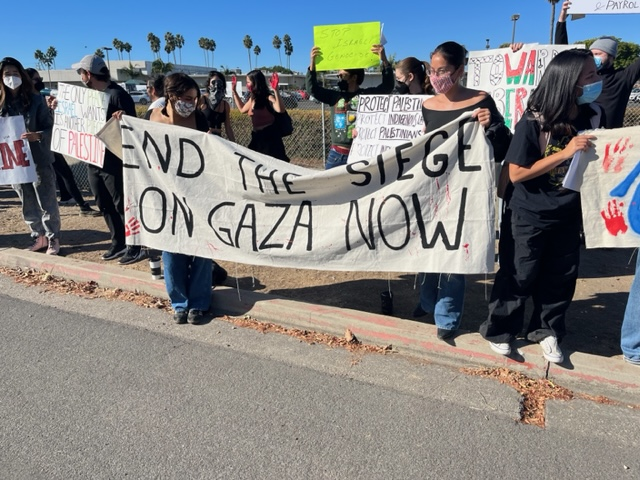
Demonstration outside Raytheon's office in Goleta, California to protest the military contractor's supply of weapons to Israel, 9 November 2023

President Joe Biden's administration temporarily halted then resumed sending some bombs to Israel in 2024 after US concerns about their use against civilians in Gaza. US officials said in mid-October 2024 that Israel must take steps within the next month to improve the humanitarian situation in Gaza, or face possible restrictions on US military aid. The European Union's foreign policy official has criticized the one-month deadline given by the US to Israel and said that many people will die during this time. Media studies professor Mohamed Elmasry interprets the one-month deadline as a distraction to cover up US complicity in genocide and help Vice President Kamala Harris win the election. State Department official Annelle Sheline, who resigned over US support for Israel, interpreted the deadline "as being intended to try to win over Uncommitted [National Movement] voters and others in swing states who have made clear that they are opposed to this administration’s unconditional support for Israel."

According to a Ynet News report published on 10 November 2024, amid growing disputes over the use of house demolitions in Gaza, the United States quietly halted the shipment of various weapons to the country, including 134 D9 bulldozers.

=== Slovenia ===
On July 30, 2025, The Slovenian government announced a complete ban on the import, export, and transit of arms and military equipment to and from Israel over its actions in the Gaza War. In June 2026, the newly appointed government of Slovenia reversed many of the measures its predecessor had placed on Israel, including this arms embargo.

=== Spain ===
On 8 September 2025, Prime Minister Sanchez announced that the government would formally impose a total weapons embargo on Israel over its conduct in the Gaza war.

On 8 October 2025, The Congress of Deputies voted 178–169 to ratify the arms embargo on Israel.

== Petitions to impose arms embargoes ==
=== United Nations Human Rights Council ===
A resolution was adopted by the United Nations Human Rights Council to hold Israel accountable for any possible war crimes and crimes against humanity committed in the Gaza Strip, and request a ban on all arms sales to the country. The resolution was passed with the support of 28 of the 47 member states of the council. Among the six countries that opposed it were the United States and Germany that supply 99 percent of weapons imported to Israel. France, Albania, and 11 other countries declined to participate.

=== Francesca Albanese ===
Francesca Albanese, the UN Special Rapporteur on the occupied Palestinian territories, gave a speech to the UN rights body in Geneva, delivering information on a report named "The Anatomy of Genocide." She held the view that Israel's military campaign in Gaza since 7 October was equivalent to genocide and urged nations to immediately enforce sanctions and an arms embargo to "prevent further violations of international humanitarian law and violations and abuses of human rights." Israel rejected the findings and condemned the resolution as "a stain for the Human Rights Council and for the UN as a whole". Albanese is one of the dozens of independent human rights experts who are obligated by the United Nations to report and advise on certain themes and crises.

=== Independent UN human rights experts ===
A group of 38 independent UN human rights experts appointed by the UN Human Rights Council in Geneva said that UN member states should comply with the ICJ's ruling on Israel's presence in the occupied Palestinian territories. They urged action to be taken, consisting of an arms embargo and targeted sanctions, along with investigations and prosecutions against those implicated in crimes in the Occupied Palestinian Territory, Specifically, individuals who are dual citizens and serve in the Israeli military or are involved in settler violence.

=== French demonstrators ===
A demonstration supporting Palestine took place in France on 7 February 2024, which called on French companies, such as Dassault Aviation, to refrain from selling arms to Israel. The Anadolu Agency reported that demonstrators stated that all French companies that provide arms to Israel are implicated in genocide.

=== UK campaigners ===
British campaigners have sent letters to the directors of 20 arms manufacturers located in the UK, stating that failing to stop war could result in criminal liability should Israel continue to receive military equipment from their companies. Four groups sent letters to directors of arms companies that provided parts or components for the F-35 fighter jets employed by Israel's air force during the bombardment of Gaza. The Global Legal Action Network also initiated legal action against the government's determination to keep selling weapons to Israel. According to the letter, the company directors could potentially be held responsible for atrocity crimes in Gaza, despite the fact the UK government has consistently granted permission to sell arms to Israel, since the beginning of the war. It refers to a section of the International Criminal Court Act 2001 that specifies that it is an offense against English and Welsh law to take part in "conduct ancillary" to commit a war crime or a crime against humanity in foreign countries.

=== British lawyers, academics, and retired judges ===
Leaked statements by a former official of the Ministry of Foreign Affairs and the Ministry of Defence, led government lawyers in Britain to advise that international law has been violated by Israel, and thus the UK must halt all sales of weapons to Israel immediately. Since Israel killed seven aid workers in the World Central Kitchen aid convoy attack, including three British nationals, those calls have increased, with three former High Court judges joining more than 600 members of the UK legal profession in signing a 17-page letter that pointed out that the UK is violating international law by keeping Israel armed. The signatories were Baroness Hale of Richmond, who was once the Supreme Court president, and Lord Jonathan Sumption and Lord Nicholas Wilson, who were former Supreme Court justices. In their letter, the British legal professionals stated that the UK has a legal obligation to take action against Israel, based on the January 2024 ruling by the International Court of Justice that Israel's military campaign in Gaza falls under the scope of the Genocide Convention, noting that the UK is obligated under the convention to "prevent and punish genocide."

=== US medics ===
A number of US physicians and nurses wrote a letter to President Joe Biden stating that the real number of deaths from Israel's prolonged attack is higher than the previous record, asking the US to stop providing diplomatic and military aid to Israel until a ceasefire is reached.

In July 2024, a group of medics sent an eight-page letter sent to Biden, the first lady, Jill Biden, and Kamala Harris, the vice-president, saying they observed evidence of a wide range of violations of US weapons laws and international humanitarian law. They wrote that they could not forget the "scenes of unbearable cruelty directed at women and children" they had witnessed. Many of the signatories had previously informed The Guardian that they believed that Israeli snipers were targeting kids, and that the impact of shrapnel-spraying weapons on civilians was devastating. According to the medics, who worked with the World Health Organization and other aid agencies, the actual death toll is significantly and the number of people killed is greater than the Palestinian Ministry of Health's figure of over 39,000, with the majority of them being women and children. The Bidens were directly appealed to by the medics: "We wish you could hear the cries and screams our consciences will not let us forget. We cannot believe that anyone would continue arming the country that is deliberately killing these children after seeing what we have seen."

In September 2024, a second group of nearly 100 American medics signed a letter to Biden and Harris calling for an arms embargo, writing, "President Biden and Vice President Harris, we are 99 American physicians and nurses who have witnessed crimes beyond comprehension. Crimes that we cannot believe you wish to continue supporting".

=== British people ===
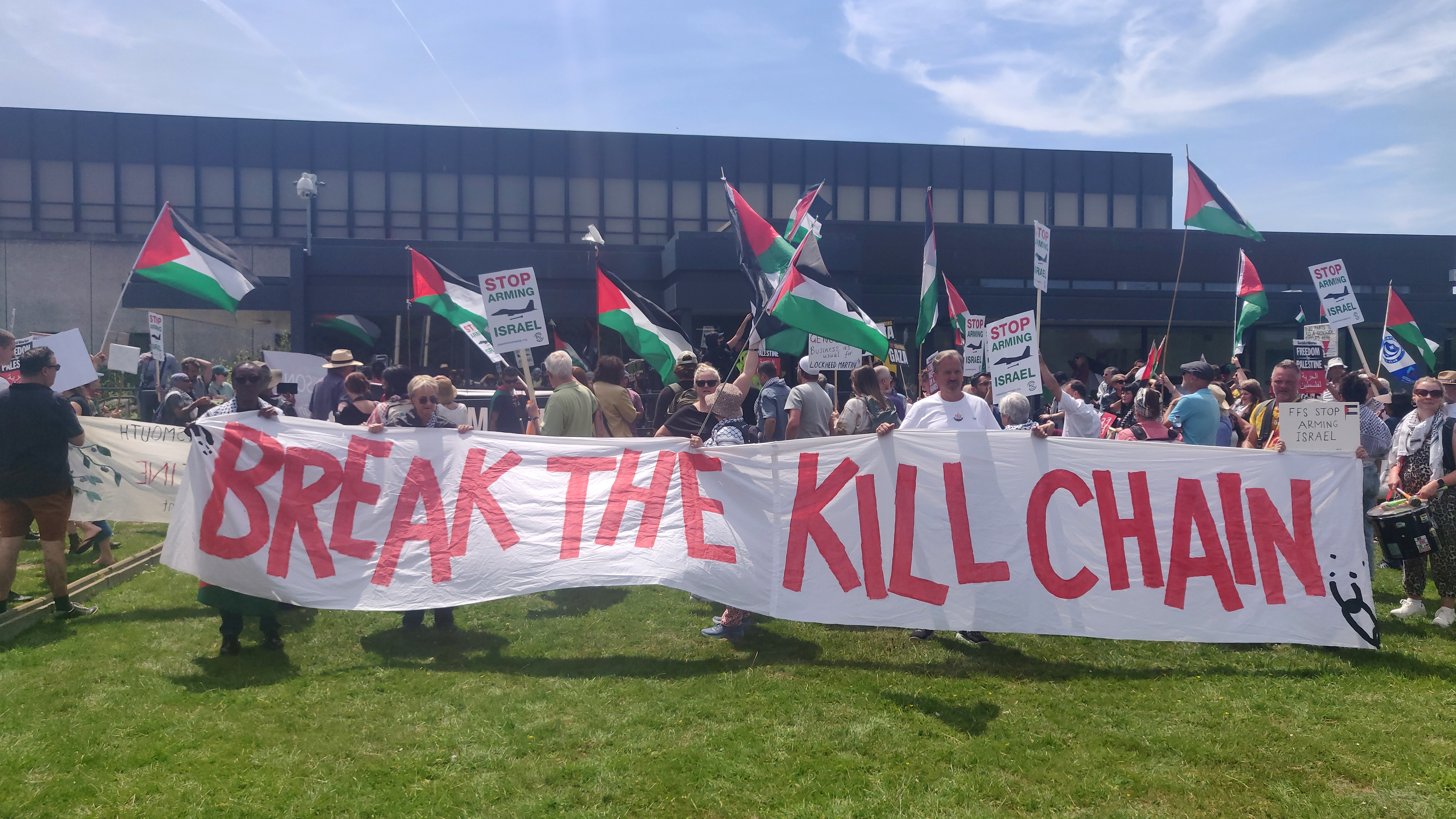
Protest at Lockheed Martin UK in Havant, England, 17 June 2025

According to a survey conducted in May 2024, more than 70 percent of British people support an immediate ceasefire in Gaza. According to the poll, 55 percent of people favor ending arms sales to Israel for the duration of the war, while 13 percent expressed their desire for a continuation. Forty percent of Conservative voters support the UK's decision to discontinue the sale of weapons, whereas only 24 percent are against it. Seventy-four percent of Labour Party voters support the UK halting deals, while only seven percent oppose the call.

=== Jewish Voice for Peace ===
The coordinated protest on 2 July 2024, organized by Jewish Voice for Peace, caught Congressional staffers and law enforcement agents off guard by the quickness of the event. The demonstration on Capitol Hill took place on a day prior to Israeli Prime Minister Benjamin Netanyahu's speech to Congress on the invitation of senior legislators from both major parties. Protesters gathered with red T-shirts with the slogan "Not in our name: Jews say stop to arming Israel" as they were seen between the archways of the Cannon Building. Progressive Jewish organizations have been holding protests across the country, including on roads, inside train stations, and at political offices.

=== 200 MPs from 12 countries ===
In response to mounting international pressure on Israel's actions in Gaza, more than 200 delegates from 12 countries have called for an arms embargo on Israel. In their letter, the politicians stated that "an arms embargo has moved beyond a moral necessity to become a legal requirement". "Providing arms to Israel despite the mounting evidence of grave abuses documented on the ground can make those states complicit in war crimes," said Omar Shakir, the director of Israel and Palestine at Human Rights Watch, who investigates human rights abuses in Israel, the West Bank, and Gaza. The UN investigator recommended that member states use sanctions and arms embargoes to make the Israeli leadership change their approach.

=== Uncommitted Movement ===
US Vice President Kamala Harris has made an effort to portray herself as sympathetic to civilians in Gaza, where Israeli operations have killed over 40,000 people and have been criticized for abuses like torture, saying after a meeting with Netanyahu, "We cannot allow ourselves to become numb to the suffering, and I will not be silent." However, an aide to Harris denied a claim that she had agreed to talk about imposing an arms embargo on Israel during a conversation with the Uncommitted National Movement that was established to oppose President Joe Biden's unwavering commitment to Israel's war. The Uncommitted Movement stated that it found hope in Vice President Harris for appearing open to a meeting on the arms embargo and that it was eager to continue engaging "because people we love are being killed with American bombs."

=== Artists4Ceasefire ===
Hollywood Celebrities have formed a group called Artists4Ceasefire and issued a call to action titled "Stop Weapons, Save Lives." Among the Hollywood stars advocating for a US arms embargo against Israel are Mahershala Ali, Cynthia Nixon, Mark Ruffalo and Ilana Glazer. "Our demand is simple - our elected leaders must enforce existing US and international humanitarian laws that prohibit the use of military assistance to commit grave human rights violations," said Ruffalo. Mahershala Ali urged for a cessation of "the mass destruction being perpetrated using US tax dollars," referring to US-sponsored and financed arms transfers. Artoits4Ceasefire's message was spread through collaborating with artist Shepard Fairey and multiple humanitarian organizations, including Oxfam America, ActionAid USA and the War Child charity.

=== Plaid Cymru ===
During their party conference on 6 October 2024, Plaid Cymru members called for a boycott of Israel. The party's Westminster MPs endorsed a motion that labeled Israel as an apartheid state and charged it with ethnic cleansing and war crimes. The plan states that the British government should "expel the Israeli ambassador," ban arms sales to Israel, and that all members of the bloc should support an "economic and cultural boycott."

=== Coalition for Canadian Accountability in Gaza news conference ===
In Ottawa on 6 November 2024, the Coalition for Canadian Accountability in Gaza discusses a recent court filing against Justice Minister Arif Virani. This action, led by the Legal Centre for Palestine and others, seeks to hold the Canadian government account for allegedly failing to uphold its international legal obligations as they relate to the ongoing violence in Gaza.

=== Progressive and Democratic U.S. senators ===
A resolution to halt the sale of tank shells to Israel, requested by prominent progressives and mainstream Democratic senators, failed by a vote of 79 to 18. While Republicans were united in their opposition to the measures, HuffPost reported that the Biden administration persuaded Democratic senators to vote against them.

== Views ==
Josep Borrell, the European Union's foreign policy chief, said that if US President Joe Biden was concerned over the civilian death toll in Gaza, he should supply fewer arms to Israel. Weapon sales and military aid are deemed to be complicit in genocide and in violation of international law, according to advocates. At least dozens of US officials have resigned in protest of the US government's war policies.

Critics state with conviction that Section 502 (B) of the US Foreign Assistance Act prohibits the country from sending aid to governments responsible for gross human rights violations. The act permits Congress to request information about the country's practices and to terminate security support based on information received. Sarah Leah Whitson, executive director of Democracy for the Arab World Now, said the law has never been implemented because it depends on the president's decision. The Leahy Law contains similar provisions that prohibit the Department of State or Department of Defense from providing funding to foreign entities that, based on "credible information," have committed human rights violations. But while this rule has been applied to many US allies, it has never been applied to Israel, in part because the volume of military assistance sent makes it impossible to check. Prior to the 2024 presidential election, American author and political analyst Josh Ruebner said Kamala Harris should commit to ending arms transfers to Israel, as US law requires her to do if elected president, taking into consideration that a freeze on arms shipments to Israel is supported by 62 percent of 2020 Biden voters with 14 percent opposed to it.

In response to the siege of North Gaza, Oxfam and 37 other major humanitarian organizations said all states "must halt now the transfer of all weapons, parts and ammunition that could be used to commit further violations of international humanitarian law." Human Rights Watch called for an arms embargo on Israel following attacks on medics and healthcare infrastructure in Lebanon, which it termed an apparent war crime. In August 2024, Amnesty International cited continued weapons transfers to Israel as a "stark example" of the failure of states to comply with the Arms Trade Treaty (ATT).

== See also ==
- Boycott, Divestment and Sanctions
- Boycotts of Israel
- Disinvestment from Israel
- List of sanctions involving Israel
