= Maurizio Bucci =

Italian diplomat

Italian Ambassador to Syria
- In office 14 May 1973 – 1976
- Preceded by: Uberto Bozzini
- Succeeded by: Giorgio Giacomelli

Permanent Representative of Italy to the United Nations in New York
- In office 1984–1988
- Preceded by: Umberto La Rocca
- Succeeded by: Giovanni Migliuolo

Chairman of UNICEF
- In office 1986–1987
- Preceded by: Anwarul Karim Chowdhury
- Succeeded by: A. P. Maruping

Personal details
- Born: 29 August 1923 (age 102) Sant'Angelo del Pesco, Isernia, Italy
- Profession: diplomat

Maurizio Bucci (born 29 August 1923) is an Italian diplomat, a former Permanent Representative to the United Nations in New York of Italy and a former chairman of UNICEF (1986–1987).

== Career ==
He joined the Ministry of Foreign Affairs in 1949, and has served as cabinet secretary to Carlo Sforza and Alcide De Gasperi. He was a member of the Italian delegation that negotiated the treaty for the establishment of the European Coal and Steel Community and the European Defence Community. He also participated in the negotiations on the Treaty of Rome.

He was ambassador in Damascus from 1973 to 1976 and in Brasília from 1976 to 1979. He then served as Director General for Economic Affairs at the Ministry of Foreign Affairs from 1979 to 1984 and Permanent Representative to the United Nations in New York from 1984. In that capacity, he was also Chairman of the UNICEF Executive Board from 1986 to 1987.

== Honors ==
- Italy: Knight Grand Cross of the Order of Merit of the Italian Republic (5 January 1982)
- Portugal: Grand Cross of the Order of Prince Henry (19 November 1980)

== See also ==
- Ministry of Foreign Affairs (Italy)
- Foreign relations of Italy
