= Hannu Halinen =

Finnish diplomat

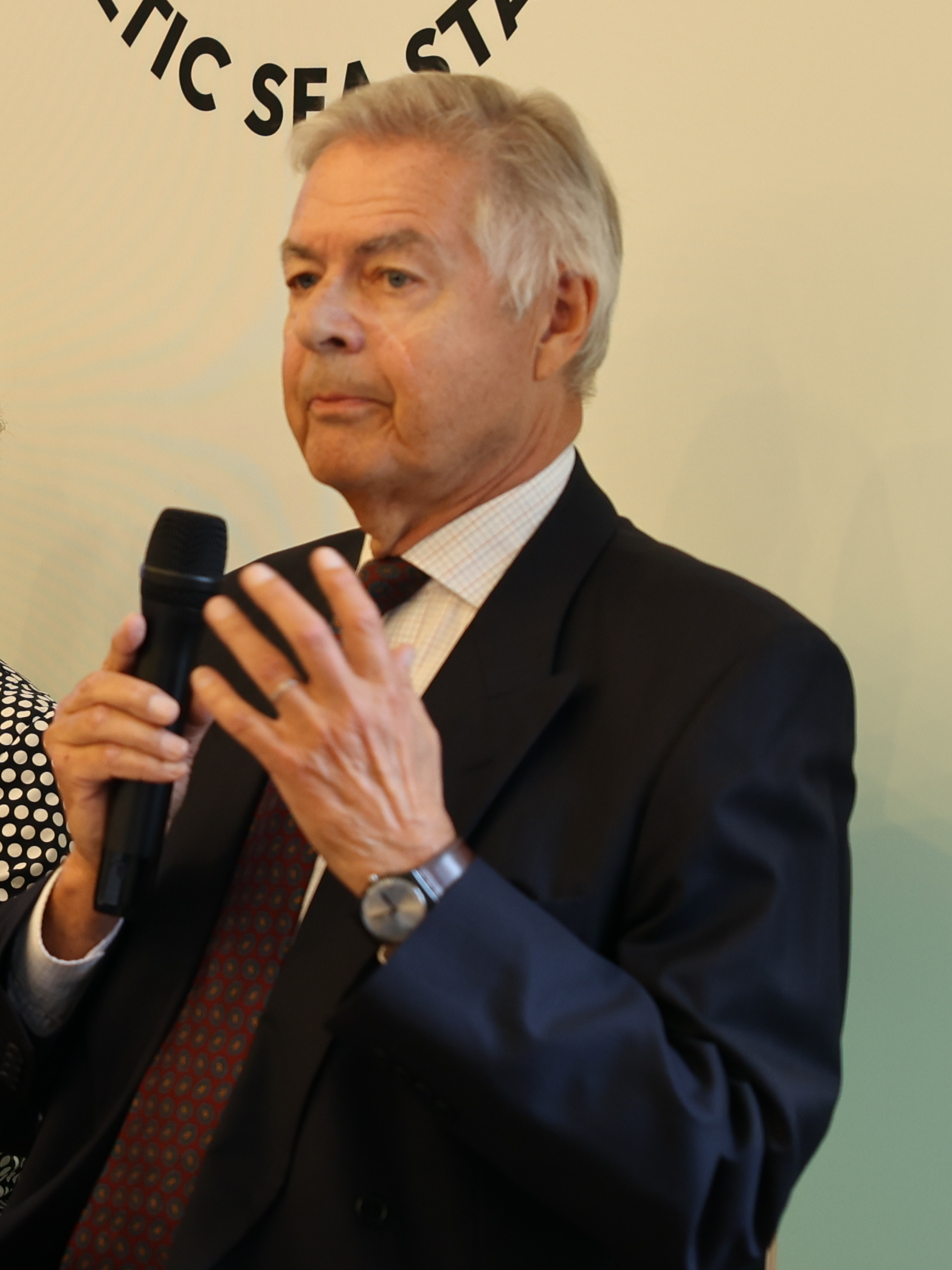
- Halinen in 2021

UN Special Rapporteur on the occupied Palestinian territories
- In office 1995–1999
- Preceded by: René Felber
- Succeeded by: Giorgio Giacomelli

Director General of the Council of the Baltic Sea States
- In office 2002–2005
- Preceded by: Jacek Starościak
- Succeeded by: Gabriele Kötschau

Personal details
- Born: 1947 or 1948
- Education: University of Helsinki (ML)

Hannu Halinen is a Finnish diplomat and former UN Special Rapporteur on the occupied Palestinian territories.

== Career ==
In December 1970, while serving as program secretary of the Jyväskylä Summer Festival, Halinen traveled to Moscow in an attempt to find Soviet performers. In 1973, he graduated from the University of Helsinki with a Master of Law degree and began working for the Ministry for Foreign Affairs. In 1989, he served as one of three vice-chairmen of the Food and Agriculture Organization of the United Nations.

In 1995, United Nations Commission on Human Rights Chairman Musa Hitam appointed Halinen to be the second Special Rapporteur on the occupied Palestinian territories. During his tenure, Halinen was criticized by the Palestinian Centre for Human Rights for writing a report that focused on human rights violations in the Palestinian Territories instead of focusing exclusively on human rights violations committed under the Israeli occupation, which they claimed was his sole obligation under the mandate of the Special Rapporteur. Halinen advocated for the mandate of the role to be expanded to include investigation of human rights violations committed by the Palestinian Authority.

From 1998 to 2002, Halinen served as the Finnish ambassador to Hungary in Budapest.

In 2002, he was appointed Director General of the Council of the Baltic Sea States for a three-year term.

From 2005 to 2009, Halinen served as the Finnish ambassador to Egypt and Sudan in Cairo.

In 2009, then-Foreign Minister Alexander Stubb appointed Halinen to be Finland's first Arctic Ambassador and appointed him to represent Finland in the Arctic Council. During his tenure, he lobbied for the creation of a permanent EU arctic information centre at the University of Lapland in Rovaniemi. In 2015, Halinen retired.

== Personal life ==
Halinen is from central Finland. He is married and has a daughter.
