= Institute for the Study of International Migration =

Private research institute in Washington, DC

- Founded: 1998
- Type: Research Institute
- Location: Washington, District of Columbia
- Website: isim.georgetown.edu

Institute for the Study of International Migration is a private research institute located in Washington, DC. Founded in 1998 as part of Georgetown University's School of Foreign Service, it is associated with the Georgetown University Law Center. The Institute for the Study of International Migration (ISIM) is an innovative multidisciplinary center that studies the social, economic, environmental, and political dimensions of international migration.

ISIM focuses on all aspects of international migration, including the causes and responses to population movements, immigration and refugee law and policy, comparative migration studies, immigrant integration in host societies, and the effects of international migration on social, economic, demographic, foreign policy, and national security concerns. ISIM also studies internal displacement, especially the forced displacement of people moving for reasons that would make them political or environmental refugees if they crossed an international border.

== Funding ==
The institute relies for funding on a multitude of government and independent grant-making agencies, including:

- United States Institute of Peace
- US Department of State
- US Department of Labor
- MacArthur Foundation
- German Marshall Fund of the United States
- World Bank Group
- Bill and Melinda Gates Foundation
- Rockefeller Foundation
- Sloan Foundation
- Carnegie Corporation of New York
- Polish National Science Centre (Harmonia)

== Academic work ==
ISIM conducts research and convenes symposia and conferences on U.S. immigration and refugee law and policies. It also undertakes comparative analysis of international migration issues affecting other countries, and of forced migration and responses to humanitarian emergencies.

ISIM is committed to building the next generation of international migration experts. It offers a certificate program for School of Foreign Service Masters students who have career interests in international migration and humanitarian issues. The certificate program prepares students to work in international migrant organizations, and in government and private agencies specializing in emergency relief, human rights and humanitarian activities. ISIM also provides work opportunities for students who work with faculty on various research projects.

ISIM forms partnerships with researchers at other U.S. and foreign universities to foster exchange of research and to undertake cooperative projects. It has an established Visiting Scholars program for academics and graduate students pursuing research on migration and refugee issues.

== Certificates offered ==
=== Graduate Certificate in Refugees and Humanitarian Emergencies ===
For more than 20 years, ISIM has offered a Certificate in Refugee and Humanitarian Emergencies for students who wish to pursue careers in the humanitarian sector, or who seek to understand refugees and the impacts of humanitarian crises on countries around the world. Students who completed the Certificate are currently working with the United Nations, non-governmental organizations, governmental aid agencies (such as USAID), and many other organizations. Other students have used this expertise and pursued careers in law, diplomacy, economic development, academia, and the private sector. The Certificate formally acknowledges that recipients have acquired a solid foundation in humanitarian principles, refugee and migration issues, international humanitarian and refugee law, the principles of disaster risk reduction and response, and current challenges facing humanitarian actors.

=== School of Continuing Studies Certificate in International Migration Studies ===
ISIM is the academic unit of record for the Certificate in International Migration Studies; the logistics are administered by the Georgetown University School of Continuing Studies. This interdisciplinary program is designed for policy and advocacy professionals with an interest in the social, cultural, economic, and legal ramifications of the movement of peoples between nations.

== See also ==
- KNOMAD
