= Giorgio Giacomelli =

Italian diplomat (1930–2017)

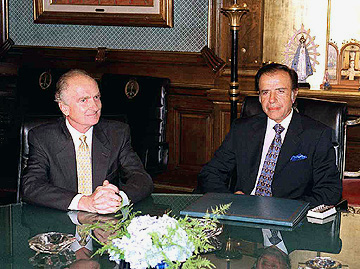
- Giacomelli (left) with Argentine president Carlos Menem at the Casa Rosada, December 1996

Italian ambassador to Somalia
- In office 12 June 1973 – 1976
- Preceded by: Giulio Terruzzi
- Succeeded by: Marcello Salimei

Italian ambassador to Syria
- In office 25 September 1976 – 1980
- Preceded by: Maurizio Bucci
- Succeeded by: Aldo Pugliese

Director General of UNRWA
- In office 1985–1991
- Preceded by: Olof Rydbeck
- Succeeded by: İlter Türkmen

Executive Director of UNODC
- In office 1991–1997
- Preceded by: Margaret Anstee
- Succeeded by: Pino Arlacchi

UN Special Rapporteur on the occupied Palestinian territories
- In office 1999–2001
- Preceded by: Hannu Halinen
- Succeeded by: John Dugard

Personal details
- Born: 30 January 1930 Milan, Kingdom of Italy
- Died: 8 February 2017 (aged 87) Rome, Italy
- Spouse: Elisabetta Belloni
- Education: University of Padua; University of Cambridge; Geneva Graduate Institute

Giorgio Giacomelli (Italian pronunciation: [ˈdʒordʒo dʒakoˈmɛlli]; 25 January 1930 – 8 February 2017) was an Italian diplomat who represented Italy as ambassador to Somalia and Syria. He was UNRWA's Commissioner-General from 1985 to 1991 and UN Special Rapporteur on the occupied Palestinian territories from 1999 to 2001.

== Biography ==
A native of Milan, Giacomelli studied at the University of Padua, the University of Cambridge and the Geneva Graduate Institute.

He was the Italian ambassador to Somalia from 1973 to 1976 and ambassador to Syria from 1976 to 1980. In 1981 he became Director-General for Emigration and Social Affairs in the Ministry of Foreign Affairs, and then, until October 1985, Director–General of the Department of Cooperation and Development. From 1985 to 1991 he was Commissioner-General of UNWRA. Giacomelli left UNRWA when he was appointed by UN Secretary-General Javier Pérez de Cuéllar to become head of the UN's anti-drug campaign and, contextually, the director of the United Nations Office at Vienna.

== Honors ==
Order of Merit of the Italian Republic 1st Class / Knight Grand Cross – 27 December 1993

Légion d'honneur – 1991

== See also ==
- List of Directors and Commissioners-General of the United Nations Relief and Works Agency for Palestine Refugees in the Near East
- Ministry of Foreign Affairs (Italy)
- Foreign relations of Italy
- Giorgio Giacomelli is New Executive Director of United Nations International Drug Control Programme
- Press Briefing by Executive Director of UNDCP - (27 October 1993)

Positions in intergovernmental organisations
Preceded by Olof Rydbeck ( (Sweden) )	Commissioner-General for United Nations Relief and Works Agency for Palestine Refugees in the Near East; October 1985–February 1991	Succeeded by İlter Türkmen ( (Turkey) )
Preceded by Hannu Halinen ( (Finland) )	United Nations Special Rapporteur on the occupied Palestinian territories 1999–2001	Succeeded by John Dugard ( (South Africa) )
