= Olof Rydbeck =

Swedish diplomat

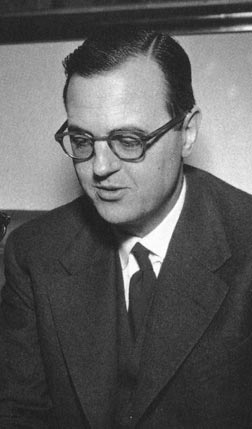
- Rydbeck in 1955
- Born: 13 April 1913; Djursholm, Sweden
- Died: 23 December 1995 (aged 82); Stocksund, Sweden
- Education: Djursholms samskola
- Alma mater: Uppsala University
- Occupation: Diplomat
- Years active: 1939–1985
- Height: 194 cm (6 ft 4 in)
- Spouse: Monica Schnell (m. 1940)
- Children: 2

Olof Rydbeck (15 April 1913 – 23 December 1995) was a Swedish diplomat. Rydbeck began his diplomatic career at the Swedish Ministry for Foreign Affairs in 1939, serving in Berlin, Ankara, and Washington, D.C., and holding roles such as acting second secretary and first secretary of legation. He later became head of division and chief of the Ministry's press bureau in 1952.

From 1955 to 1970, he served as Director-General of Sveriges Radio. He then represented Sweden at the United Nations as Permanent Representative (1970–1976) and on the Security Council (1975–1976), during which he was appointed by the UN Secretary-General to negotiate the future of Western Sahara. Rydbeck subsequently served as Swedish ambassador to London (1977–1979) and as Director-General of UNRWA in Vienna (1979–1985). In 1987, he chaired a national commission reviewing arms export practices.

In addition to his official roles, Rydbeck held numerous leadership positions in cultural, academic, and international organizations, including the Swedish Institute, the Swedish-American News Agency, the Swedish Red Cross, the European Broadcasting Union, the International Institute of Communications, Tidningarnas Telegrambyrå, and the Swedish Institute of International Affairs.

== Early life ==
Rydbeck was born on 15 April 1913 in Djursholm, Sweden, the son of bank manager Oscar Rydbeck and Signe Olson. He graduated from Djursholms samskola in 1931, earned a bachelor's degree in 1934 from Uppsala University, and completed a Candidate of Law degree in 1939. During his student years, he undertook study trips to England (1927 and 1930), Germany (1929 and 1940), France (1933), and Ankara (1941). He served as first curator of the Stockholms nation in Uppsala from 1937 to 1938 and was chairman of the conservative student association Heimdal in Uppsala from 1936 to 1937.

== Career ==
Rydbeck began his diplomatic career as an attaché at the Ministry for Foreign Affairs in 1939. The following year he served as a clerk to the Committee on Foreign Affairs, and in 1940 he was posted as attaché to the Swedish legation in Berlin. He was transferred to Ankara in 1941, returned to the Ministry in 1942, and became acting second secretary in 1943. That same year he also joined the American Affairs Inquiry (Amerikautredningen). In 1945 he served in Washington, D.C., where he became first secretary of legation in 1946. Subsequent postings included Bonn in 1950, and in 1952 he was appointed head of division and chief of the Ministry's press bureau.

From 1955 to 1970 Rydbeck was Director-General of Sveriges Radio. He then served as Sweden's Permanent Representative to the United Nations from 1970 to 1976, and as Sweden's representative on the United Nations Security Council from 1975 to 1976. During this period he was appointed by the UN Secretary-General to negotiate the future of Western Sahara. He was Swedish ambassador in London from 1977 to 1979 and Director-General of UNRWA in Vienna from 1979 to 1985. In 1987 he chaired the national citizens’ commission reviewing certain arms export practices.

Rydbeck also held a wide range of board and leadership positions in cultural, academic, and international organizations. He was a board member of the Swedish Institute and the Swedish-American News Agency from 1953 to 1955, the Swedish Tourist Traffic Association (Svenska turisttrafikförbundet) (1953–1955), and the Stockholm Concert Association (Stockholms konsertförening) (1955–1962). He served on the national board of the Swedish Red Cross (1955–1970), the council of the Swedish Institute from 1956, and the National Swedish Psychological Defence Planning Committee (Beredskapsnämnden för psykologiskt försvar) (1954–1970), where he was vice chairman from 1962 to 1970. He chaired the FHS Association (1957–1970), was president of the European Broadcasting Union (1961–1964, later honorary chairman), and chairman of the International Institute of Communications (1967–1970). He also served on the boards of the Tidningarnas Telegrambyrå (TT) and the Swedish Institute of International Affairs from 1967. In addition, he was a member of the Sällskapet Idun.

== Personal life ==
In 1940, Rydbeck married Monica Schnell (1918–2004), the daughter of ryttmästare Carl Gustaf Schnell and Hilda (née Hök). They had two children: Thomas (born 1943) and Cecilia (born 1947).

In 1990, Olof Rydbeck published his memoirs, I maktens närhet. Diplomat, radiochef, FN-ämbetsman (In the vicinity of power. Diplomat, radio chief, UN officer).

Rydbeck is said to have been the model for one of the cats, Bill and Bull, in Gösta Knutsson's Pelle Svanslös stories.

He later lived in Charbonnières-les-Bains, France.

== Deaths ==
Rydbeck died on 23 December 1995, in Stocksund, Sweden. The funeral was held on 12 January 1996 in St. Eugenia's Church in Stockholm. He was interred on 15 April 1996 at the Rydbeck family grave at Djursholm Cemetery in his hometown of Djursholm.

== Awards and decorations ==
- (Sweden) Seraphim Medal (1987)
- (Sweden) H. M. The King's Medal, 12th size gold (silver-gilt) medal worn around the neck on the Order of the Seraphim ribbon (1980)
- (Sweden) For Zealous and Devoted Service of the Realm (22 August 1979)
- (Sweden) Commander of the Order of the Polar Star (21 November 1963)
- (Sweden) Knight of the Order of the Polar Star (1958)
- (Denmark) Commander of the Order of the Dannebrog
- (Ethiopian Empire) Commander of the Order of Menelik II
- (West Germany) Commander of the Order of Merit of the Federal Republic of Germany
- (Hungary) Officer of the Hungarian Order of Merit

== Honours ==
- Member of the Royal Swedish Academy of Music (1962)

== Bibliography ==
- Rydbeck, Olof (1990). I maktens närhet: diplomat, radiochef, FN-ämbetsman (in Swedish). Stockholm: Bonnier. ISBN 9100479519. SELIBR 7147974.

== See also ==
- List of Directors and Commissioners-General of the United Nations Relief and Works Agency for Palestine Refugees in the Near East

Diplomatic posts
Preceded by Sverker Åström	Permanent Representative of Sweden to the United Nations; 1970–1977	Succeeded by Anders Thunborg
Preceded by Ole Jödahl	Ambassador of Sweden to the United Kingdom; 1977–1979	Succeeded by Per Lind
Positions in intergovernmental organisations
Preceded by Thomas McElhiney ( (United States) )	Commissioner-General for United Nations Relief and Works Agency for Palestine Refugees in the Near East; June 1979–October 1985	Succeeded by Giorgio Giacomelli ( (Italy) )
