= Arabang P. Maruping =

Lesotho civil servant and diplomat

Arabang P. (A.P.) Maruping (born 1944) is a Lesotho civil servant and diplomat. She served as Chairman of UNICEF at the international level from 1987 to 1988. She resigned in April 1988 and was replaced by Makoto Taniguchi for the remainder of the term. She was also a member of the UNICEF/WHO Joint Committee on Health Policy. In Lesotho she was Director of Health Services. She was also Regional Advisor for Child and Adolescent Health at the WHO Regional Office for Africa.
