= UN Special Rapporteur on the occupied Palestinian territories =

United Nations Special Rapporteur

United Nations Special Rapporteur on the occupied Palestinian territories
- Emblem of the United Nations

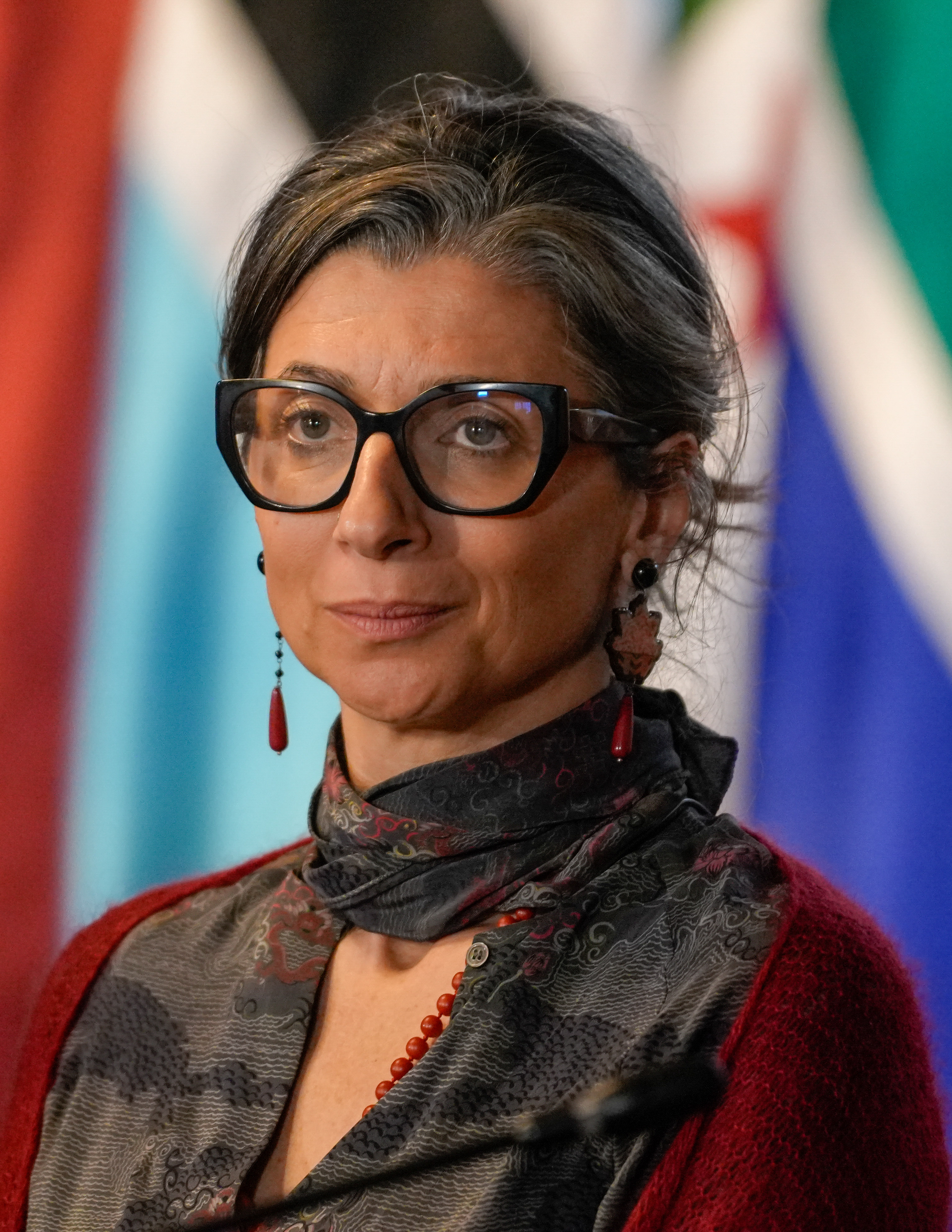
- Incumbent; Francesca Albanese since 1 May 2022
- Inaugural holder: René Felber
- Website: www.ohchr.org/en/special-procedures/sr-palestine

The Special Rapporteur on the occupied Palestinian territories, formally the Special Rapporteur on the situation of human rights in the Palestinian territories occupied since 1967, is a special rapporteur who works for the United Nations and reports on the human rights situation in Palestine ("the occupied Palestinian territories"). Established by mandate in 1993, the special rapporteur submits two reports annually.

Francesca Albanese was appointed in 2022 as the first woman to become Special Rapporteur on the occupied Palestinian territories.

== Background ==
Following the 1967 Six-Day War, Israel occupied a number of territories including Palestinian Mandate territories of the West Bank, the Gaza Strip, the Sinai Peninsula, and the Golan Heights. Shortly after, United Nations Security Council Resolution 242 (S/RES/242) was adopted unanimously by the UN Security Council on 22 November 1967.

In 1993, in the Oslo Accords, interim agreements were made between Israel and the Palestine Liberation Organization.

In 2022, the UN Human Rights Council reaffirmed their previous stance that Israeli settlements in the occupied Palestinian Territory were illegal under international law and appointed Francesca Albanese to the position.

== Mandate ==
The mandate was established in 1993 by the former Commission on Human Rights in CHR resolution 1993/2. The special rapporteur is an independent expert appointed by the United Nations to follow and report on human rights in the occupied Palestinian territory.

The special rapporteur typically submits two reports annually, one to the Human Rights Council in Geneva and another to the General Assembly in New York City.

== List of post-holders ==
United Nations Special Rapporteur on the occupied Palestinian territories
Name	Picture	Time frame	Country
René Felber		1993–1995	Switzerland
Hannu Halinen		1995–1999	Finland
Giorgio Giacomelli		1999–2001	Italy
John Dugard		2001–2008	South Africa
Richard Falk		2008–2014	USA
Makarim Wibisono		2014–2016	Indonesia
Michael Lynk		2016–2022	Canada
Francesca Albanese		2022–Present	Italy
